= Uwharrie =

Uwharrie may refer to several geographical features in North Carolina in the United States:

- Uwharrie Mountains
- Uwharrie National Forest
- Uwharrie River
- Uwharrie Lakes Region
