= Yadkin–Pee Dee River Basin =

Drainage basin of the Pee Dee River

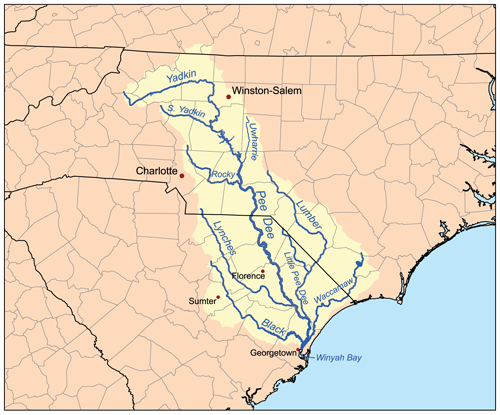
Yadkin–Pee Dee River Basin

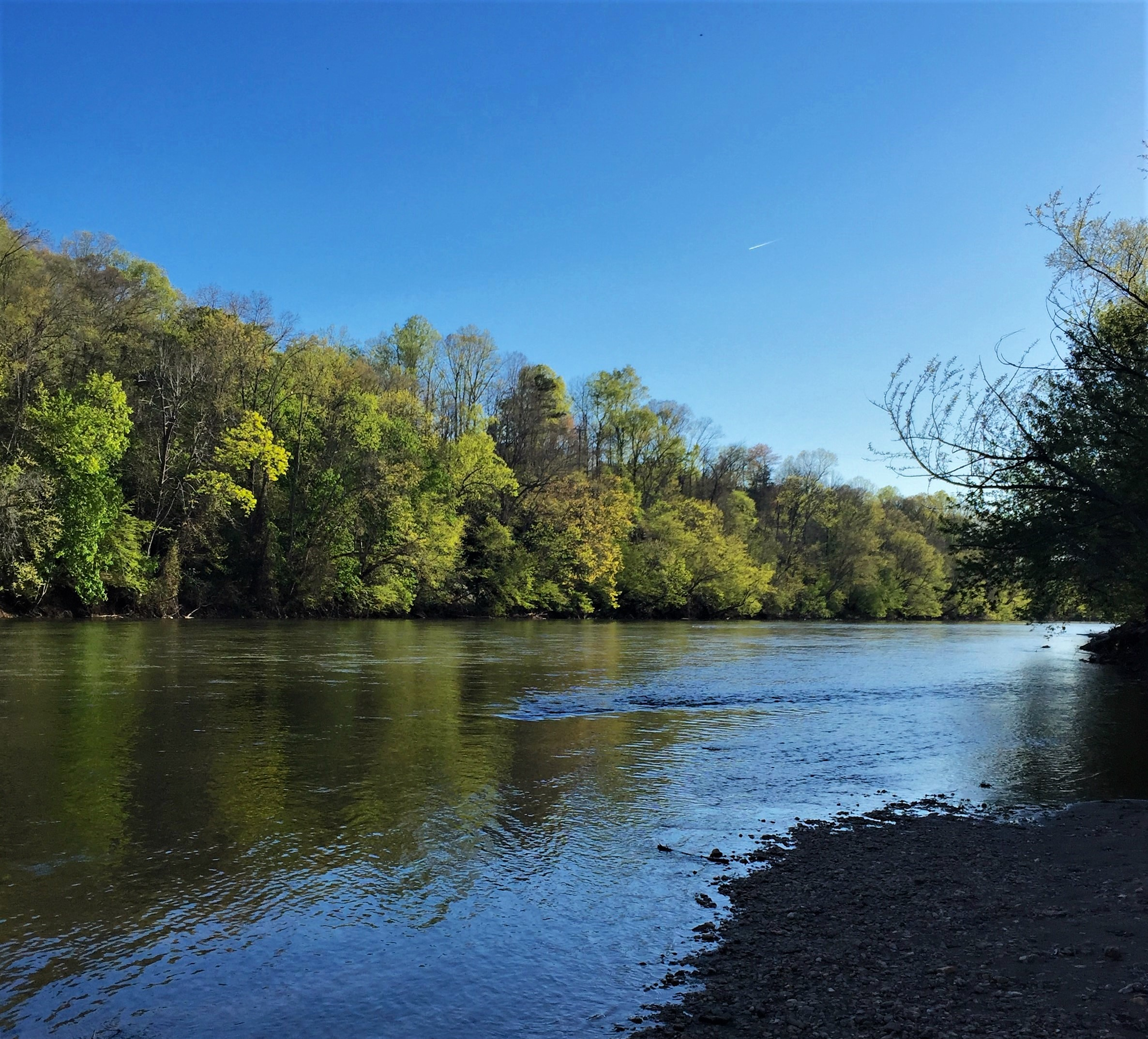
The Yadkin River near Tobaccoville, NC

The Yadkin–Pee Dee River Basin (alternatively watershed or drainage basin) is a large river basin in the eastern United States, covering around 7,221 square miles, making it the second largest in the state of North Carolina. Its headwaters rise near Blowing Rock, North Carolina, and the basin drains to the Atlantic Ocean in Winyah Bay, east of Georgetown, South Carolina.

The majority of the basin is within the Piedmont geographical area of the United States, and South Carolina, and parts of the Appalachian Mountains, in North Carolina. It is part of the larger South Atlantic–Gulf Water Resource Region.

== Geography ==
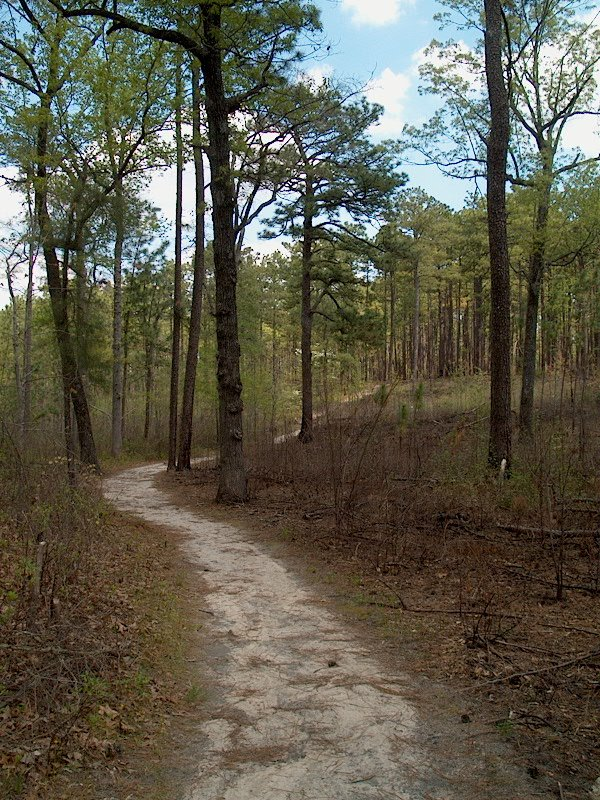
Sandhills of North Carolina

The watershed starts in the northwestern corner of North Carolina near Blowing Rock (protruding only slightly into Carroll and Patrick counties of Virginia) and extends south by southeast, crossing the south central border into South Carolina, with slightly more than half of the watershed in North Carolina. It is the second largest in the state.

The basin covers an area approximately 433 miles long and includes 5,862 miles of streams and rivers, 22,988 acres of lakes and has an area of about 7,221 square miles. Over 22,988 acres of the basin is covered by lakes. The basin is home to 93 separate municipalities, in 21 counties with an estimated population of 1,463,535 (2000 U.S. Census).

The basin covers a number of geographical areas, starting at the Appalachian Mountains and the North Carolina Foothills continuing through the central Piedmont area, into the Sandhills region and Coastal Plains before finally exiting into the Atlantic Ocean at Winyah Bay.

== Features ==
The watershed is home to a number of unique geological features, such as Pilot Mountain, a 2,421 ft metamorphic quartzite monadnock, which was the original inspiration for "Mount Pilot" in the 1960s television show The Andy Griffith Show. This is near Mount Airy, North Carolina, the basis for the city of Mayberry.

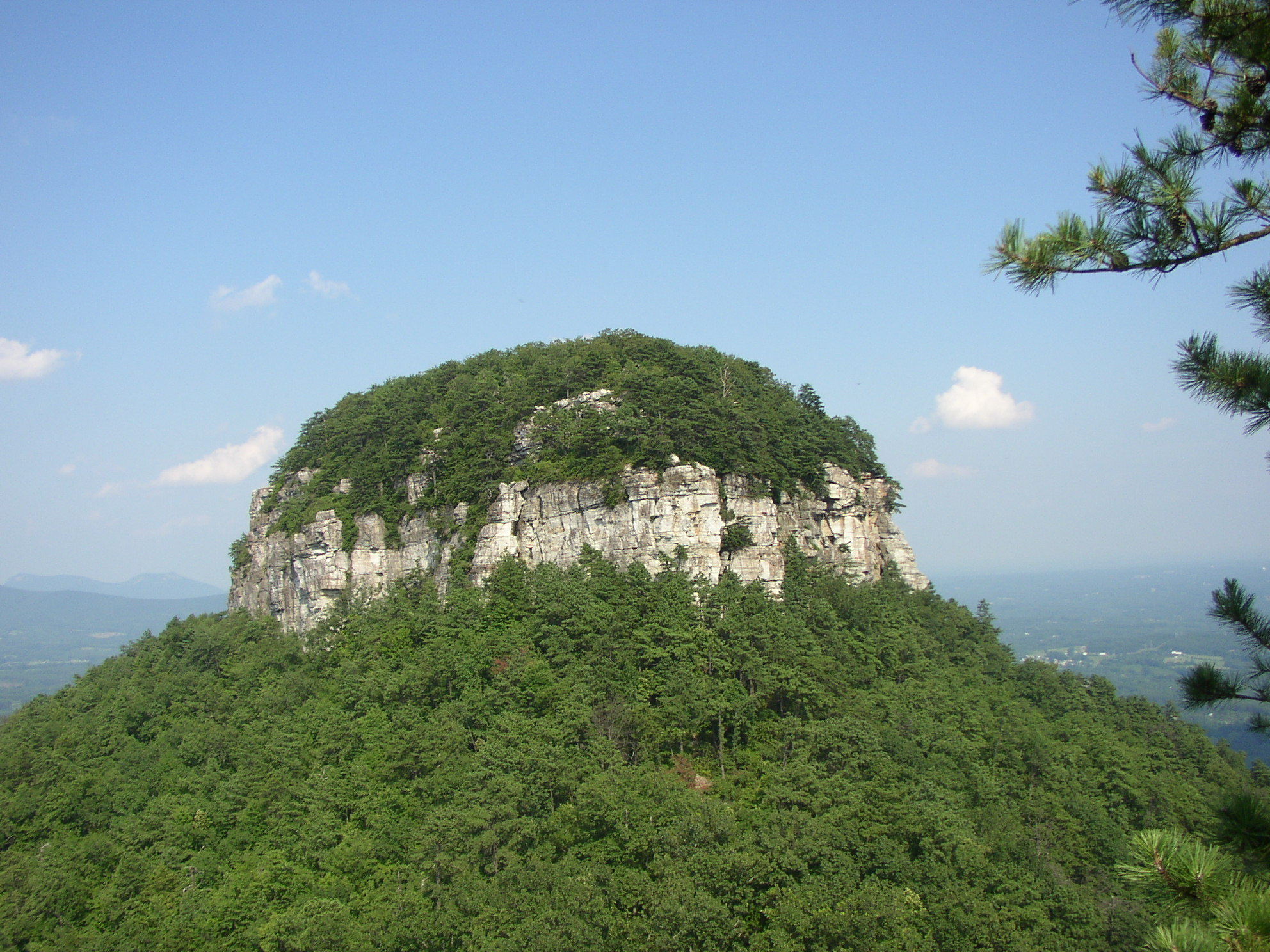
Pilot Mountain

Additionally, the region is home to a number of national and state parks and other natural wonders including Blowing Rock, parts of the Blue Ridge Parkway, Tanglewood Park, the 45,000 acre Carolina Sandhills National Wildlife Refuge and the 50,000 acre Uwharrie National Forest. The Pee Dee National Wildlife Refuge, an 8,443-acre wildlife preserve for waterfowl, lies completely within the confines of the watershed. Over half of the total land area is forested, including the Uwharrie National Forest. There are 38 aquatic rare species within the basin, including the Shortnose sturgeon and Carolina heelsplitter, which are listed as federally endangered. Bald eagles can be found in the locality of Badin Lake. The bald eagle sightings were so common in the area that Alcoa's subsidiary, Yadkin, Inc., developed a Bald Eagle Management Plan. The eagles migrate through, but do not generally nest in the area.

In North Carolina, 42 percent of the state's dairy cattle are raised in the basin (half of that number in the South Yadkin Subbasin alone). Also 36 percent of the poultry population (approximately 66 million birds) in the state. Hog farming has been a contentious issue in many parts of North Carolina, but the river basin only supports 2 percent of North Carolina's swine population. Crop lands decreased by 46 percent between 1982 and 1992, while urban development increased by 38 percent.

== Hydrology ==
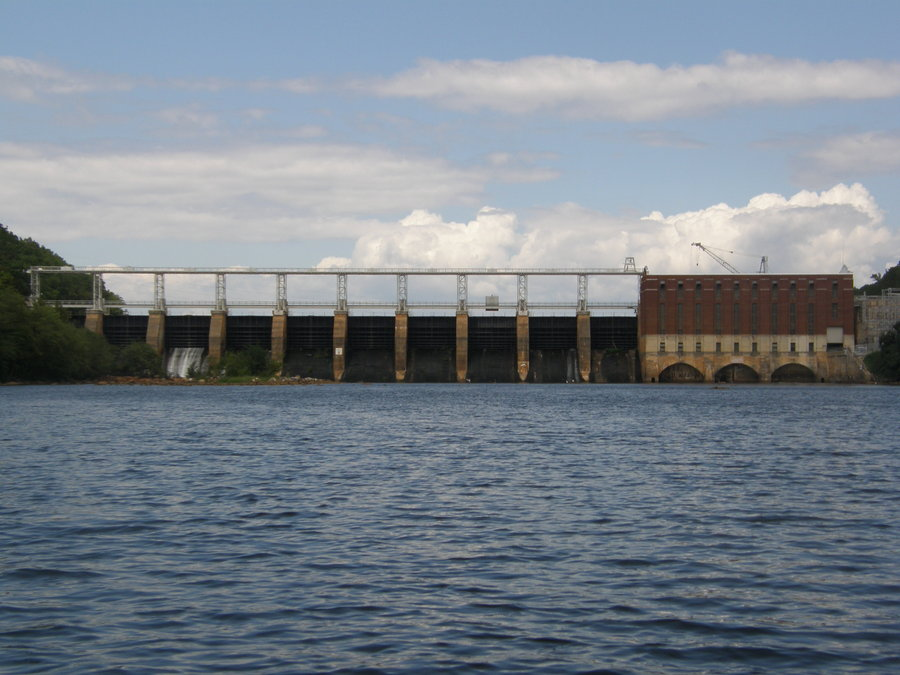
High Rock Dam, built in 1927.

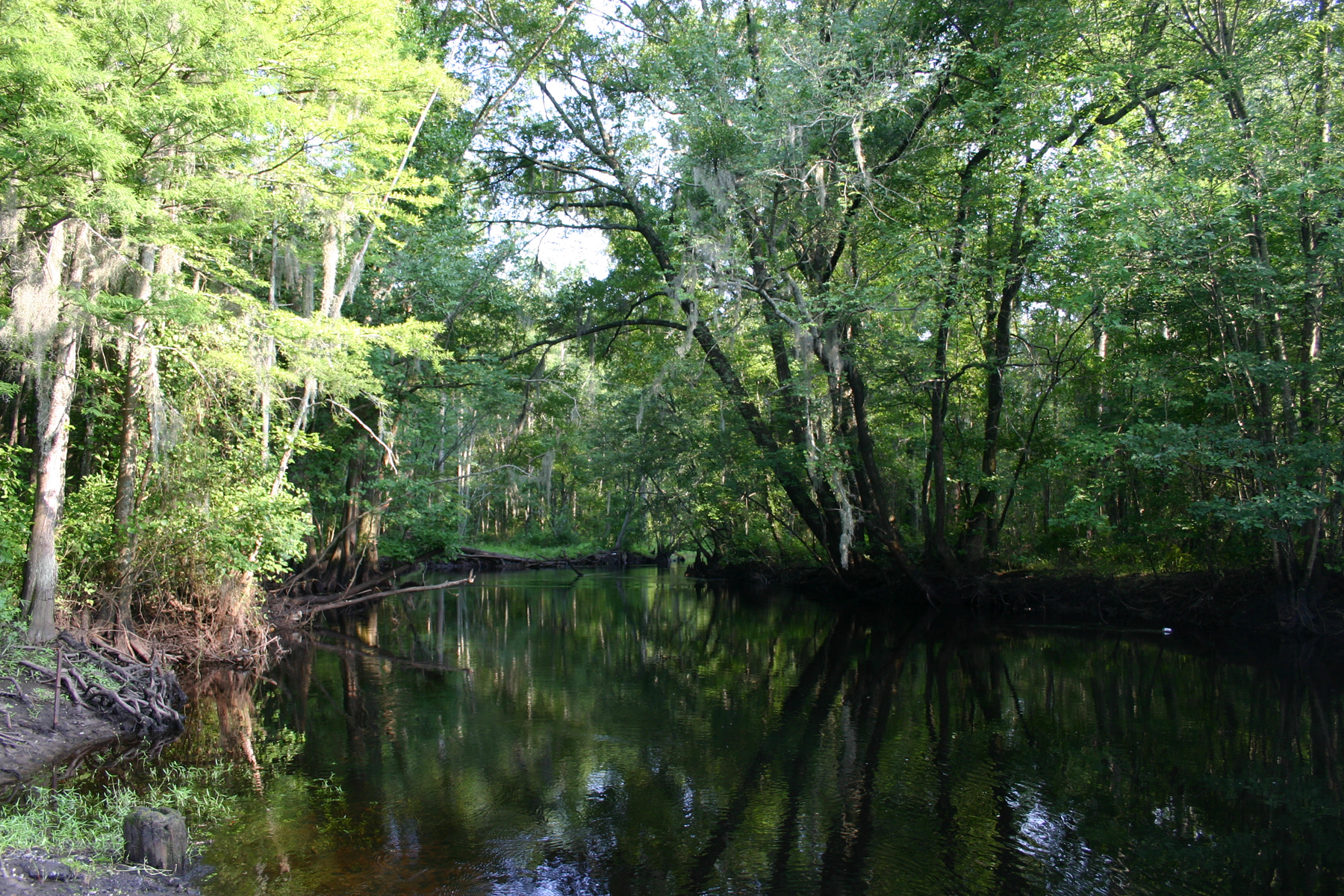
Little Pee Dee River

There are 22,988 acres of lakes and 5,863 miles of watercourses in the basin. Five major lakes exist within the watershed, all in North Carolina, including:

- W. Kerr Scott Reservoir
- High Rock Lake
- Tuckertown Reservoir
- Badin Lake
- Falls Reservoir

All the major lakes except the W. Kerr Scott Reservoir generate hydroelectric power for the "Yadkin Project" which is under the control of the aluminium producing company Alcoa, and licensed to operate by the Federal Energy Regulatory Commission (FERC). The combined Yadkin Project has a total generating capacity of almost 215 megawatts of electricity. The Narrows Dam and powerhouse development at Badin Lake is the only hydroelectric project in North Carolina that is listed on the National Register of Historic Places.

A number of large rivers flow within the Yadkin–Pee Dee watershed, totaling 5,946 linear river miles. In South Carolina, these include the Lynches River, Great Pee Dee River, Little Pee Dee River, Black River and Waccamaw River, while in North Carolina, the major rivers include the Yadkin River, South Yadkin River, Abbotts Creek, Roaring River, Uwharrie River and Rocky River.

=== Water quality ===
There are a number of water quality issues within the basins. In an average water basin, between 5 and 58 tons per square mile per year (t/mi^{2}/yr) of fine-grained sediment are removed from the surrounding land in surface runoff but the Yadkin–Pee Dee River Basin sees 300 t/mi^{2}/yr in runoff due to rapid population growth and agricultural practices that leave bare soil exposed to erosion.

As of 2010, thirty-nine percent of rivers within the North Carolina section of the basin fail to meet the state water quality standards and are listed as "impaired".

== See also ==
- List of North Carolina rivers
- List of South Carolina rivers
