= Uwharrie Lakes Region =

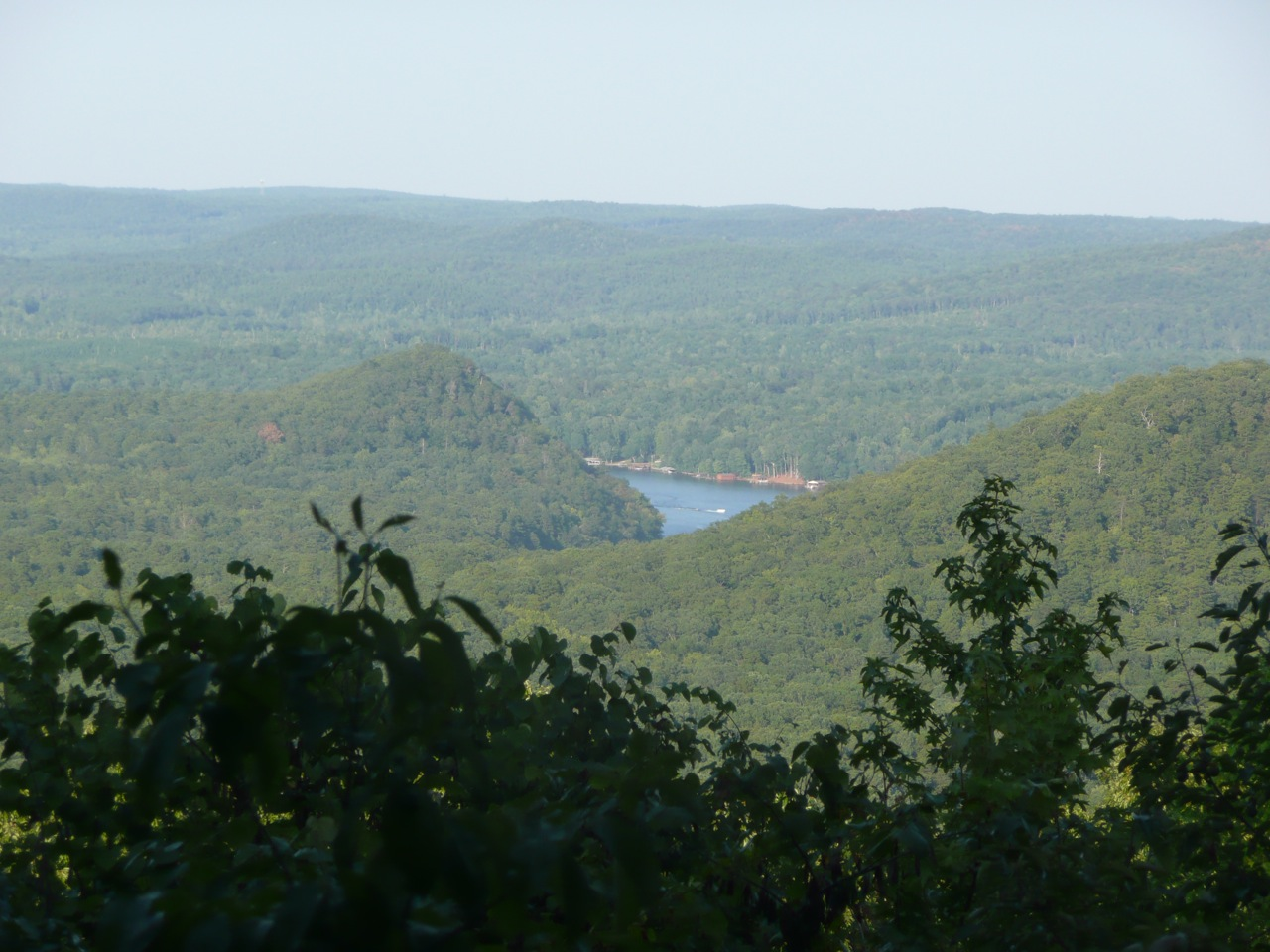

The Uwharrie Lakes Region of North Carolina in the United States refers to the lakes created by the damming of the Yadkin and Pee Dee rivers along the western slopes of the ancient Uwharrie Mountains.

The region consists of High Rock Lake in the north, followed by Tuckertown Reservoir, Badin Lake, Falls Reservoir, Lake Tillery and finally Blewett Falls Lake in the south.

The region is bordered by the Uwharrie National Forest in the east and lies within Stanly, Rowan, Davidson, Montgomery, Anson, and Richmond counties.
