= Abbotts Creek (North Carolina) =

Stream in North Carolina, USA

Abbotts Creek Tributary to Yadkin River
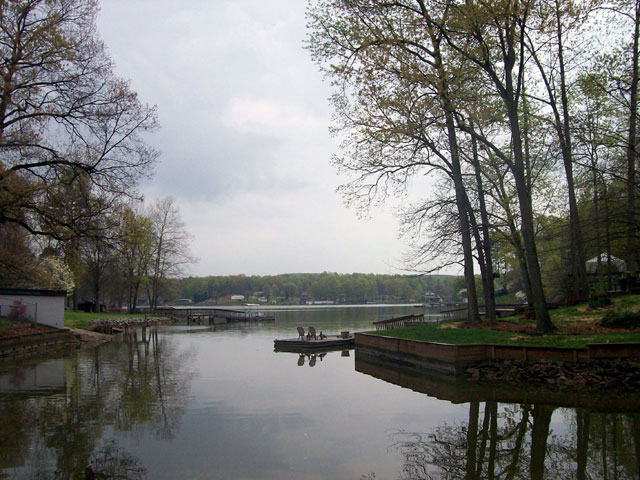
- Abbotts Creek section of High Rock Lake North Carolina

- Location of Abbotts Creek mouth

Location
- Country: United States
- State: North Carolina
- Counties: Davidson; Forsyth

Physical characteristics
- Source: divide between Abbotts Creek and Belews Creek (Dan River tributary)
  - location: Kernersville, North Carolina
  - coordinates: 36°07′06″N 080°04′15″W
  - elevation: 1,000 ft (300 m)
- Mouth: Yadkin River (High Rock Lake)
  - location: High Rock Lake
  - coordinates: 35°37′43″N 080°15′48″W
  - elevation: 624 ft (190 m)
- Length: 45.45 mi (73.14 km)
- Basin size: 223.6 square miles (579 km^{2})
- Discharge
  - location: High Rock Lake (Yadkin River)
  - average: 220.54 cu ft/s (6.245 m^{3}/s) at mouth with High Rock Lake

Basin features
- Progression: generally south
- River system: Yadkin River
- Tributaries
  - left: Cuddybum Branch; Rich Fork; Pounder Fork; Buddle Branch
  - right: Spurgeon Creek; Reedy Run; Brushy Fork; Leonard Creek
- Waterbodies: Lake Thom-A-Lex; High Rock Lake

Abbotts Creek starts in Kernersville, NC in Forsyth County and flows into High Rock Lake near Lexington, NC in Davidson County just north of Hwy 47. The section of High Rock Lake that is officially Abbotts Creeks ends near the Hwy 8 causeway, in Southmont, NC.

The median flow at Lexington ranges from 50 to 200 cubic feet per second. While it only provides a relatively small amount of water that enters the lake, it provides a significant fraction of the total surface area of the lake and hosts a large community of lake front homes, as well as provides significant habitat for fish and wildlife. The upper sections of the lake at Abbotts Creek do not have lake front properties and are considered prime area for sports fishing, particularly largemouth bass and catfish.

The lake, up to the high water mark is under the control of Alcoa and is managed under contract granted by the US government.

== Gallery ==
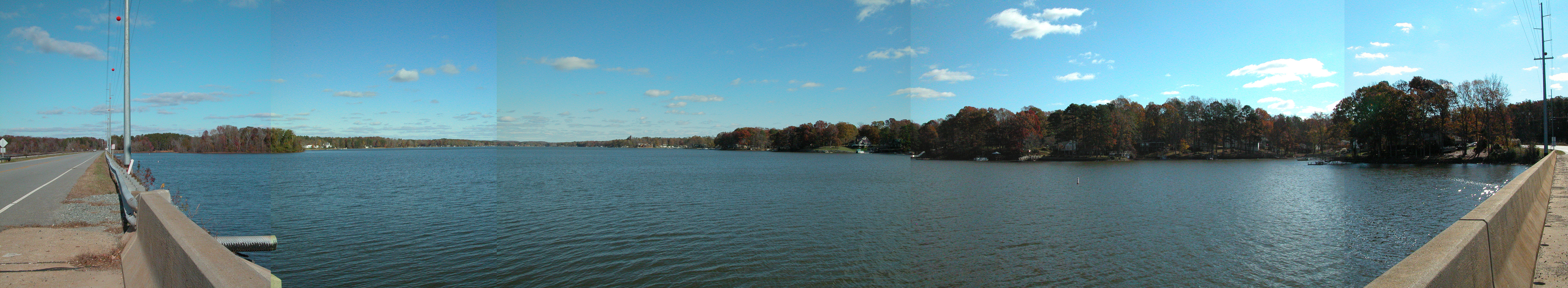
Large composite panoramic image of Abbotts Creek from Hwy 8

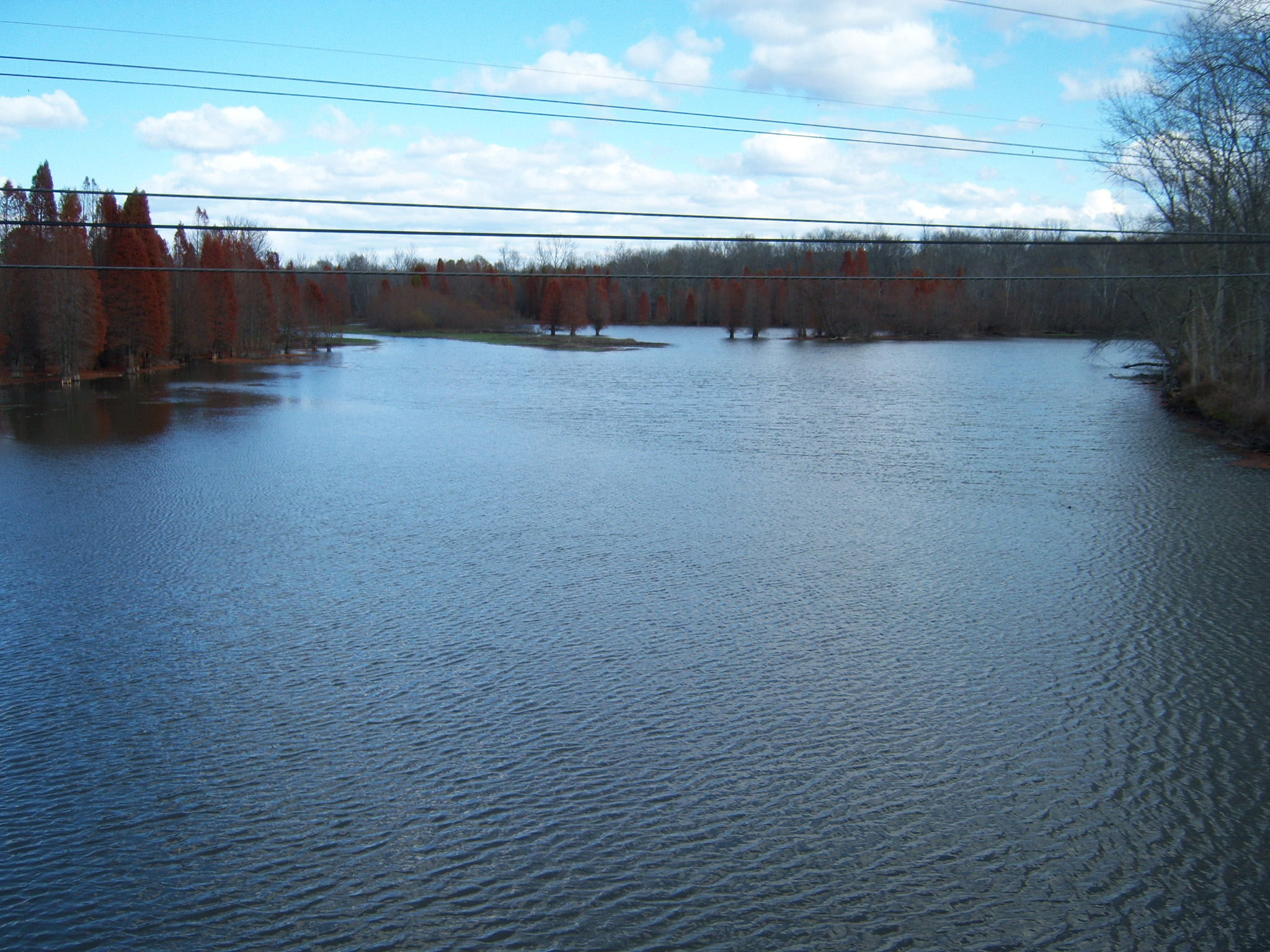
View of Abbotts Creek where it becomes High Rock Lake, from Hwy 47.

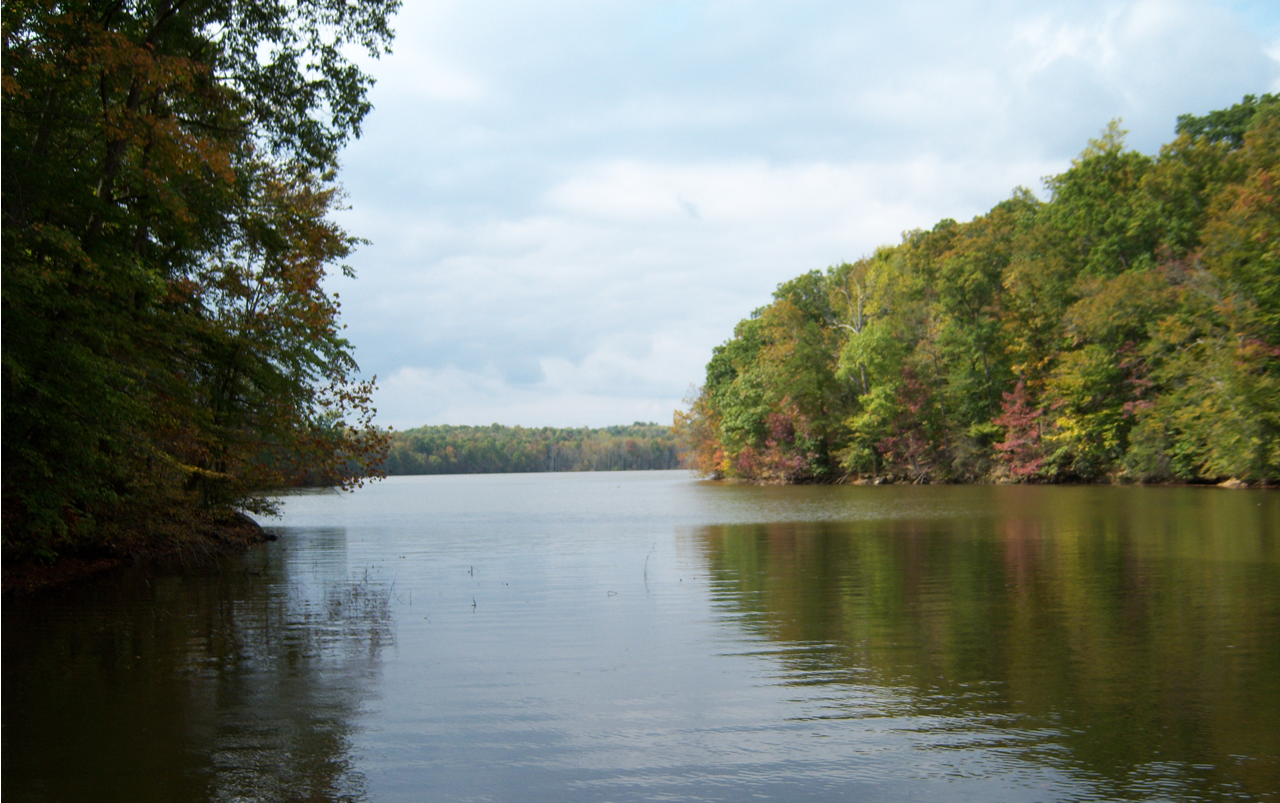
Cove along the north end of Abbotts Creek

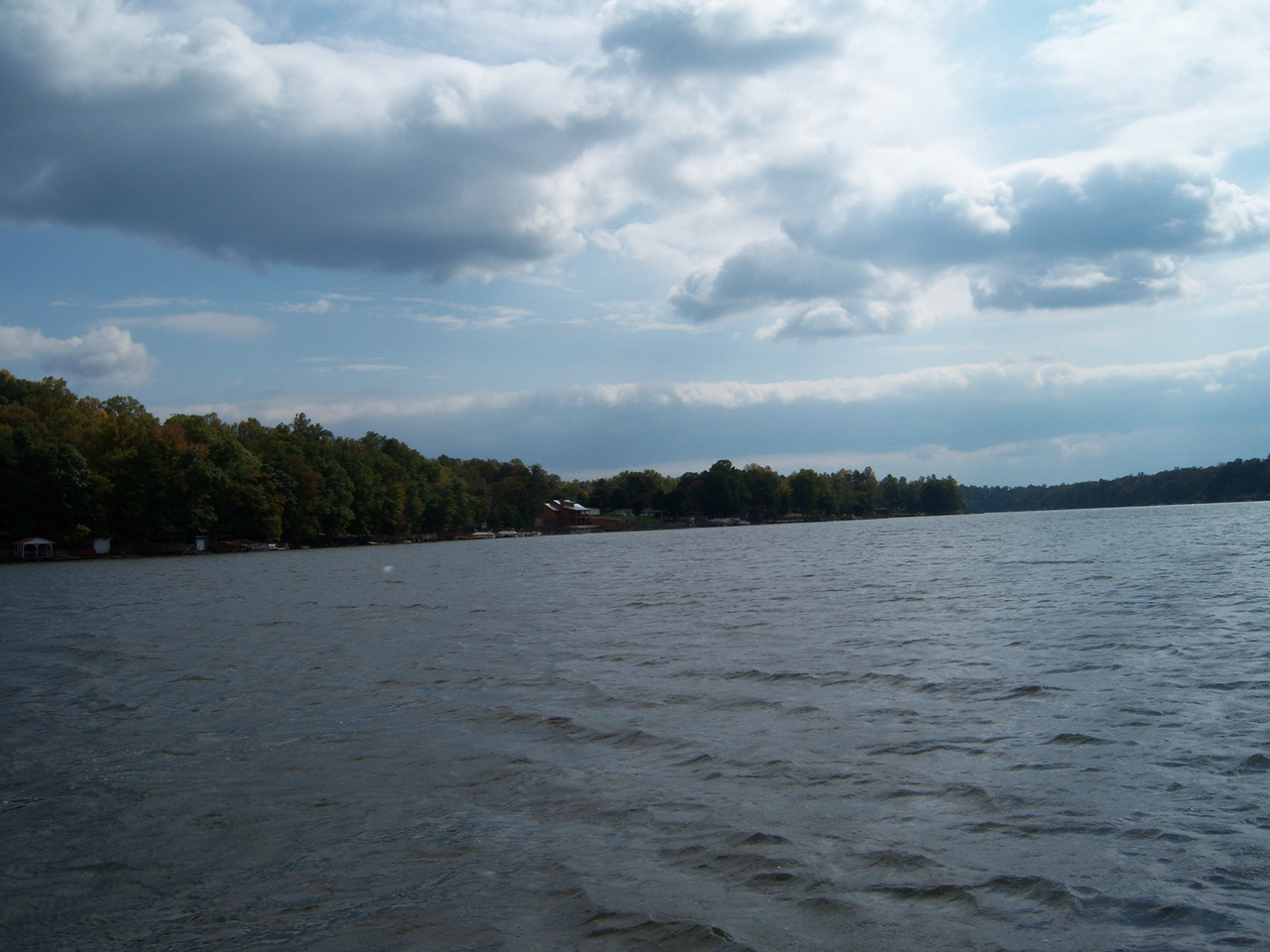
Main channel in northern end of Abbotts Creek

== See also ==
- Lexington, North Carolina
- Southmont, North Carolina
- High Rock Lake Association
- Yadkin River

== Maps ==
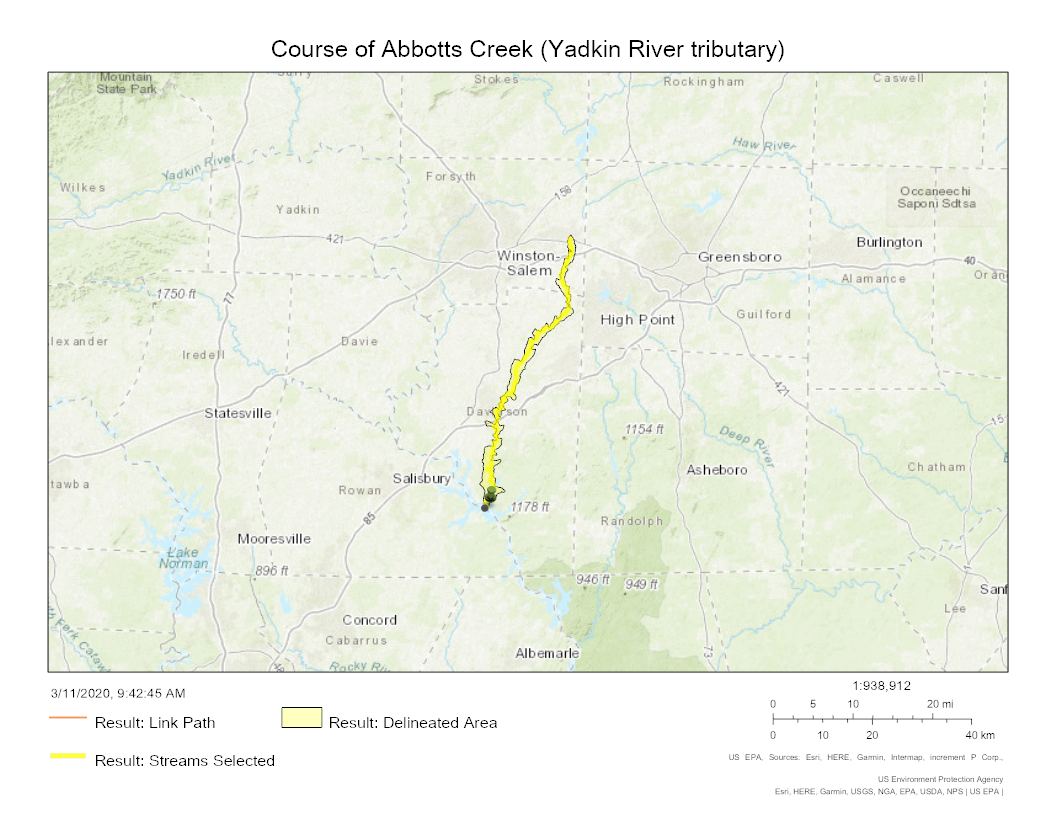
Course of Abbotts Creek (Yadkin River tributary)

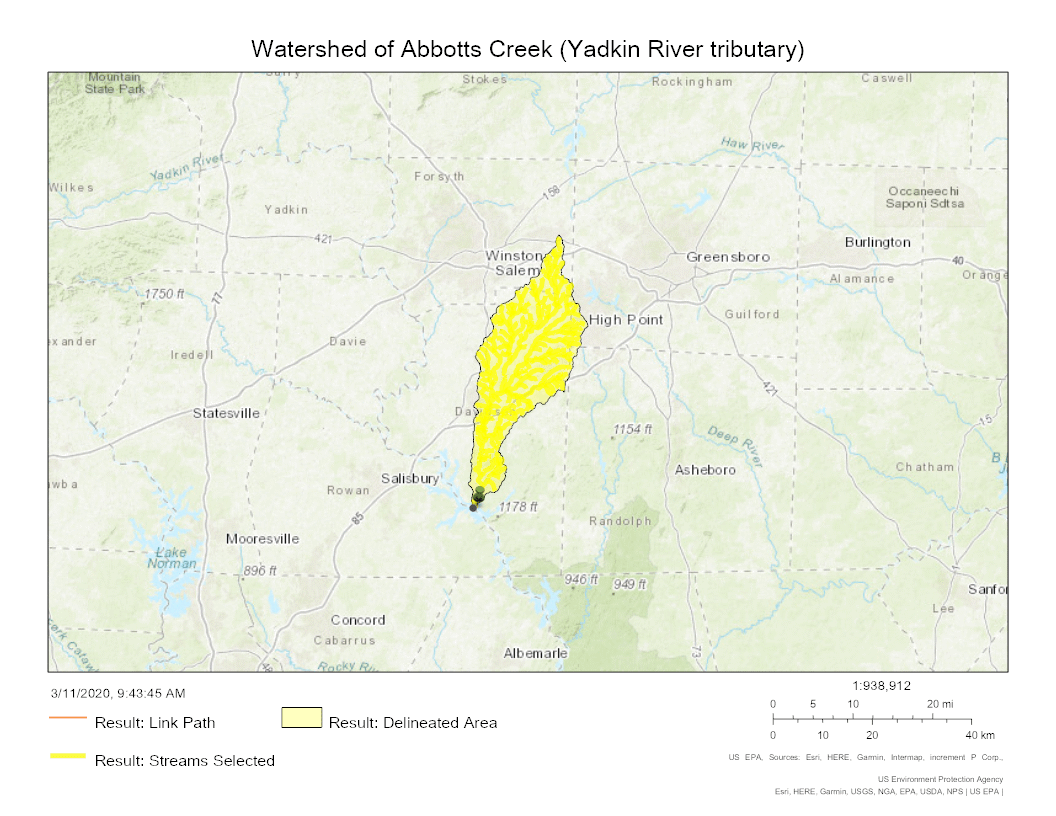
Watershed of Abbotts Creek (Yadkin River tributary)
