= Tuckertown Reservoir =

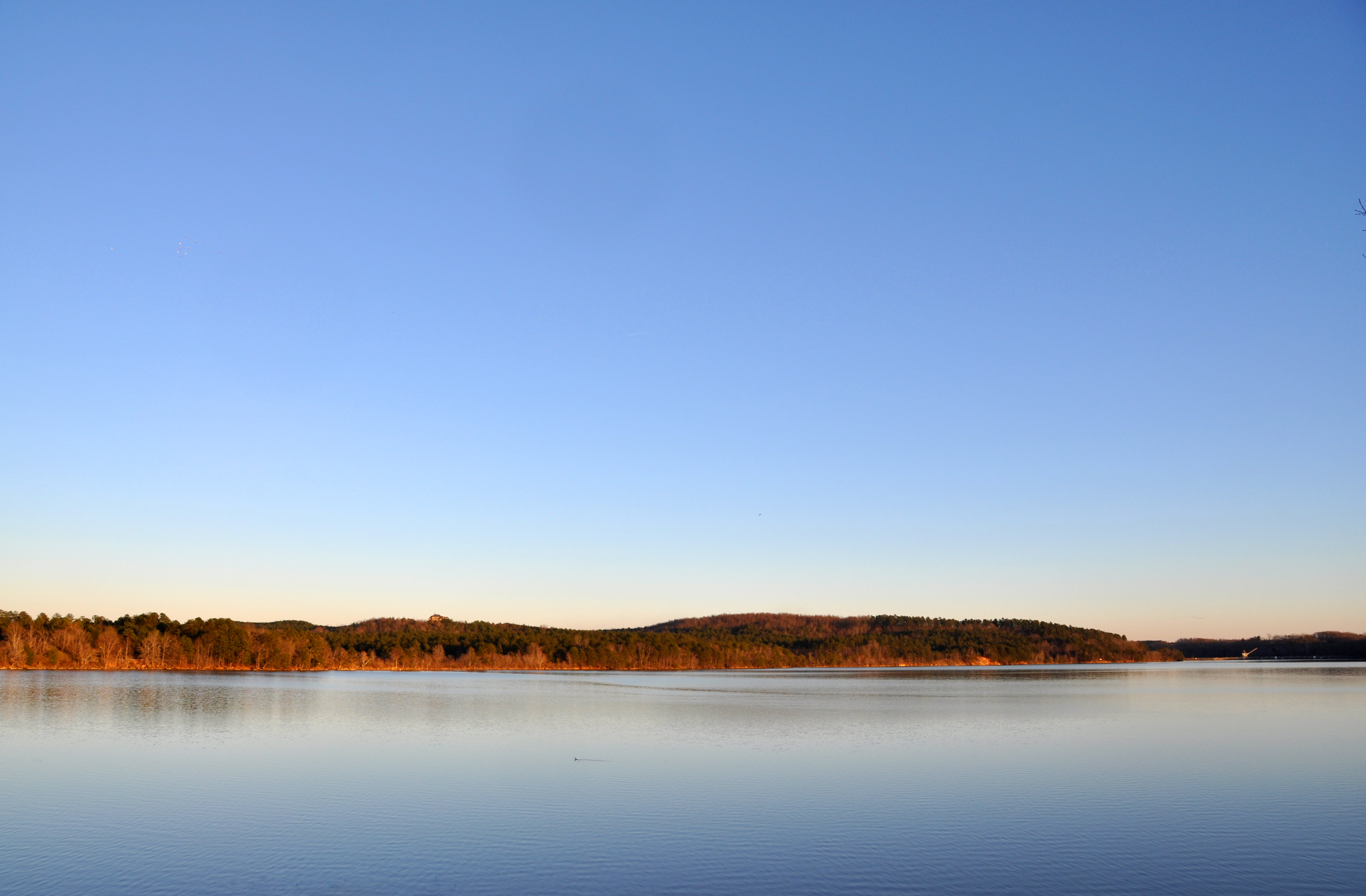

- Location within North Carolina Location within the United States
- Location: North Carolina
- Coordinates: 35.499°N 80.181°W
- Type: reservoir
- Primary inflows: Yadkin River
- Primary outflows: Yadkin River
- Basin countries: United States
- Surface elevation: 564.7 ft (172.1 m)

The Tuckertown Reservoir is the reservoir formed by the Tuckertown Dam 35°29′05″N 80°10′36″W at the North end of Badin Lake and the High Rock Dam 35°36′03″N 80°14′06″W at the bottom of High Rock Lake in the Uwharrie Lakes Region in the U.S. state of North Carolina.

The reservoir is located in Davidson County, Stanly County, Montgomery County, and Rowan County and contains the wide and navigable waterway of the Yadkin River. The dam itself, at the south end of the reservoir, spans the river between Harris Township in Stanly County and Eldorado Township in Montgomery County. Used for hydroelectric power generation, Tuckertown Lake was historically managed and operated by the Alcoa company, but in February 2017 Alcoa sold the power generation to Cube Hydro Carolinas LLC, an affiliate of Cube Hydro Partners, LLC.

The lake has multiple crossings. One is the Bringle Ferry Bridge that bridges the river between High Rock (in Davidson County) and Pooletown (in Rowan County), and from which there are views of the High Rock Dam. The second crossing is the NC Hwy 49 Bridge at Tuckertown. The next bridge north of the Bringle Ferry Bridge is located at the Interstate 85 crossing near Salisbury. There are more crossings in the backs of the lakes creeks.

The next bridge south of the NC Hwy 49 Bridge is at the James B. Garrison Bridge over Lake Tillery between Albemarle and Troy. The Tuckertown Reservoir occupies a narrow valley in the western edge of the ancient Uwharrie Mountains.

== See also ==
- Yadkin-Pee Dee River Basin
