= High Rock Lake =

Lake in North Carolina, United States

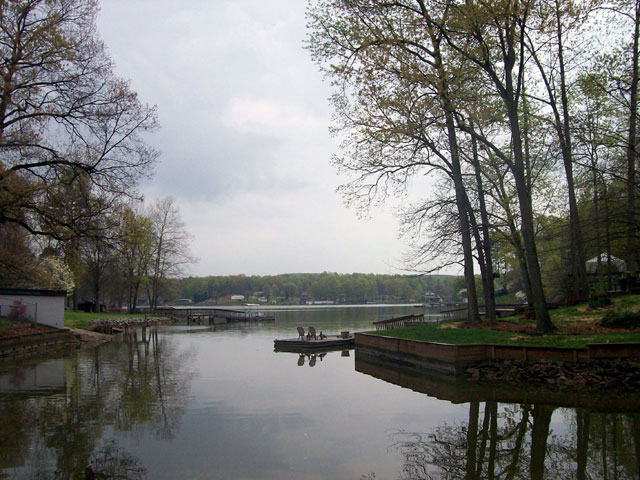
- Abbotts Creek section (Spring 2007)

- Location within North Carolina
- Location: Davidson / Rowan counties, North Carolina, United States
- Coordinates: 35°37′44″N 80°15′4″W
- Type: Reservoir
- Primary inflows: Yadkin River, Abbotts Creek South Yadkin River
- Primary outflows: Tuckertown Reservoir
- Basin countries: United States
- Max. length: 19 miles (31 km)
- Surface area: 15,180 acres (61.4 km^{2})
- Surface elevation: 655 ft (200 m) at full pool
- Settlements: Southmont, Lexington, Salisbury

High Rock Lake is a reservoir located on the Yadkin River in central North Carolina in the counties of Davidson and Rowan. Built in 1926-27 by the Tallassee Power Company, a wholly owned subsidiary of the Aluminum Company of America (Alcoa), the lake is the northernmost of a series of four hydroelectric projects designed at the time to support the company’s Badin Works, a large aluminum smelting operation located 16 miles (26 km) downstream in the community of Badin. After the permanent closing of the Badin Works in 2007, Alcoa continued to operate its Yadkin hydroelectric facilities until selling them to Cube Hydro Carolinas in 2016.

At the time of construction, High Rock was the largest reservoir in North Carolina and one of the largest in the United States. When full, its surface covers 15,180 acres (61 km^{2}) with 360 miles (579 km) of shoreline and is 59 feet (18 m) deep at the dam. Normal pool elevation is 624 feet (190 m) above sea level (655’ 1926 Alcoa datum). Upstream, the Yadkin River drains 4,341 square miles (10,290 km^{2}) of the land area of North Carolina’s northwest piedmont.

The dam was built in a small gorge formed where the river cuts through a major ridge of the Uwharrie Mountains. High Rock Mountain, the highest point in the Uwharries, towers over the adjoining dam site creating one of the most extensive views found in the North Carolina piedmont. Both the mountain and the lake are named for the “high rocks”, a large outcropping of rocks located on the ridge approximately half a mile east of the dam.

Being its furthest upstream resource, High Rock was managed by Alcoa during most of its years of ownership not only for its electricity production, but also to control water levels in all the Uwharrie Lakes downstream. This often resulted in extreme drawdown during summer months when normal river flow was low.

The impoundment extends some 19 miles (31 km) upstream from the dam to the mouth of South Yadkin River near Salisbury. Major arms of the lake are formed by numerous creeks including Flat Swamp, Abbotts, Buddle, Swearing, and North and South Potts in Davidson County; and Panther, Dutch Second, and Crane in Rowan County. The main trunk’s widest point exceeds one mile.

Since its construction, surrounding communities including Lexington, Salisbury, Southmont, Spencer, and Denton, have enjoyed tremendous economic benefit through recreation driven by the lake. High Rock has proven to be one of the outstanding sites in the southeast for inland sailing, power boating, and fishing. In recent years, paddling has been added to the list with the designation of the Yadkin River State Canoe Trail which traverses the length of the lake, along with the trail's Daniel Boone Heritage section which terminates at the lake's York Hill Access.

== Angling ==
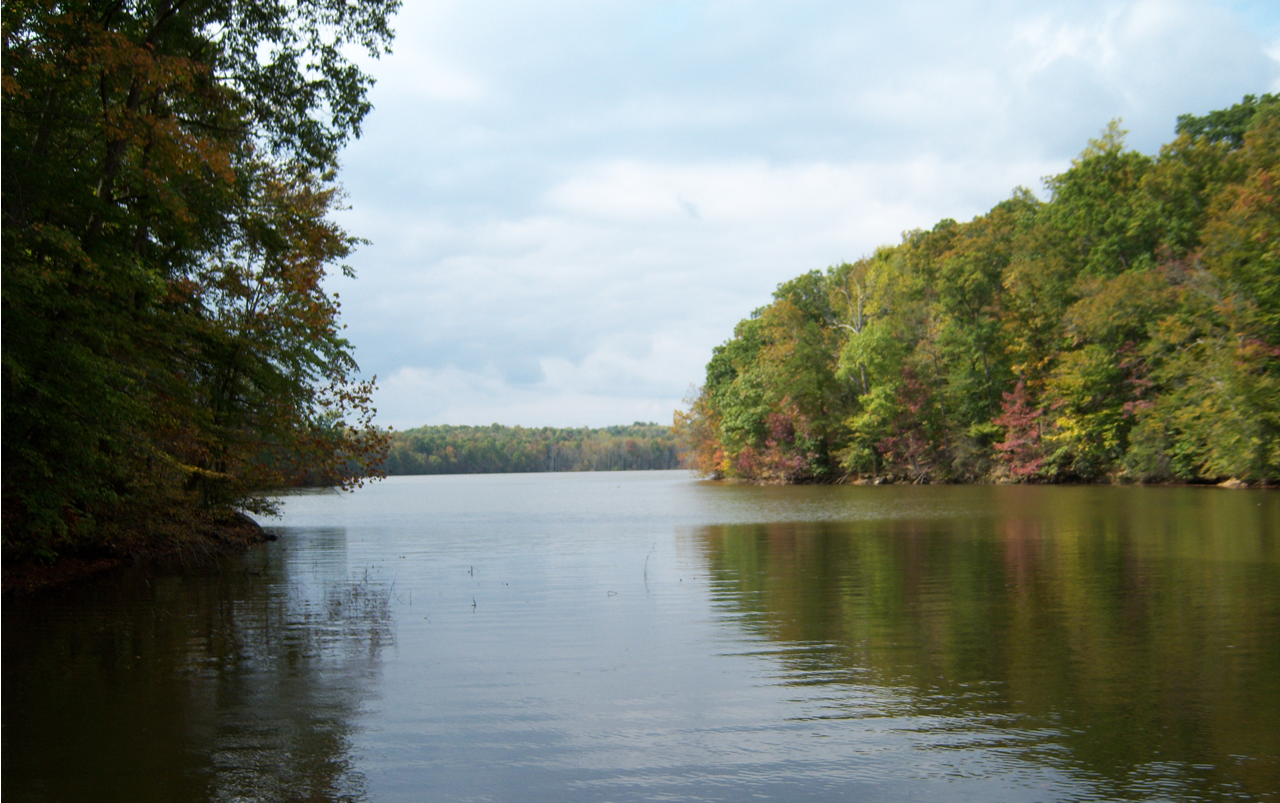
Cove along the north end of Abbotts Creek

High Rock Lake is considered one of the best fishing lakes of North Carolina. It has been the host of Bassmaster Tournaments, including the Bassmaster Classic in 1994, 1995, and 1998 and is the site of frequent other angling competitions. The lake has ample channel, blue, and flathead catfish, plus crappie and several different sunfish such as bluegill, shellcracker and others. Striper and their hybrids as well as white bass are also abundant. The lake is best known for its quantity and quality of largemouth bass, which attract anglers from all over the United States. This is likely due to the relatively shallow nature of the lake and the tremendous amount of habitat that favor the bass.

== Residential restrictions ==
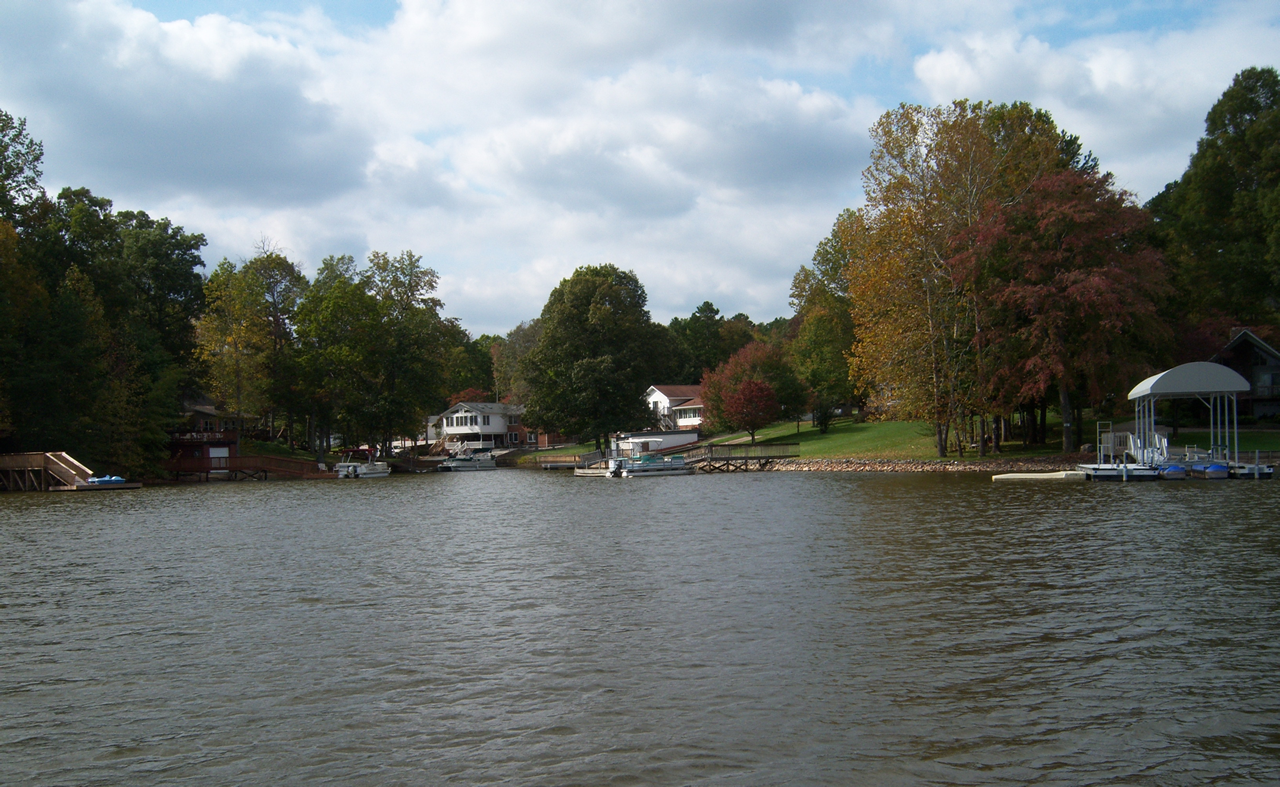
Typical neighborhood. Homes span all sizes and types.

Much of High Rock Lake is lined with privately owned homes, representing all income levels. Prior to 2008, Alcoa had required that all new homes have 8 feet (2.4 m) of water when at full pond and have 200 feet (61 m) of lake frontage before a private pier permit is issued. Boat ramps and boathouses are no longer allowed to be built, although existing structures that are maintained are grandfathered. Retaining walls at the high water mark are only allowed in extreme cases, although existing structures can be maintained. Private piers are required to be of a floating style, allowing them to be usable even with lowered water levels. The new 38 year FERC License allows greater flexibility to add roof structures over many existing piers and modifying pier sizes, as well as a few other changes that offer somewhat more flexibility to existing lake front home owners.

== Access ==
There are several public ramps that can be accessed at no charge, and private ramps that can be accessed for a small fee. The lake has no restrictions on boat motor size and personal water craft are legal for use. There are no restrictions to access or use and it is available for use 24 hours a day. There are a number of campgrounds that adjoin the lake, some offering year round space rentals that also provide access to guests.

== Hydroelectric power ==
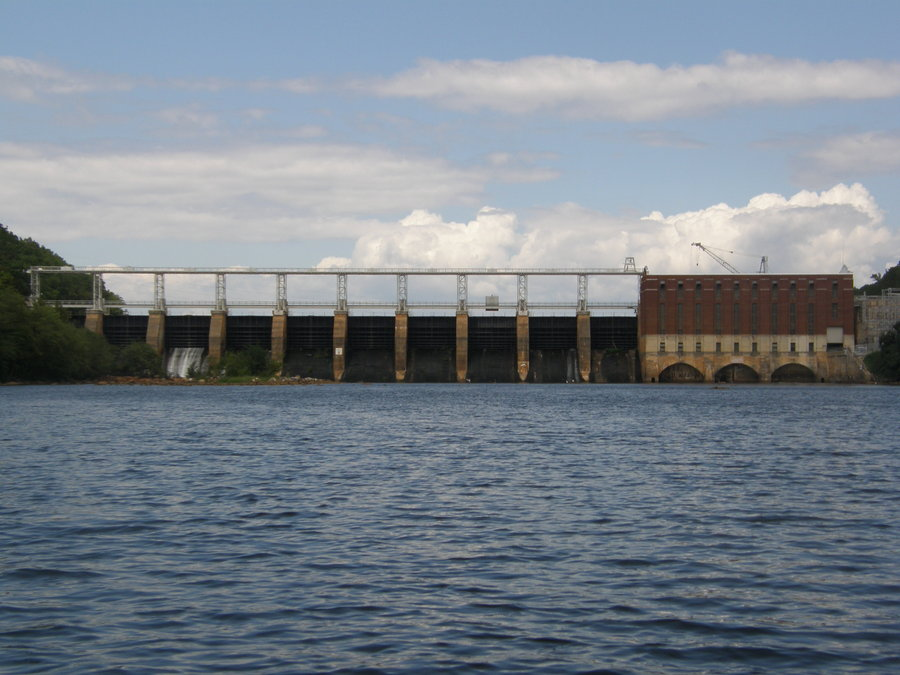
High Rock Dam, built in 1926-27. There are three turbines housed within the power house, with a total capacity of 40.2 MW.

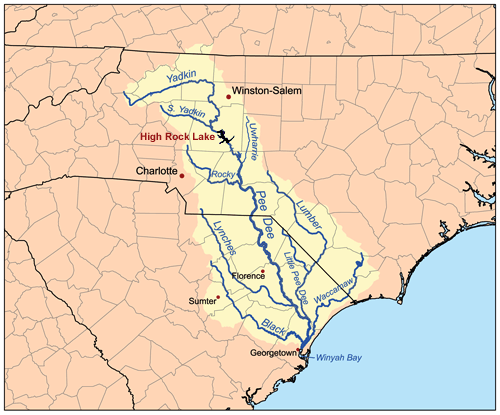
High Rock Lake is part of the Yadkin/Pee Dee river basin

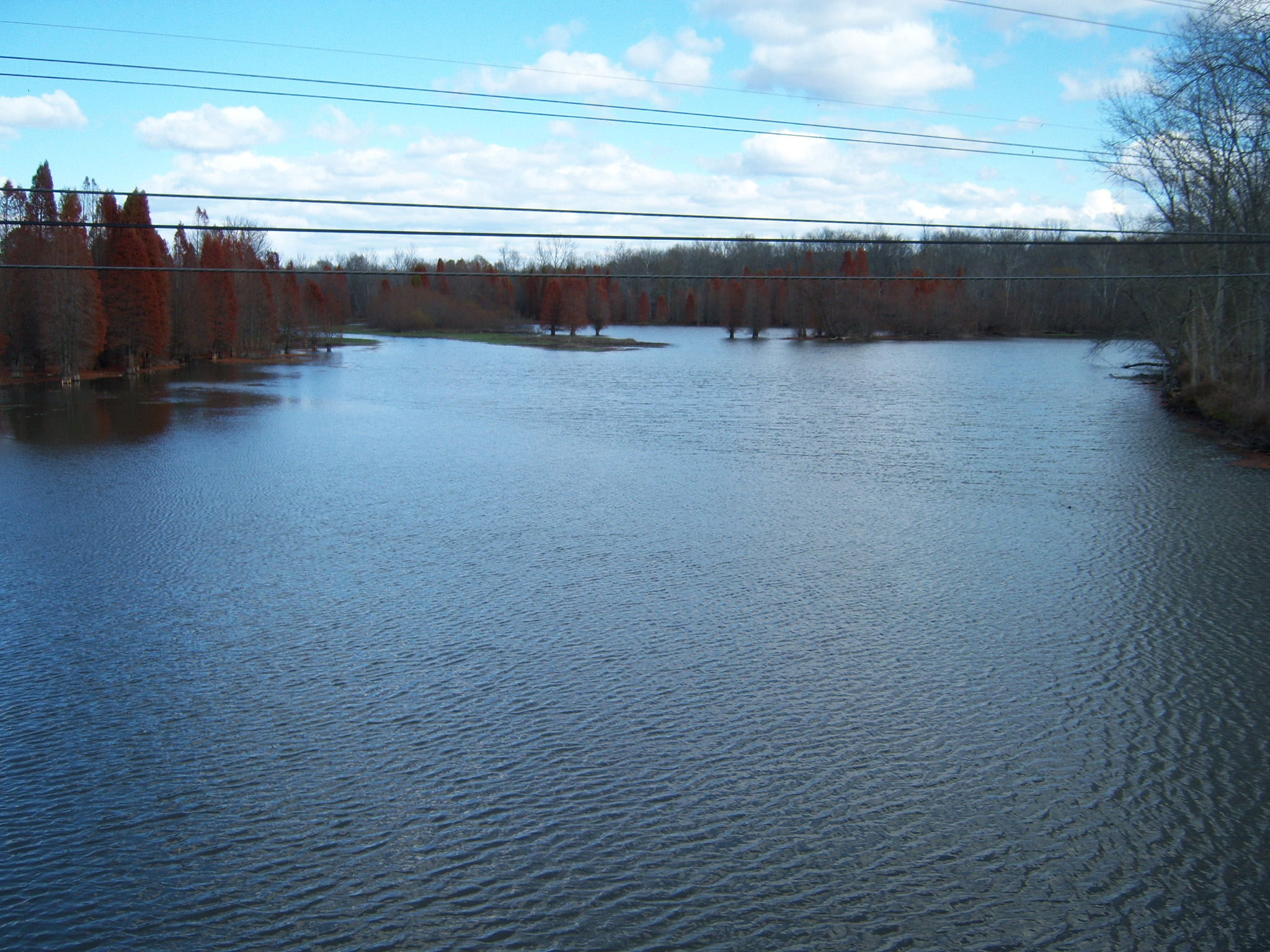
Abbotts Creek where it becomes High Rock Lake, view from Hwy 47

High Rock Lake was formed as one of four Yadkin Project hydroelectric dams built by ALCOA for the purpose of producing the electricity needed for the smelting of aluminum during a time when electricity was still scarce in many rural areas of North Carolina. As public utilities developed, the power generated by the project eventually became integrated into the power grid and used to offset the power consumed by the aluminum smelter. The entire Yadkin Project has a total generating capacity of nearly 215 megawatts of electricity when operating at peak capacity. Because High Rock is the most upstream lake in the series, it was used not only to generate power, but also to regulate water levels in the project's lakes downstream. This management policy often resulted in extreme draw-downs during periods of low inflow.

The period after World War II saw explosive growth in recreational use of High Rock as the company sold off vast tracts of the land it owned above the lake's high water mark. This set the stage for conflict over the company's management of the lake's water as the new owners often found themselves staring at vast areas of dry lake bed in front of their lake front property during the dry summer months. Eventually, agreements were reached that resulted in more stable summer lake levels.

While hydroelectric electricity may produce less green house gas emissions than fossil fuel power plants, the Yadkin Project dams also have a history of environmental impacts, with low dissolved oxygen in the tailraces of multiple dams and water quality violations for turbidity, ph and chlorophyll-a on High Rock Lake. and fish consumption advisories for PCBs on Badin Lake. As of 2020, these problems are being mitigated through the modernizing of turbine equipment to provide for aeration of the water passing through the powerhouse facilities.

== Drought and environmental impact ==
=== 2001-2002 drought ===
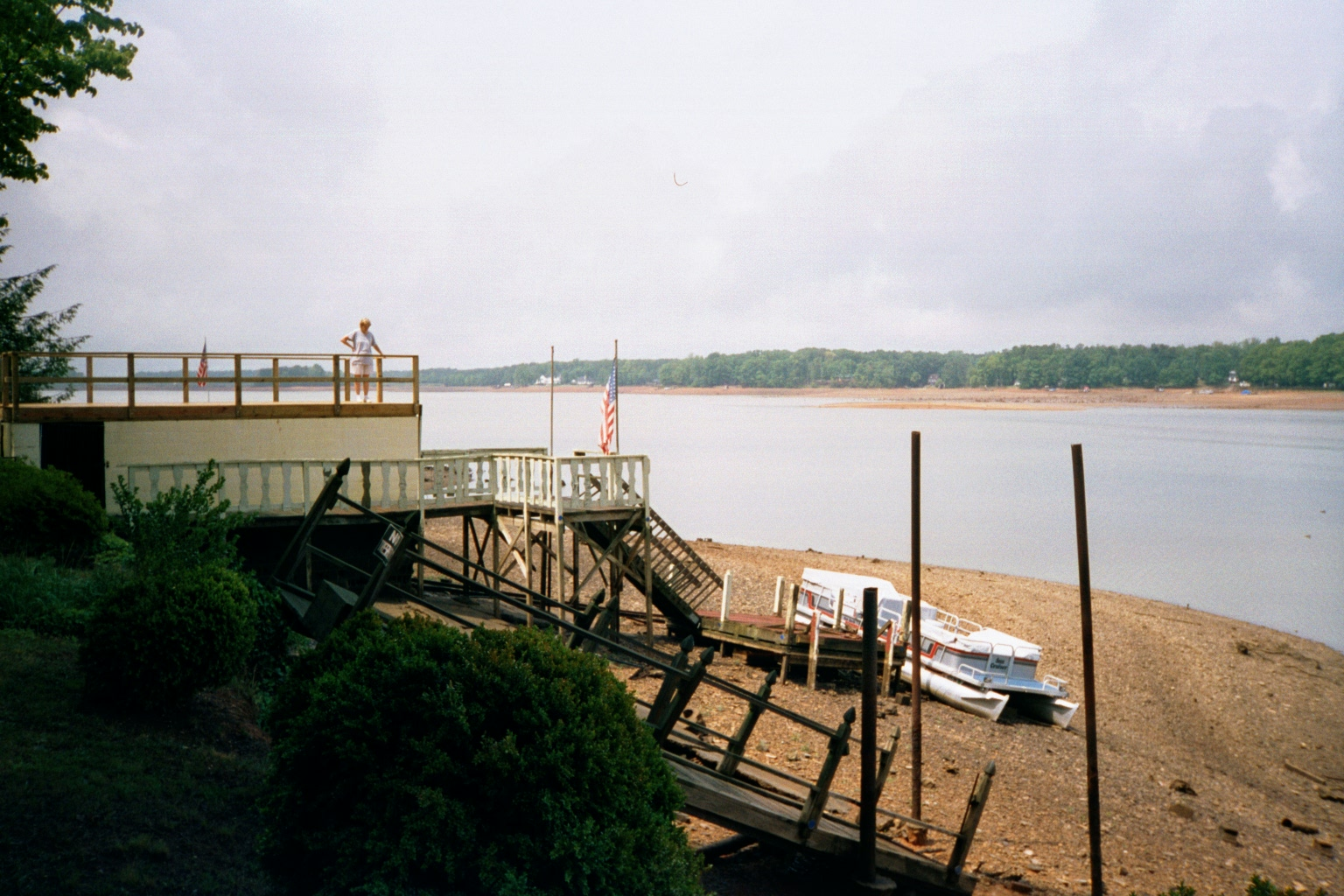
High Rock Lake (Abbotts Creek arm) in the drought of 2002

Record low streamflows caused by unusually dry weather resulted in extremely low water levels at High Rock Lake during the Southeastern United States Drought of 2002. These dry weather patterns began in 1998 and persisted until 2002. The final year of the drought was the worst for the lake. With water levels well below full pond, fish began to die due to overcrowding and a lack of water oxygen content, filling the air with rancid smells. Tourism in the area dropped and residents along the lake began to complain. When water levels plummeted to six feet above the "run of river" state (24 feet below normal), federal and state agencies closed the High Rock dam, forcing reservoirs like Badin Lake and Lake Tillery (who were at full pond status) to pick up the slack to maintain flows on the lower Yadkin/Pee Dee River. This allowed High Rock Lake to return to a level of 17 feet (5.2 m) below full pond before going down again. In the fall of 2002, the drought eased up and the Yadkin Valley experienced one of the wettest 15 months on record. By the end of 2003, water tables in the area were back to normal levels.

=== 2007–2008 drought ===
Until Hurricane Fay passed through the area in late August 2008, most of North Carolina was experiencing drought levels that ranged from Severe to Exceptional (the highest level), with rainfall averages below yearly average for the entire state, including the entire Yadkin-Pee Dee watershed. Alcoa was keeping water levels at slightly higher than historical levels for the same time of year for that reason, and possibly because their contract with the US government expired in April 2008 and was being renegotiated while Alcoa operated under a renewable one-year license. While the hurricane brought tremendous amounts of rain in a short period, filling all area lakes, it did little to replenish ground water levels, which create much of the runoff that continuously feeds streams and lakes statewide. Thirty days after receiving up to 10 inches (250 mm) of rain, most of the state still remained in mild to moderate drought status, with exceptional drought conditions (the highest level) persisting in the southwestern section of the state.

Because the 2002 drought was severe enough to not allow the launching of boats for fishing (or any other purpose), the number of fish that were killed off may have been proportional to the number that would have been caught and kept. The current number of fish in the lake appears to be close to normal. This is further demonstrated by the success of the May 2007 Bass Master's Tournament, and that there are no additional restrictions placed on the lake for fish size, excepting the longstanding restriction for crappie, which have a minimum size restriction of 8 inches (200 mm). Many of the images of fish kills show the primary victim fishes as carp, which are not highly prized in the area and have since made a comeback in numbers.

=== Drought management ===
During the 2007-2008 drought, Alcoa sought and obtained permission from the U.S. Government to reduce the output from High Rock Lake from 1,400 cu ft/s (40 m^{3}/s) to 900 cu ft/s (25 m^{3}/s) during the fall, which allowed it to maintain higher lake levels. The 2008 protocols allowed Alcoa to reduce the output at the dam to be equal to the amount of water entering the lake through various creeks and the Yadkin River. While this didn't allow the lake level to rise in dry periods, it prevented rapid decreases in the lake level and helped to maintain a steady waterflow for cities that used water from the river downstream, particularly in South Carolina which has no dams or reservoirs on the Yadkin/Pee Dee river. This had the additional environmental benefit to wildlife that depends on the lakes and river for habitat, as the river flows and lake levels fluctuate less dramatically.

Additionally, Alcoa operated the lake using new guidelines that allow for parity in the lake levels of High Rock and Badin, farther downstream. Previously, Badin Lake had to be maintained at a level no lower than 2-foot (0.61 m) below full pond as long as High Rock could provide the water fast enough. New regulations expected to take effect in the new contract due in 2008 would make these temporary measures permanent, reducing the likelihood that High Rock would see lake levels that exceed 20 feet (6.1 m) below full pond again. As a result of the new procedures, High Rock has been kept at near-record highs during late 2007 and early 2008. This was accomplished although the total inflow of water is less than it was during the 2002 drought, demonstrating that the previous conditions were related to both a lack of rainfall and antiquated lake management rules that were agreed to in the 1958 contract.

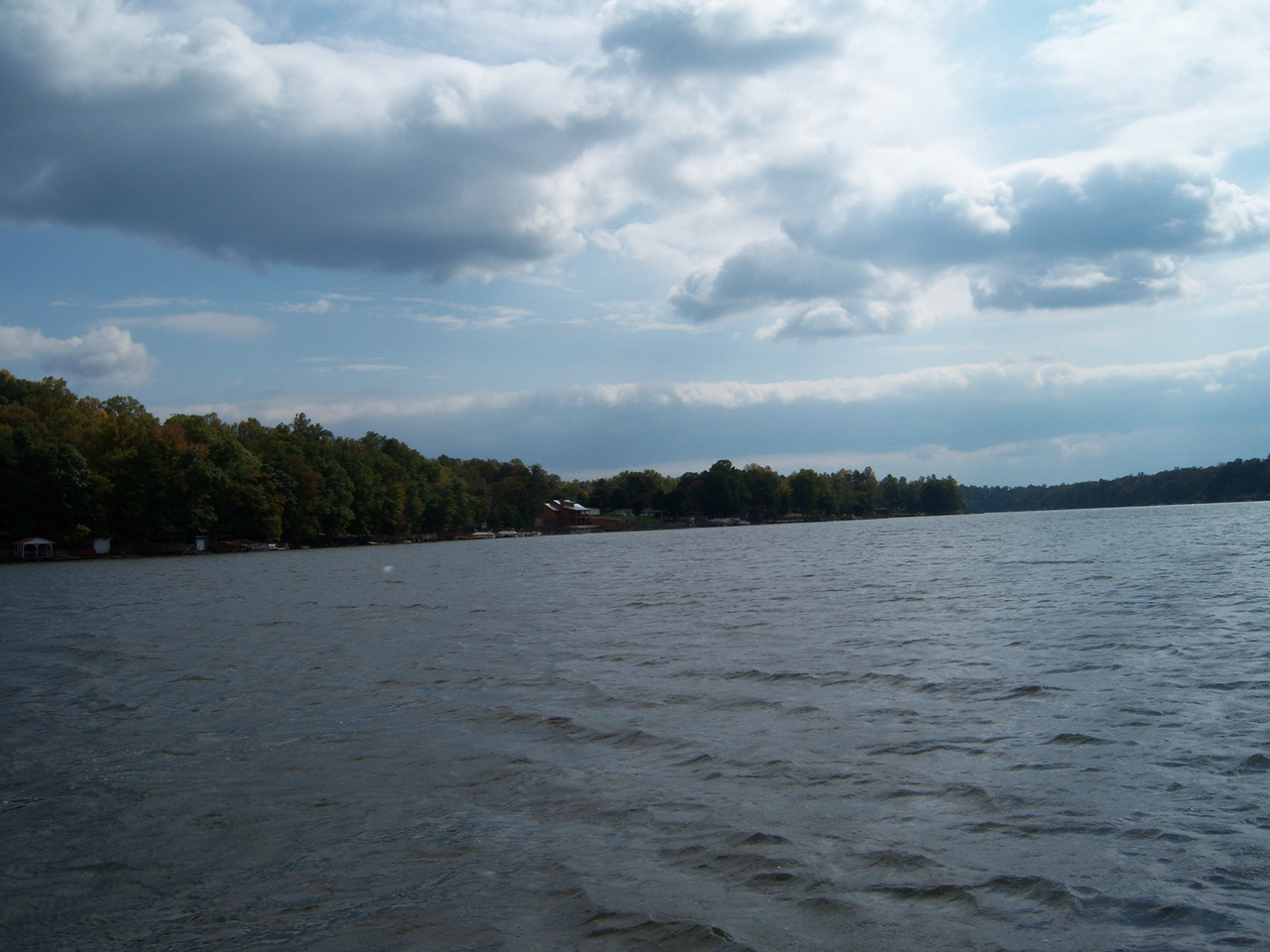
Main channel in the northern end of Abbotts Creek arm of High Rock Lake

== See also ==
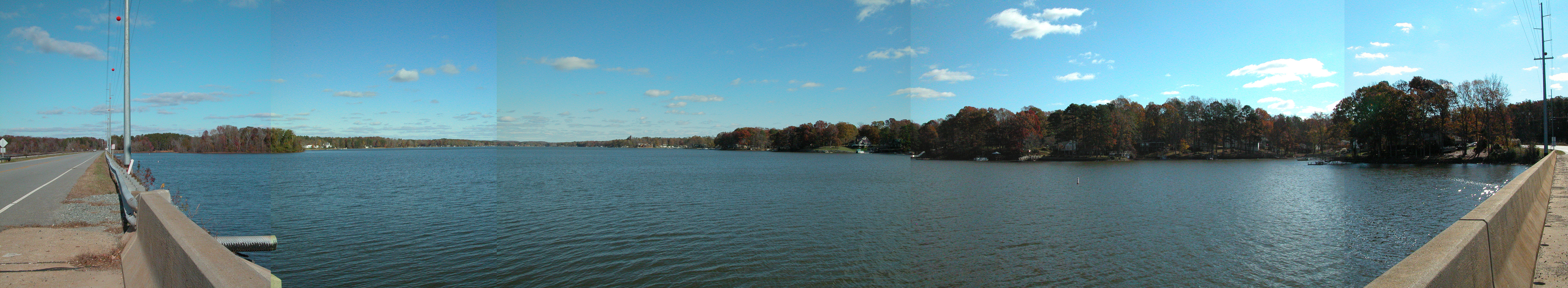
Large composite panoramic image of part of Abbotts Creek arm as seen from Hwy 8

- Abbotts Creek
- Alcoa Power Generating Inc.
- High Rock Lake Association
- Hydroelectricity
- Yadkin-Pee Dee River Basin
