= Bringle Ferry Bridge =

- Coordinates: 35°35′48″N 80°13′54″W
- Crosses: Yadkin River

The Bringle Ferry Bridge is a crossing of the Yadkin River Channel and the Tuckertown Reservoir in Rowan County, North Carolina and Davidson County, North Carolina. The bridge is on Bringle Ferry Road between Salisbury, North Carolina and Denton, North Carolina. It is the only crossing of the Yadkin River between the Interstate 85 bridge at Spencer, North Carolina and the NC Hwy 49 bridge near Richfield, North Carolina. The Bringle Ferry Bridge has views of the High Rock Dam to the north, which separates Tuckertown Reservoir from High Rock Lake.

On 22 May 2025, one of the lanes of the Bringle Ferry bridge had to be closed due to an incident.
