= Carolina fantail darter =

Conservation status
- Least Concern (IUCN 3.1)

Scientific classification
- Kingdom: Animalia
- Phylum: Chordata
- Class: Actinopterygii
- Order: Perciformes
- Family: Percidae
- Genus: Etheostoma
- Species: E. brevispinum

Binomial name
- Etheostoma brevispinum (Coker, 1926)

Species of fish

The Carolina fantail darter (Etheostoma brevispinum) is a small species of freshwater ray-finned fish, a darter from the subfamily Etheostomatinae, part of the family Percidae, which also contains the perches, ruffes and pikeperches. It is endemic to the eastern United States, where it occurs in the Santee and Savannah River drainages and Yadkin River system (downstream to and including the South Yadkin River and Bear Creek) of the Pee Dee River drainage in North Carolina, northern South Carolina and southern Virginia. This species can reach a length of 6.3 cm (2.5 in).
