= Birkhead Mountains Wilderness =

Wilderness area in North Carolina, United States

- IUCN category Ib (wilderness area)
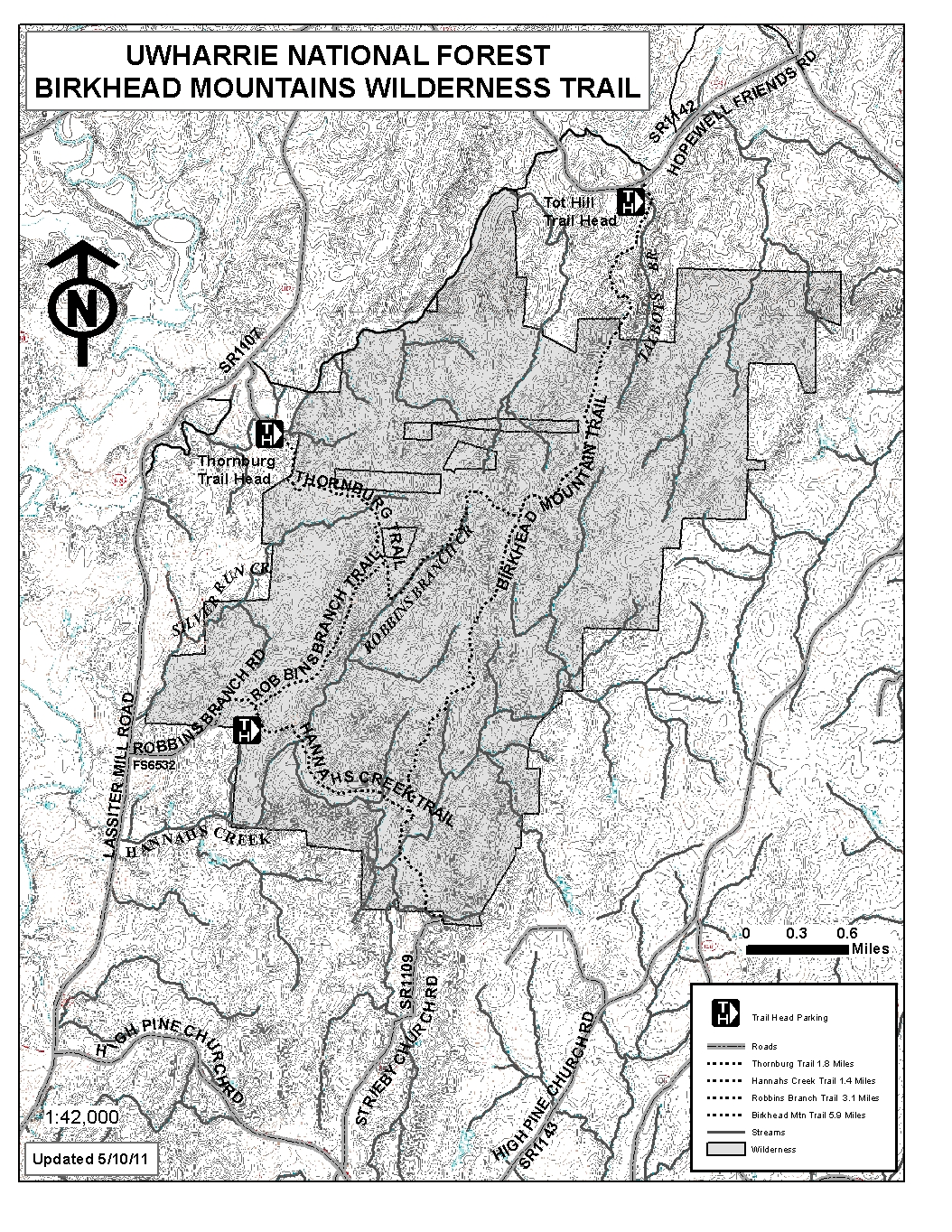
- Trail map of the Wilderness Area

- Location within the United States
- Location: Randolph County, North Carolina, USA
- Nearest city: Asheboro
- Coordinates: 35°36′10″N 79°55′18″W
- Area: 5,160 acres (21 km^{2})
- Established: 1984
- Governing body: U.S. Forest Service
- Website: Birkhead Mountains Wilderness

The Birkhead Mountains Wilderness was established by the 1984 North Carolina Wilderness Act and covers 5,160 acres (20.9 km^{2}) in the Uwharrie National Forest at the northern end of the Uwharrie Mountains, in central North Carolina.

== History ==
The mountain range in and around the wilderness are considered to be the oldest on the North American continent. Evidence of early Native American settlement dates back over 12,000 years. The Catawba Indians inhabited the area when the Europeans began exploring the region in the late 1600s. By 1760 settlement had begun in earnest, opened up by the explorers and traders along the Ocaneechi Trail.

A plantation once owned by John Watson Birkhead (b. 1858) forms the core of the wilderness. The 3,000 acres (12 km^{2}) Birkhead acquired over the years were made up of many small tenant farms. The mountain range was known locally as the Birkhead Mountains.

Evidence of early Native American and other settlers can often be found.

== Recreation ==
All trails within the wilderness are designated hiking trails. Travel by horse or vehicle is prohibited. Dispersed camping is allowed.

== See also ==
- List of U.S. Wilderness Areas
- Wilderness Act
