= Badin Lake =

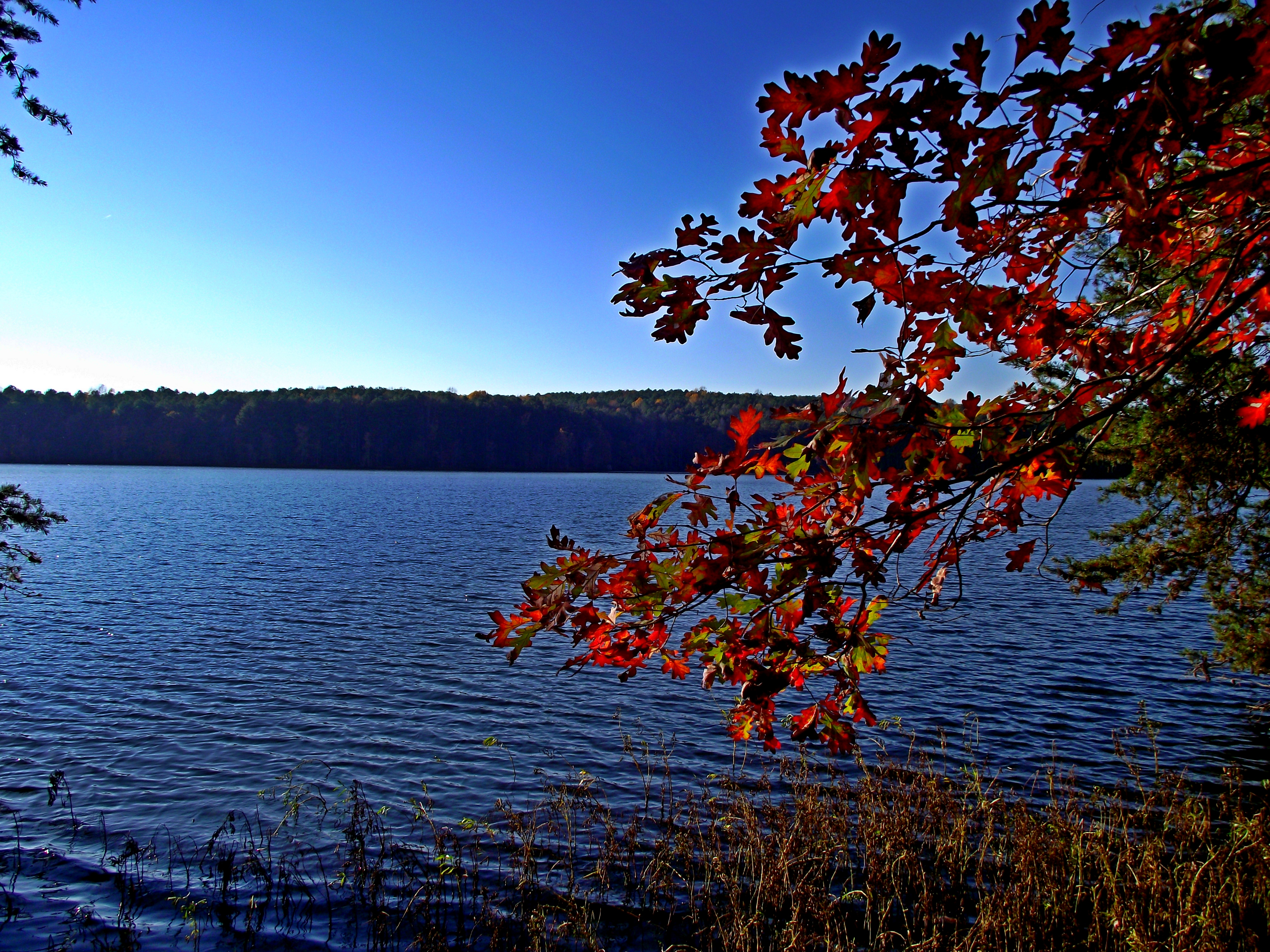
- Badin Lake, viewed from Uwharrie National Forest, Montgomery County NC

- Location within North Carolina Location within the United States
- Location: Uwharrie Lakes Region, North Carolina
- Coordinates: 35°25′11″N 80°05′34″W
- Type: reservoir
- Primary inflows: Yadkin River
- Primary outflows: Yadkin River
- Basin countries: United States
- Surface area: 5,350 acres (21.7 km^{2})
- Max. depth: 190 ft (58 m) (locals say over 300 ft (91 m))
- Shore length^{1}: 115 mi (185 km)
- Surface elevation: 539 feet (164 m)
- ^{1} Shore length is not a well-defined measure.

Badin Lake is one of a series of lakes created by the damming of the Yadkin-Pee Dee River in the Uwharrie Lakes Region of the United States. The Badin Lake Dam was built in 1917 to support local aluminum smelting plant, Alcoa, and the associated community of Badin was named for the founder, Adrien Badin. The power generation unit was sold to Cube Hydro Carolinas in February 2017. Badin Lake is in the Piedmont area of North Carolina. It is contained by Narrows Dam at the town of Badin, North Carolina. Sitting within a valley, the lake is very deep, with a maximum depth of 190 ft (58 m). The lake occupies 5,350 acres (22 km^{2}) and has 115 mi (185 km) of shoreline. Its waters have an average summer temperature of 84.4 °F (29.1 °C) and an average winter temperature of 50.6 °F (10.3 °C). No ferries cross Badin Lake. The northernmost point of Morrow Mountain State Park is roughly 2 miles (3.2 km) downstream from Narrows Dam. The lake lies within Stanly, Davidson, Montgomery, and Rowan counties. Much of the lake's eastern shoreline lies within the Uwharrie National Forest.

== Recreation ==
Badin Lake offers both residents and visitors a wide range of recreational opportunities such as golf, fishing, boating, hiking, camping, and hunting.

Badin Lake has many game fish, including Largemouth Bass, Crappie, Catfish, Spotted Bass, White Bass, and Striped Bass. There are no Trout in Badin Lake.

== 1944 Plane Crash ==
Quoting from the abstract of the U.S. Navy's publication on one of their historic aircraft wrecks:

PBJ-89050, a U.S. Navy version of the B-25, crashed into Badin Lake, North Carolina on June 8, 1944. The crew consisted of pilot Second Lieutenant Charles M. McDaniel, USMC and co-pilot Ensign John E. Withrow, USNR. 2nd Lt. McDaniel and Ens. Withrow were ferrying the plane from Ohio to Cherry Point, NC, but had made an unauthorized detour over McDaniel's family home in Palmerville as a romantic gesture to his bride of seven months. For unknown reasons the plane crashed in the lake and both crewmembers were lost. Speculation over the cause of the crash ranged from pilot error to equipment failure. Navy divers and salvage teams arrived shortly after the crash and located the plane, but were unable to retrieve the crewmen. The plane has remained undisturbed since then.

— Wendy M. Coble, U.S. Navy, Naval History and Heritage Command

== Gallery ==
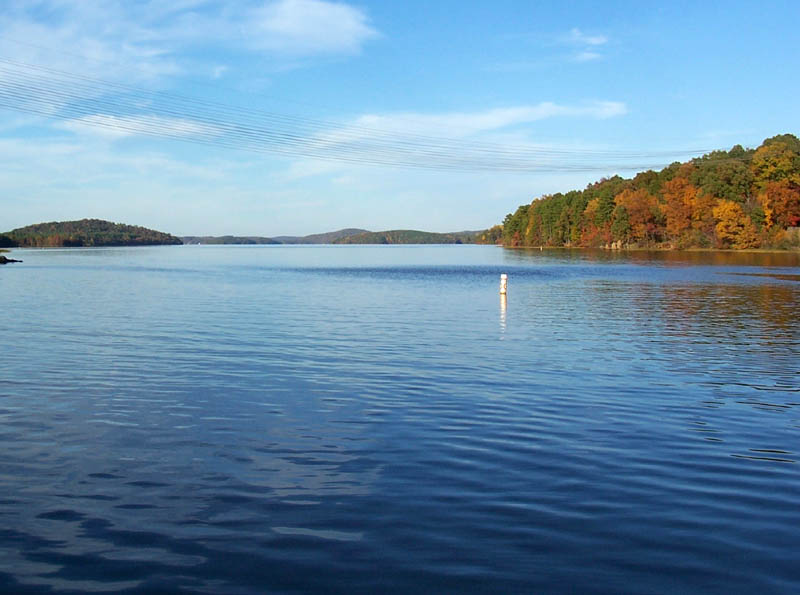
Badin Lake viewed from the boat launch in Badin, NC.

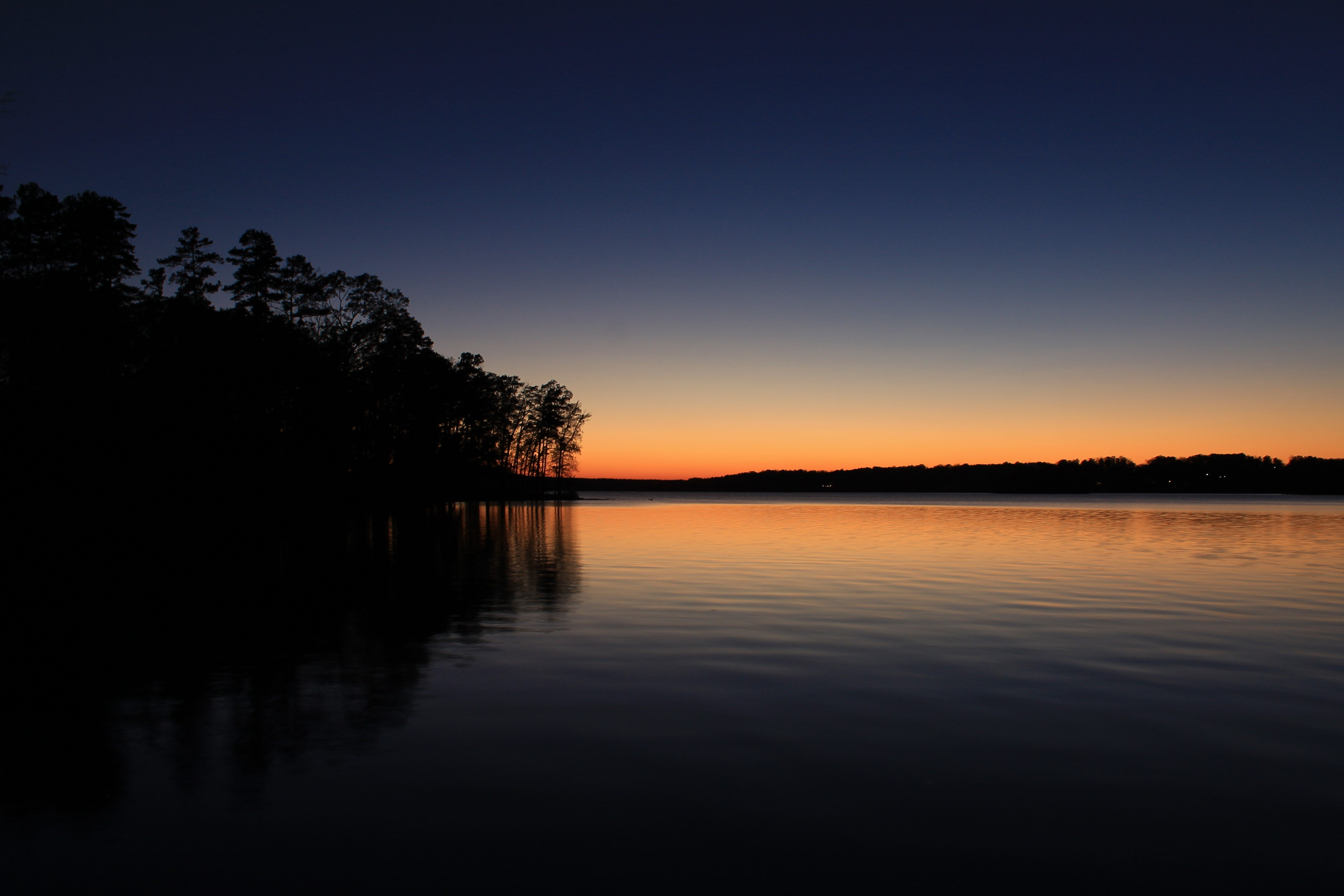
Badin Lake from Kings Mountain Point, evening exposure looking west

== See also ==
- Narrows Dam and Power Plant Complex
- Uwharrie National Forest
- High Rock Lake
- Yadkin-Pee Dee River Basin
- Lake Tillery
