= Falls Reservoir =

- Location within North Carolina Location within the United States
- Location: Montgomery / Stanly counties, North Carolina, United States
- Coordinates: 35°23′43″N 080°04′29″W
- Type: reservoir
- Primary inflows: Yadkin River
- Primary outflows: Yadkin River
- Basin countries: United States
- Surface area: 204 acres (83 ha)
- Surface elevation: 292 ft (89 m)

Falls Reservoir is part of the Yadkin River Project in North Carolina and managed by Alcoa as part of their hydroelectric business. It is the last of four reservoirs along a 38-mile (61 km) stretch of the Yadkin River. Falls Reservoir is the smallest of the four reservoirs and covers 204 acres (0.83 km^{2}) and has a shoreline length of 6 miles (9.7 km). The hydroelectric operation was sold to Cube Hydro Carolinas in February 2017.

== Other lakes in the Yadkin River Project ==
- High Rock Lake
- Tuckertown Reservoir
- Badin Lake
