= South Yadkin River =

South Yadkin River South Fork Yadkin River, Sapona
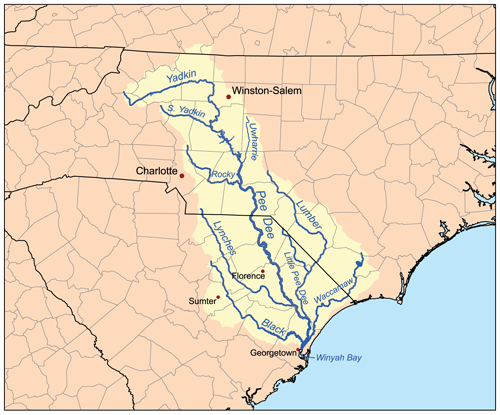

- Confluence of the South Yadkin River and Yadkin River at High Rock Lake.

Location
- Country: United States
- State: North Carolina
- Counties: Alexander, Davie, Iredell, Rowan, Wilkes

Physical characteristics
- Source
  - location: Alexander County
  - coordinates: 36.0329095°N 81.1561943°W
- Mouth: Confluence with the Yadkin River
  - location: above High Rock Lake
  - coordinates: 35.7456947°N 80.4608909°W
- Length: 75 mi-long (121 km)

Basin features
- Progression: South Yadkin River → Yadkin River → Pee Dee River → Atlantic Ocean
- River system: Yadkin–Pee Dee River Basin
- Tributaries
  - left: Snow Creek, Rocky Creek, Hunting Creek, Bear Creek
  - right: Fourth Creek, Third Creek, Second Creek
- GNIS: 995225

The South Yadkin River is a 75 mi (121 km) long river that flows through Alexander, Davie, Iredell, Rowan, and Wilkes counties of North Carolina. The mouth is located north of High Rock Lake, where the South Yadkin River meets the Yadkin River. Major cities along the course of the South Yadkin River include, Statesville in Iredell County and Cooleemee in Davie County. The South Yadkin River forms the border of Davie and Rowan counties. High Rock Lake begins at the confluence of the South Yadkin River and the similarly named and larger Yadkin River.

== Tributaries ==
Major tributaries of the South Yadkin River include:

- Hunting Creek
- Fourth Creek (see also Fourth Creek Congregation)
- Third Creek
- Second Creek and tributaries: Withrow's Creek, Back Creek, Cathy's Creek, and Sill's Creek

Sill's Creek was named for an early settler, John Sill, who settled there in 1749. Cathy's Creek was named for James Cathey, another early Rowan County settler. The Back Creek Presbyterian Church, named for the Creek, was founded in 1805.

South Yadkin River Images and Maps
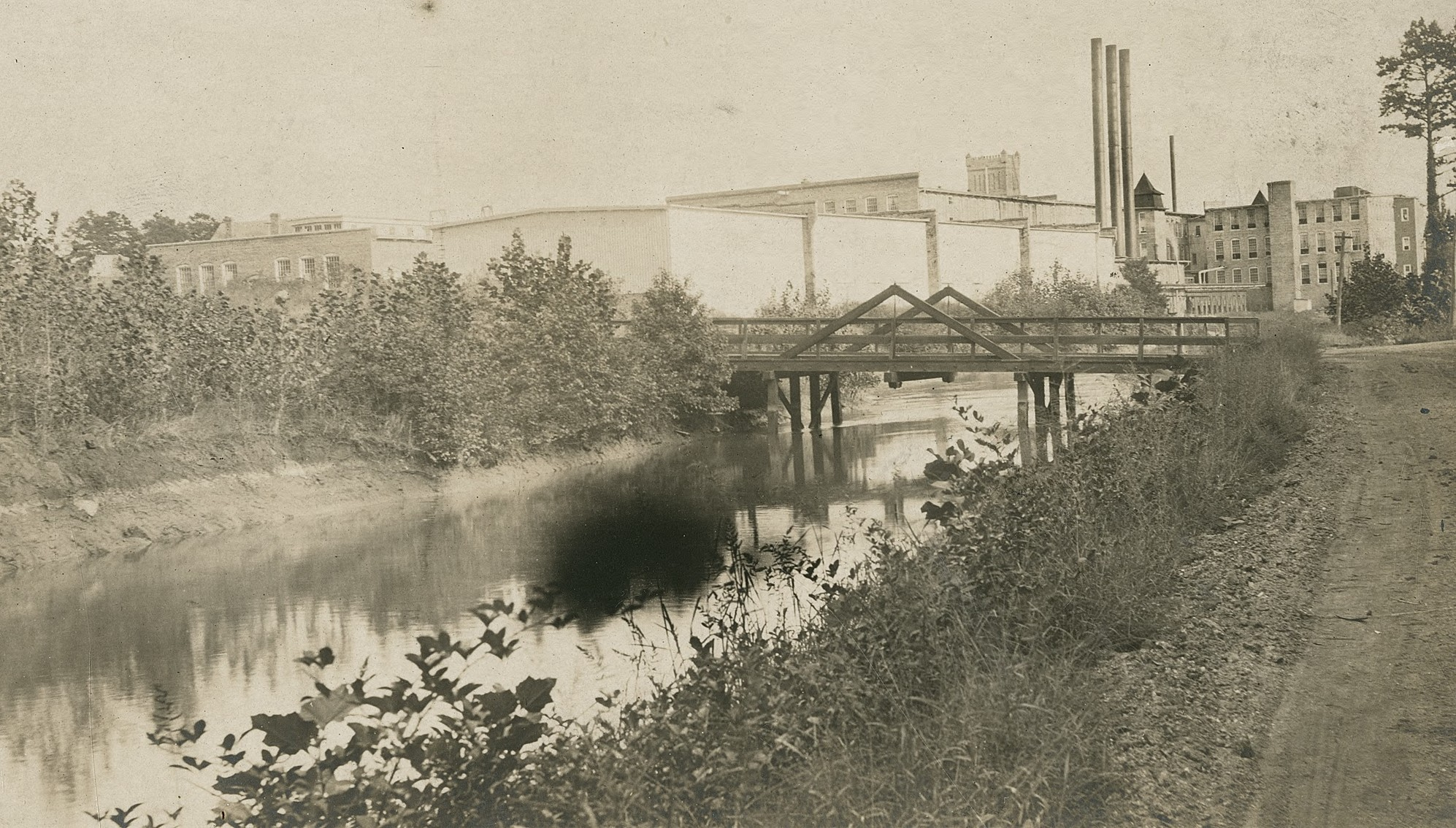
South Yadkin River, Erwin Mills, Cooleemee in 1899

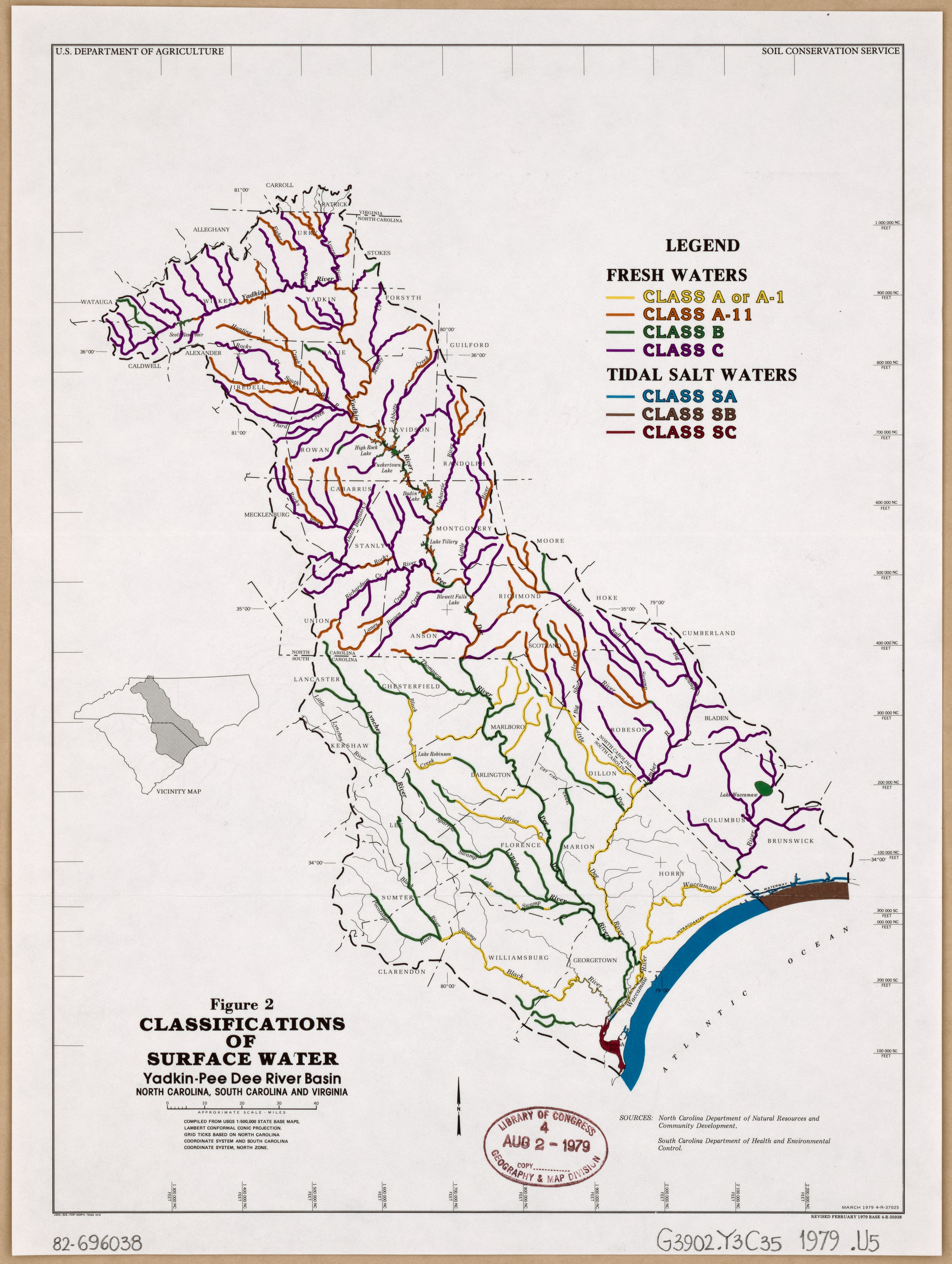
Classifications of Surface Water, Yadkin-Pee Dee River Basin

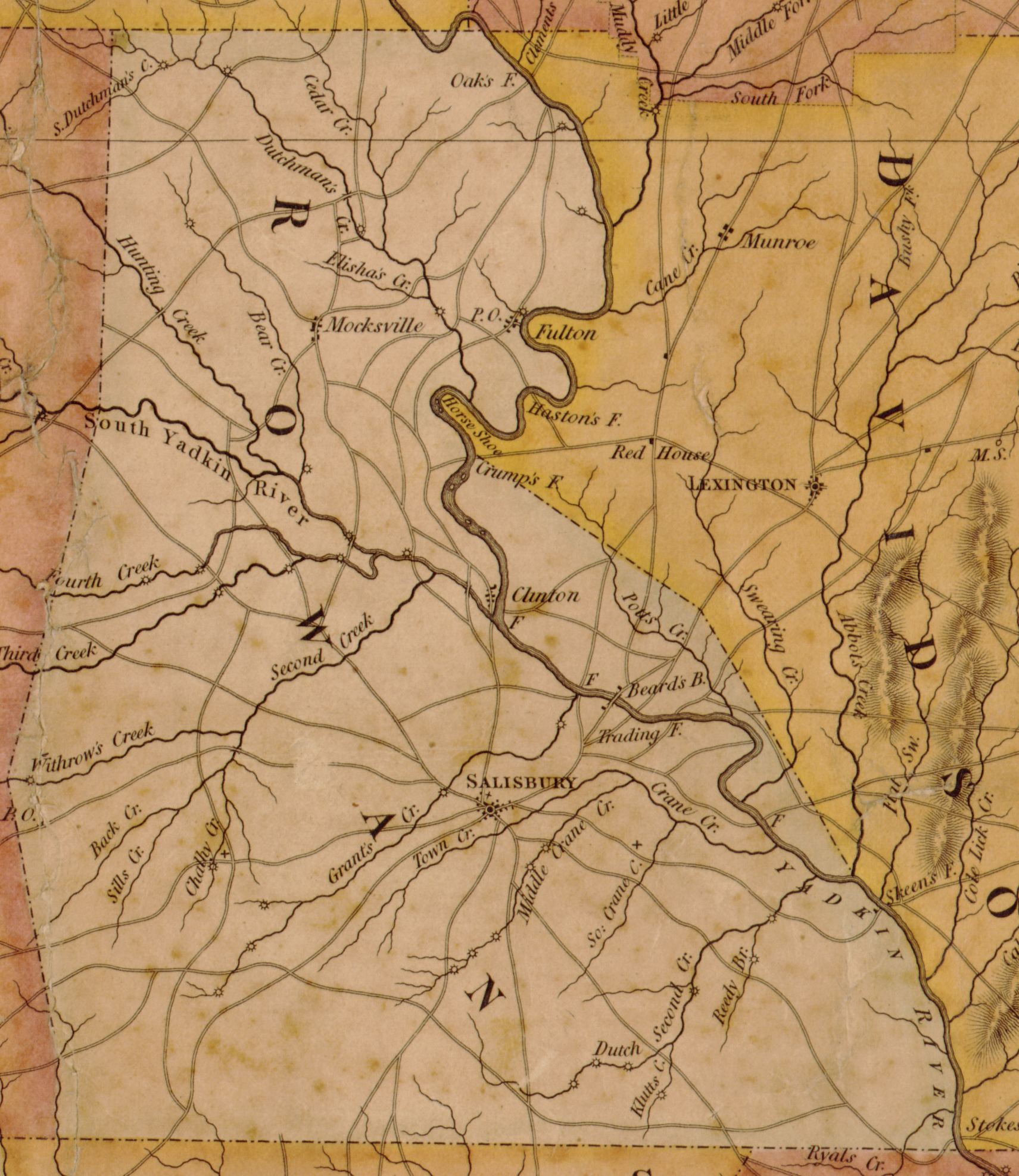
1833 Map of Rowan County showing the South Yadkin River and tributaries
