= Blewett Falls Lake =

- Location within North Carolina Location within the United States
- Location: Anson / Richmond counties, North Carolina, United States
- Coordinates: 34°58′58″N 79°52′40″W
- Type: reservoir
- Primary inflows: Great Pee Dee River
- Primary outflows: Great Pee Dee River
- Basin countries: United States
- Surface area: 2,560 acres (1,040 ha)
- Surface elevation: 178 ft (54 m)

Blewett Falls Lake (sometimes incorrectly spelled as Blewitt Falls Lake) is a reservoir located in Anson and Richmond counties in the U.S. state of North Carolina. No bridges span the lake. It is a major lake in the Uwharrie Lakes Region and the southernmost and widest body in this chain of lakes. Created by the damming of the Great Pee Dee River, the lake occupies the former Blewett Falls on that river, which were named after an early local family. The lake was created for hydropower in the early 20th century.

The lake is located at 34°58′58″N 79°52′40″W and has a surface area of 2,560 acres (10 km^{2}) at an elevation of 178 ft (54 m) above sea level with 34 mi (55 km) of shoreline..

== Aircraft crash ==
On April 28, 1992, a United States Air Force Lockheed C-130E Hercules, (AF Ser. No. 64-0501, c/n 3985, of the 317th Tactical Airlift Wing) from Pope AFB crashed into the lake during a training mission. All nine crewmembers were killed.
