= Southmont, North Carolina =

- Census-designated place
- Location within the state of North Carolina
- Coordinates: 35°39′13″N 80°16′12″W
- Country: United States
- State: North Carolina
- County: Davidson

Area
  - Total: 6.56 sq mi (17.00 km^{2})
  - Land: 4.56 sq mi (11.81 km^{2})
  - Water: 2.00 sq mi (5.18 km^{2})
- Elevation: 712 ft (217 m)

Population (2020)
  - Total: 1,563
  - Density: 343/sq mi (132.3/km^{2})
- Time zone: UTC-5 (Eastern (EST))
  - Summer (DST): UTC-4 (EDT)
- ZIP code: 27351
- FIPS code: 37-63360
- GNIS feature ID: 2628657

Southmont is an unincorporated community and census-designated place (CDP) in Davidson County, North Carolina, United States. As of the 2020 census, Southmont had a population of 1,563. It is located along North Carolina State Highway 8 on the northern shores of High Rock Lake. There is an organized effort underway to incorporate the community as "The Village of Southmont".

== Demographics ==
Historical population
Census	Pop.	Note	%±
2020	1,563		—
U.S. Decennial Census

== History ==
The community was founded in 1883 as "Fairmont" with the approval of a post office. The postmaster was Samuel S. Peacock from April 19, 1883, until it closed August 30, 1906. It was located in a country store operated by Mr. Hedrick near where the railroad crosses Hwy 8 today. Within 10 years, however, the community had failed to thrive and the store closed, with the post office surrendering its charter.

Just after the turn of the 20th century, another store opened where the previous store stood, and an attempt to reopen the post office was declined by the postmaster general. It seems that another community had claimed the name "Fairmont". The name "Southmont" was chosen instead to receive the approval of a post office with Meriles S. A. Michaels as the postmaster on March 11, 1911. A village grew up around the crossroads of where the new Winston-Salem Southbound Railway rail line had crossed the road to Lexington.

During the 1920s the town had multiple stores, the county's first consolidated brick school, various churches, the Star Furniture Company, and the Wall Lumber Company. The hotel thrived for a time. Dr. Alvin York set up a practice in town. The Baptist churches of the area included Holloways Baptist Church, Stoners Grove Baptist Church and the First Baptist Church of Southmont. Macedonia Methodist Church was also active by the time the lake was created.

By 1926, with the creation of High Rock Lake, many of the bridges and roads changed or closed, the railroad was elevated, and the route crossing the river changed. Other roads were rerouted as the geography changed. Coupled with the Great Depression, much of the town died, but the school and churches remained. Fires claimed the two industries and the famous eight-gable hotel building, and by the early 1950s with train travel no longer being the favored means of travel, the station closed.

The new Central Davidson High School opened in 1957, with students from the Southmont High School now attending CDHS. The school became grades 1-8 and by the early 1960s people began to build summer cottages at High Rock Lake. 1967 witnessed racial integration of the schools.

By 1972, a temporary middle school was created using an abandoned school at the Junior Order Children's Home, and the 8th grades were consolidated there creating CDJH. During a 1979 bridge repair, Hwy 8 was closed for nearly two years and much of the lake was found to have mercury contamination from a battery plant upstream. Again, businesses closed and the school closed in 1981, consolidated with Linwood near Cotton Grove, known as Southwood. The Southmont Volunteer Fire Department was created in 1958.

Over the past 10 years the community has again seen a resurgence of growth, with multiple small businesses, a new school, new post office, expanded churches, a new fire station, an array of other local civic and community groups, and significant population growth to the lake areas in and around Southmont.
