= High Rock Lake Association =

High Rock Lake Association, Inc.
- Formation: 1954
- Type: Non-profit organization
- Purpose: Environmental protection in High Rock Lake and the surrounding Yadkin Project area
- Location: North Carolina
- Members: Businesses and individuals
- Main organ: Board of Directors
- Volunteers: Yes

The High Rock Lake Association, Inc. (also known as "HRLA") is a non-profit group of businesses and individuals with the common goal of protecting the environment at High Rock Lake and the surrounding Yadkin Project area. It was founded in 1954. They have served as the primary representative for individual home owners and businesses in discussions with the federal government and Alcoa during the 2001-2002 and 2007-2008 droughts, and during the 2008 federal contract resolution. The Board of Directors and Officers are all volunteers who serve without pay. Their main source of income is from contributions and member dues.

== Background ==
High Rock Lake is the second largest lake in North Carolina, and is managed under federal license by Alcoa. The licensing process is years long and has traditionally been relicensed for 50 years at a time, with the latest contract expected to be signed in 2008. The last contract was signed in 1958, at a time when virtually no homes were on the lake and the environment was less of a concern than the hydroelectric power the dam provided.

== History ==
The association is known for protecting the local environment over the years, including fighting to prevent a nuclear power plant from being built on the Yadkin River which would have used up to 75 million gallons of water per day. More recently, the association took a visible role when the lake levels of High Rock Lake dropped to 24 feet below full in 2002. This resulting in a large fish kill and other damage to the environment, as well as the inability of local home owners and visitors to use the facilities of the lake. They have played a significant role in the development of new policies and regulations in the management of the lake levels since the drought.

== Current activities ==
In 2007 and early 2008, the entire State of North Carolina is experiencing a severe drought similar to that of 2001-2002. During this time, Alcoa has been granted permission to operate under the proposed guidelines of the pending 2008 contract, and the lake levels have been dramatically higher than during the previous drought. These new policies were negotiated in part by the Association, which plays a part in all policy modifications and discussions with the FERC.

Their position has sometimes been controversial, such as opposing the City of Salisbury's demand that Alcoa pay for sedimentation removal and they have publicly stated that their goal is to find a balance between the hydroelectric project, local home owners and businesses, and the environment.

== See also ==
- Sustainability
- Biodiversity
- Global warming
- Recycling
- Ecology
- Earth Science
- Natural environment
- Lexington, North Carolina
- Yadkin River
- Hydroelectricity
