= Lake Tillery =

Reservoir in North Carolina, United States

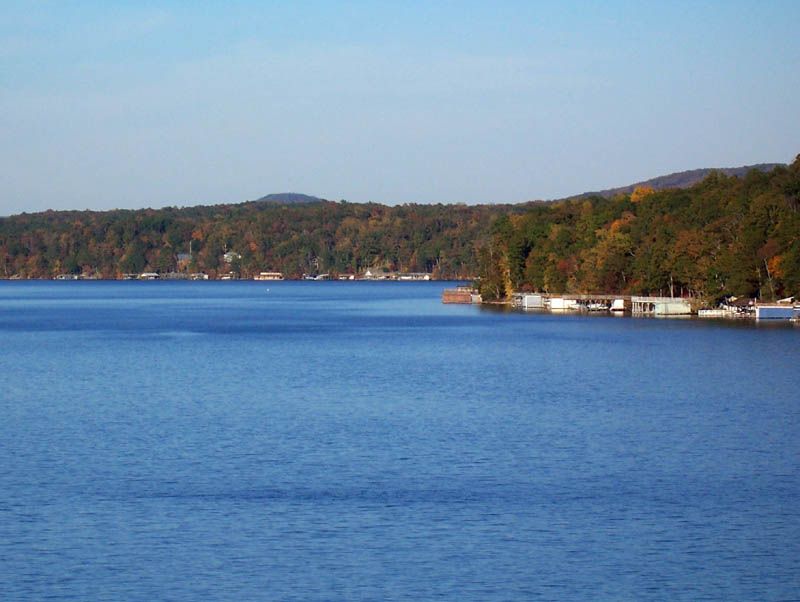

- Location within North Carolina Location within the United States
- Location: Montgomery / Stanly counties, North Carolina, United States
- Coordinates: 35°12′24″N 80°03′58″W
- Primary inflows: Yadkin River Uwharrie River
- Primary outflows: Pee Dee River
- Basin countries: United States
- Max. depth: 200 ft (61 m)
- Shore length^{1}: 117.8 mi (189.6 km)
- Surface elevation: 278 ft (85 m)
- ^{1} Shore length is not a well-defined measure.

Lake Tillery is a reservoir between Falls Reservoir and Blewett Falls Lake in the Uwharrie Lakes Region of North Carolina. It is entirely within Stanly County and Montgomery County, NC. The lake was created by impounding the Pee Dee River, which is created by the confluence of the Yadkin River and the Uwharrie River several miles to the north. Norwood, NC in neighboring Stanly County uses as its town motto "Gateway to Lake Tillery".

== James B. Garrison Bridge ==
The James B. Garrison Bridge is the only crossing of the Pee-Dee-Yadkin River between Badin Lake and Norwood. The bridge carries traffic on North Carolina Highway 24/27/73 across the river and Lake Tillery from Stanly County to Montgomery County. Swift Island Bridge, the water's old crossing parallels the newer two-lane bridge which accompanies it; the older bridge is a narrow one-lane concrete arch bridge built in 1922.

In the 1920s when it was discovered that the 5,000-acre (20 km^{2}) lake to be impounded behind the new dam would cover the original reinforced concrete and steel bridge, Carolina Power & Light (now Duke Energy Progress Inc), owner of the new dam, turned it over to the U.S. military for training purposes. First, engineers were unable to collapse the bridge by overloading it with dead weight. Next, the Army Air Corp dropped bombs on it. Later, an artillery division targeted it with cannon fire. It finally took a ton of TNT to bring the bridge down.

== Tillery Dam ==
Tillery Dam was constructed in 1928 as an 87-megawatt hydroelectric facility owned and operated by Carolina Power, and now owned by Duke Energy. Standing 86 feet (26 m) high, 2,800 feet (850 m) long, and with four generators, the dam is operated to increase the efficiency of the company's Blewett Hydroelectric Plant, about 25 miles (40 km) downstream.

In 2008, in the context of its state licensing, the Southern Environmental Law Center challenged the power company's proposed minimum water flows in the 20-mile (32 km) stretch between Tillery Dam and Blewett Dam. The SELC asserted that the proposed levels would violate the state's water quality standards, damage aquatic wildlife, and disrupt boating.

== Gallery ==
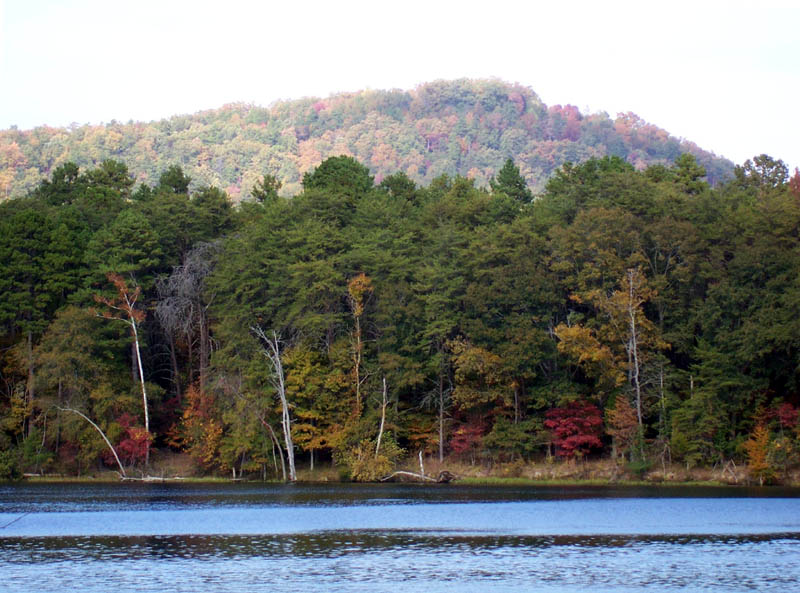
Lake Tillery seen from Morrow Mountain State Park.

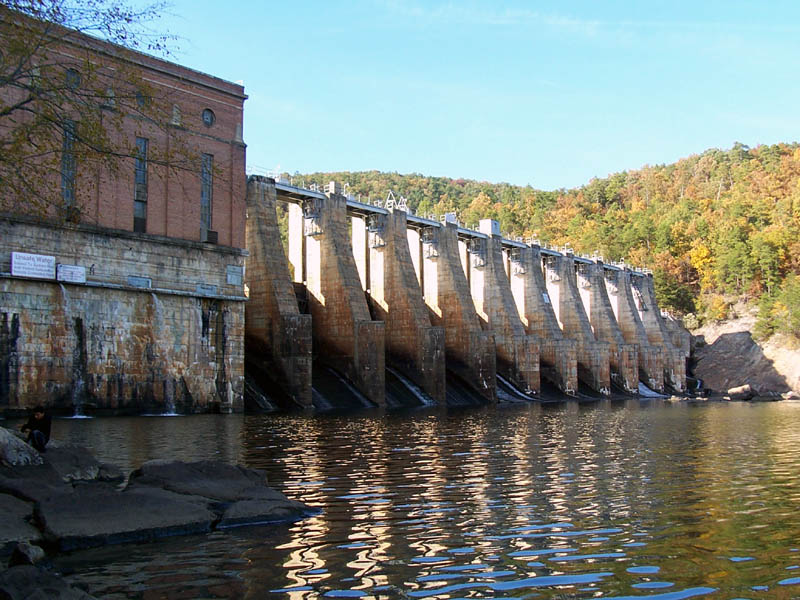
Falls Dam separates Falls Reservoir and Lake Tillery.

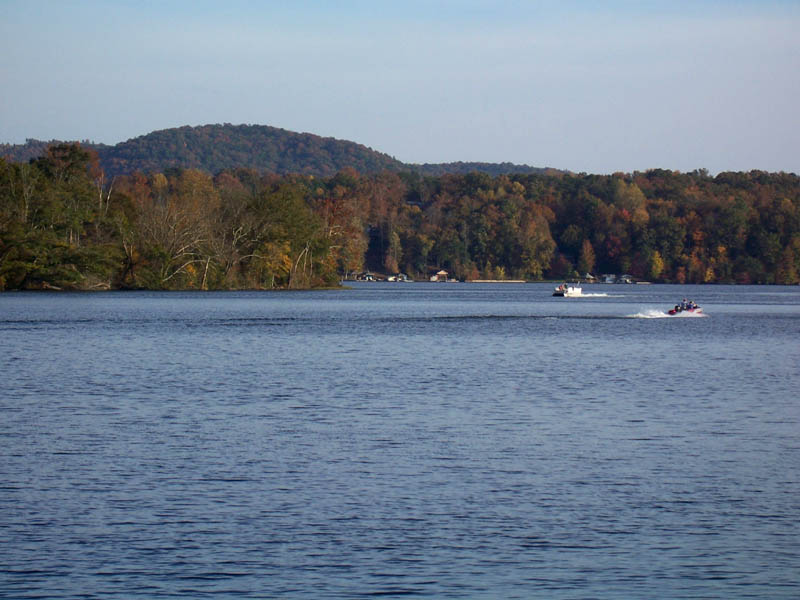
Northern portion of Lake Tillery.

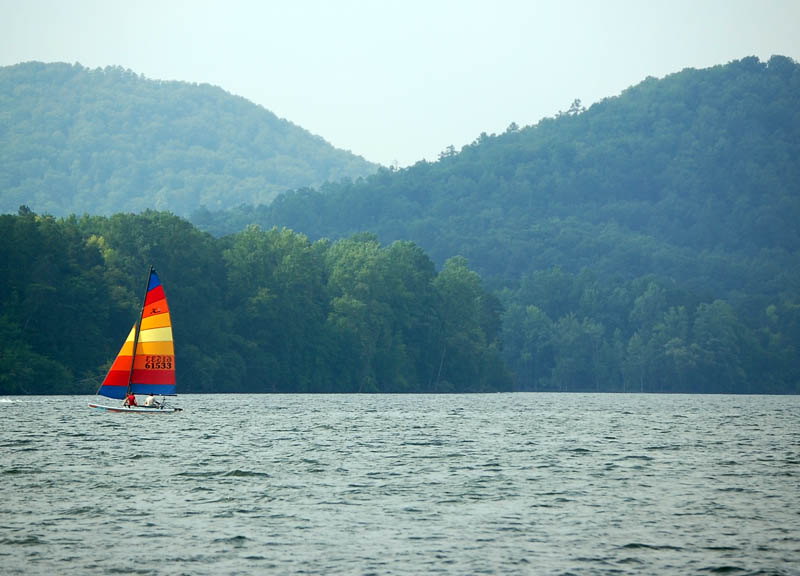
Lake Tillery where Uwharrie River and Yadkin River converge.

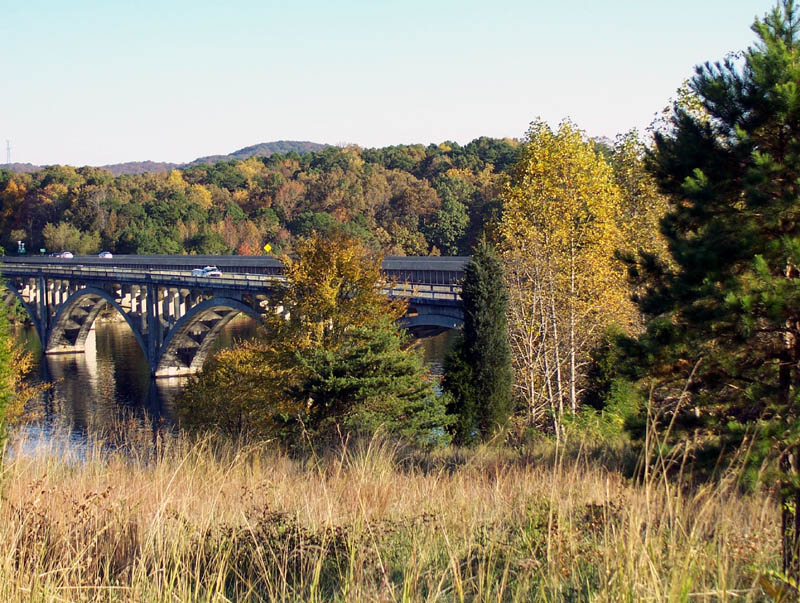
James B. Garrison Bridge over Lake Tillery.
