= Full pond =

Phrase term in American Hydrology

Full pond is an American phrase used to describe the water level of a lake, reservoir or other body of fresh water when the level is just below the spillway, or is otherwise at a maximum, sustainable and safe level.

Technically, a body of water can have a water level higher than full pond when the inflow of water into the body greatly exceeds the outflow (such as during a heavy rain event), even if the body of water is not at full flood level. Most lakes and reservoirs have the ability to lower the level of the lake even when it is already significantly below full. This is used for flood prevention during periods of high (or potentially high) inflow to prevent flooding and to prevent water from breaching containment when it is expected the body of water will soon exceed full pond status.

== See also ==
- High water mark
- Hydroelectric power
