= Uwharrie Mountains =

Mountain range in North Carolina, United States

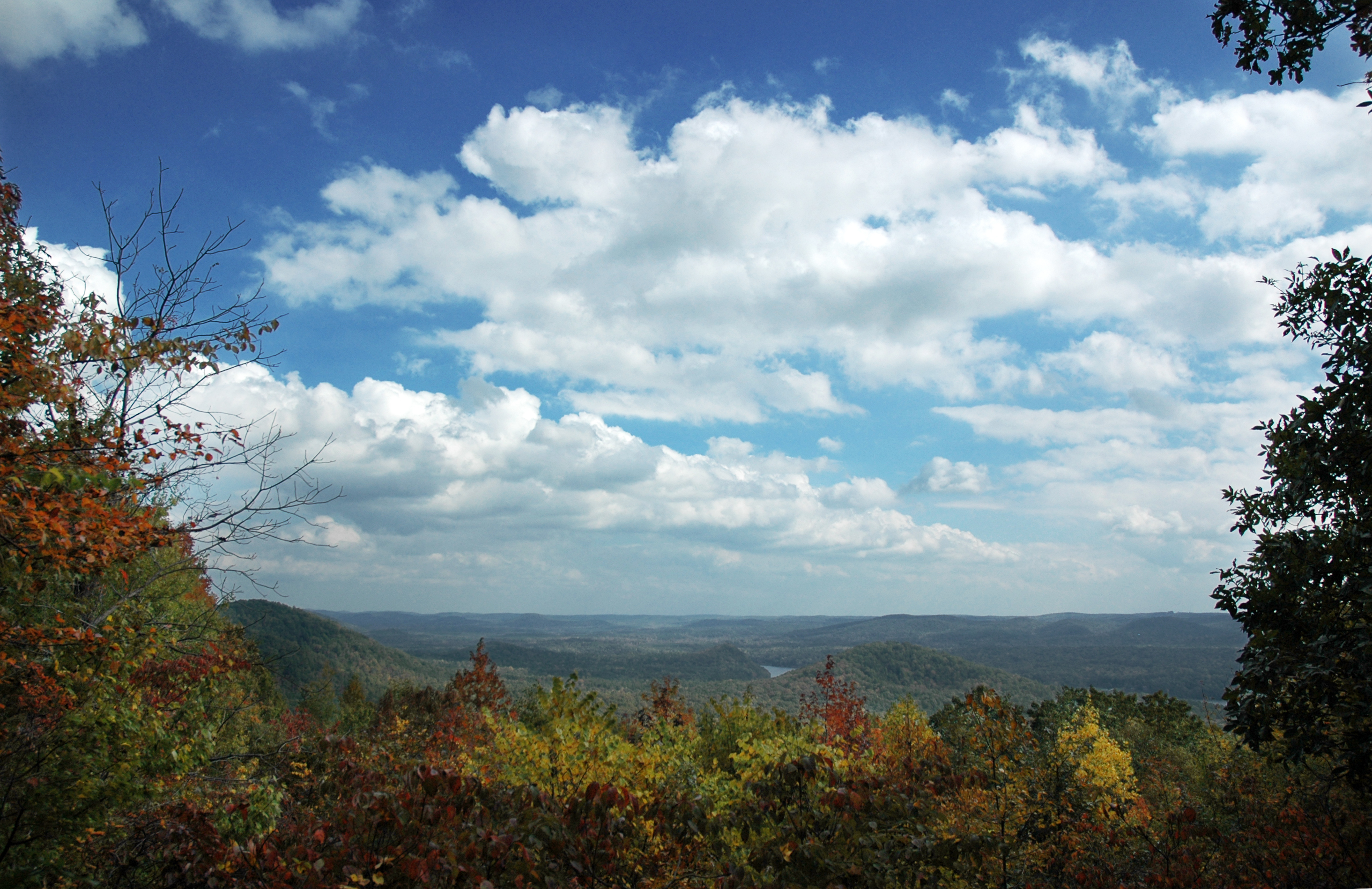
- View over range from Morrow Mountain

Highest point
- Peak: High Rock Mountain
- Elevation: 1,178 ft (359 m)

Geography
- Country: United States
- State: North Carolina
- Range coordinates: 35°24′07″N 80°03′32″W

Geology
- Rock age: ~586-554 million years

The Uwharrie Mountains (/juːˈhwɑːri/) are an ancient mountain range in North Carolina spanning the counties of Randolph, Montgomery, Stanly, and Davidson. The range's foothills stretch into Cabarrus, Anson, Union, and Richmond counties. The Uwharrie Mountains are what remain of an ancient volcanic island arc that formed around 550 million years ago. Today, the range is isolated and heavily eroded, while still offering a vast biodiversity. The mountains hold an engaging history, with discoveries of gold and ancient Native American artifacts.

== Geology ==
=== Origin, age, and scale of eruptions ===
The Uwharrie Mountains are the ancient remains of a Neoproterozoic to early Paleozoic volcanic/sedimentary island arc that is a part of the larger Carolina terrane, a peri-Gondwanan arc microcontinent later accreted to eastern Laurentia (ancestral North America). Within this terrane, the Uwharrie and adjacent ranges expose the Albemarle Group, which includes the Uwharrie, Tillery, and Cid formations, of the Carolina Slate Belt. This area is dominated by felsic metavolcanic rocks, with lesser amounts of meta-intermediate volcanic rocks, and metamorphosed mafic rocks (also known as greenstone and greenschist.).

U–Pb zircon dating places Uwharrie volcanism in the Ediacaran (~570–550 million years ago). Additional research ages felsic flows and tuffs (rhyodacite to rhyolite) in the Uwharrie Formation at around 568 ± 6 and 558 ± 8 million years, with other research dating igneous rocks between ~586 ± 10 and 554 ± 15 million years. These short timeframes show short-lived, highly explosive island arc volcanic system. Within the Uwharrie Mountains, mapped welded tuffs and multi-kilometer-thick metavolcanic successions indicate repeated sub-Plinian to Plinian eruptions, with individual events most likely were VEI ~4–6 in size. However, the exact size is unknown due to erosion, time, and post-volcanic orogenies. (Note: The VEI (Volcanic Explosivity Index) relates eruptive bulk volume and column height to eruption size; these Uwharrie estimates follow standard criteria and are inferred from deposit thickness and lateral extent rather than direct observation.)

=== Post volcanism and accretion ===
Volcanic activity in the Uwharrie Mountains waned by the late Ediacaran to the early Cambrian. The youngest volcanic rocks date to around 554 million years. There is no evidence for volcanic rocks younger than that.

The end of volcanism in the Uwharrie Mountains likely reflects a change in subduction geometry. As the arc reorganized, the local magma source shut down and a new melt zone developed, shifting the active volcanic front away from the Uwharrie belt. Evidence also points to temporary slab flattening event that reduced mantle wedge melting and/or back-arc reorganization.

Following the end volcanism, the Uwharrie Mountain rocks were buried, folded, faulted, and metamorphosed under greenschist conditions, typical of the Carolina Slate Belt as a whole. Just before accretion to Laurentia, volcanism in the Uwharrie Mountains had already shut down; the Albemarle Group was being buried and deformed as convergence tightened, producing pervasive cleavage, large arch-shaped fold belts, and shear zones typical of the Carolina Slate Belt. As the Carolina terrane approached Laurentia, its margins broke into overlapping thrust sheets (land being forced upward) due to the collision. This happened due to the angle of impact between the Carolina Terrane and Laurentia. This event was known as the Middle Ordovician accretion, which happened roughly between 465–440 million years ago.

Accretion of the Carolina terrane to Laurentia is generally placed in the Middle Ordovician (between 465-455 million years ago), with deformation continuing into the Early Silurian as the Iapetus Ocean narrowed (between 440-435 million years ago). The docking event predates the Acadian and Alleghanian orogenies, which were tied to Rheic Ocean closure and final assembly of Pangaea. This event happened at the same time as the Taconic Orogeny, though the two events were not related. During accretion, the terrane broke into overlapping thrust sheets along major shear zones. This forced some of the Carolina Terrane beneath the Laurentian margin while others were thrust up and over it. Later, regional metamorphism and oblique compression tightened and reshaped these stacks into the Slate Belt architecture seen today.

=== Metamorphism, deformation, and burial ===
Well preserved flow bands present on a metarhyodacite rock from Morrow Mountain

Following accretion, the Uwharrie volcanic rocks (rhyolite/rhyodacite lavas and tuffs, plus minor mafic flows) were altered at greenschist conditions (~300–450 °C, low–moderate pressure). Volcanic glass and ash recrystallized to very fine quartz–sericite (mica); feldspar partly changed to albite and sericite; and mafic lavas were replaced by chlorite, actinolite, and epidote. Compression also formed a slaty–phyllitic cleavage that flattened and rotated pumice shards and streaky welded-tuff textures remain locally visible. Many Metarhyodactice rocks in places like Morrow Mountain, still have the original flow banding on them. Vesicles were filled by quartz, epidote, chlorite, or carbonate. Most of this fabric formed (~465–440 million years ago), with minor, local reheating during the Late Paleozoic between (~325–300 million years ago).

=== Exhumation and modern topography ===
The present-day Uwharrie Mountains are erosional remnants (monadnocks) of relatively resistant felsic metavolcanic units standing above the surrounding Piedmont. Since the Mesozoic, differential weathering, river channeling (Yadkin–Pee Dee River and Uwharrie drainages), along with isostatic rebound following the rifting of Pangea and the openning of the Atlantic Ocean, produced the eroded mountains we see today. One of the most popular places to visit, where people can see metarhyodactite rocks is Morrow Mountain State Park.

== History and wildlife ==
=== Biodiversity ===
The Uwharrie lie within the Southeastern mixed forests ecoregion. They give their name to the Uwharrie National Forest. Once entirely cleared for timber and farmland, the mountains were designated a U.S. National Forest in 1961 by President John F. Kennedy. The woodlands have since returned, providing a haven for a diversity of wildlife, recreational facilities, and numerous Native American archeological sites.

The mountains encapsulate a vast biodiversity, housing many species that are considered to be unusual for the area. Types of flora like the montane longleaf pine, the Carolina thistle, and the Schweinitz's sunflower, considered an endangered species since 1991, can be found in the region. The area also houses a unique diversity of wildlife including the Carolina Redhorse, a rare species of fish discovered in 1995, found in the Pee Dee River.

=== History ===
In 1799, the discovery of gold at the nearby Reed Gold Mine in Cabarrus County led to America's first gold rush, where the site now hosts visitors to tours of the old mines and gold panning. Gold can still be found in the Uwharrie Mountains and national forest today. Native Americans also played a large role in the history of the mountains, with occupation being assumed to date back to the Archaic or Paleoindian period. The Hardaway Site, located in Stanly County within the Uwharrie Mountains, is North Carolina's oldest archaeological site where many ancient artifacts were discovered.

== Recreation ==
Within the mountains there are many options for recreational activities, including many trails available for hiking or trail running. Some of the trails found in the region include the Badin Lake Recreation Area Trails, Uwharrie National Recreation Trail, and the Birkhead Mountain Trail. Other recreational activities can be found in the surrounding Uwharrie National Forest, including camping, climbing, hunting, fishing, and gold panning.

== Protected areas ==
- Birkhead Mountains Wilderness
- Morrow Mountain State Park
- Uwharrie National Forest
