= Uwharrie National Forest =

National forest in the U.S. state of North Carolina

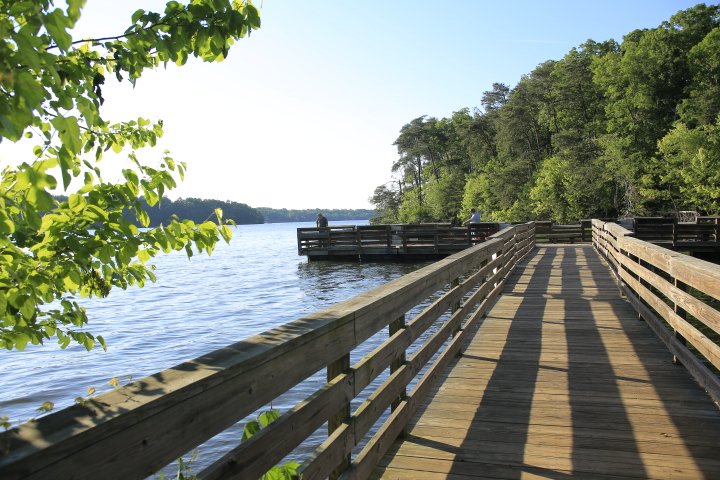
- Fishing pier at Kings Mountain Point Day Use Area

- Location within North Carolina Location within the United States
- Location: North Carolina, United States
- Nearest town: Troy, NC
- Coordinates: 35°26′0″N 80°1′11″W
- Area: 50,645 acres (204.95 km^{2})
- Established: January 12, 1961
- Governing body: U.S. Forest Service
- Website: Uwharrie National Forest

Uwharrie National Forest (locally /juːˈwɑːri/ yoo-WAH-ree) is a federally designated national forest region located primarily in Montgomery County, but also extending into Randolph and Davidson counties in south central North Carolina. It is the smallest of the four National Forests in North Carolina, with a total area of 50,645 acres (204.95 km^{2}). About 79% of its acreage is in Montgomery County. The forest is managed together with the other three North Carolina National Forests (Croatan, Nantahala, and Pisgah) from common headquarters in Asheville, North Carolina. However, it does have a local ranger district office in Troy, North Carolina. There is one officially designated wilderness area within the forest—the 5,025-acre (20.34 km²) Birkhead Mountains Wilderness.

The forest derives its name from the Uwharrie Mountains, the ancient mountains atop which most of the forest sits. The western border of the forest is made by the Yadkin River / Pee Dee River while the northern border follows the northernmost range of the Uwharries near Asheboro. To the east, the forest is bordered by the Montgomery County seat of Troy.

The Forest lies within the Southeastern mixed forests ecoregion and supports mixed forests of pine and oak.

Land was first purchased by the Federal government in 1931, and the area was known as the Uwharrie Reservation. The Uwharrie Forest was given federal designation in the early 1960s by President John F. Kennedy, along with the Nantahala, Pisgah, and Croatan National Forests.

The forest is bisected by several state and interstate highways. Both Interstate 73 and Interstate 74 run along the eastern boundary of the forest on the Moore County line from north to south. NC 73 runs from west to east from the Yadkin River to Mount Gilead. U.S. Highway 220 runs parallel to I-73/74. NC 109 runs from north to south from the Davidson County line to its end in Troy. NC 24/27 both run from the Yadkin River in the west to Moore County in the east.

The forest is one of the key locations used in the US Army Special Warfare School's ROBIN SAGE exercise for the training of Special Forces students.

The first substantial gold strike in the United States was discovered near this area in 1799, and gold was found in the Uwharrie Mountains in the 19th century. A mini gold rush occurred during the Great Depression. Panning for gold in the forest's streams and rivers remains a popular activity. Boating and fishing are available at Badin Lake, while the 20-mile (32.19 km) Uwharrie National Recreation Trail runs through the forest. Other trails and paths provide opportunities for hiking, mountain biking, camping, and horseback riding. Off-road vehicles have their own trail system, which is open seasonally.

Uwharrie National Forest has received attention for unconfirmed sightings of Mountain lions within forest boundaries.

== See also ==
- List of national forests of the United States
