= Moores Fork (Stewarts Creek tributary) =

Stream in North Carolina, USA

Moores Fork Tributary to Stewarts Creek
- Location of Moores Fork mouth Moores Fork (Stewarts Creek tributary) (the United States)

Location
- Country: United States
- State: North Carolina
- County: Surry

Physical characteristics
- Source: Little Fisher River divide
  - location: pond at Crooked Oak, North Carolina
  - coordinates: 36°31′55″N 080°45′20″W
  - elevation: 1,400 ft (430 m)
- Mouth
  - location: about 3 miles west-northwest of Toast, North Carolina
  - coordinates: 36°30′37″N 080°41′12″W
  - elevation: 1,066 ft (325 m)
- Length: 5.36 mi (8.63 km)
- Basin size: 6.35 square miles (16.4 km^{2})
- Discharge
  - location: Stewarts Creek
  - average: 9.59 cu ft/s (0.272 m^{3}/s) at mouth with Stewarts Creek

Basin features
- Progression: Stewarts Creek → Ararat River → Yadkin River → Pee Dee River → Winyah Bay → Atlantic Ocean
- River system: Yadkin River
- Tributaries
  - left: unnamed tributaries
  - right: unnamed tributaries
- Bridges: I-74, Locust Lane, Kitty Hawk Lane, Maple Grove Church Road, Race Track Road

Moores Fork is a 5.36 mi (8.63 km) long 3rd order tributary to Stewarts Creek in Surry County, North Carolina.

== Variant names ==
According to the Geographic Names Information System, it has also been known historically as:

- McAfee Creek

== Course ==
Moores Fork rises in a pond at Crooked Oak, North Carolina and then flows south and east to join Stewarts Creek about 3 miles west-northwest of Toast, North Carolina.

== Watershed ==
Moores Fork drains 6.35 square miles (16.4 km^{2}) of area, receives about 47.8 in/year of precipitation, has a wetness index of 344.94, and is about 42% forested.

== See also ==
- List of Rivers of North Carolina
