= Davenport Creek (Fisher River tributary) =

Stream in North Carolina, USA

Davenport Creek Tributary to Fisher River
- Location of Davenport Creek mouth Davenport Creek (Fisher River tributary) (the United States)

Location
- Country: United States
- State: North Carolina
- County: Surry

Physical characteristics
- Source: Dunagan Creek divide
  - location: about 1.5 miles south of Stony Knoll, North Carolina
  - coordinates: 36°17′29″N 080°40′28″W
  - elevation: 1,058 ft (322 m)
- Mouth: Fisher River
  - location: about 1.5 miles east-northeast of Crutchfield, North Carolina
  - coordinates: 36°16′27″N 080°41′37″W
  - elevation: 838 ft (255 m)
- Length: 1.95 mi (3.14 km)
- Basin size: 1.17 square miles (3.0 km^{2})
- Discharge
  - location: Fisher River
  - average: 1.76 cu ft/s (0.050 m^{3}/s) at mouth with Fisher River

Basin features
- Progression: Fisher River → Yadkin River → Pee Dee River → Winyah Bay → Atlantic Ocean
- River system: Yadkin River
- Tributaries
  - left: unnamed tributaries
  - right: unnamed tributaries
- Bridges: Buck Fork Road

Davenport Creek is a 1.95 mi (3.14 km) long 1st order tributary to the Fisher River in Surry County, North Carolina.

== Course ==
Davenport Creek rises about 1.5 miles south of Stony Knoll, North Carolina. Davenport Creek then flows southwest to join the Fisher River about 1.5 miles east-northeast of Crutchfield, North Carolina.

== Watershed ==
Davenport Creek drains 1.17 square miles (3.0 km^{2}) of area, receives about 47.8 in/year of precipitation, has a wetness index of 345.68, and is about 44% forested.

== See also ==
- List of rivers of North Carolina
