= Huntington Branch =

Stream in North Carolina, US

Huntington Branch Tributary to Stony Creek
- Location of Huntington Branch mouth Huntington Branch (the United States)

Location
- Country: United States
- State: North Carolina; Virginia
- County: Surry; Carroll

Physical characteristics
- Source: Naked Run divide
  - location: about 1 mile southeast of Lambsburg, Virginia
  - coordinates: 36°34′17″N 080°44′18″W
  - elevation: 1,420 ft (430 m)
- Mouth
  - location: about 4 miles southeast of Crooked Oak, North Carolina
  - coordinates: 36°33′07″N 080°42′45″W
  - elevation: 1,194 ft (364 m)
- Length: 2.01 mi (3.23 km)
- Basin size: 0.97 square miles (2.5 km^{2})
- Discharge
  - location: Stony Creek
  - average: 1.62 cu ft/s (0.046 m^{3}/s) at mouth with Stony Creek

Basin features
- Progression: Stony Creek → Stewarts Creek → Ararat River → Yadkin River → Pee Dee River → Winyah Bay → Atlantic Ocean
- River system: Yadkin River
- Tributaries
  - left: unnamed tributaries
  - right: unnamed tributaries
- Bridges: Walker Drive

Huntington Branch is a 2.01 mi (3.23 km) long 1st order tributary to Stony Creek in Surry County, North Carolina.

== Course ==
Huntington Branch rises about 1 mile southeast of Lambsburg, Virginia, in Carroll County and then flows southeast into North Carolina to join Stony Creek about 4 miles northeast of Crooked Oak, North Carolina.

== Watershed ==
Huntington Branch drains 0.97 square miles (2.5 km^{2}) of area, receives about 48.4 in/year of precipitation, has a wetness index of 344.91, and is about 54% forested.

== See also ==
- List of Rivers of North Carolina
- List of Rivers of Virginia
