= Naked Run =

Stream in North Carolina, USA

Naked Run Tributary to Stewarts Creek
- Location of Naked Run mouth Naked Run (the United States)

Location
- Country: United States
- State: North Carolina
- County: Surry; Carroll

Physical characteristics
- Source: unnamed tributary to Stewarts Creek divide
  - location: about 0.5 miles east of Lambsburg, Virginia
  - coordinates: 36°35′01″N 080°44′45″W
  - elevation: 1,680 ft (510 m)
- Mouth
  - location: about 1.5 miles east of Crooked Oak, North Carolina
  - coordinates: 36°32′21″N 080°43′14″W
  - elevation: 1,148 ft (350 m)
- Length: 3.96 mi (6.37 km)
- Basin size: 2.54 square miles (6.6 km^{2})
- Discharge
  - location: Stewarts Creek
  - average: 4.13 cu ft/s (0.117 m^{3}/s) at mouth with Stewarts Creek

Basin features
- Progression: Stewarts Creek → Ararat River → Yadkin River → Pee Dee River → Winyah Bay → Atlantic Ocean
- River system: Yadkin River
- Tributaries
  - left: unnamed tributaries
  - right: unnamed tributaries
- Bridges: Lambsburg Road, McCraw Road, I-74, W Imogene Road Church Road

Naked Run is a 3.96 mi (6.37 km) long 1st order tributary to Stewarts Creek in Surry County, North Carolina.

== Course ==
Naked Run rises about 0.5 miles east of Lambsburg, Virginia in Carroll County and then flows southeast into North Carolina to join Stewarts Creek about 1.5 miles east of Crooked Oak, North Carolina.

== Watershed ==
Naked Run drains 2.54 square miles (6.6 km^{2}) of area, receives about 48.6 in/year of precipitation, has a wetness index of 331.47, and is about 65% forested.

== See also ==
- List of Rivers of North Carolina
- List of Rivers of Virginia
