= Pheasant Creek (Fisher River tributary) =

Stream in North Carolina, USA

Pheasant Creek Tributary to Fisher River
- Location of Pheasant Creek mouth Pheasant Creek (Fisher River tributary) (the United States)

Location
- Country: United States
- State: North Carolina
- County: Surry

Physical characteristics
- Source: Snow Creek divide
  - location: about 1 mile northeast of Little Richmond, North Carolina
  - coordinates: 36°18′37″N 080°44′32″W
  - elevation: 1,080 ft (330 m)
- Mouth: Fisher River
  - location: about 1 mile northeast of Crutchfield, North Carolina
  - coordinates: 36°16′51″N 080°41′54″W
  - elevation: 855 ft (261 m)
- Length: 3.91 mi (6.29 km)
- Basin size: 2.98 square miles (7.7 km^{2})
- Discharge
  - location: Fisher River
  - average: 4.49 cu ft/s (0.127 m^{3}/s) at mouth with Fisher River

Basin features
- Progression: Fisher River → Yadkin River → Pee Dee River → Winyah Bay → Atlantic Ocean
- River system: Yadkin River
- Tributaries
  - left: unnamed tributaries
  - right: unnamed tributaries
- Bridges: Gilliam Road, Still Water Lane, US 601, Chandler Road

Pheasant Creek is a 3.91 mi (6.29 km) long 1st order tributary to the Fisher River in Surry County, North Carolina.

== Course ==
Pheasant Creek rises about 1 mile northeast of Little Richmond, North Carolina. Pheasant Creek then flows southeast to join the Fisher River about 1 mile northeast of Crutchfield, North Carolina.

== Watershed ==
Pheasant Creek drains 2.98 square miles (7.7 km^{2}) of area, receives about 48.5 in/year of precipitation, has a wetness index of 375.98, and is about 45% forested.

== See also ==
- List of rivers of North Carolina
