= Flat Branch (Fisher River tributary) =

Stream in North Carolina, USA

Flat Branch Tributary to Fisher River
- Location of Flat Branch mouth Flat Branch (Fisher River tributary) (the United States)

Location
- Country: United States
- State: North Carolina
- County: Surry

Physical characteristics
- Source: Red Hill Creek and Mitchell River divides
  - location: about 2 miles southwest of Blevins Store, North Carolina
  - coordinates: 36°26′07″N 080°50′30″W
  - elevation: 1,360 ft (410 m)
- Mouth: Fisher River
  - location: about 2 miles southeast of Blevins Store, North Carolina
  - coordinates: 36°26′05″N 080°48′03″W
  - elevation: 1,118 ft (341 m)
- Length: 2.92 mi (4.70 km)
- Basin size: 2.52 square miles (6.5 km^{2})
- Discharge
  - location: Fisher River
  - average: 4.17 cu ft/s (0.118 m^{3}/s) at mouth with Fisher River

Basin features
- Progression: Fisher River → Yadkin River → Pee Dee River → Winyah Bay → Atlantic Ocean
- River system: Yadkin River
- Tributaries
  - left: unnamed tributaries
  - right: unnamed tributaries
- Bridges: Red Hill Creek Road, W Rocky Lane, Fisher Valley Road

Flat Branch is a 2.92 mi (4.70 km) long 2nd order tributary to the Fisher River in Surry County, North Carolina.

== Course ==
Flat Branch rises on the Red Hill Creek and Mitchell River divides about 2 miles southwest of Blevins Store, North Carolina. Flat Branch then flows generally east to join the Fisher River about 2 miles southeast of Blevins Store.

== Watershed ==
Flat Branch drains 2.52 square miles (6.5 km^{2}) of area, receives about 49.2 in/year of precipitation, has a wetness index of 340.91, and is about 63% forested.

== See also ==
- List of rivers of North Carolina
