= Bear Creek (Fisher River tributary) =

Stream in North Carolina, USA

Bear Creek Tributary to Fisher River
- Location of Bear Creek mouth Bear Creek (Fisher River tributary) (the United States)

Location
- Country: United States
- State: North Carolina
- County: Surry

Physical characteristics
- Source: Snow Creek divide
  - location: pond about 2 miles north-northeast of Little Richmond, North Carolina
  - coordinates: 36°19′09″N 080°44′29″W
  - elevation: 1,130 ft (340 m)
- Mouth: Fisher River
  - location: about 1 mile southwest of Stony Knoll, North Carolina
  - coordinates: 36°18′26″N 080°41′49″W
  - elevation: 890 ft (270 m)
- Length: 3.36 mi (5.41 km)
- Basin size: 3.08 square miles (8.0 km^{2})
- Discharge
  - location: Fisher River
  - average: 4.68 cu ft/s (0.133 m^{3}/s) at mouth with Fisher River

Basin features
- Progression: Fisher River → Yadkin River → Pee Dee River → Winyah Bay → Atlantic Ocean
- River system: Yadkin River
- Tributaries
  - left: unnamed tributaries
  - right: unnamed tributaries
- Bridges: US 601

Bear Creek is a 3.36 mi (5.41 km) long 2nd order tributary to the Fisher River in Surry County, North Carolina.

== Course ==
Bear Creek rises in a pond about 2 north-northeast of Little Richmond, North Carolina. Bear Creek then flows southeast to join the Fisher River about 1 mile southwest of Stony Knoll.

== Watershed ==
Bear Creek drains 3.08 square miles (8.0 km^{2}) of area, receives about 48.5 in/year of precipitation, has a wetness index of 361.72, and is about 43% forested.

== See also ==
- List of rivers of North Carolina
