= Benson Creek (Stewarts Creek tributary) =

Stream in North Carolina, USA

Benson Creek Tributary to Stewarts Creek
- Location of Benson Creek mouth Benson Creek (Stewarts Creek tributary) (the United States)

Location
- Country: United States
- State: North Carolina
- County: Surry

Physical characteristics
- Source: Pauls Creek divide
  - location: pond about 4 miles east-northeast of Crooked Oak, North Carolina
  - coordinates: 36°32′50″N 080°42′08″W
  - elevation: 1,330 ft (410 m)
- Mouth
  - location: about 2 miles west-northwest of Toast, North Carolina
  - coordinates: 36°30′37″N 080°40′34″W
  - elevation: 1,053 ft (321 m)
- Length: 3.11 mi (5.01 km)
- Basin size: 2.24 square miles (5.8 km^{2})
- Discharge
  - location: Stewarts Creek
  - average: 3.48 cu ft/s (0.099 m^{3}/s) at mouth with Stewarts Creek

Basin features
- Progression: Stewarts Creek → Ararat River → Yadkin River → Pee Dee River → Winyah Bay → Atlantic Ocean
- River system: Yadkin River
- Tributaries
  - left: unnamed tributaries
  - right: unnamed tributaries
- Bridges: Sparger Road

Benson Creek is a 3.11 mi (5.01 km) long 1st order tributary to Stewarts Creek in Surry County, North Carolina.

== Variant names ==
According to the Geographic Names Information System, it has also been known historically as:

- Dinfield Creek

== Course ==
Benson Creek rises in a pond about 4 miles east-northeast of Crooked Oak, North Carolina and then flows southeast to join Stewarts Creek about 2 miles west-northwest of Toast, North Carolina.

== Watershed ==
Benson Creek drains 2.24 square miles (5.8 km^{2}) of area, receives about 47.8 in/year of precipitation, has a wetness index of 324.48, and is about 57% forested.

== See also ==
- List of Rivers of North Carolina
