= Little Beaver Creek (Fisher River tributary) =

Stream in North Carolina, USA

Little Beaver Creek Tributary to Fisher River
- Location of Little Beaver Creek mouth Little Beaver Creek (Fisher River tributary) (the United States)

Location
- Country: United States
- State: North Carolina
- County: Surry

Physical characteristics
- Source: Beaver Creek divide
  - location: about 1.5 miles north of Level Cross, North Carolina
  - coordinates: 36°21′52″N 080°38′04″W
  - elevation: 1,140 ft (350 m)
- Mouth: Fisher River
  - location: about 2 miles northeast of Fairview, North Carolina
  - coordinates: 36°20′19″N 080°41′01″W
  - elevation: 918 ft (280 m)
- Length: 4.16 mi (6.69 km)
- Basin size: 3.88 square miles (10.0 km^{2})
- Discharge
  - location: Fisher River
  - average: 5.77 cu ft/s (0.163 m^{3}/s) at mouth with Fisher River

Basin features
- Progression: Fisher River → Yadkin River → Pee Dee River → Winyah Bay → Atlantic Ocean
- River system: Yadkin River
- Tributaries
  - left: unnamed tributaries
  - right: unnamed tributaries
- Bridges: Pratt Road, Copeland School Road, Simpson Mill Road, NC 268

Little Beaver Creek is a 4.16 mi (6.69 km) long 2nd order tributary to the Fisher River in Surry County, North Carolina.

== Course ==
Little Beaver Creek rises about 1.5 miles north of Level Cross, North Carolina. Little Beaver Creek then flows southwest to join the Fisher River about 2 miles northeast of Fairview, North Carolina.

== Watershed ==
Little Beaver Creek drains 3.88 square miles (10.0 km^{2}) of area, receives about 48.1 in/year of precipitation, has a wetness index of 398.06, and is about 26% forested.

== See also ==
- List of rivers of North Carolina
