= Beech Creek (Stewarts Creek tributary) =

Stream in North Carolina, USA

Beech Creek Tributary to Stewarts Creek
- Location of Beech Creek mouth Beech Creek (Stewarts Creek tributary) (the United States)

Location
- Country: United States
- State: North Carolina
- County: Surry
- City: Mount Airy

Physical characteristics
- Source: Cooks Creek divide
  - location: pond about 0.25 miles north of Red Brush, North Carolina
  - coordinates: 36°28′51″N 080°41′42″W
  - elevation: 1,320 ft (400 m)
- Mouth
  - location: Mount Airy, North Carolina
  - coordinates: 36°28′23″N 080°38′22″W
  - elevation: 1,000 ft (300 m)
- Length: 4.22 mi (6.79 km)
- Basin size: 3.07 square miles (8.0 km^{2})
- Discharge
  - location: Stewarts Creek
  - average: 4.63 cu ft/s (0.131 m^{3}/s) at mouth with Stewarts Creek

Basin features
- Progression: Stewarts Creek → Ararat River → Yadkin River → Pee Dee River → Winyah Bay → Atlantic Ocean
- River system: Yadkin River
- Tributaries
  - left: unnamed tributaries
  - right: unnamed tributaries
- Bridges: Blackthorn Lane, Beechnut Lane, George Chandler Road, W Old McKinney Road, McKinney Road, Piedmont Triad West Road

Beech Creek is a 4.22 mi (6.79 km) long 2nd order tributary to Stewarts Creek in Surry County, North Carolina.

== Variant names ==
According to the Geographic Names Information System, it has also been known historically as:

- Beach Creek

== Course ==
Beech Creek rises in a pond about 0.25 miles south of Red Brush, North Carolina, in Surry County and then flows east-southeast to join Stewarts Creek on the west side of Mount Airy, North Carolina.

== Watershed ==
Beech Creek drains 3.07 square miles (8.0 km^{2}) of area, receives about 47.5 in/year of precipitation, has a wetness index of 366.84, and is about 28% forested.

== See also ==
- List of Rivers of North Carolina
