= Flat Creek (Stewarts Creek tributary) =

Stream in Virginia, USA

Flat Creek Tributary to Stewarts Creek
- Location of Flat Creek mouth Flat Creek (Stewarts Creek tributary) (the United States)

Location
- Country: United States
- State: Virginia
- County: Carroll

Physical characteristics
- Source: unnamed tributary to Little Fisher River divide
  - location: about 0.5 miles west of Sams Knob
  - coordinates: 36°34′53″N 080°48′33″W
  - elevation: 2,860 ft (870 m)
- Mouth
  - location: about 0.25 miles southwest of Lambsburg, Virginia
  - coordinates: 36°34′54″N 080°46′01″W
  - elevation: 1,424 ft (434 m)
- Length: 2.37 mi (3.81 km)
- Basin size: 0.85 square miles (2.2 km^{2})
- Discharge
  - location: Stewarts Creek
  - average: 1.95 cu ft/s (0.055 m^{3}/s) at mouth with Stewarts Creek

Basin features
- Progression: Stewarts Creek → Ararat River → Yadkin River → Pee Dee River → Winyah Bay → Atlantic Ocean
- River system: Yadkin River
- Tributaries
  - left: unnamed tributaries
  - right: unnamed tributaries
- Bridges: Mountain Valley Road, Parkwood Road, Chestnut Grove Road

Flat Creek is a 2.37 mi (3.81 km) long 1st order tributary to Stewarts Creek in Carroll County, Virginia, United States.

== Course ==
Flat Creek rises about 0.5 miles (0.80 km) west of Sams Knob in Carroll County and then flows east to join Stewarts Creek about 0.25 miles (0.40 km) southwest of Lambsburg, Virginia.

== Watershed ==
Flat Creek drains 0.87 square miles (2.3 km^{2}) of area, receives about 52.9 in/year of precipitation, has a wetness index of 283.63, and is about 84% forested.

== See also ==
- List of rivers of Virginia
