= Stony Creek (Stewarts Creek tributary) =

Stream in North Carolina, USA

Stony Creek Tributary to Stewarts Creek
- Location of Stony Creek mouth Stony Creek (Stewarts Creek tributary) (the United States)

Location
- Country: United States
- State: North Carolina
- County: Surry; Carroll

Physical characteristics
- Source: unnamed tributary to Stewarts Creek divide
  - location: 0.5 miles northeast of Lambsburg, Virginia
  - coordinates: 36°35′17″N 080°44′29″W
  - elevation: 1,640 ft (500 m)
- Mouth
  - location: about 2 miles east of Crooked Oak, North Carolina
  - coordinates: 36°32′20″N 080°47′03″W
  - elevation: 1,135 ft (346 m)
- Length: 4.50 mi (7.24 km)
- Basin size: 3.74 square miles (9.7 km^{2})
- Discharge
  - location: Stewarts Creek
  - average: 5.99 cu ft/s (0.170 m^{3}/s) at mouth with Stewarts Creek

Basin features
- Progression: Stewarts Creek → Ararat River → Yadkin River → Pee Dee River → Winyah Bay → Atlantic Ocean
- River system: Yadkin River
- Tributaries
  - left: unnamed tributaries
  - right: Huntington Branch
- Bridges: Beauty Shop Road, Old Pipers Gap Road, Imogene Church Road

Stony Creek is a 4.50 mi (7.24 km) long 2nd order tributary to Stewarts Creek in Surry County, North Carolina.

== Variant names ==
According to the Geographic Names Information System, it has also been known historically as:

- Goins Creek

== Course ==
Stony Creek rises about 0.5 miles northeast of Lambsburg, Virginia in Carroll County and then flows southeast into North Carolina and then southwest to join Stewarts Creek about 2 miles east of Crooked Oak, North Carolina.

== Watershed ==
Stony Creek drains 3.74 square miles (9.7 km^{2}) of area, receives about 48.6 in/year of precipitation, has a wetness index of 342.16, and is about 59% forested.

== See also ==
- List of Rivers of North Carolina
- List of Rivers of Virginia
