= Turkey Creek (Stewarts Creek tributary) =

Stream in Virginia, USA

Turkey Creek Tributary to Stewarts Creek
- Location of Turkey Creek mouth Turkey Creek (Stewarts Creek tributary) (the United States)

Location
- Country: United States
- State: Virginia
- County: Carroll

Physical characteristics
- Source: Crooked Creek divide
  - location: about 0.5 miles south of Pipers Gap, Virginia
  - coordinates: 36°37′16″N 080°45′45″W
  - elevation: 2,600 ft (790 m)
- Mouth
  - location: about 0.25 miles west of Lambsburg, Virginia
  - coordinates: 36°34′59″N 080°46′09″W
  - elevation: 1,440 ft (440 m)
- Length: 2.91 mi (4.68 km)
- Basin size: 1.39 square miles (3.6 km^{2})
- Discharge
  - location: Stewarts Creek
  - average: 3.11 cu ft/s (0.088 m^{3}/s) at mouth with Stewarts Creek

Basin features
- Progression: Stewarts Creek → Ararat River → Yadkin River → Pee Dee River → Winyah Bay → Atlantic Ocean
- River system: Yadkin River
- Tributaries
  - left: unnamed tributaries
  - right: unnamed tributaries
- Bridges: Blue Ridge School Road, Lambsburg Road

Turkey Creek is a 2.91 mi (4.68 km) long 1st order tributary to Stewarts Creek in Carroll County, Virginia.

== Course ==
Turkey Creek rises about 0.5 miles south of Pipers Gap in Carroll County and then flows generally south to join Stewarts Creek about 0.25 miles west of Lambsburg, Virginia.

== Watershed ==
Turkey Creek drains 1.39 square miles (3.6 km^{2}) of area, receives about 53.4 in/year of precipitation, has a wetness index of 266.95, and is about 87% forested.

== See also ==
- List of Rivers of Virginia
