= Cooks Creek (Fisher River tributary) =

Stream in North Carolina, USA

Cooks Creek Tributary to Fisher River
- Location of Cooks Creek mouth Cooks Creek (Fisher River tributary) (the United States)

Location
- Country: United States
- State: North Carolina
- County: Surry

Physical characteristics
- Source: Stewarts Creek divide
  - location: pond about 0.5 miles northwest of Red Brush, North Carolina
  - coordinates: 36°28′51″N 080°42′10″W
  - elevation: 1,310 ft (400 m)
- Mouth: Fisher River
  - location: about 1 mile northeast of New Hope, North Carolina
  - coordinates: 36°25′21″N 080°41′41″W
  - elevation: 1,005 ft (306 m)
- Length: 4.87 mi (7.84 km)
- Basin size: 8.17 square miles (21.2 km^{2})
- Discharge
  - location: Fisher River
  - average: 11.99 cu ft/s (0.340 m^{3}/s) at mouth with Fisher River

Basin features
- Progression: Fisher River → Yadkin River → Pee Dee River → Winyah Bay → Atlantic Ocean
- River system: Yadkin River
- Tributaries
  - left: Jackson Creek
  - right: unnamed tributaries
- Bridges: I-74, Saddle Estates Lane, Red Brush Road, Rosebush Trail, White Buffalo Road

Cooks Creek is a 4.87 mi (7.84 km) long 3rd order tributary of Fisher River in Surry County, North Carolina, United States.

== Course ==
Cooks Creek rises in a pond about 0.5 miles northwest of Red Brush, North Carolina. Cooks Creek then flows south to join Fisher River about 1 mile north of New Hope, North Carolina.

== Watershed ==
Cooks Creek drains 8.17 square miles (21.2 km^{2}) of area, receives about 47.8 in/year of precipitation, has a wetness index of 349.66, and is about 39% forested.

== See also ==
- List of rivers of North Carolina
