= Roaring Fork (Fisher River tributary) =

Stream in North Carolina, USA

Roaring Fork Tributary to Fisher River
- Location of Roaring Fork mouth Roaring Fork (Fisher River tributary) (the United States)

Location
- Country: United States
- State: North Carolina
- County: Surry; Alleghany

Physical characteristics
- Source: Ramey Creek divide
  - location: about 2 miles south-southwest of High Point Spur
  - coordinates: 36°31′17″N 080°55′32″W
  - elevation: 2,730 ft (830 m)
- Mouth: Fisher River
  - location: about 1 mile south of Lowgap, North Carolina
  - coordinates: 36°30′17″N 080°51′20″W
  - elevation: 1,258 ft (383 m)
- Length: 5.84 mi (9.40 km)
- Basin size: 13.09 square miles (33.9 km^{2})
- Discharge
  - location: Fisher River
  - average: 21.99 cu ft/s (0.623 m^{3}/s) at mouth with Fisher River

Basin features
- Progression: Fisher River → Yadkin River → Pee Dee River → Winyah Bay → Atlantic Ocean
- River system: Yadkin River
- Tributaries
  - left: unnamed tributaries
  - right: Ramey Creek
- Bridges: Fishers Peak View, Carson Creek Road (x2), Ramey Creek Road (x2), Warrior Mountain Lane

Roaring Fork is a 5.84 mi (9.40 km) long 3rd order tributary to the Fisher River in Surry County, North Carolina.

== Course ==
Roaring Fork rises on the divide of Ramey Creek about 2 miles south-southwest of High point Spur. Roaring Fork then flows generally southeast to join the Fisher River about 1 mile south of Lowgap, North Carolina.

== Watershed ==
Roaring Fork drains 13.09 square miles (33.9 km^{2}) of area, receives about 48.5 in/year of precipitation, has a wetness index of 272.01, and is about 74% forested.

== See also ==
- List of rivers of North Carolina
