= Sage Creek (Fisher River tributary) =

Stream in North Carolina, USA

Sage Creek Tributary to Fisher River
- Location of Sage Creek mouth Sage Creek (Fisher River tributary) (the United States)

Location
- Country: United States
- State: North Carolina
- County: Surry

Physical characteristics
- Source: divide of unnamed tributary to Fisher River
  - location: about 1.5 miles west of Buck Mountain
  - coordinates: 36°30′24″N 080°49′13″W
  - elevation: 1,480 ft (450 m)
- Mouth: Fisher River
  - location: about 0.5 miles southeast of Ladonia, North Carolina
  - coordinates: 36°28′37″N 080°49′46″W
  - elevation: 1,198 ft (365 m)
- Length: 1.86 mi (2.99 km)
- Basin size: 2.18 square miles (5.6 km^{2})
- Discharge
  - location: Fisher River
  - average: 3.51 cu ft/s (0.099 m^{3}/s) at mouth with Fisher River

Basin features
- Progression: Fisher River → Yadkin River → Pee Dee River → Winyah Bay → Atlantic Ocean
- River system: Yadkin River
- Tributaries
  - left: unnamed tributaries
  - right: unnamed tributaries
- Bridges: W Pine Street, Ladonia Church Road, Sage Creek Trail

Sage Creek is a 4.05 mi (6.52 km) long 2nd order tributary to the Fisher River in Surry County, North Carolina.

== Course ==
Sage Creek rises on the divide of an unnamed tributary to the Fisher River about 1.5 miles west of Buck Mountain. Sage Creek then flows southwest to join the Fisher River about 0.5 miles southeast of Ladonia, North Carolina.

== Watershed ==
Sage Creek drains 2.18 square miles (5.6 km^{2}) of area, receives about 48.1 in/year of precipitation, has a wetness index of 250.61, and is about 66% forested.

== See also ==
- List of rivers of North Carolina
