= North Fork Stewarts Creek =

Stream in Virginia, USA

North Fork Stewarts Creek Tributary to Stewarts Creek
- Location of North Fork Stewarts Creek mouth North Fork Stewarts Creek (the United States)

Location
- Country: United States
- State: Virginia
- County: Carroll

Physical characteristics
- Source: Coal Creek divide
  - location: about 0.25 miles south of Felt Knob
  - coordinates: 36°37′14″N 080°49′27″W
  - elevation: 2,940 ft (900 m)
- Mouth
  - location: about 2 miles northwest of Lambsburg, Virginia
  - coordinates: 36°35′50″N 080°47′12″W
  - elevation: 1,683 ft (513 m)
- Length: 2.92 mi (4.70 km)
- Basin size: 1.28 square miles (3.3 km^{2})
- Discharge
  - location: Stewarts Creek
  - average: 3.04 cu ft/s (0.086 m^{3}/s) at mouth with Stewarts Creek

Basin features
- Progression: Stewarts Creek → Ararat River → Yadkin River → Pee Dee River → Winyah Bay → Atlantic Ocean
- River system: Yadkin River
- Tributaries
  - left: unnamed tributaries
  - right: unnamed tributaries
- Bridges: Blue Ridge Parkway

North Fork Stewarts Creek is a 2.92 mi (4.70 km) long 1st order tributary to Stewarts Creek in Carroll County, Virginia. This stream. along with South Fork Stewarts Creek, forms Stewarts Creek.

== Course ==
North Fork Stewarts Creek rises about 0.25 miles south of Felt Knob in Carroll County and then flows generally southeast to join Stewarts Creek about 2 miles northwest of Lambsburg, Virginia.

== Watershed ==
North Fork Stewarts Creek drains 1.28 square miles (3.3 km^{2}) of area, receives about 53.5 in/year of precipitation, has a wetness index of 282.42, and is about 62% forested.

== See also ==
- List of Rivers of Virginia
