= Camp Branch (Fisher River tributary) =

Stream in North Carolina, US

Camp Branch Tributary to Fisher River
- Location of Camp Branch mouth Camp Branch (Fisher River tributary) (the United States)

Location
- Country: United States
- State: North Carolina
- County: Surry

Physical characteristics
- Source: south side of Blue Ridge Mountain Escarpment
  - location: about 1.5 miles southwest of Fisher Peak
  - coordinates: 36°31′52″N 080°49′38″W
  - elevation: 2,460 ft (750 m)
- Mouth: Fisher River
  - location: about 2 miles southeast of Lowgap, North Carolina
  - coordinates: 36°30′06″N 080°50′56″W
  - elevation: 1,250 ft (380 m)
- Length: 4.05 mi (6.52 km)
- Basin size: 4.29 square miles (11.1 km^{2})
- Discharge
  - location: Fisher River
  - average: 6.65 cu ft/s (0.188 m^{3}/s) at mouth with Fisher River

Basin features
- Progression: Fisher River → Yadkin River → Pee Dee River → Winyah Bay → Atlantic Ocean
- River system: Yadkin River
- Tributaries
  - left: unnamed tributaries
  - right: unnamed tributaries
- Bridges: Bear Trail, Creeks Edge Lane (x2), Old Lowgap Road, Vander Trail, W Pine Street, Hidden Valley Road

Camp Branch is a 4.05 mi (6.52 km) long 2nd-order tributary to the Fisher River in Surry County, North Carolina.

== Course ==
Camp Branch rises on the Blue Ridge Mountain escarpment about 1.5 miles southwest of Fisher Peak. Camp Branch then flows southwest to join the Fisher River about 2 miles southeast of Lowgap, North Carolina.

== Watershed ==
Camp Branch drains 4.29 square miles (11.1 km^{2}) of area, receives about 47.8 in/year of precipitation, has a wetness index of 277.75, and is about 85% forested.

== See also ==
- List of rivers of North Carolina
