= Gully Creek (Fisher River tributary) =

Stream in North Carolina, USA

Gully Creek Tributary to Fisher River
- Location of Gully Creek mouth Gully Creek (Fisher River tributary) (the United States)

Location
- Country: United States
- State: North Carolina; Virginia
- County: Surry (NC); Grayson (VA)

Physical characteristics
- Source: West Fork Chestnut Creek divide
  - location: spring 0.5 miles south of Low Gap, Virginia
  - coordinates: 36°33′42″N 080°53′54″W
  - elevation: 2,492 ft (760 m)
- Mouth: Fisher River
  - location: about 0.25 miles north of Lowgap, North Carolina
  - coordinates: 36°31′55″N 080°51′57″W
  - elevation: 1.358 ft (0.414 m)
- Length: 3.24 mi (5.21 km)
- Basin size: 2.37 square miles (6.1 km^{2})
- Discharge
  - location: Fisher River
  - average: 4.30 cu ft/s (0.122 m^{3}/s) at mouth with Ararat River

Basin features
- Progression: Fisher River → Yadkin River → Pee Dee River → Winyah Bay → Atlantic Ocean
- River system: Yadkin River
- Tributaries
  - left: unnamed tributaries
  - right: unnamed tributaries
- Bridges: W Pine Street (NC 89), Lumber Plant Road

Gully Creek is a 3.24 mi (5.21 km) long 1st order tributary to the Fisher River in Surry County, North Carolina.

== Course ==
Gully Creek rises in a spring on the divide of West Fork Chestnut Creek about 0.5 miles south of Low Gap, Virginia. From the spring at the stateline of Virginia, Gully Creek then flows south into Surry County, North Carolina and then southeast to join the Fisher River about 0.5 miles north of Lowgap.

== Watershed ==
Gully Creek drains 2.37 square miles (6.1 km^{2}) of area, receives about 49.1 in/year of precipitation, has a wetness index of 272.01, and is about 67% forested.

== See also ==
- List of rivers of North Carolina
