= South Fork Stewarts Creek =

Stream in Virginia, USA

South Fork Stewarts Creek Tributary to Stewarts Creek
- Location of South Fork Stewarts Creek mouth South Fork Stewarts Creek (the United States)

Location
- Country: United States
- State: Virginia
- County: Carroll

Physical characteristics
- Source: East Fork Chestnut Creek divide
  - location: about 0.5 miles north of Rich Mountain
  - coordinates: 36°34′55″N 080°48′47″W
  - elevation: 2,900 ft (880 m)
- Mouth
  - location: about 2 miles northwest of Lambsburg, Virginia
  - coordinates: 36°35′49″N 080°47′12″W
  - elevation: 1,683 ft (513 m)
- Length: 2.66 mi (4.28 km)
- Basin size: 2.17 square miles (5.6 km^{2})
- Discharge
  - location: Stewarts Creek
  - average: 5.30 cu ft/s (0.150 m^{3}/s) at mouth with Stewarts Creek

Basin features
- Progression: Stewarts Creek → Ararat River → Yadkin River → Pee Dee River → Winyah Bay → Atlantic Ocean
- River system: Yadkin River
- Tributaries
  - left: unnamed tributaries
  - right: unnamed tributaries
- Bridges: none

South Fork Stewarts Creek is a 2.66 mi (4.28 km) long 1st order tributary to Stewarts Creek in Carroll County, Virginia. This stream. along with North Fork Stewarts Creek, forms Stewarts Creek.

== Course ==
South Fork Stewarts Creek rises about 0.5 miles north of Rich Mountain in Carroll County and then flows generally east to join Stewarts Creek about 2 miles northwest of Lambsburg, Virginia.

== Watershed ==
South Fork Stewarts Creek drains 2.17 square miles (5.6 km^{2}) of area, receives about 54.4 in/year of precipitation, has a wetness index of 263.01, and is about 89% forested.

== See also ==
- List of Rivers of Virginia
