= Horns Creek (Fisher River tributary) =

Stream in North Carolina, USA

Horns Creek Tributary to Fisher River
- Location of Horns Creek mouth Horns Creek (Fisher River tributary) (the United States)

Location
- Country: United States
- State: North Carolina
- County: Surry

Physical characteristics
- Source: Beaver Creek divide
  - location: about 0.5 miles s south of Stott Knob
  - coordinates: 36°23′58″N 080°35′11″W
  - elevation: 1,258 ft (383 m)
- Mouth: Fisher River
  - location: about 0.25 miles west of Turkey Ford, North Carolina
  - coordinates: 36°27′07″N 080°40′29″W
  - elevation: 978 ft (298 m)
- Length: 1.73 mi (2.78 km)
- Basin size: 1.08 square miles (2.8 km^{2})
- Discharge
  - location: Fisher River
  - average: 1.72 cu ft/s (0.049 m^{3}/s) at mouth with Fisher River

Basin features
- Progression: Fisher River → Yadkin River → Pee Dee River → Winyah Bay → Atlantic Ocean
- River system: Yadkin River
- Tributaries
  - left: unnamed tributaries
  - right: unnamed tributaries
- Bridges: Pony Lane (x2), Turner Mountain Road, Turkey Ford Road

Horns Creek is a 1.73 mi (2.78 km) long 2nd order tributary to the Fisher River in Surry County, North Carolina.

== Course ==
Horns Creek rises 0.5 miles south of Stotts Knob. Horns Creek then flows southeast to join the Fisher River about 0.25 miles west of Turkey Ford, North Carolina.

== Watershed ==
Horns Creek drains 1.08 square miles (2.8 km^{2}) of area, receives about 48.1 in/year of precipitation, has a wetness index of 301.57, and is about 66% forested.

== See also ==
- List of rivers of North Carolina
