= Beaver Creek (Fisher River tributary) =

Stream in North Carolina, USA

Beaver Creek Tributary to Fisher River
- Location of Beaver Creek mouth Beaver Creek (Fisher River tributary) (the United States)

Location
- Country: United States
- State: North Carolina
- County: Surry

Physical characteristics
- Source: Bull Creek divide
  - location: about 1 mile northwest of Black Water, North Carolina
  - coordinates: 36°24′30″N 80°38′00″W
  - elevation: 1,340 ft (410 m)
- Mouth: Fisher River
  - location: about 2 miles south-southwest of Turkey Ford, North Carolina
  - coordinates: 36°21′41″N 80°40′31″W
  - elevation: 938 ft (286 m)
- Length: 5.51 mi (8.87 km)
- Basin size: 5.86 square miles (15.2 km^{2})
- Discharge
  - location: Fisher River
  - average: 8.75 cu ft/s (0.248 m^{3}/s) at mouth with Fisher River

Basin features
- Progression: Fisher River → Yadkin River → Pee Dee River → Winyah Bay → Atlantic Ocean
- River system: Yadkin River
- Tributaries
  - left: unnamed tributaries
  - right: unnamed tributaries
- Bridges: Crotts Road, Johnson Road, Turkey Ford Road, Simpson Mill Road

Beaver Creek is a 5.51 mi (8.87 km) long 2nd order tributary to the Fisher River in Surry County, North Carolina.

== Course ==
Beaver Creek rises about 1 mile northwest of Black Water, North Carolina. Beaver Creek then flows southwest to join the Fisher River about 2 miles south-southwest of Turkey Ford, North Carolina.

== Watershed ==
Beaver Creek drains 5.86 square miles (15.2 km^{2}) of area, receives about 48.2 in/year of precipitation, has a wetness index of 342.00, and is about 52% forested.

== See also ==
- List of rivers of North Carolina
