= Cody Creek (Fisher River tributary) =

Stream in North Carolina, U.S.

Cody Creek Tributary to Fisher River
- Location of Cody Creek mouth Cody Creek (Fisher River tributary) (the United States)

Location
- Country: United States
- State: North Carolina
- County: Surry
- City: Dobson

Physical characteristics
- Source: divide of unnamed tributary to Fisher River
  - location: pond at Dobson, North Carolina
  - coordinates: 36°19′29″N 080°41′30″W
  - elevation: 1,210 ft (370 m)
- Mouth: Fisher River
  - location: about 1 mile east-southeast of Fairview, North Carolina
  - coordinates: 36°23′43″N 080°44′00″W
  - elevation: 894 ft (272 m)
- Length: 6.80 mi (10.94 km)
- Basin size: 17.65 square miles (45.7 km^{2})
- Discharge
  - location: Fisher River
  - average: 25.86 cu ft/s (0.732 m^{3}/s) at mouth with Fisher River

Basin features
- Progression: Fisher River → Yadkin River → Pee Dee River → Winyah Bay → Atlantic Ocean
- River system: Yadkin River
- Tributaries
  - left: unnamed tributaries
  - right: Whiteoak Branch; King Creek
- Bridges: Blessing Drive, Bentwood Lane, Cody Trail, Old Depot Lane, US 601, NC 268

Cody Creek is a 6.80 mi (10.94 km) long 2nd order tributary to the Fisher River in Surry County, North Carolina.

== Variant names ==
According to the Geographic Names Information System, it has also been known historically as:

- Codys Creek

== Course ==
Cody Creek rises in a pond at Dobson, North Carolina. Cody Creek then flows southeast to join the Fisher River about 1 mile east-southeast of Fairview.

== Watershed ==
Cody Creek drains 17.65 square miles (45.7 km^{2}) of area, receives about 48.7 in/year of precipitation, has a wetness index of 378.07, and is about 30% forested.

== See also ==
- List of rivers of North Carolina
