= Burris Creek (Fisher River tributary) =

Stream in North Carolina, USA

Burris Creek Tributary to Fisher River
- Location of Burris Creek mouth Burris Creek (Fisher River tributary) (the United States)

Location
- Country: United States
- State: North Carolina
- County: Surry

Physical characteristics
- Source: Pine Branch divide
  - location: about 4 miles south of Blevins Store, North Carolina
  - coordinates: 36°25′00″N 080°46′47″W
  - elevation: 1,350 ft (410 m)
- Mouth: Fisher River
  - location: about 4 miles southeast of Blevins Store, North Carolina
  - coordinates: 36°25′45″N 080°46′47″W
  - elevation: 1,115 ft (340 m)
- Length: 4.14 mi (6.66 km)
- Basin size: 3.19 square miles (8.3 km^{2})
- Discharge
  - location: Fisher River
  - average: 5.17 cu ft/s (0.146 m^{3}/s) at mouth with Fisher River

Basin features
- Progression: Fisher River → Yadkin River → Pee Dee River → Winyah Bay → Atlantic Ocean
- River system: Yadkin River
- Tributaries
  - left: unnamed tributaries
  - right: unnamed tributaries
- Bridges: Crossroad Church Road, Jackoos Lane, Hodges Mill Road

Burris Creek is a 4.14 mi (6.66 km) long 2nd order tributary of the Fisher River located in Surry County, North Carolina.

== Variant names ==
According to the Geographic Names Information System, it has also been known historically as:

- Burriss Creek

== Course ==
Burris Creek originates on the Pine Branch divide, approximately 4 miles south of Blevins Store, North Carolina. Burris Creek flows southeast before turning northeast to join the Fisher River, about 4 miles southeast of Blevins Store.

== Watershed ==
Burris Creek drains an area of 3.17 square miles (8.2 km^{2}), receives approximately 49.0 inches/year of precipitation, has a wetness index of 366.74, and is about 56% forested.

== See also ==
- List of rivers of North Carolina
