= Dunagan Creek =

Stream in North Carolina, USA

Dunagan Creek Tributary to Fisher River
- Location of Dunagan Creek mouth Dunagan Creek (the United States)

Location
- Country: United States
- State: North Carolina
- County: Surry
- City: Stony Knoll

Physical characteristics
- Source: West Double Creek divide
  - location: Stony Knoll, North Carolina
  - coordinates: 36°18′28″N 080°40′13″W
  - elevation: 1,098 ft (335 m)
- Mouth: Fisher River
  - location: about 1.5 miles southwest of Stony Knoll, North Carolina
  - coordinates: 36°17′30″N 080°41′48″W
  - elevation: 875 ft (267 m)
- Length: 2.04 mi (3.28 km)
- Basin size: 1.13 square miles (2.9 km^{2})
- Discharge
  - location: Fisher River
  - average: 1.71 cu ft/s (0.048 m^{3}/s) at mouth with Fisher River

Basin features
- Progression: Fisher River → Yadkin River → Pee Dee River → Winyah Bay → Atlantic Ocean
- River system: Yadkin River
- Tributaries
  - left: unnamed tributaries
  - right: unnamed tributaries
- Bridges: Buck Fork Road

Dunagan Creek is a 2.04 mi (3.28 km) long 1st order tributary to the Fisher River in Surry County, North Carolina. This is the only stream of this name in the United States.

== Course ==
Dunagan Creek rises at Stony Knoll, North Carolina. Dunagan Creek then flows southwest to join the Fisher River about 1.5 miles southwest of Stony Knoll.

== Watershed ==
Dunagan Creek drains 1.13 square miles (2.9 km^{2}) of area, receives about 48.0 in/year of precipitation, has a wetness index of 320.76, and is about 65% forested.

== See also ==
- List of rivers of North Carolina
