= Endicott Creek (Fisher River tributary) =

Stream in North Carolina, USA

Endicott Creek Tributary to Fisher River
- Location of Endicott Creek mouth Endicott Creek (Fisher River tributary) (the United States)

Location
- Country: United States
- State: North Carolina
- County: Surry

Physical characteristics
- Source: Christian Creek divide
  - location: about 1.5 miles northwest of Racoon Mountain
  - coordinates: 36°29′36″N 080°52′15″W
  - elevation: 1,675 ft (511 m)
- Mouth: Fisher River
  - location: about 1 mile east of Raven Knob
  - coordinates: 36°28′14″N 080°49′59″W
  - elevation: 1,195 ft (364 m)
- Length: 3.60 mi (5.79 km)
- Basin size: 3.28 square miles (8.5 km^{2})
- Discharge
  - location: Fisher River
  - average: 5.15 cu ft/s (0.146 m^{3}/s) at mouth with Fisher River

Basin features
- Progression: Fisher River → Yadkin River → Pee Dee River → Winyah Bay → Atlantic Ocean
- River system: Yadkin River
- Tributaries
  - left: Little Endicott Creek
  - right: unnamed tributaries
- Waterbodies: Raven Knob Lake
- Bridges: Scout Valley Trail (x2), Blevins Store Road

Endicott Creek is a 3.60 mi (5.79 km) long 2nd order tributary to the Fisher River in Surry County, North Carolina.

== Variant names ==
According to the Geographic Names Information System, it has also been known historically as:

- Endicott Branch

== Course ==
Endicott Creek rises on the Christian Creek divide about 1.5 miles northwest of Racoon (sic) Mountain. Endicott Creek then flows southeast to join the Fisher River about 1 mile east of Raven Knob.

== Watershed ==
Endicott Creek drains 3.28 square miles (8.5 km^{2}) of area, receives about 47.4 in/year of precipitation, has a wetness index of 269.21, and is about 94% forested.

== See also ==
- List of rivers of North Carolina
