= Turners Creek (Stewarts Creek tributary) =

Stream in North Carolina, USA

Turners Creek Tributary to Stewarts Creek
- Location of Turners Creek mouth Turners Creek (Stewarts Creek tributary) (the United States)

Location
- Country: United States
- State: North Carolina
- County: Surry
- City: Mount Airy

Physical characteristics
- Source: Moores Fork divide
  - location: about 3 miles southeast of Pine Ridge, North Carolina
  - coordinates: 36°29′05″N 080°41′34″W
  - elevation: 1,280 ft (390 m)
- Mouth
  - location: Mount Airy, North Carolina
  - coordinates: 36°28′41″N 080°38′44″W
  - elevation: 1,010 ft (310 m)
- Length: 3.03 mi (4.88 km)
- Basin size: 1.63 square miles (4.2 km^{2})
- Discharge
  - location: Stewarts Creek
  - average: 2.59 cu ft/s (0.073 m^{3}/s) at mouth with Stewarts Creek

Basin features
- Progression: Stewarts Creek → Ararat River → Yadkin River → Pee Dee River → Winyah Bay → Atlantic Ocean
- River system: Yadkin River
- Tributaries
  - left: unnamed tributaries
  - right: unnamed tributaries
- Bridges: McKinney Road

Turners Creek is a 3.03 mi (4.88 km) long 1st order tributary to Stewarts Creek in Surry County, North Carolina.

== Course ==
Turners Creek rises about 3 miles southeast of Pine Ridge, North Carolina, in Surry County and then flows east-southeast to join Stewarts Creek on the west side of Mount Airy, North Carolina.

== Watershed ==
Turners Creek drains 1.63 square miles (4.2 km^{2}) of area, receives about 47.5 in/year of precipitation, has a wetness index of 341.81, and is about 42% forested.

== See also ==
- List of Rivers of North Carolina
