= Burkes Creek (Stewarts Creek tributary) =

Stream in North Carolina, USA

Burkes Creek Tributary to Stewarts Creek
- Location of Burkes Creek mouth Burkes Creek (Stewarts Creek tributary) (the United States)

Location
- Country: United States
- State: North Carolina
- County: Surry

Physical characteristics
- Source: Jackson Creek divide
  - location: pond about 3 miles northwest of White Plains, North Carolina
  - coordinates: 36°27′19″N 080°40′07″W
  - elevation: 1,220 ft (370 m)
- Mouth
  - location: about 0.5 miles southwest of Mount Airy, North Carolina
  - coordinates: 36°27′19″N 080°40′07″W
  - elevation: 991 ft (302 m)
- Length: 2.48 mi (3.99 km)
- Basin size: 7.11 square miles (18.4 km^{2})
- Discharge
  - location: Stewarts Creek
  - average: 4.46 cu ft/s (0.126 m^{3}/s) at mouth with Stewarts Creek

Basin features
- Progression: Stewarts Creek → Ararat River → Yadkin River → Pee Dee River → Winyah Bay → Atlantic Ocean
- River system: Yadkin River
- Tributaries
  - left: unnamed tributaries
  - right: unnamed tributaries
- Bridges: I-74, McKinney Road, Piedmont Triad West Drive, Scott Bunker Road

Burkes Creek is a 2.48 mi (3.99 km) long 2nd order tributary to Stewarts Creek in Surry County, North Carolina.

== Course ==
Burkes Creek rises in a pond about 3 miles northwest of White Plains, North Carolina, in Surry County and then flows east-northeast to join Stewarts Creek about 0.5 miles southwest of Mount Airy, North Carolina.

== Watershed ==
Burkes Creek drains 2.96 square miles (7.7 km^{2}) of area, receives about 47.5 in/year of precipitation, has a wetness index of 376.00, and is about 25% forested.

== See also ==
- List of Rivers of North Carolina
