= Ladonia =

Ladonia can refer to:

- Ladonia, Alabama, United States
- Ladonia, North Carolina, United States
- Ladonia, Texas, United States
- Ladonia (micronation)

== See also ==
- Laddonia, Missouri, United States
