= Red Hill Creek (Fisher River tributary) =

Stream in North Carolina, USA

Red Hill Creek Tributary to Fisher River
- Location of Red Hill Creek mouth Red Hill Creek (Fisher River tributary) (the United States)

Location
- Country: United States
- State: North Carolina
- County: Surry

Physical characteristics
- Source: Potters Creek divide
  - location: about 1 mile west-southwest of Raven Knob
  - coordinates: 36°27′56″N 080°51′42″W
  - elevation: 1,680 ft (510 m)
- Mouth: Fisher River
  - location: about 0.5 miles southeast of Blevins Store, North Carolina
  - coordinates: 36°26′45″N 080°48′40″W
  - elevation: 1,150 ft (350 m)
- Length: 4.50 mi (7.24 km)
- Basin size: 2.81 square miles (7.3 km^{2})
- Discharge
  - location: Fisher River
  - average: 4.63 cu ft/s (0.131 m^{3}/s) at mouth with Fisher River

Basin features
- Progression: Fisher River → Yadkin River → Pee Dee River → Winyah Bay → Atlantic Ocean
- River system: Yadkin River
- Tributaries
  - left: unnamed tributaries
  - right: unnamed tributaries
- Bridges: Maranon Way, Rattler Ridge Trail, Haystack Road, Red Hill Creek Road, Fisher Valley Road

Red Hill Creek is a 4.50 mi (7.24 km) long 2nd order tributary to the Fisher River in Surry County, North Carolina.

== Course ==
Red Hill Creek rises on the Potters Creek divide about 1 mile west-southwest of Raven Knob. Red Hill Creek then flows south and then curves northeast to join the Fisher River about 0.5 miles southeast of Blevins Store, North Carolina.

== Watershed ==
Red Hill Creek drains 2.81 square miles (7.3 km^{2}) of area, receives about 49.0 in/year of precipitation, has a wetness index of 315.14, and is about 82% forested.

== See also ==
- List of rivers of North Carolina
