= Rockford Township, Surry County, North Carolina =

Township in Surry County, North Carolina, U.S.

Coordinates: 36.3081554°N 80.6548882°W

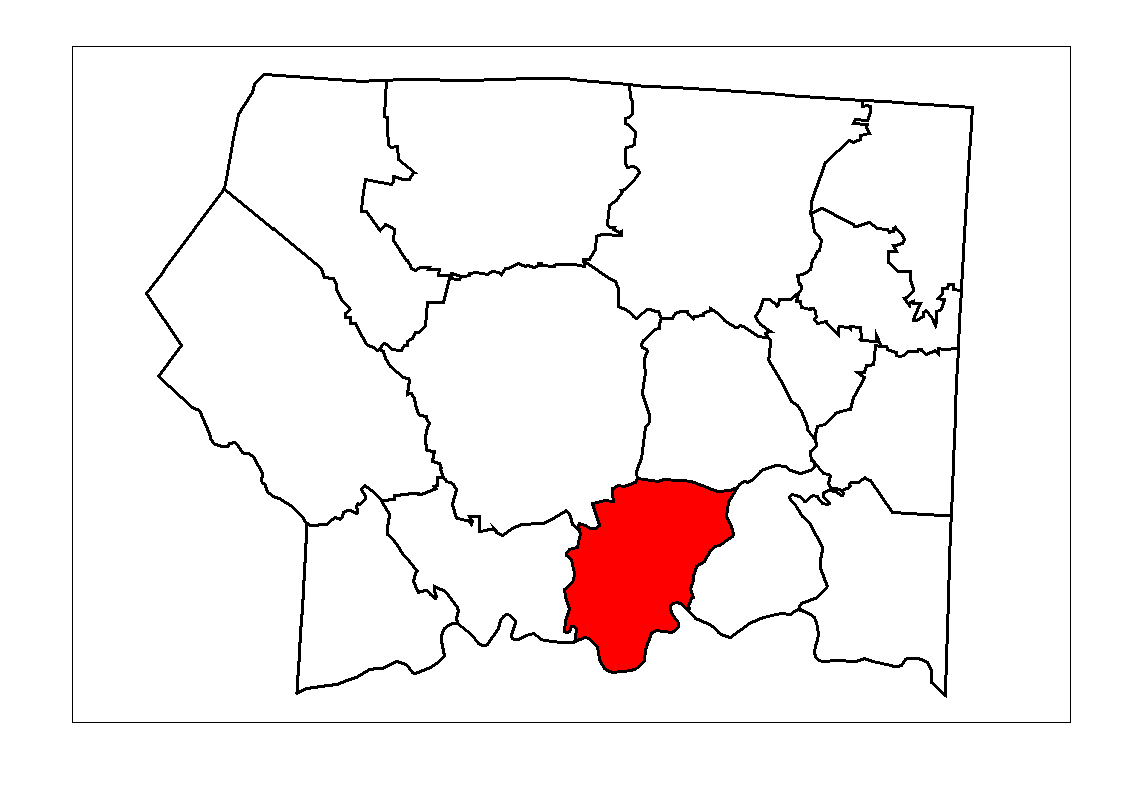
Location of Rockford Township in Surry County, N.C.

Rockford Township is one of fifteen townships in Surry County, North Carolina, United States. The township had a population of 1,745 according to the 2020 census.

Geographically, Rockford Township occupies 27.1 square miles (70 km^{2}) in southern Surry County, with its southern border consisting of the Yadkin River. There are no incorporated municipalities within Rockford Township; however, there are several smaller, unincorporated communities located here, including, Copeland, Level Cross, Rockford and Stony Knoll.
