= Marsh Township, Surry County, North Carolina =

Township in North Carolina, United States

Coordinates: 36.305203°N 80.754698°W

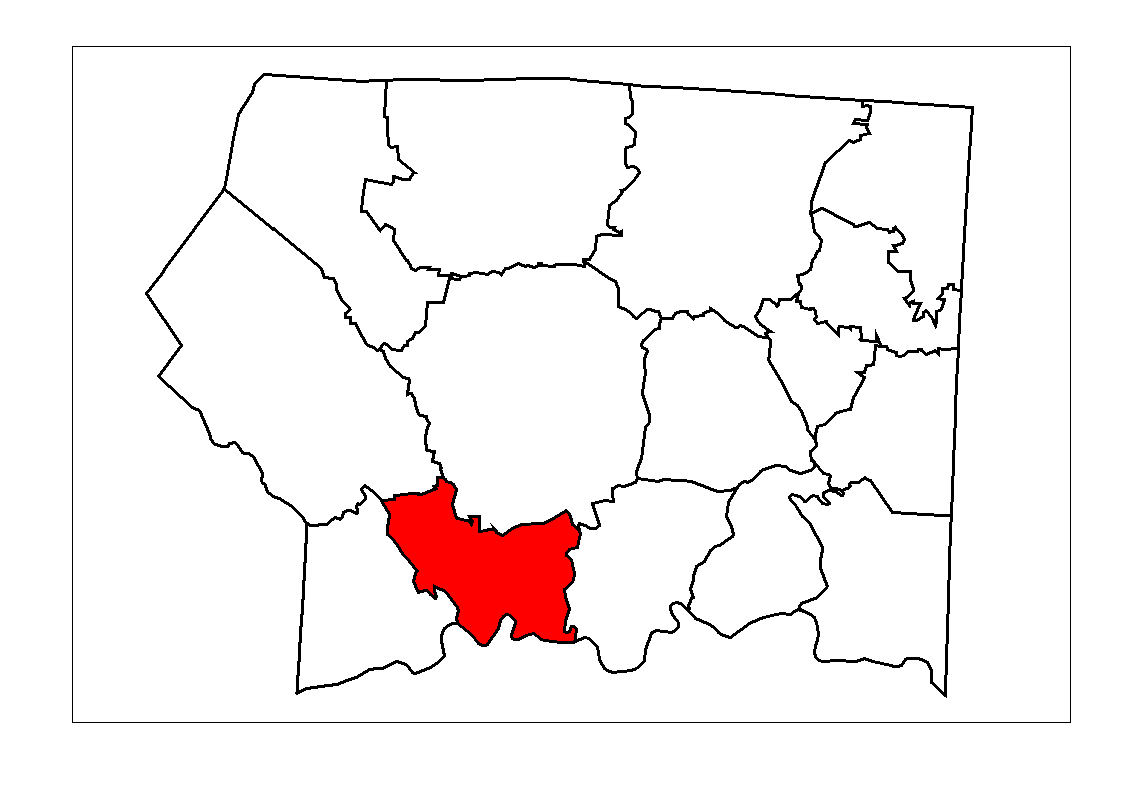
Location of Marsh Township in Surry County, N.C.

Marsh Township is one of fifteen townships in Surry County, North Carolina, United States. The township had a population of 2,371 according to the 2020 census.

Geographically, Marsh Township occupies 24.1 square miles (62 km^{2}) in southern Surry County, with its southern border consisting of the Yadkin River. There are no incorporated municipalities within Marsh Township; however, there are several smaller, unincorporated communities located here, including Burch, Crutchfield, Fairview and Little Richmond.
