= Burch, North Carolina =

Unincorporated community in North Carolina, US

Burch, North Carolina Burch Station
- unincorporated community
- Interactive map of Burch, North Carolina
- Coordinates: 36°16′33.49″N 80°45′59.24″W
- Country: United States
- State: North Carolina
- County: Surry
- Elevation: 899 ft (274 m)
- GNIS feature ID: 982267

Burch, or more commonly known locally as Burch Station, is an unincorporated community along the Yadkin River in the Marsh Township of Surry County, North Carolina, United States. The community sits on the mouth of the Mitchell River where it empties into the Yadkin. The community is known as Burch Station after the former train depot there on the former Southern Railway, now used by the Yadkin Valley Railroad.
