= Cooks Creek =

Cooks Creek may refer to:

== Streams ==
- Cooks Creek (Antigua), in Saint Mary and Saint John, Antigua, Antigua and Barbuda
- Cooks Creek (Fisher River tributary), in Surry County, North Carolina, United States
- Cooks Creek (Delaware River tributary), in Bucks County, Pennsylvania, United States

== Communities ==
- Cooks Creek, Manitoba, Canada
