= Little Fisher River =

Stream in North Carolina, USA

Little Fisher River Tributary to Fisher River
- Location of Little Fisher River mouth Little Fisher River (the United States)

Location
- Country: United States
- State: North Carolina
- County: Surry

Physical characteristics
- Source: south side of the Blue Ridge escarpment
  - location: about 0.5 miles southwest of Fisher Peak
  - coordinates: 36°33′15″N 080°49′45″W
  - elevation: 2,610 ft (800 m)
- Mouth: Fisher River
  - location: about 0.5 miles northeast of New Hope, North Carolina
  - coordinates: 36°25′18″N 080°42′04″W
  - elevation: 1,010 ft (310 m)
- Length: 16.78 mi (27.00 km)
- Basin size: 38.35 square miles (99.3 km^{2})
- Discharge
  - location: Fisher River
  - average: 56.45 cu ft/s (1.598 m^{3}/s) at mouth with Fisher River

Basin features
- Progression: Fisher River → Yadkin River → Pee Dee River → Winyah Bay → Atlantic Ocean
- River system: Yadkin River
- Tributaries
  - left: Auberry Creek; Ross Creek
  - right: Ring Creek; Beaverdam Creek; Hatchers Creek
- Bridges: Old Lowgap Road, Sutphin Trail, Round Peak Church Road, Twin Rocks Lane, Bryant Road, Richards Road, I-77, NC 89, Laurel Spring Church Road, Haystack Road, Red Brush Road

Little Fisher River is a 16.78 mi (27.00 km) long 4th order tributary to the Fisher River in Surry County, North Carolina. This is the only stream of this name in the United States.

== Variant names ==
According to the Geographic Names Information System, it has also been known historically as:

- Little Fish River
- Little Fishe River

== Course ==
Little Fisher River rises on the south side of the Blue Ridge Escarpment about 0.5 miles southwest of Fisher Peak. Little Fisher River then flows generally south to join the Fisher River about 0.5 miles southwest of New Hope, North Carolina.

== Watershed ==
Little Fisher River drains 38.35 square miles (99.3 km^{2}) of area, receives about 48.5 in/year of precipitation, has a wetness index of 336.03, and is about 56% forested.

== See also ==
- List of rivers of North Carolina
