= Stewarts Creek (Ararat River tributary) =

Stream in North Carolina, USA

Stewarts Creek Tributary to Ararat River
- Location of Stewarts Creek mouth Stewarts Creek (Ararat River tributary) (the United States)

Location
- Country: United States
- State: North Carolina; Virginia
- County: Surry; Carroll
- Cities: Mount Airy

Physical characteristics
- Source: confluence of North and South Forks
  - location: about 4 miles southwest of Pipers Gap, Virginia
  - coordinates: 36°35′50″N 080°47′13″W
  - elevation: 2,615 ft (797 m)
- Mouth: Ararat River
  - location: Mount Airy, North Carolina
  - coordinates: 36°28′05″N 080°36′15″W
  - elevation: 970 ft (300 m)
- Length: 20.24 mi (32.57 km)
- Basin size: 79.71 square miles (206.4 km^{2})
- Discharge
  - location: Ararat River
  - average: 120.96 cu ft/s (3.425 m^{3}/s) at mouth with Ararat River

Basin features
- Progression: Ararat River → Yadkin River → Pee Dee River → Winyah Bay → Atlantic Ocean
- River system: Yadkin River
- Tributaries
  - left: North Fork Stewarts Creek; Turkey Creek; Naked Run; Stony Creek; Benson Creek; Pauls Creek
  - right: South Fork Stewarts Creek; Flat Creek; Moores Fork; Turners Creek; Beech Creek; Burkes Creek
- Bridges: Chestnut Grove Road, I-74, W Imogene Church Road, Beamer Road, NC 89, Red Brush Road, US 601, Old Hwy 601, Park Drive

Stewarts Creek is a 20.24 mi (32.57 km) long 4th order tributary to the Ararat River in Surry County, North Carolina.

== Variant names ==
According to the Geographic Names Information System, it has also been known historically as:

- Bledsoe Creek
- Stewart Creek
- Stuarts Creek

== Course ==
Stewarts Creek originates at the confluence of North and South Fork about 4 miles southwest of Pipers Gap in Carroll County, Virginia. Stewarts Creek then flows southeast into Surry County, North Carolina to join the Ararat River at Mount Airy.

== Watershed ==
Stewarts Creek drains 79.71 square miles (206.4 km^{2}) of area, receives about 49.5 in/year of precipitation, has a wetness index of 333.21, and is about 57% forested.

== See also ==
- List of rivers of North Carolina
