= Rockford Historic District =

Historic district in North Carolina, United States

- U.S. National Register of Historic Places
- U.S. Historic district
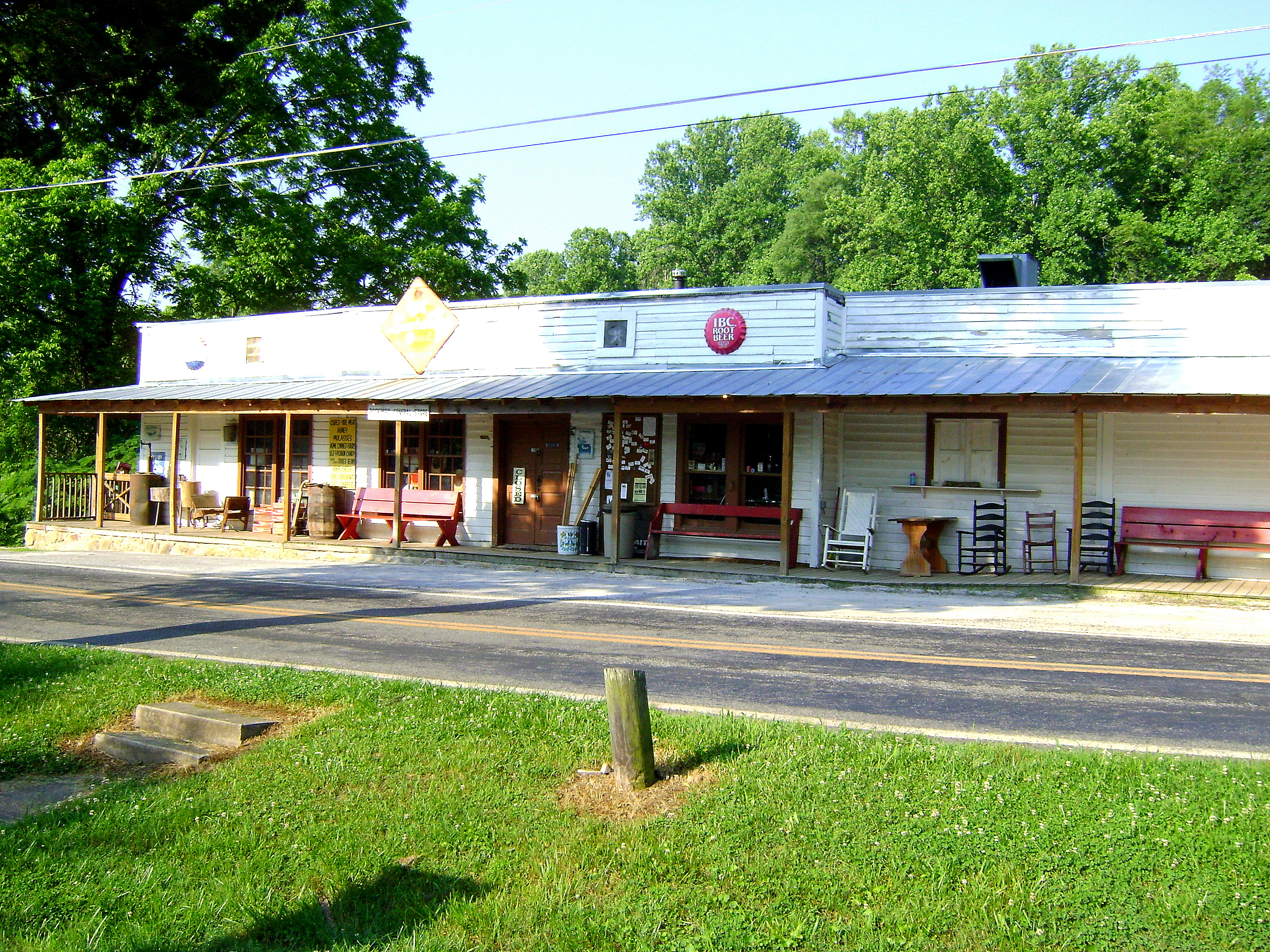
- Rockford General Store, May 2010

- Location within North Carolina Location within the United States
- Location: SR 2221, Rockford, North Carolina
- Coordinates: 36°16′09″N 80°39′10″W
- Area: 15 acres (6.1 ha)
- Built: c. 1790
- Architectural style: Greek Revival, Federal
- NRHP reference No.: 76001338
- Added to NRHP: August 27, 1976

Rockford Historic District is a national historic district located at Rockford, Surry County, North Carolina. The district encompasses 12 contributing buildings in the central business district of Rockford. They were primarily built between about 1790 and 1930 and include notable examples of Federal and Greek Revival architecture. Notable buildings include the Methodist Church (1912), former courthouse, York Tavern (c. 1800), Old Post Office, R. H. Clark's Store, the Tobacco Factory, the Grant-Burrus Hotel (c. 1790), and the former Masonic Lodge building.

It was added to the National Register of Historic Places in 1976.

== Gallery ==
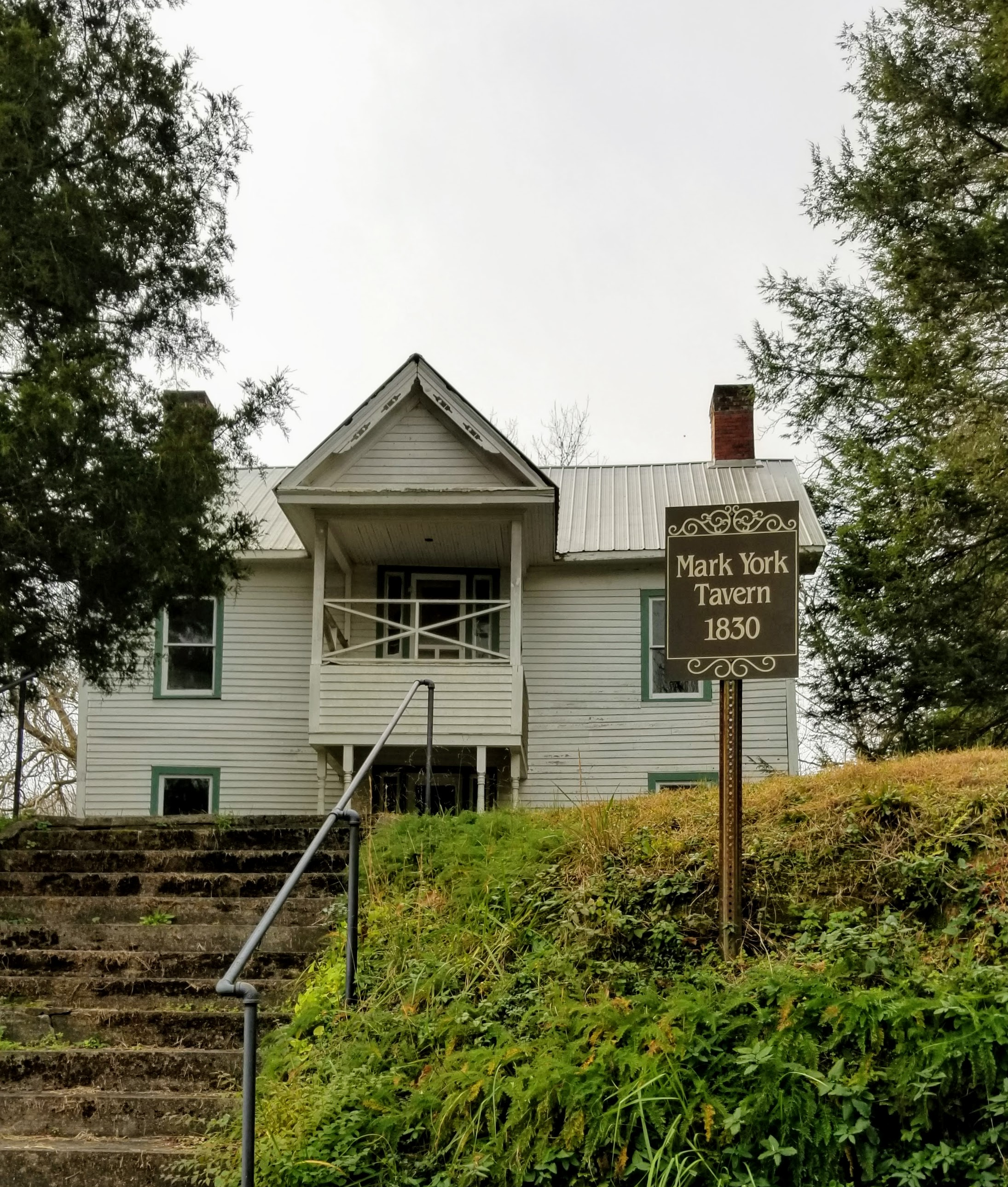
York Tavern, 2020

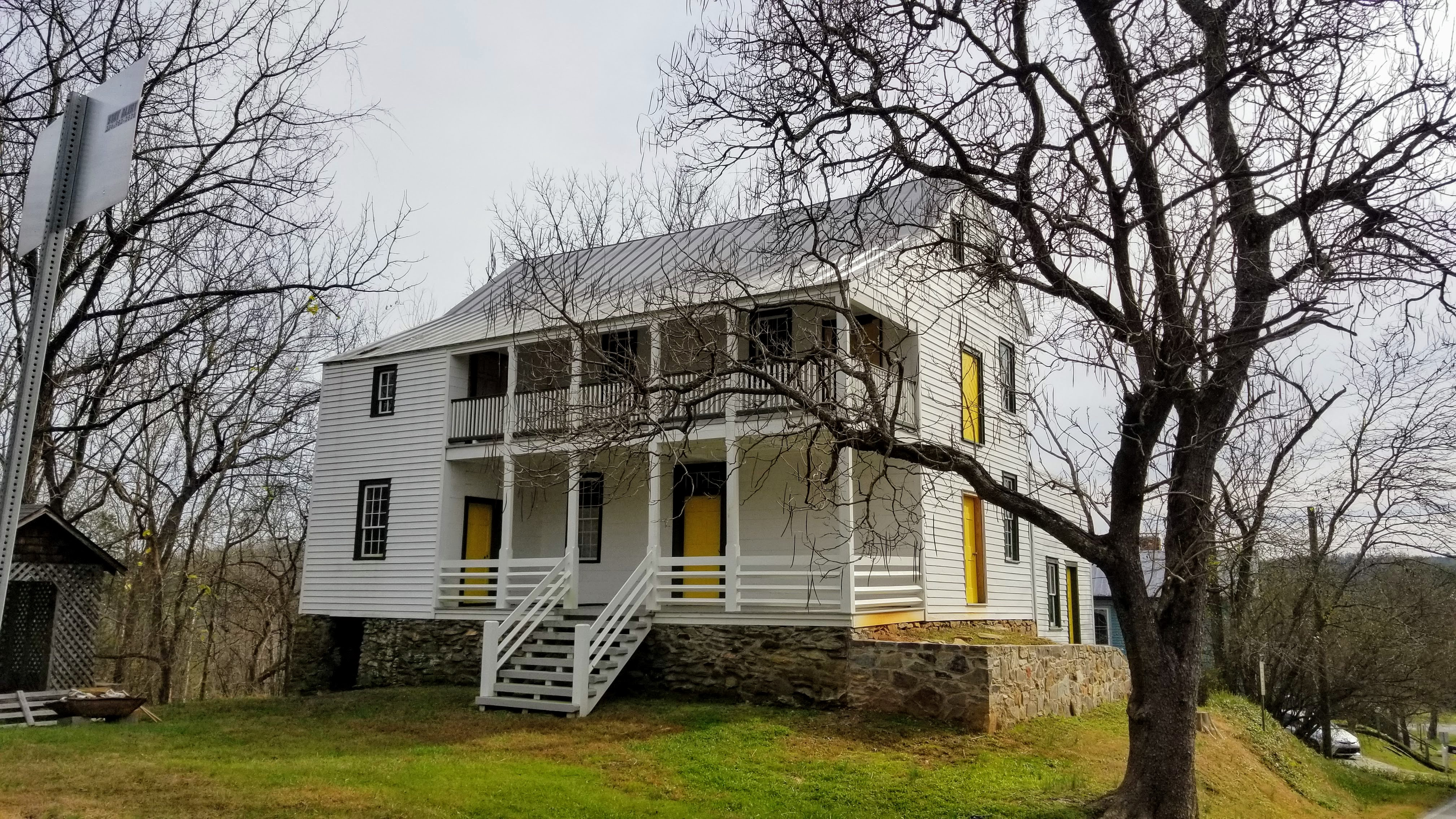
WP Dobson Store and Rockford Masonic Lodge, 2020

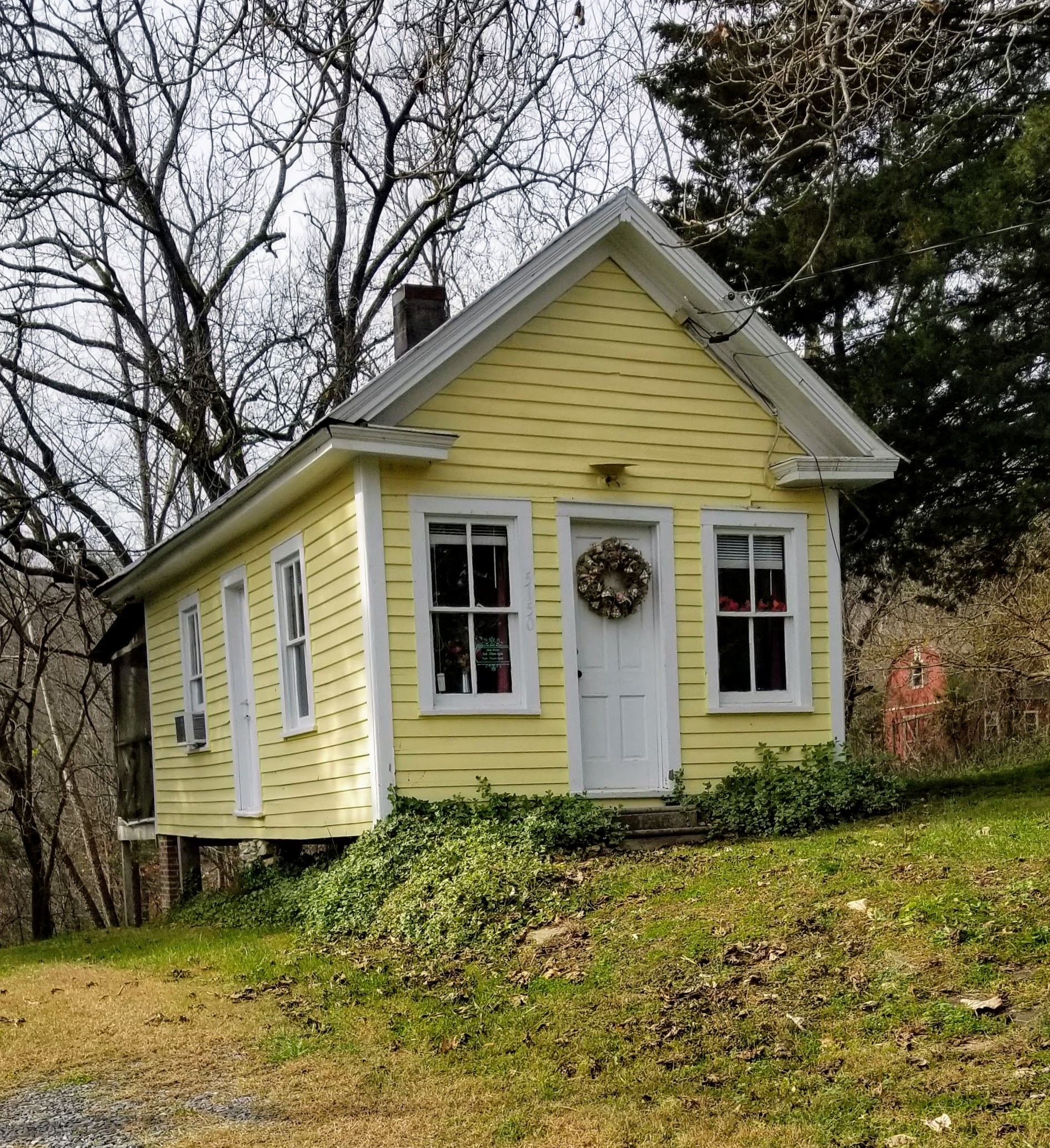
Rockford Post Office, 2020

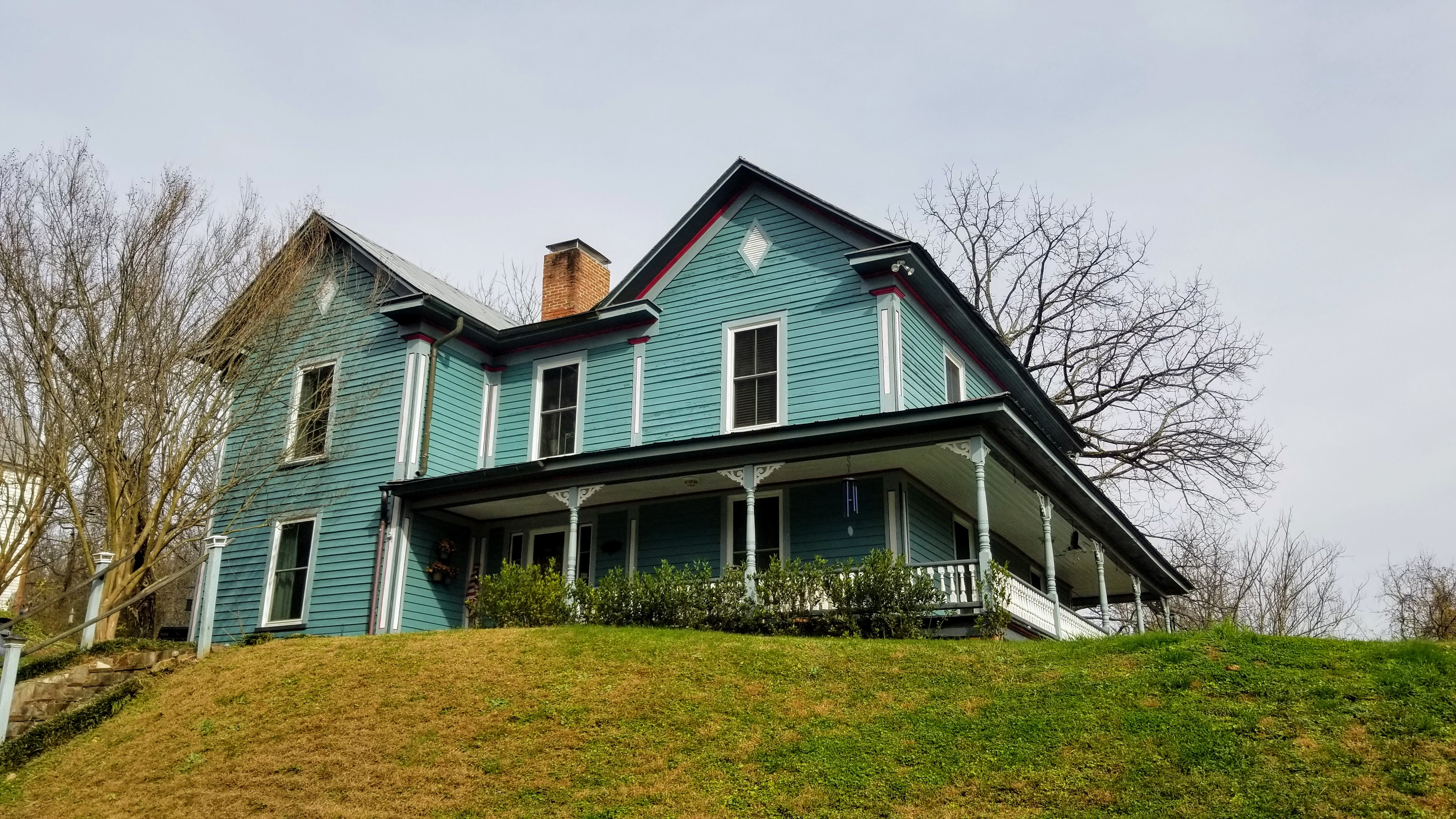
Reece House, 2020

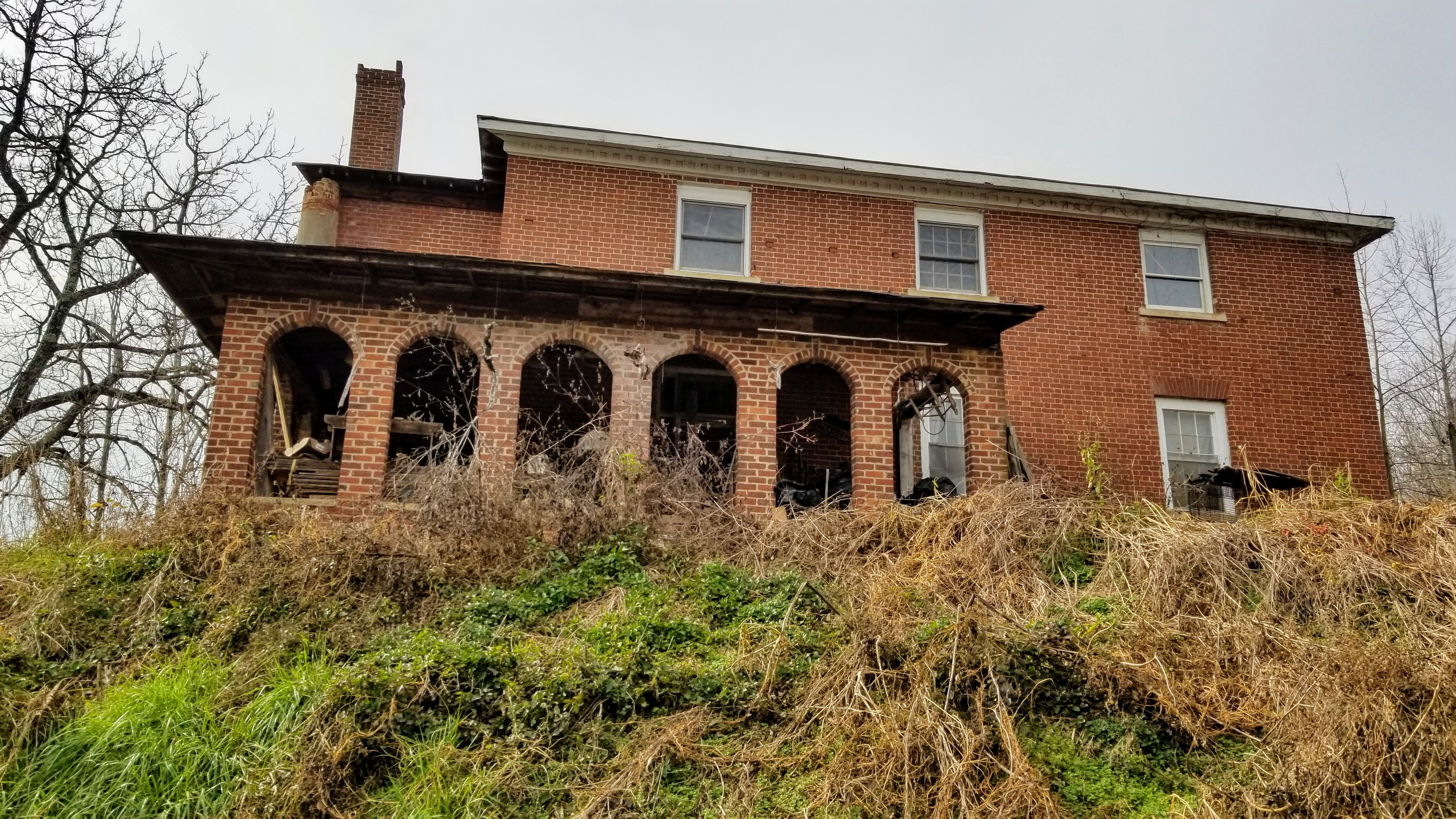
Old Surry County Courthouse, 2020

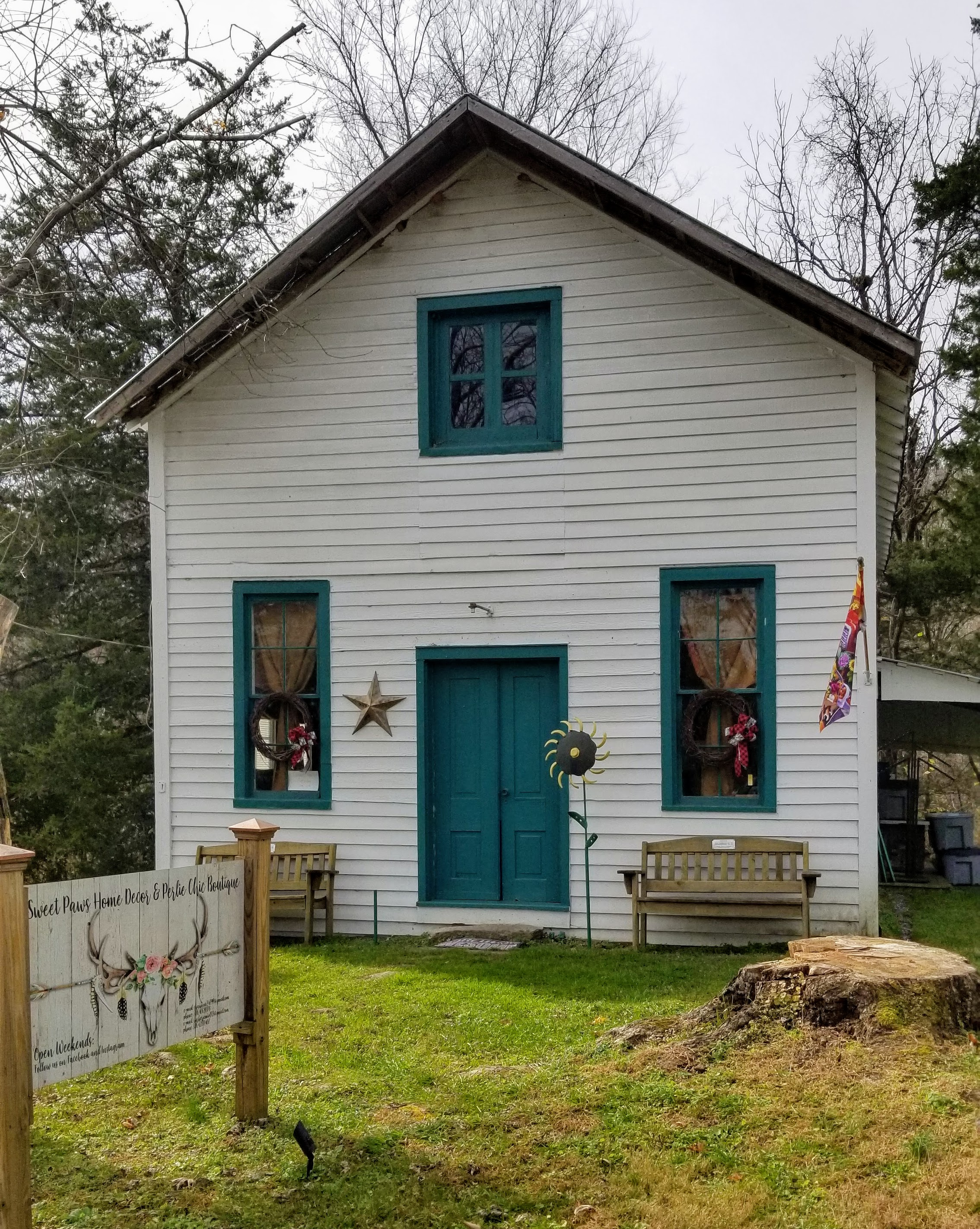
Dudley Glass Store, 2020
