= Rockford, North Carolina =

Unincorporated community in North Carolina, US

Coordinates: 36°16′05″N 80°38′56″W

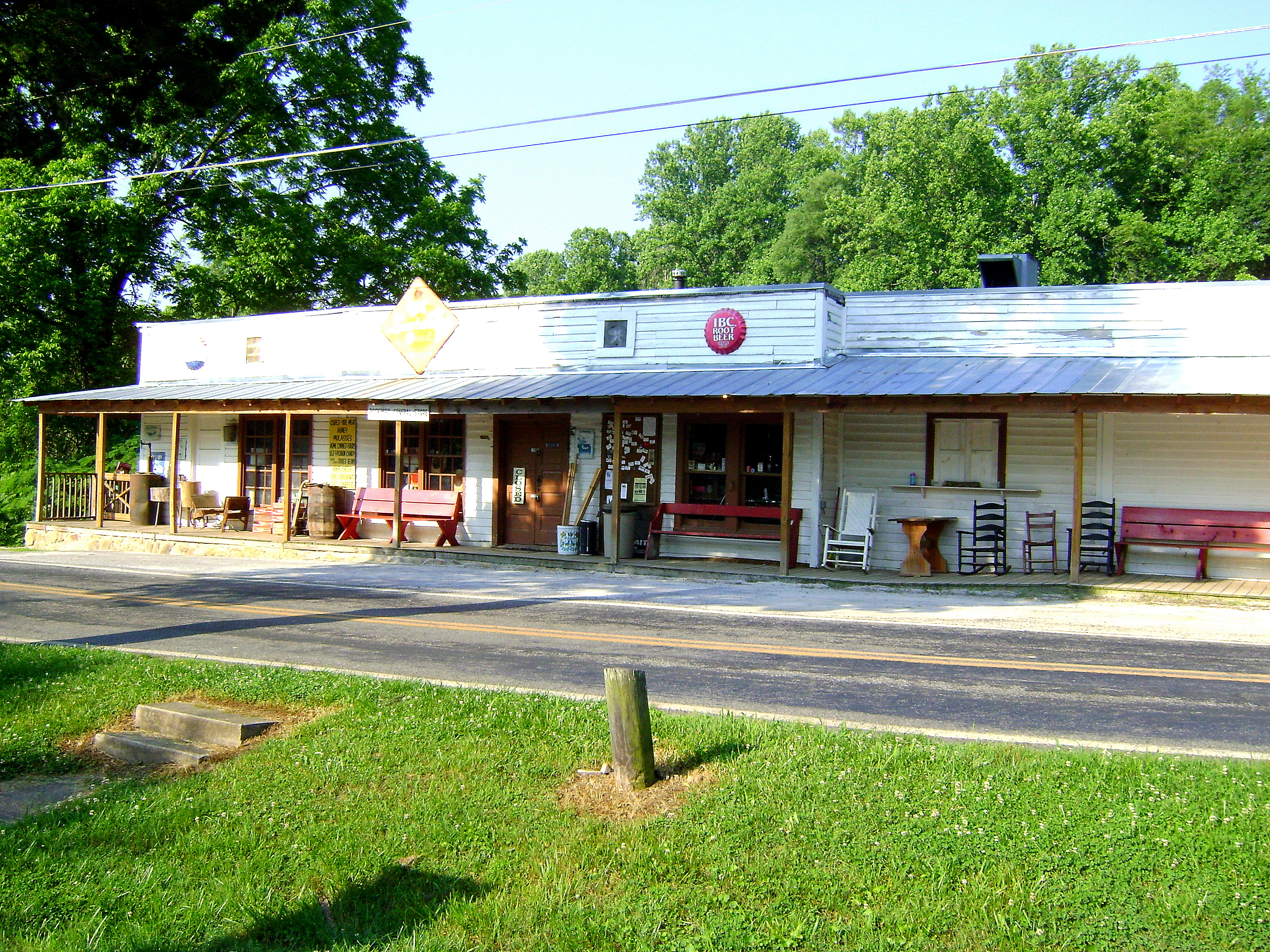
Rockford general store

Rockford is an unincorporated community and former town in southern Surry County, North Carolina, United States.

== Geography ==
Rockford is situated along the Yadkin River in the Rockford Township of southern Surry County. Rockford sits along the former Southern Railway, now used by the Yadkin Valley Railroad, which follows the Yadkin River through Surry County.

== History ==
Rockford was founded in 1790 to be the county seat of Surry after Surry was split to form Stokes County (including then modern-day Forsyth County as well as Stokes). The community was incorporated in 1819 but has been municipally inactive for many years (Powell 1968, p. 420). When the portion of Surry County south of the Yadkin River was used to create Yadkin County in 1851, the county government was moved to Dobson. Several notable historical structures from the village's period as county seat are still standing, including the former county courthouse.

Ferries shuttled people across the Yadkin River at Rockford until 1900, when piano-seller R.F. Bland charged a quarter to cross a bridge he built that connected the river's banks with an island. Floods swept the bridge away in the 1930s.

In 1962, a one-lane, low-water bridge was built to link the community with the nearest town, Boonville. A community group fought unsuccessfully to save the bridge. A modern high-rise bridge was built in 2002.

The Rockford Historic District was listed on the National Register of Historic Places in 1976.

== Attractions ==
- Rockford General Store is a popular gathering spot for locals and tourists. The store, with its uneven wooden floors, glass jars of candy and old photos of Rockford, retains much of its original charm. The store first opened about 1890.
- The J.F. Bland House, a good example of vernacular Victorian, was constructed around 1900. Mr. Bland was an accomplished musician and credited with bringing the first keyboard instruments to the Rockford Community. He also is credited with building the first bridge to Rockford over the Yadkin River.
- Rockford Methodist Church was built in 1913. Although it was closed by the Methodist Conference in 1967, it is still used for special events. The building includes a fresco by North Carolina artist Tony Griffin called "Come Unto Me." The work was dedicated in 1989 as part of the village's 200th anniversary celebration.
- Historic Rockford Inn Bed and Breakfast (ca. 1848) is situated at the crest of more than 6 rolling acres (24,000 m^{2})
- Rockford Post Office, c. 1900
- Dudley Glass Store is currently rented by Sweet Paws Home Goods & Perlie Chic Boutique and is called Davenport Gallery and Museum.
- Rockford Park is the site of the Grant-Burrus Hotel, which burned down in 1974.
- The Masonic Lodge, c. 1797

Rockford's Masonic hall was built around 1797 for the Unanimity Lodge Number 34 of the Masonic Order. After a new charter was granted in 1866, the lodge was renamed Rockford Lodge Number 251. The wood-and-stone lodge has been evaluated by the N.C. Department of Cultural Resources and officials from the Grand Lodge of Ancient Free and Accepted Masons of North Carolina. It is believed to be the oldest Masonic hall in northwestern North Carolina. Many of the most prominent members of the Rockford community attended meetings in this building. In 1848, the Baptist State Convention also was held there. In the late 19th century, the W.P. Dobson & Company mercantile business operated on the first floor. The business was owned by Charles B. Davis, W.P. Dobson III and G.M. Burrus.

In 1914, a 200-square-foot (19 m^{2}) addition was built onto the Masonic hall. That portion of the building served as Rockford's last U.S. Post Office between 1914 and 1975 and still has original counter window bars and mail slots. The Masonic building, along with two adjacent properties, were purchased by Evelyn Holyfield and her brother, Robert Hardin Holyfield, in 1970. Since 2002, the properties have been under the ownership of the Rockford Preservation Society, Inc.

== Restoration ==
In 1972, the Rockford Preservation Society, Inc. was established to begin restoration and preservation measures on the town of Rockford. Many of the buildings were in unstable conditions upon initially receiving the title to them; however, through funding from State and Federal Grants, the buildings have slowly been restored. The Methodist Church, Dudley Glass store, and Post Office building have all been successfully restored and opened up to the public. The Rockford Preservation Society, Inc. are now working on renovating The Mark York Tavern and Masonic Lodge and eventually, opening them up to the public as well. The Rockford Preservation Society, Inc. was unable to restore the Grant-Burrus Hotel building because it was burned down; however, the site of the fire has now been turned into Rockford Park, which still contains some remains of the hotel.

== Events ==
- The Rockford Sweet Potato Festival has been held annually in September since 1996. The festival is a brainchild of the late Annie Barnette, the owner of the Rockford General Store from 1972 until her death in 2004. The festival includes music, crafts and sweet potato sonker.
- Rockford Candlelight Christmas serves as a kick off for the holiday season. The service is held at the Rockford Methodist Church.

== See also ==
- Rockford Township
