= Franklin Township, Surry County, North Carolina =

Township in Surry County, North Carolina, U.S.

Coordinates: 36.5069964°N 80.8654534°W

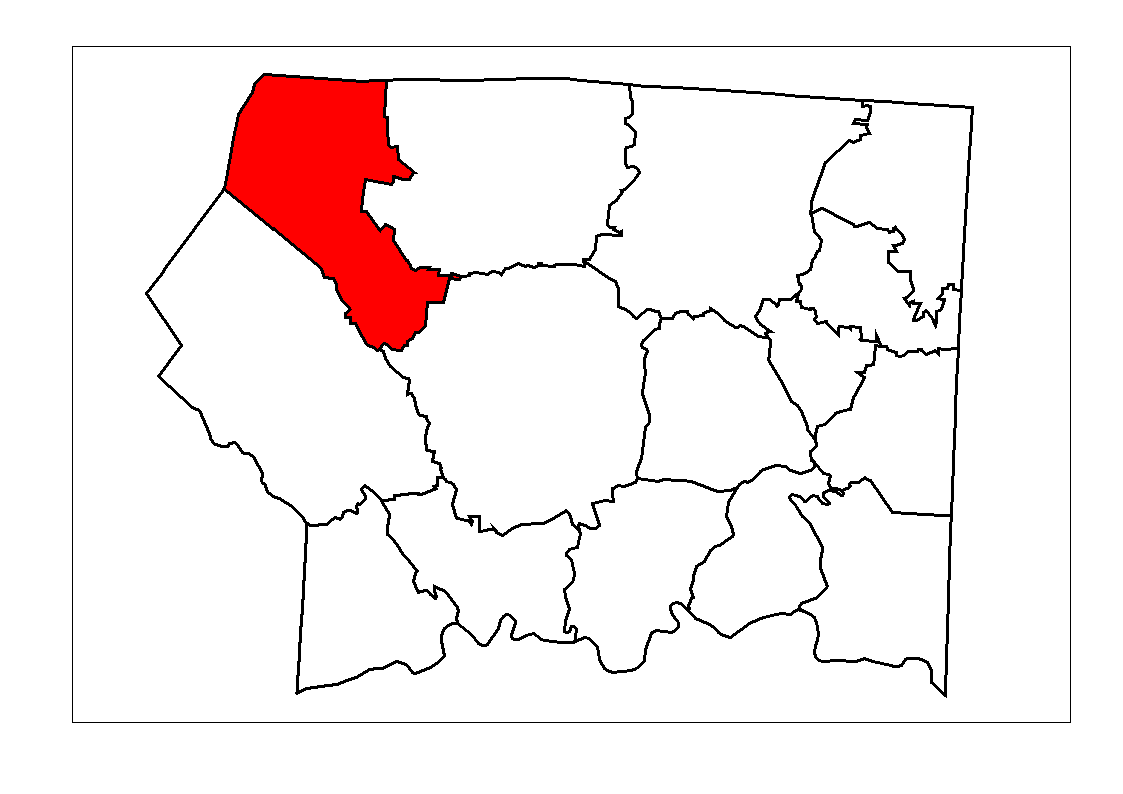
Location of Franklin Township in Surry County, N.C.

Franklin Township is one of fifteen townships in Surry County, North Carolina, United States. The township had a population of 2,130 according to the 2020 census. The township was named for the family of Jesse Franklin, a former governor of North Carolina and resident of the area.

Geographically, Franklin Township occupies 42.7 square miles (111 km^{2}) in northwestern Surry County, with its northern border shared with the state of Virginia. There are no incorporated municipalities within Franklin Township; however, there are several smaller, unincorporated communities located here, including Ladonia and Lowgap. Most of Franklin Township is mountainous and features several of Surry County's most prominent peaks.
