= Copeland, North Carolina =

Unincorporated community in North Carolina, US

Coordinates: 36°20′17″N 80°39′00″W

Copeland is an unincorporated community in the Rockford Township of Surry County, North Carolina, United States.

== Geography ==
The community is centered on the intersection of Stony Knoll Road and Copeland School Road/Double Creek Road and generally lies near the head of East Double Creek (Powell 1968, pp. 477–478). Copeland has an elevation of 1,172 feet above sea level. Area landmarks near the center of the community include Copeland Elementary School, the local masonic lodge, Ruritan club, and area churches.
