= New Hope, Surry County, North Carolina =

Unincorporated community in North Carolina, US

Coordinates: 36°25′12″N 80°42′43″W

New Hope is an unincorporated community in the Dobson Township of central Surry County, North Carolina. The community is on the outskirts of the town of Dobson along the Fisher River. Prominent landmarks include New Hope Baptist Church (founded 1878) and the Fisher River county park. The community of New Hope also has a mirror community just outside of Whiteville, NC as well on US HWY 701 a.k.a. (James B. White Hwy. South). This is home of the Tri-County sweet potato plant.
