= Ladonia, North Carolina =

Unincorporated community in the United States

Coordinates: 36°28′55″N 80°50′17″W

Ladonia is an unincorporated community located in the Franklin Township of northwest Surry County, North Carolina, United States. The community generally lies on the Fisher River and is centered on the intersection of Blevins Store Road and Ladonia Church Road (Powell 1968, p. 267). Area landmarks include Ladonia Baptist Church, M & M Signs and Awnings (right at the intersection of the two roads), and the nearby Raven Knob Scout Reservation.
