= Level Cross, Surry County, North Carolina =

Unincorporated community in North Carolina, US

Coordinates: 36°20′40″N 80°37′43″W

Location of Level Cross within the state of North Carolina

Level Cross is an unincorporated community located in the Rockford Township of Surry County, North Carolina, United States.

== Geography ==
The community is centered on the intersection of North Carolina Highway 268 and Siloam Road. The community derives its name from this intersection as the two roads crossed at a relatively level spot compared to the surrounding area (Powell 1968, p. 279). Prominent landmarks near the center of the community include Level Cross United Methodist Church.
