= Little Richmond, North Carolina =

Little Richmond
- Unincorporated community
- Location within the state of North Carolina
- Coordinates: 36°17′41″N 80°45′27″W
- Country: United States
- State: North Carolina
- County: Surry
- Elevation: 1,110 ft (340 m)
- Time zone: UTC-5 (Eastern (EST))
  - Summer (DST): UTC-4 (EDT)
- ZIP codes: 28621 (Elkin)
- Area code: 336
- GNIS feature ID: 988748

Little Richmond is an unincorporated community located in the Marsh Township of Surry County, North Carolina.

== Geography ==
The community is centered on the intersection of North Carolina Highway 268 and Joe Layne Mill Road. Near this intersection are the Little Richmond Baptist Church, founded in 1872, and Little Richmond Cemetery. Other landmarks in the community include Little Richmond Primitive Baptist Church, New Hope Pentecostal Holiness Church and a C.C. Camp Volunteer Fire Department Substation. Former landmarks that once stood in this vicinity include the Little Richmond School and a former United States post office called Rusk.

Generally, the community resides near the junction of Snow Creek and the Mitchell River and has an elevation of 1,110 feet (340 m) above sea level (Powell 1968, p. 291).
