= Fisher River (North Carolina) =

Stream in North Carolina, USA

Fisher River Tributary to Yadkin River
- Location of Fisher River mouth

Location
- Country: United States
- State: North Carolina; Virginia
- Counties: Surry (NC); Grayson (VA)

Physical characteristics
- Source: divide between Fisher River and New River
  - location: about 1 mile east of Low Gap, Virginia
  - coordinates: 36°34′13″N 080°52′03″W
  - elevation: 2,640 ft (800 m)
- Mouth: Yadkin River
  - location: Crutchfield, North Carolina
  - coordinates: 36°16′02″N 080°41′33″W
  - elevation: 840 ft (260 m)
- Length: 43.0 mi (69.2 km)
- Basin size: 164.27 square miles (425.5 km^{2})
- Discharge
  - location: Yadkin River
  - average: 238.53 cu ft/s (6.754 m^{3}/s) at mouth with Yadkin River

Basin features
- Progression: Yadkin River → Pee Dee River → Winyah Bay → Atlantic Ocean
- River system: Yadkin River
- Tributaries
  - left: Camp Branch; Sage Creek; Little Fisher River; Cooks Creek; Horns Creek; Beaver Creek; Little Beaver Creek; Dunagan Creek; Davenport Creek
  - right: Gully Creek; Roaring Fork; Endicott Creek; Red Hill Creek; Flat Branch; Burris Creek; Cody Creek; Bear Creek; Pheasant Creek

The Fisher River is a tributary of the Yadkin River in northwestern North Carolina in the United States, also draining a very small portion of southwestern Virginia. Via the Yadkin it is part of the watershed of the Pee Dee River, which flows to the Atlantic Ocean. According to the Geographic Names Information System, it has also been known historically as "Big Fishers River," "Fish River" and "Fishe River."

The Fisher River rises in the Blue Ridge Mountains in the southeastern extremity of Grayson County, Virginia, but flows for nearly all of its length in Surry County, North Carolina, initially southeastwardly. Near Dobson, it collects the short Little Fisher River and turns southward to its confluence with the Yadkin River, about 3 mi (5 km) north-northeast of Boonville.

== See also ==
- List of North Carolina rivers
- List of Virginia rivers
