= Mitchell River (North Carolina) =

Stream in North Carolina, USA

Mitchell River Tributary to Yadkin River
- Location of Mitchell River mouth Mitchell River (North Carolina) (the United States)

Location
- Country: United States
- State: North Carolina
- County: Alleghany; Surry

Physical characteristics
- Source: divide between Mitchell River and Little River
  - location: about 1.5 miles north of Roaring Gap, North Carolina
  - coordinates: 36°25′09″N 080°59′51″W
  - elevation: 2,740 ft (840 m)
- Mouth: Yadkin River
  - location: Burch, North Carolina
  - coordinates: 36°16′31″N 080°46′10″W
  - elevation: 856 ft (261 m)
- Length: 21.62 mi (34.79 km)
- Basin size: 108.17 square miles (280.2 km^{2})
- Discharge
  - location: Yadkin River
  - average: 172.17 cu ft/s (4.875 m^{3}/s) at mouth with Yadkin River

Basin features
- Progression: east then southeast
- River system: Yadkin
- Tributaries
  - left: Stewart Fork; Long Creek; Mill Creek; Saddle Mountain Creek; Butler Creek; Robertson Creek; Potters Creek; Pine Branch; Snow Creek
  - right: Mill Creek; South Fork Mitchell River; Camp Creek
- Bridges: Devotion Estate Way (x5), Haystack Road (x3), River Road, Judsville School Road, Millstone Trail, Kapps Mill Road, Zephry Mountain Park Road, I-77, NC 268

The Mitchell River is a tributary of the Yadkin River in northwestern North Carolina in the United States. Via the Yadkin it is part of the watershed of the Pee Dee River, which flows to the Atlantic Ocean. According to the Geographic Names Information System, it has also been known historically as "Mitchells River," "Mitchels River," and "Mountain Creek."

The Mitchell rises in eastern Alleghany County in the Blue Ridge Mountains, and flows generally southeastwardly through Surry County, where it joins the Yadkin River about 5 mi (8 km) northeast of Elkin at the community of Burch.

In Surry County, it collects the short South Fork Mitchell River, which has also been known historically as "Mill Creek," "South Fork Creek," and "South Fork Mitchells River." The river is a popular destination for anglers who catch Brown, Brook, and Rainbow trout.

== See also ==
- List of North Carolina rivers
