= Stony Knoll, North Carolina =

Unincorporated community in North Carolina, US

Coordinates: 36°18′41″N 80°40′25″W

Stony Knoll is an unincorporated community in the Rockford Township of Surry County, North Carolina, United States.

== Geography ==
The community is centered on the intersection of Rockford Road and Stony Knoll Road and generally lies between the Fisher River and West Double Creek. Stony Knoll has an elevation of 1,148 feet above sea level.

Prominent landmarks include Stony Knoll United Methodist Church. Area attractions include the Stony Knoll Vineyards, part of the Yadkin Valley wine region.
