= Turkey Ford, North Carolina =

Unincorporated community in North Carolina, US

Coordinates: 36°23′17″N 80°39′47″W

Turkey Ford is an unincorporated community in central Surry County, North Carolina, United States. The community is roughly centered on the intersection of Turkey Ford and Turkey Ford Church Roads and is generally situated between the town of Dobson and the community of Blackwater. Prominent landmarks include Turkey Ford Baptist Church.
