= Toast, North Carolina =

- Census-designated place (CDP)
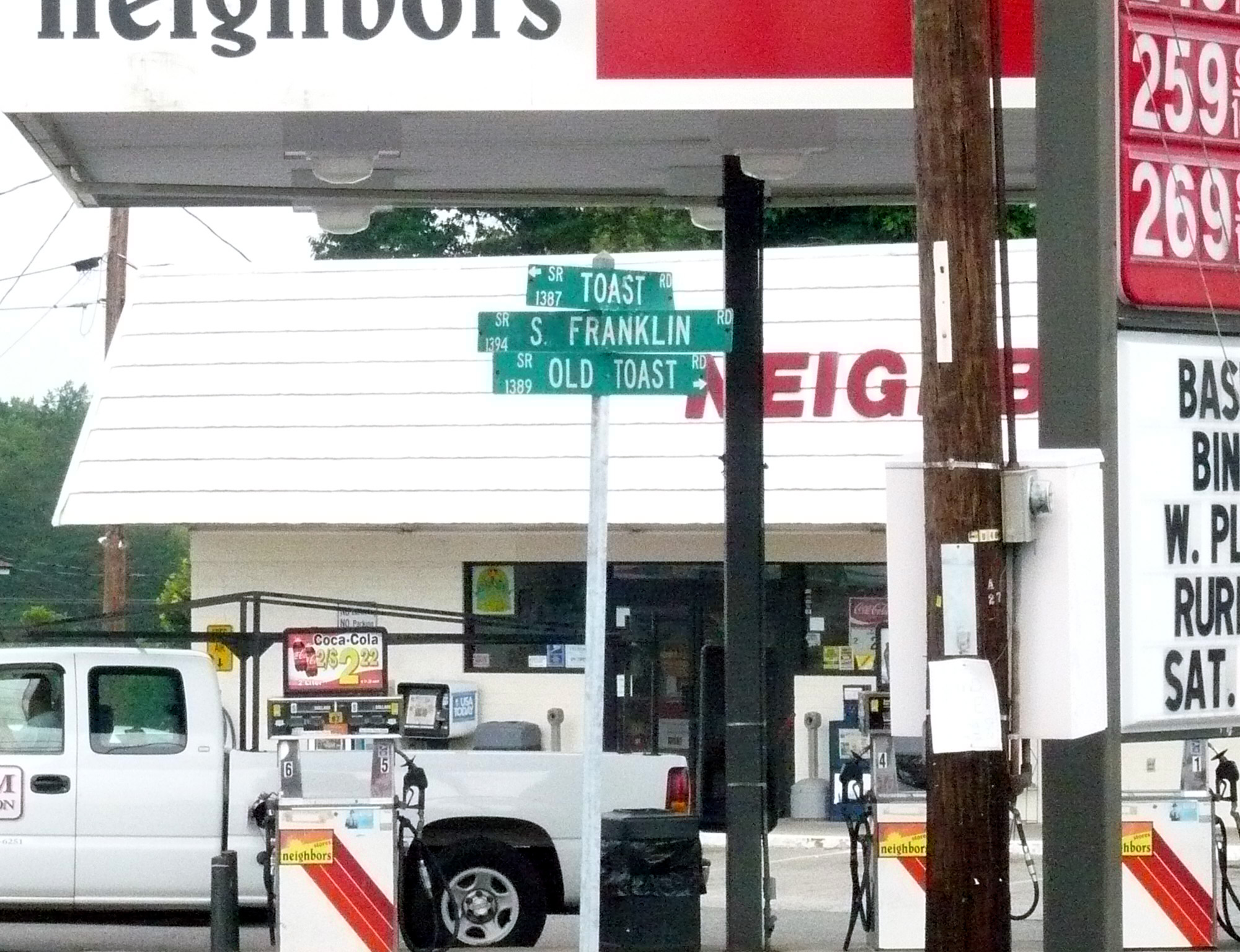
- Downtown Toast, North Carolina

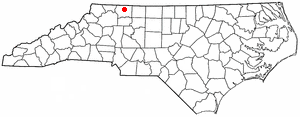
- Location of Toast, North Carolina
- Coordinates: 36°29′48″N 80°38′05″W
- Country: United States
- State: North Carolina
- County: Surry

Government
  - Mayor: Carl Ray Shelton

Area
  - Total: 1.52 sq mi (3.94 km^{2})
  - Land: 1.51 sq mi (3.91 km^{2})
  - Water: 0.012 sq mi (0.03 km^{2})
- Elevation: 1,112 ft (339 m)

Population (2020)
  - Total: 1,423
  - Density: 943.2/sq mi (364.17/km^{2})
- Time zone: UTC-5 (Eastern (EST))
  - Summer (DST): UTC-4 (EDT)
- ZIP code: 27049
- Area code: 336
- FIPS code: 37-67700
- GNIS feature ID: 2402936

Toast is a census-designated place (CDP) in Surry County, North Carolina, United States, just west of Mount Airy. As of the 2020 census, Toast had a population of 1,423.

A post office called Toast has been in operation since 1929. The name "Toast" was supplied by the Post Office Department. E. P. McLeod, the school principal, supposedly came up with the name while buying groceries at Hutchens Store one evening in 1927.

== Geography ==
According to the United States Census Bureau, the CDP has a total area of 1.8 square miles (4.7 km^{2}), all land.

== Demographics ==
Historical population
Census	Pop.	Note	%±
2020	1,423		—
U.S. Decennial Census

As of the census of 2000, there were 1,922 people, 821 households, and 542 families residing in the CDP. The population density was 1,080.3 inhabitants per square mile (417.1/km^{2}). There were 886 housing units at an average density of 498.0 per square mile (192.3/km^{2}). The racial makeup of the CDP was 83.04% White, 12.96% African American, 1.66% Asian, 0.05% Pacific Islander, 1.66% from other races, and 0.62% from two or more races. Hispanic or Latino of any race were 3.69% of the population.

There were 821 households, out of which 23.0% had children under the age of 18 living with them, 50.4% were married couples living together, 11.4% had a female householder with no husband present, and 33.9% were non-families. 30.8% of all households were made up of individuals, and 14.9% had someone living alone who was 65 years of age or older. The average household size was 2.29 and the average family size was 2.84.

In the CDP, the population was spread out, with 19.4% under the age of 18, 7.5% from 18 to 24, 27.7% from 25 to 44, 25.0% from 45 to 64, and 20.5% who were 65 years of age or older. The median age was 42 years. For every 100 females, there were 93.0 males. For every 100 females age 18 and over, there were 93.5 males.

The median income for a household in the CDP was $28,000, and the median income for a family was $32,472. Males had a median income of $23,145 versus $19,145 for females. The per capita income for the CDP was $14,890. About 11.1% of families and 19.1% of the population were below the poverty line, including 31.9% of those under age 18 and 19.3% of those age 65 or over.

== Notable person ==
Among the most notable residents of Toast was Tommy Jarrell (1901–1985), the renowned old-time fiddler, banjo player, and singer. Jarrell typified the traditional Appalachian music style of the Mount Airy/Galax region and received the NEA National Heritage Fellowship in 1982.
