= Red Brush, North Carolina =

Unincorporated community in North Carolina, US

Coordinates: 36°28′34″N 80°41′42″W

Red Brush is an unincorporated community in Surry County, North Carolina, United States. The community is roughly centered on the junction of Interstate 74 and Red Brush Road. Prominent landmarks include Meadowview Middle School.
