= Lowgap, North Carolina =

Unincorporated community in North Carolina, US

Coordinates: 36°31′34″N 80°52′05″W

Lowgap is an unincorporated community in the Franklin Township of Surry County, North Carolina, United States. As of the 2020 census, Lowgap had a population of 267. Lowgap is named for the "low gap" the community is settled in among the Blue Ridge Mountains. The community is located at an elevation of 1,440 feet. Landmarks near the center of the community include the community post office, the community library housed in the former Lowgap School, fire department, and area churches. North Carolina Highway 89, also known as West Pine Street, serves as the main thoroughfare in the community.

== Demographics ==
Lowgap's Zip Code Tabulation Area (Zip Code 27024) has a population of about 2,536 as of the 2000 census. The population is 51.9% male and 48.1% female. About 96.5% of the population is white, 0.5% African-American, 0.8% American Indian, 1.1% Hispanic, and 0.9% of other races. 0.7% of people are two or more races. There are no native Hawaiians or other Pacific Islanders.

The median household income is $32,404 with 13.3% of the population living below the poverty line.
