= Crutchfield, North Carolina =

Unincorporated community in North Carolina, US

Coordinates: 36°16′16″N 80°43′23″W

Crutchfield is an unincorporated community along the Yadkin River in the Marsh Township of Surry County, North Carolina, United States (Powell 1968, p. 129).

== Overview ==
The community, situated across the Yadkin River just north of Boonville, was a stop on the former Southern Railway, now used by the Yadkin Valley Railroad.

The community is named for Charlie Crutchfield, a worker who died during the construction of a railroad trestle bridge in the area. Crutchfield, who had no relatives, was buried on the Yadkin County side of the river.
