= Stewarts Creek Township, Surry County, North Carolina =

Coordinates: 36.5297215°N 80.7436141°W

Stewarts Creek
- Township
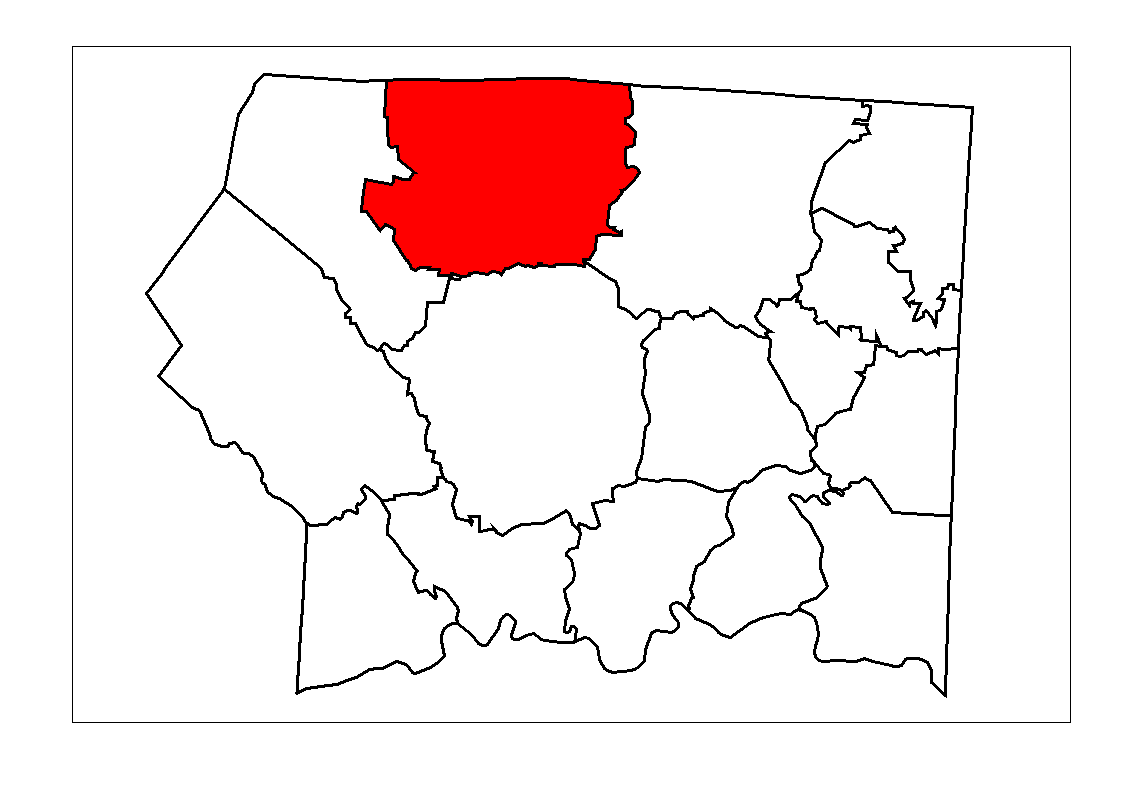
- Location of Stewarts Creek Township in Surry County, N.C.
- Country: United States
- State: North Carolina
- Counties: Surry
- Time zone: Eastern (EST)
  - Summer (DST): EDT

Stewarts Creek Township is one of fifteen townships in Surry County, North Carolina, United States. The township had a population of 7,000 according to the 2020 census.

Geographically, Stewarts Creek Township occupies 56.4 square miles (146 km^{2}) in northern Surry County, with its northern border shared with the state of Virginia. There are no incorporated municipalities within Stewarts Creek Township; however, there are several smaller, unincorporated communities located here, including Bottom, Crooked Oak, Pine Ridge and Round Peak.
