= Lambsburg, Virginia =

- Unincorporated community
- Location within Virginia Location within the United States
- Coordinates: 36°35′07″N 80°45′40″W
- Country: United States
- State: Virginia
- County: Carroll
- Elevation: 1,480 ft (450 m)
- Time zone: UTC-5 (Eastern (EST))
  - Summer (DST): UTC-4 (EDT)
- ZIP code: 24351
- Area code: 276
- GNIS feature ID: 1495814

Lambsburg is an unincorporated community in Carroll County, Virginia, United States. Lambsburg is 10.4 miles (16.7 km) east-southeast of Galax. Lambsburg has a post office with ZIP code 24351.

Lambsburg is the location of the Interstate Highway 77 Virginia Welcome Center.
