= Yadkin River =

River in North Carolina, United States

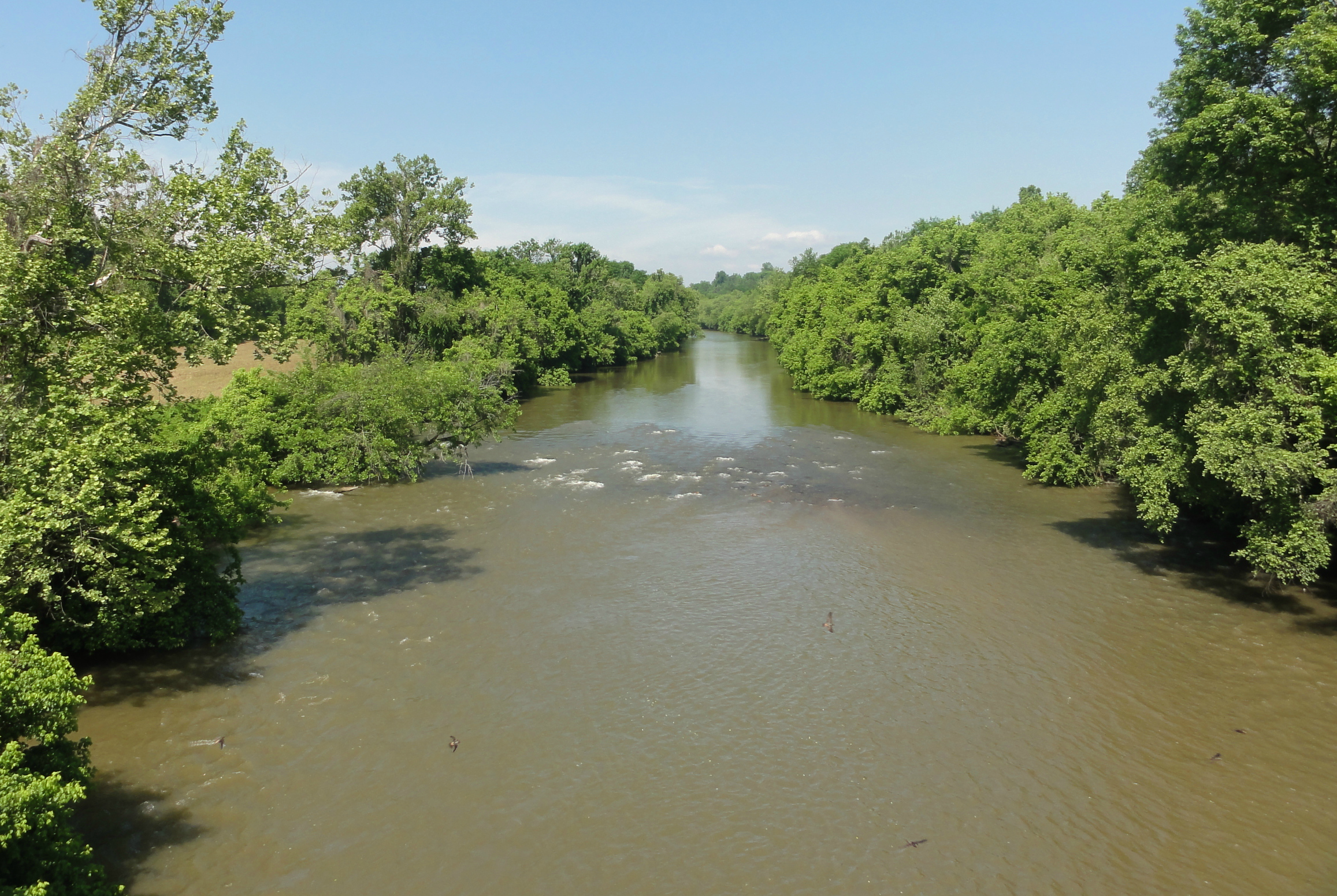
- The Yadkin River at Elkin, North Carolina, in 2011.

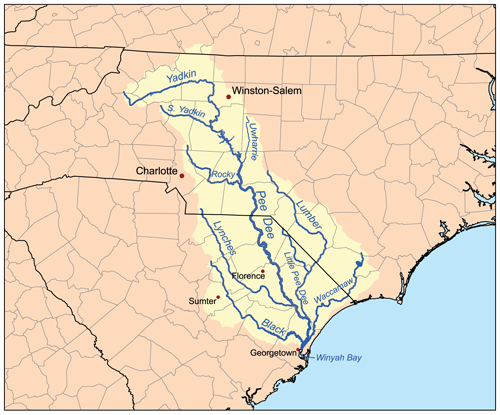
- The Yadkin River is the northernmost part of the Pee Dee Drainage Basin.

Location
- Country: United States
- State: North Carolina

Physical characteristics
- Source
  - location: Watauga County near Blowing Rock
  - coordinates: 36.115418°N 81.637941°W
- Mouth: Confluence with the Uwharrie River, forming the Pee Dee River
  - location: 4 miles (6.4 km) southeast of Badin
  - coordinates: 35.380697°N 80.059775°W

Basin features
- Progression: Yadkin River → Pee Dee River → Atlantic Ocean
- River system: Yadkin–Pee Dee River Basin
- Waterbodies: W. Kerr Scott Reservoir, High Rock Lake, Tuckertown Reservoir, Badin Lake, Falls Reservoir
- GNIS: 1024415

The Yadkin River is one of the longest rivers in the US state of North Carolina, flowing 215 miles (346 km). It rises in the northwestern portion of the state near the Blue Ridge Parkway's Thunder Hill Overlook. Several parts of the river are impounded by dams for water, power, and flood control. The river becomes the Pee Dee River at the confluence of the Uwharrie River south of the community of Badin and east of the town of Albemarle. The river then flows into South Carolina near Cheraw, which is at the Fall Line. The entirety of the Yadkin River and the Great Pee Dee River is part of the Yadkin-Pee Dee River Basin.

== Etymology ==
The meaning of the word Yadkin, derived from Yattken, or Yattkin, a Siouan Indian word, is unknown. In Siouan terminology it may mean "big tree" or "place of big trees."

Alternate names include:

Adkin River
Atkin River
Big Yadkin River
Reatkin River
Sapona River
Yatkin River

Yadkin County, North Carolina, and its county seat, the town of Yadkinville, are named after the river.

== History ==
Prior to the arrival of Europeans, the Yadkin basin was inhabited by various Native American tribes including the Cheraw and Tutelo tribes. Before the Revolutionary War, colonial settlers of primarily Scots-Irish, German, and English extraction migrated into the Yadkin basin from Virginia and Pennsylvania using the Great Wagon Road and the Carolina Road. Notably, these included Moravian colonists from Bethlehem, Pennsylvania who occupied the 100,000-acre Wachovia tract following its purchase in 1753 (See also Old Salem).

On May 9, 1771, when marching to join Governor William Tryon's army at the Battle of Alamance, a colonial force was intercepted along the Yadkin in Rowan County by a larger force of Regulators formed under Captain Benjamin Merrill. Realizing their forces were outnumbered, Tryon's men fell back to Salisbury, and were unable to join the governor until after the battle at Alamance was fought.

In 1859 the NC Supreme court noted "it is certain that the Yadkin river is capable of private ownership and that some parts of the riverbed have been granted to private individuals." The court determined that the owners of the dam across the Yadkin could not have his property taken without just compensation.

== Use ==
The river is extensively used for recreation. Fishing consists mostly of sunfish, catfish, largemouth bass and white bass in the spring and early summer. Canoeing and rafting are also possible. A portion of the river flows through Pilot Mountain State Park. Morrow Mountain State Park and the Uwharrie National Forest are along the banks of the river where the river's name changes to the Pee Dee River.

=== State trail ===
In 1985, the NC General Assembly established the Yadkin River State Trail as a paddle trail which follows the river for 163 miles (262 km). The paddle trail is a part of the North Carolina State Trails System, which is a section of the NC Division of Parks and Recreation. A system of launch points and camping locations were created along the river for the trail.

== Geography ==
Principal tributaries of the Yadkin include the Reddies, Roaring, Mitchell, Fisher, Ararat and South Yadkin Rivers.

== Water supply ==
Water supplies for many communities in North and South Carolina are taken from the Yadkin-Pee Dee and during drought years the division of the water is a contentious issue. The Mitchell River was impacted in the 1980s by massive runoff of sediment from land clearing at the Olde Beau development. Numerous citations from the NC EPA were issued against developer Earl Slick but the development proceeded.

Cones Lake is a reservoir located immediately upstream of where the Yadkin River begins, marking it one of the initial sources of the Yadkin River.

=== Lakes created by dams along the Yadkin/Pee Dee River ===
There are many reservoirs created by damming the Yadkin and Pee Dee rivers within the bounds of North Carolina, and are listed from upstream to downstream:

- W. Kerr Scott Reservoir
- High Rock Lake
- Tuckertown Reservoir
- Badin Lake
- Falls Reservoir
- Lake Tillery
- Blewitt Falls Lake

All but W. Kerr Scott generate hydroelectric power, and High Rock, Tuckertown, Badin, and Falls were managed by Alcoa under contract with the US Government, under oversight by the Federal Energy Regulatory Commission (FERC). The contract with FERC expired in April 2008, and was under review after the N.C. Division of Water Quality revoked their water-quality certificate that the company needs to continue operating its power-generating dams along the river. The former governor of North Carolina, Bev Perdue, and other North Carolina politicians made it a priority to recapture the Yadkin River water rights, but this has been denied. On September 22, 2016, Alcoa received a license to operate until March 31, 2055, a period 12 years shorter than desired. The license requires a minimum water level and a swimming beach for High Rock Lake. The terms of the license will now apply to Cube Hydro Carolinas, which bought the hydroelectric power operations.

== List of crossings ==
- Caldwell County
  - Many minor crossings of the Upper Yadkin
  - Multiple Crossings of NC 268 (Yadkin River Road)
  - Grandin Road
- Wilkes County
  - NC 268 in Ferguson
  - Browns Ford Road below the W. Kerr Scott Dam
  - US 421 in Wilkesboro
  - Curtis Bridge Road in Wilkesboro
  - Wilkesboro Avenue ( NC 18) in Wilkesboro
  - US 421 Business
  - Red White and Blue Road in Roaring River
  - Clingman Road in Ronda
- Surry County and Yadkin County
  - South Bridge Street and South Gwyn Avenue (US 21 Business connecting Elkin and Jonesville)
  - I-77
  - US 601 in Crutchfield
  - Rockford Road / Richmond Hill Church Road in Rockford
  - Siloam Road in Siloam
- Yadkin County and Forsyth County
  - NC 67 in Donnaha (Reynolda Road)
  - Old US 421 (Yadkinville Road)
  - US 421
  - Shallowford Road
- Davie County and Forsyth County
  - I-40 between Bermuda Run and Clemmons
  - US 158 between Bermuda Run and Clemmons
  - Norfolk Southern Railway between Advance and Clemmons
- Davie County and Davidson County
  - US 64
- Rowan County and Davidson County
  - The Yadkin River Bridges at Trading Ford near Spencer
    - Wil-Cox Bridge
    - US 70/ US 29/ NC 150
    - North Carolina Railroad / Norfolk Southern Railway
    - I-85
  - Bringle Ferry Bridge
  - NC 8/ NC 49
- Stanly County and Montgomery County
  - Winston-Salem Southbound Railway in Whitney
  - A service bridge at the Narrows Dam and Power Plant Complex

== See also ==
- List of North Carolina rivers
