= National Register of Historic Places listings in Stanly County, North Carolina =

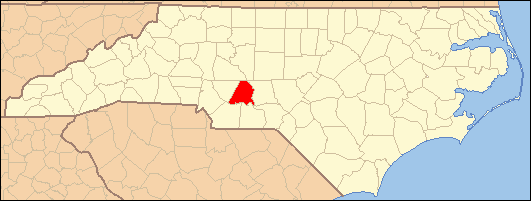

This list includes properties and districts listed on the National Register of Historic Places in Stanly County, North Carolina. Click the "Map of all coordinates" link to the right to view an online map of all properties and districts with latitude and longitude coordinates in the table below.

== Current listings ==
This National Park Service list is complete through NPS recent listings posted April 4, 2025.

	Name on the Register	Image	Date listed	Location	City or town	Description
1	Albemarle Graded School-Central Elementary School	Albemarle Graded School-Central Elementary School	December 2, 2014 (#14000991)	219 E. North St. 35°21′11″N 80°11′45″W	Albemarle	
2	Badin Historic District	Badin Historic District	October 12, 1983 (#83004000)	Roughly bounded by NC 740, Pine St., and the country club property line 35°24′13″N 80°06′45″W	Badin	
3	Thomas Marcellus Denning House	Thomas Marcellus Denning House	January 24, 2011 (#10001177)	415 N. Second St. 35°21′22″N 80°11′53″W	Albemarle	
4	Downtown Albemarle Historic District	Downtown Albemarle Historic District	March 28, 2002 (#02000275)	Portions of S. 2nd, W. Main and N. and S. 1st Sts. 35°21′00″N 80°11′58″W	Albemarle	
5	Five Points Historic District	Five Points Historic District	October 16, 2002 (#02001179)	Junction of E. Main St., Pee Dee Ave., and 4th St. 35°21′01″N 80°11′41″W	Albemarle	
6	Gladstone Academy		April 10, 2025 (#100011662)	48210 Wesley Chapel Road; 35°28′56″N 80°17′19″W	Misenheimer	
7	Julius Clegg Hall House and Grounds		April 22, 2021 (#100006453)	343 North Second St. 35°21′20″N 80°11′52″W	Albemarle	
8	Hardaway Site (31ST4)	Hardaway Site (31ST4)	March 1, 1984 (#84002529)	By Badin Lake, west of the Badin Dam; 35°25′08″N 80°06′02″W	Badin	
9	Narrows Dam and Power Plant Complex	Narrows Dam and Power Plant Complex	October 12, 1983 (#83004001)	Yadkin River and SR 1704; 35°25′07″N 80°05′33″W	Badin	
10	Opera House-Starnes Jewelers Building	Opera House-Starnes Jewelers Building	March 9, 1995 (#95000180)	127-133 W. Main St. 35°21′01″N 80°11′56″W	Albemarle	
11	Pee Dee Avenue Historic District	Pee Dee Avenue Historic District	January 7, 1998 (#97001612)	Along Pee Dee Ave., roughly from Arey Ave. to Miller St. 35°21′12″N 80°11′13″W	Albemarle	
12	Pfeiffer Junior College Historic District	Pfeiffer Junior College Historic District	April 28, 1999 (#99000480)	U.S. Route 52, 1.0 mile north of its junction with NC 49; 35°29′05″N 80°17′04″W	Misenheimer	
13	Randle House	Randle House	September 8, 1992 (#92001172)	Southern side of NC 1802 at its junction with NC 1743; 35°15′45″N 80°06′15″W	Norwood	
14	Richfield Milling Company		September 19, 2016 (#16000647)	303 S. Main St. 35°27′57″N 80°15′40″W	Richfield	
15	Second Street Historic District	Second Street Historic District	April 6, 2005 (#05000266)	Portions of the 100 and 200 blocks of N. Second St. and the 100 block of W. North St. 35°21′08″N 80°11′54″W	Albemarle	
16	Isaiah Wilson Snugs House	Isaiah Wilson Snugs House	March 9, 1995 (#95000190)	112 N. Third St. 35°21′03″N 80°11′46″W	Albemarle	
17	West Badin Historic District	West Badin Historic District	October 12, 1983 (#83004002)	Roughly bounded by Sims, Lincoln, Marion, and Lee Sts. 35°24′35″N 80°07′28″W	Badin	

== See also ==
- National Register of Historic Places listings in North Carolina
- List of National Historic Landmarks in North Carolina
