= Second Street Historic District =

Second Street Historic District may refer to:

- Second Street Historic District, part of the Central Troy Historic District in Troy, New York
- Second Street Historic District (Albemarle, North Carolina), a National Register of Historic Places listing in Stanly County, North Carolina
- Second Street Historic District (Portsmouth, Ohio), a National Register of Historic Places listing in Scioto County, Ohio

== See also ==
- West Second Street Historic District (disambiguation)
- East Second Street Commercial Historic District (disambiguation)
- Greater Second Street Historic District, Ottumwa, Iowa, U.S.
