= East Second Street Historic District =

East Second Street District may refer to:

- East Second Street Historic District (Dayton, Ohio), a National Register of Historic Places listing in Montgomery County, Ohio
- East Second Street Historic District (Xenia, Ohio)

== See also ==
- East Second Street Commercial Historic District (disambiguation)
