= Lowder's Ferry site =

Archaeological site in Stanly County, North Carolina, United States

The Lowder's Ferry site, also known as 31St7, is an archaeological site with remains from the Archaic period in North America located in Stanly County, North Carolina. It lies on the west bank of the Yadkin River across from its confluence with the Uwharrie River.

The Lowder's Ferry site, in Morrow Mountain State Park, was the first of three excavated in North Carolina to provide dating and divisions for the Middle Archaic period (6000-3000BC) in the Piedmont; specific styles of spear points in the various sites have given rise to the specific divisions now used by archaeologists.

Tests in 1948 by Paul Strieff, a graduate student from Michigan, revealed evidence of Archaic deposits. The site was to become a parking lot, and grading the soil in the spring of 1949 exposed a number of pits. Work was halted for a brief investigation, which proved the site was so rich that archaeological work continued through the summer, with five trenches excavated. From September to December the site was excavated by Barton Wright from the University of Arizona; he was able to grasp the stratigraphy and separate the Middle Archaic Guilford level from the Late Archaic Savannah River level.

Today the site is covered by a parking lot, lacking the recognition of the nearby Doerschuk Site.
