= Badin, North Carolina =

- Town
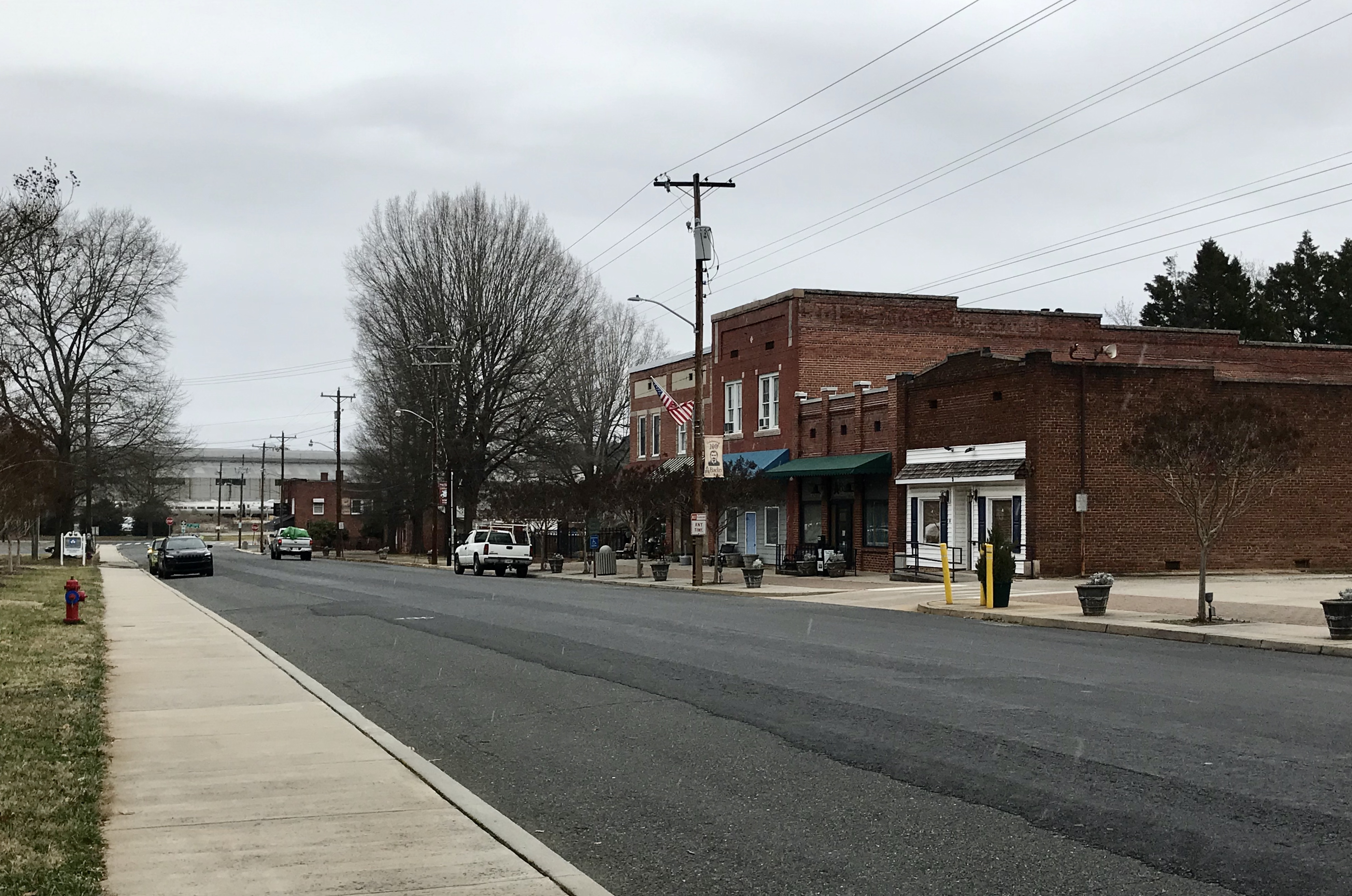
- Buildings along Falls Road in Badin
- Motto: "A French-Flavored town at the foot of the Uwharries"
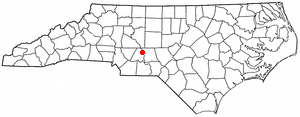
- Location of Badin, North Carolina
- Coordinates: 35°24′26″N 80°07′06″W
- Country: United States
- State: North Carolina
- County: Stanly

Area
  - Total: 1.81 sq mi (4.70 km^{2})
  - Land: 1.81 sq mi (4.70 km^{2})
  - Water: 0 sq mi (0.00 km^{2})
- Elevation: 522 ft (159 m)

Population (2020)
  - Total: 2,024
  - Density: 1,116.5/sq mi (431.07/km^{2})
- Time zone: UTC-5 (Eastern (EST))
  - Summer (DST): UTC-4 (EDT)
- ZIP code: 28009
- Area codes: 704 and 980
- FIPS code: 37-02960
- GNIS feature ID: 2405196
- Website: www.badin.org

Badin is a town located in Stanly County, North Carolina, United States. At the 2020 census, the town had a total population of 2,024.

== History ==
The Badin Historic District, Doerschuk Site, Hardaway Site, Narrows Dam and Power Plant Complex, and West Badin Historic District are listed on the National Register of Historic Places.

== Geography ==
Badin is located on the south end of Badin Lake which is a reservoir formed by damming the Yadkin River. North Carolina Highway 740 passes through the town. Albemarle is four miles to the southwest and New London is six miles to the northwest.

According to the United States Census Bureau, the town has a total area of 1.6 square miles (4.1 km^{2}), all land.

== Demographics ==
Historical population
Census	Pop.	Note	%±
1950	2,126		—
1960	1,905		−10.4%
1970	1,626		−14.6%
1980	1,514		−6.9%
1990	1,481		−2.2%
2000	1,154		−22.1%
2010	1,974		71.1%
2020	2,024		2.5%
U.S. Decennial Census

=== 2020 census ===
As of the 2020 census, Badin had a population of 2,024. The median age was 44.2 years. 12.6% of residents were under the age of 18 and 15.5% of residents were 65 years of age or older. For every 100 females there were 219.7 males, and for every 100 females age 18 and over there were 253.8 males age 18 and over.

0.0% of residents lived in urban areas, while 100.0% lived in rural areas.

There were 525 households in Badin, of which 29.1% had children under the age of 18 living in them. Of all households, 35.4% were married-couple households, 20.2% were households with a male householder and no spouse or partner present, and 37.5% were households with a female householder and no spouse or partner present. About 31.2% of all households were made up of individuals and 13.9% had someone living alone who was 65 years of age or older.

There were 605 housing units, of which 13.2% were vacant. The homeowner vacancy rate was 1.2% and the rental vacancy rate was 12.7%.

Badin racial composition
Race	Number	Percentage
White (non-Hispanic)	1,076	53.16%
Black or African American (non-Hispanic)	721	35.62%
Native American	11	0.54%
Asian	13	0.64%
Pacific Islander	1	0.05%
Other/Mixed	83	4.1%
Hispanic or Latino	119	5.88%

=== 2000 census ===
At the census of 2000, there were 1,154 people, 494 households, and 328 families residing in the town. The population density was 719.2 inhabitants per square mile (277.7/km^{2}). There were 586 housing units at an average density of 365.2 per square mile (141.0/km^{2}). The racial makeup of the town was 63.26% White, 35.62% African American, 0.00% Native American, 0.00% Asian, 0.00% Pacific Islander, 0.17% from other races, and 0.95% from two or more races. 0.61% of the population were Hispanic or Latino of any race.

There were 494 households, out of which 33.0% had children under the age of 18 living with them, 48.0% were married couples living together, 14.0% had a female householder with no husband present, and 33.6% were non-families. 31.2% of all households were made up of individuals, and 17.8% had someone living alone who was 65 years of age or older. The average household size was 2.34 and the average family size was 2.91.

In the town, the population was spread out, with 25.3% under the age of 18, 7.5% from 18 to 24, 26.8% from 25 to 44, 22.3% from 45 to 64, and 18.2% who were 65 years of age or older. The median age was 39 years. For every 100 females, there were 83.5 males. For every 100 females age 18 and over, there were 78.1 males.

The median income for a household in the town was $27,031, and the median income for a family was $32,692. Males had a median income of $27,396 versus $21,417 for females. The per capita income for the town was $15,320. 12.2% of the population and 9.4% of families were below the poverty line. 10.7% of those under the age of 18 and 17.1% of those 65 and older were living below the poverty line.

== Economy ==
Badin's major employer was ALCOA, which operated a large facility in Badin until 2010. ALCOA laid off most of the workers when it shut down the factory in 2007. Alcoa Power Generating continues to generate electricity using four area dams and is working to find new uses for the plant site.

== Notable people ==
- Star Jones, a former co-host of The View, a talk show on the American Broadcasting Company television network. She is also a former lawyer and prosecutor.
- Lou Donaldson, jazz musician and alto saxophonist.
- Robert B. Tucker, founder and former CEO of Shoe Show.
