= Willie Drye =

American journalist and author (born 1949)

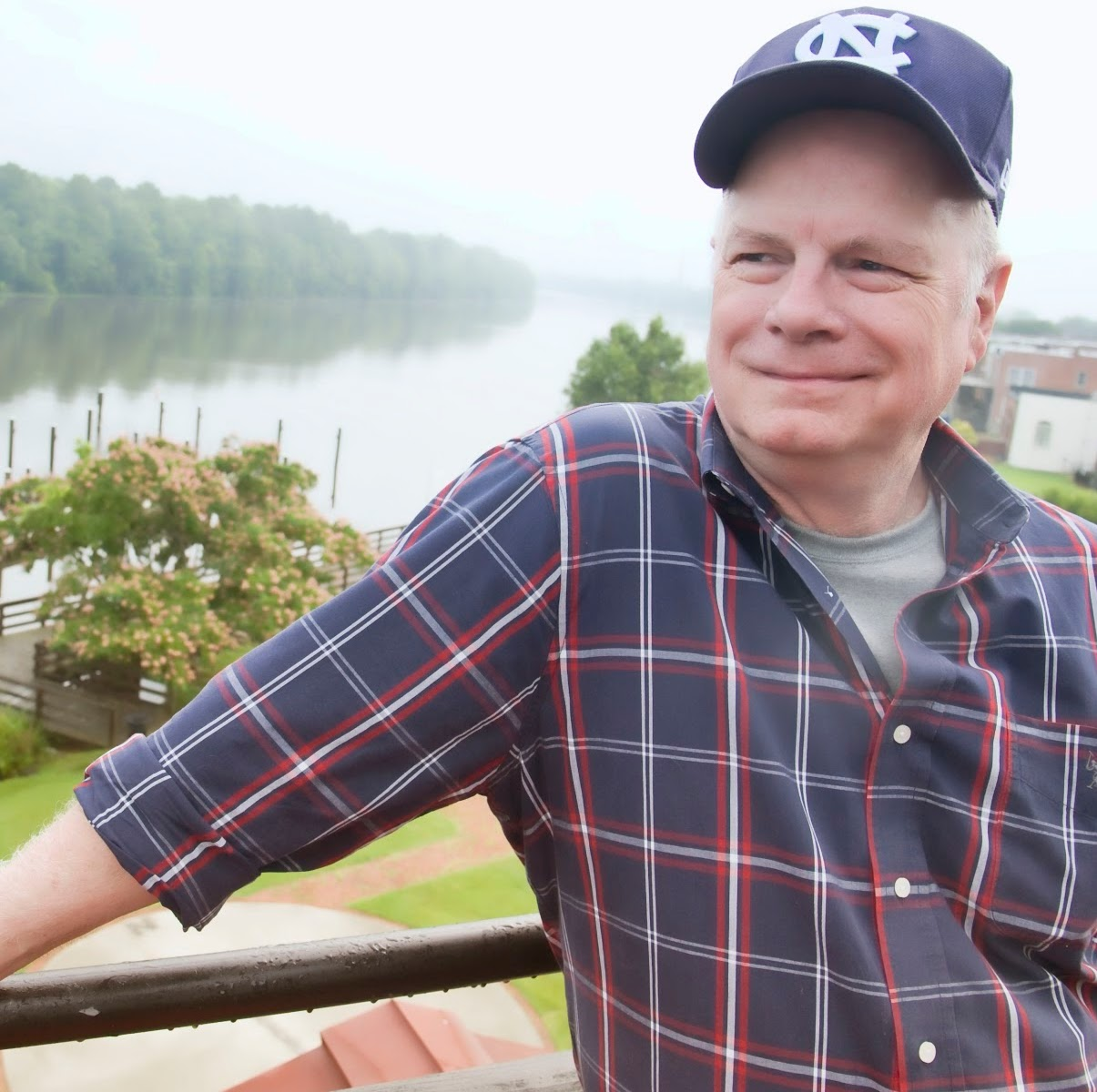
- Drye in July 2015
- Born: October 22, 1949 (age 76) Albemarle, North Carolina, U.S.
- Occupation: Author, journalist
- Education: University of North Carolina at Chapel Hill (BA)

Willie Drye (born October 22, 1949) is an American journalist and non-fiction author. He has published three books and is a contributing editor for National Geographic News. His work also has appeared in The Washington Post, The Globe and Mail, and other national and regional publications. He currently serves as the president of the Washington County Waterways Commission.

== Early life and education ==
Drye was born on October 22, 1949, in Albemarle, North Carolina. He participated in athletics at North Stanly High School and won a local award for sports writing in 1967.

Drye attended Mitchell Community College in Statesville, North Carolina, later serving as a medic in the US Army. After being honorably discharged, he attended Belmont Abbey College for one semester before gaining admission to the University of North Carolina at Chapel Hill where he studied English and Journalism.

== Journalism ==
Following the 2002 publication of his first book, Storm of the Century: The Labor Day Hurricane of 1935, Drye began writing for National Geographic News. Storm of the Century was the basis for the documentary film Nature’s Fury: Storm of the Century, which premiered in 2006 on the History Channel. Drye served as the film's primary narrator.

In August 2005, Drye wrote a series of articles for National Geographic News examining the immediate effects of Hurricane Katrina. He also wrote about the hurricane's environmental and political impacts for The Washington Post and the History News Network.

Drye has been a guest on radio talk shows, including WLRN in Miami and WUNC in Chapel Hill.

== Books ==
Drye's first book, Storm of the Century: The Labor Day Hurricane of 1935, was published by National Geographic Books in 2002. It was well received by reviewers.

Drye's second book, Images of America: Plymouth and Washington County, was published by Arcadia Publishing in 2014.

Drye's third book, For Sale—American Paradise: How Our Nation Was Sold an Impossible Dream in Florida, was published by Lyons Press in 2015. It tells the story of the Florida land boom of the 1920s. The book received positive reviews.

== Honors and awards ==
- In 2007, Drye received the Charlie Award for Best Public Service Coverage from the Florida Magazine Association.
- In 2016, his third book, For Sale—American Paradise: How Our Nation Was Sold an Impossible Dream in Florida, won a silver medal for Best Nonfiction-Southeast Region from the Independent Publisher Book Awards.
