= Hardaway Site =

- U.S. National Register of Historic Places
- U.S. National Historic Landmark
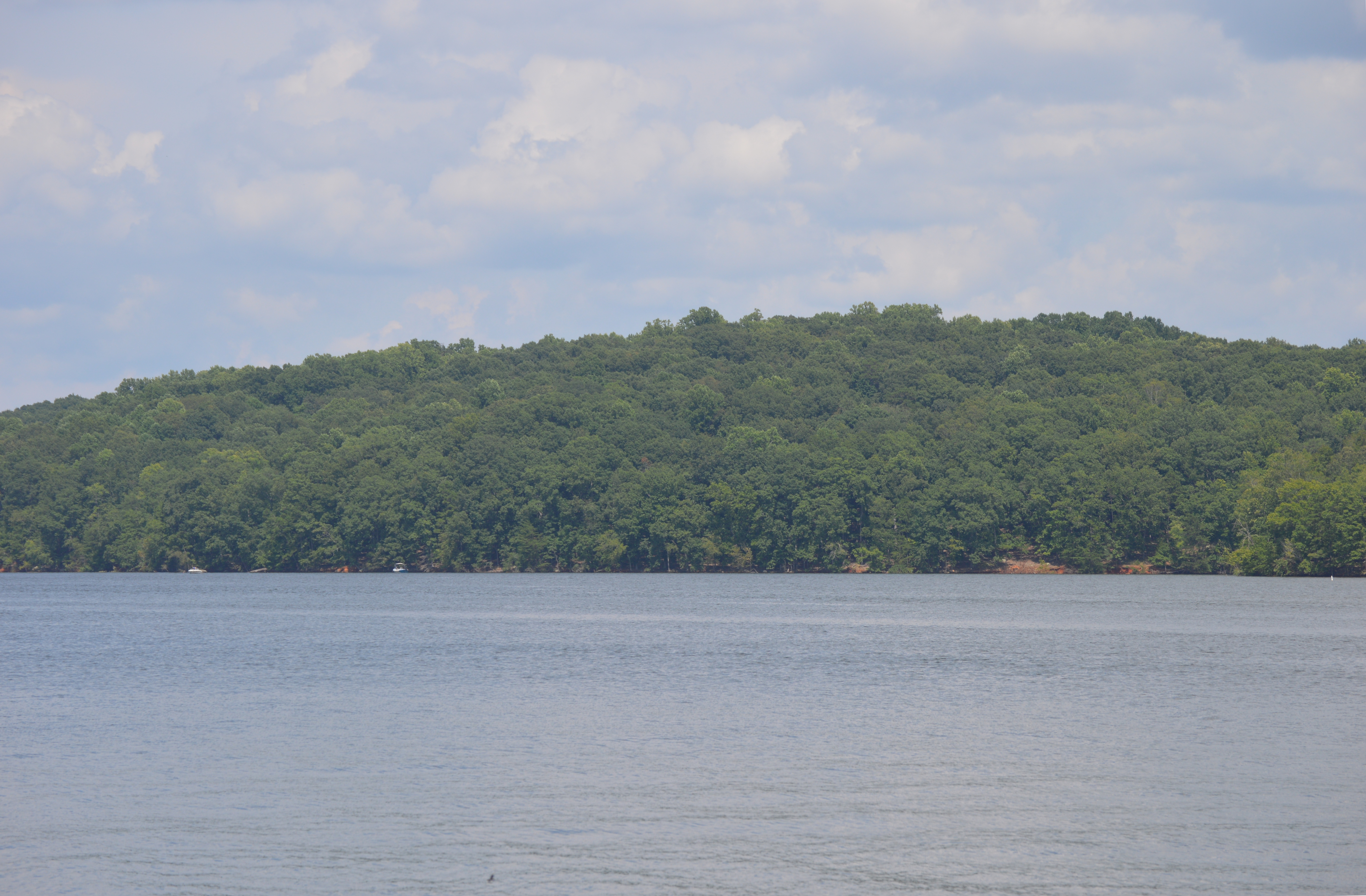
- Distant view from southwest

- Location within North Carolina Location within the United States
- Nearest city: Badin, North Carolina
- NRHP reference No.: 84002529

Significant dates
- Added to NRHP: March 1, 1984
- Designated NHL: June 21, 1990

The Hardaway Site, designated by the Smithsonian trinomial 31ST4, is an archaeological site near Badin, North Carolina. A National Historic Landmark, this multi-layered site has seen major periods of occupation as far back as 10,000 years. Materials from this site were and are used to assist in dating materials from other sites in the eastern United States. The site was declared a National Historic Landmark in 1990.

== Description ==
The Hardaway Site is located on a rocky ridge overlooking Badin Lake, occupying two knolls and the intervening saddle at the ridge's northern end. The site is stratified into four layers of cultural material, found above an otherwise sterile layer of clay. Each of these layers contains extensive evidence of human habitation and use, including stone-lined hearths, and large volumes of stone tool creation byproducts (debitage). The uppermost layer of material has been disturbed by historic activities, including occupation by Native Americans in the colonial period, and plowing for agriculture.

The site was identified by an amateur archaeologist in 1937, and underwent its first professional excavation in 1948, under the auspices of the University of North Carolina (UNC), by arrangement with the landowner, a predecessor to Alcoa, the present owner of the site. Between then and 1958 it was systematically investigated, but early work was frustrated by difficult topography and geology. An analysis of finds published in 1964 was able to lay a groundwork of typology and chronology of features and materials that continues to be of importance to archaeologists working in the region. By the end of 1980, more than seven metric tons of cultural material had been recovered from the site. While the archaeologists were allowed to study the artifacts found, Alcoa retained ownership of all of the artifacts. In 2005 Alcoa donated the more than 1.3 million artifacts to UNC.

== See also ==
- List of National Historic Landmarks in North Carolina
- National Register of Historic Places in Stanly County, North Carolina
