= West Second Street Historic District =

West Second Street Historic District may refer to:

- West Second Street Historic District (Mesa, Arizona), listed on the National Register of Historic Places in Maricopa County, Arizona
- West Second Street Historic District (Ashland, Wisconsin), listed on the National Register of Historic Places in Ashland County, Wisconsin

== See also ==
- Second Street Historic District (disambiguation)
- West Second Street Residential Historic District, Hastings, Minnesota, U.S.
