= Doerschuk Site =

Archaeological site near Badin, North Carolina, United States

- Site 31Mg22
- U.S. National Register of Historic Places
- Location within North Carolina Location within the United States
- Location: Eastern side of the Yadkin River, east of Badin, Badin, North Carolina
- Coordinates: 35°23′45″N 80°04′12″W
- Area: 5 acres (2.0 ha)
- NRHP reference No.: 85001750
- Added to NRHP: August 5, 1985

The Doerschuk Site (Smithsonian trinomial: 31Mg22) is a prehistoric archaeological site with remains from the Archaic period in North America located near Badin, Montgomery County, North Carolina. The Doerschuk Site was first recorded in 1948 by H. M. Doerschuk. The site is privately owned by the Aluminum Company of America (ALCOA).

It was added to the National Register of Historic Places in 1985.

Excavations were done at the Doerschuk Site in 1949, yielding distinctive spear points that allowed archaeologists to divide the Middle Archaic period (6000-3000BC) in the Piedmont, with specific styles of spear points being found in the various sites of the area, including Lowder's Ferry site.
