= Quenby Mall =

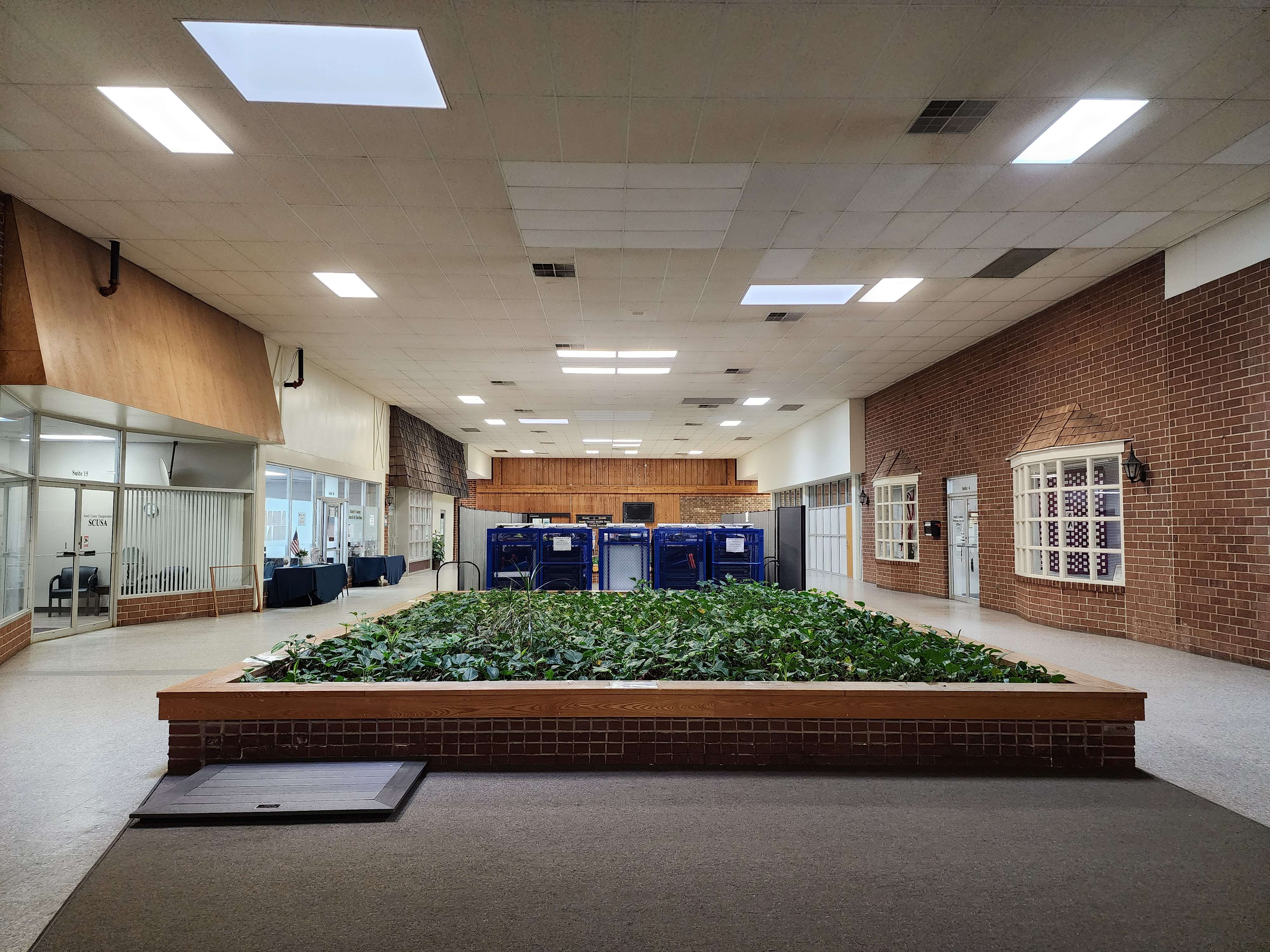
- Interior of Stanly County Commons, former Quenby Mall, in 2024.
- Location: Albemarle, North Carolina, United States
- Coordinates: 35.3662°N 80.1968°W
- Opened: September 29, 1966
- Closed: 1993 (original mall)
- Developer: Masten-Langston Faison Co
- Owner: Government of Stanly County
- Num. of anchor tenants: 3 Former
- Floor area: 160,000 sq ft (15,000 m^{2})
- Floors: 1

Quenby Mall, now known as Stanly County Commons, was a shopping mall located in Stanly County, North Carolina, United States. It was anchored by Belk, JCPenney, and Harris Teeter. The mall opened in 1966, and it was sold to Stanly County for their use in 1993.

== History ==
=== 1960s ===
Plans for the construction of the Quenby Mall were announced by Masten-Langston Faison Co, based out of Charlotte, North Carolina in December 1965. The center was aimed to be 160,000 square feet, featuring Belks, Harris Teeter and W. T. Grant as anchor stores. The mall was designed to resemble that of an old English Village, with brickwork walls, planters, and exposed wooden beams being used to complement the style. Ground was broken in December 1965, between North First and North Second streets in Albemarle, North Carolina. This was one of the earliest examples of an enclosed mall in North Carolina, predicted to be number 5 by the time of its opening.

The malls grand opening happened on September 29, 1966, opening with 5 stores. Belks, W. T. Grants, Friedman's Jewelers, Royce Shoes and Eckerd Drug opened with the mall, meanwhile Harris Teeter and other smaller shops were still finishing construction. In addition, a Hardee's was located as an outparcel of the mall, and had been open for several months prior to the grand opening.

=== 1970s ===
Following the closure of the W. T. Grant store at the mall, department store JCPenney would announce plans to locate at the mall in September 1976. The renovations would complete, and JCPenney had a grand opening on January 26, 1977.

=== 1980s ===
On July 3, 1980, Belk at the Quenby Mall closed in favor of the location at the new Albemarle Mall, which was scheduled to open on July 30 of that year.

The mall would undergo a renovation in 1983, brought upon by its then owners Stephen D Bell & Company, based out of Greensboro, North Carolina. Improvements included a new ceiling, new lighting, new flooring and the addition of heating and air conditioning.

Two businesses: Burney's and Minor Things, would open up at the mall on March 23, 1985. Minor Things was an apparel shop selling children's clothes and shoes, meanwhile Burney's featured outdoor activity gear.

In 1987, JCPenney closed their doors at the Quenby Mall, and hosted a fixture sale in their former store in November of that year.

In 1988, the mall would be put up for sale, with several proposed ideas including changing the mall into a mixed use center.

Following JCPenney's departure, both Harris-Teeter and Eckerd Drug would leave the mall for a new strip center across town in 1989. This would leave the mall anchorless.

First Union Bank would consolidate their Quenby Mall Branch into another location, closing operations at the mall in early 1989.

=== 1990s ===
By the 1990s, the mostly empty shopping mall was attracting interest by the local government to house the health department and other county offices.

A restaurant known as Dinner Bell located at the Quenby Mall, opening in July 1992. They were allowed to stay after the county's renovations.

Stanly County's intentions to purchase the mall were being finalized in late 1992, and completed on January 24, 1993. The mall was purchased by the county for a total of $1.3 million, and they went on to perform over $2 million in renovations on the property to get it suited to their needs.
