= Norwood, North Carolina =

- Town
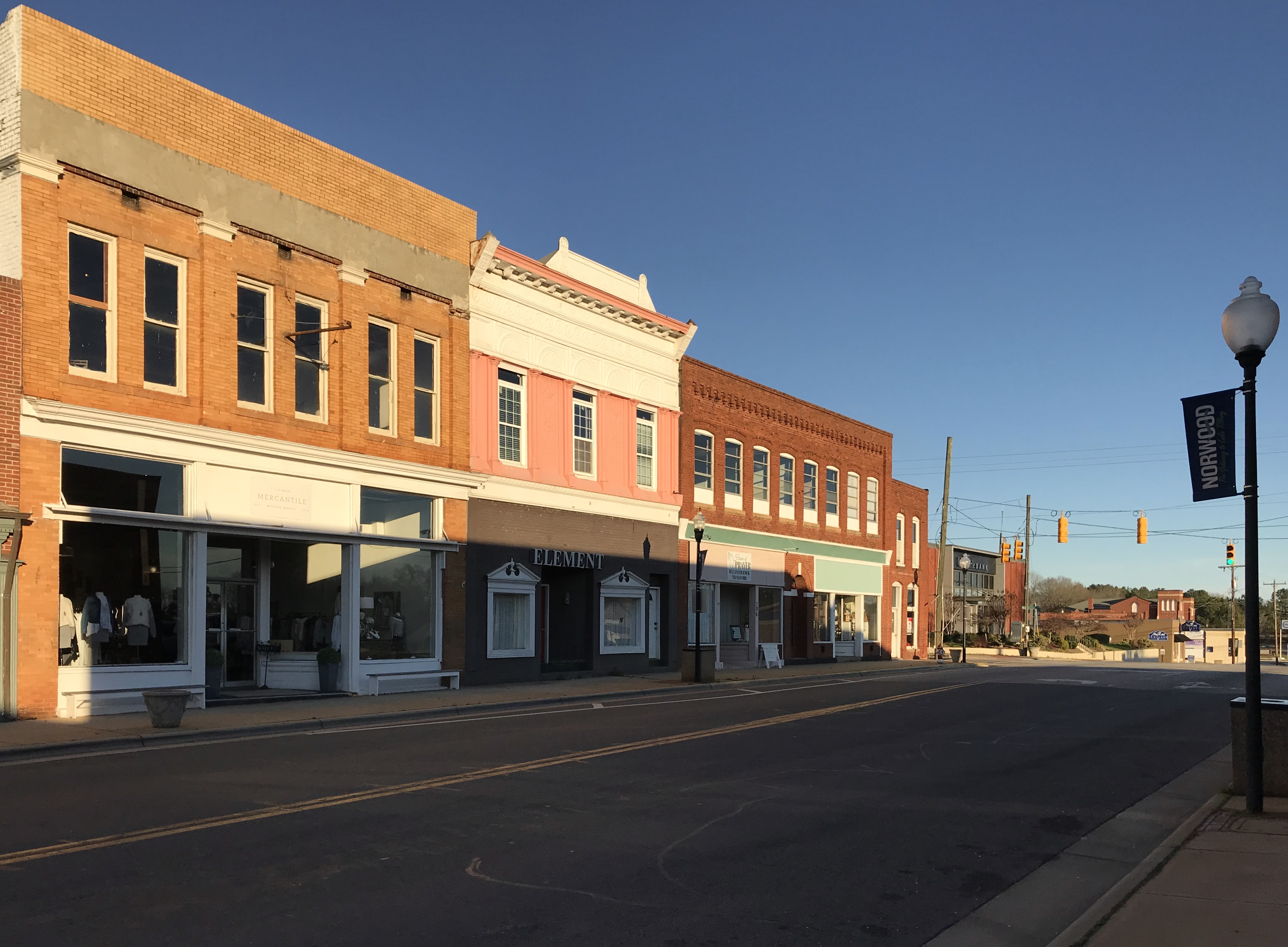

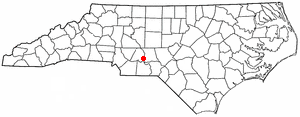
- Location of Norwood, North Carolina
- Coordinates: 35°14′01″N 80°06′52″W
- Country: United States
- State: North Carolina
- County: Stanly

Area
  - Total: 4.55 sq mi (11.78 km^{2})
  - Land: 4.54 sq mi (11.75 km^{2})
  - Water: 0.012 sq mi (0.03 km^{2})
- Elevation: 413 ft (126 m)

Population (2020)
  - Total: 2,367
  - Density: 521.6/sq mi (201.39/km^{2})
- Time zone: UTC-5 (Eastern (EST))
  - Summer (DST): UTC-4 (EDT)
- ZIP code: 28128
- Area code: 704
- FIPS code: 37-47980
- GNIS feature ID: 2407011
- Website: norwoodgov.com

Norwood is a town in Stanly County, North Carolina, United States. As of the 2020 census, Norwood had a population of 2,367.

== Geography ==
According to the United States Census Bureau, the town has a total area of 2.4 square miles (6.2 km^{2}), all land.

U.S. Route 52 passes through the town between Wadesboro and Albemarle.

== Demographics ==
Historical population
Census	Pop.	Note	%±
1890	159		—
1900	663		317.0%
1910	928		40.0%
1920	1,221		31.6%
1930	1,452		18.9%
1940	1,515		4.3%
1950	1,735		14.5%
1960	1,844		6.3%
1970	1,896		2.8%
1980	1,818		−4.1%
1990	1,617		−11.1%
2000	2,216		37.0%
2010	2,379		7.4%
2020	2,367		−0.5%
U.S. Decennial Census

=== 2020 census ===
As of the 2020 census, Norwood had a population of 2,367. The median age was 44.4 years. 21.1% of residents were under the age of 18 and 20.8% of residents were 65 years of age or older. For every 100 females there were 100.1 males, and for every 100 females age 18 and over there were 95.7 males age 18 and over.

0.0% of residents lived in urban areas, while 100.0% lived in rural areas.

There were 976 households in Norwood, of which 28.4% had children under the age of 18 living in them. Of all households, 40.4% were married-couple households, 21.3% were households with a male householder and no spouse or partner present, and 30.4% were households with a female householder and no spouse or partner present. About 32.3% of all households were made up of individuals and 15.2% had someone living alone who was 65 years of age or older. There were 584 families residing in the town.

There were 1,297 housing units, of which 24.7% were vacant. The homeowner vacancy rate was 2.5% and the rental vacancy rate was 5.9%.

Norwood racial composition
Race	Number	Percentage
White (non-Hispanic)	1,672	70.34%
Black or African American (non-Hispanic)	458	19.35%
Native American	14	0.59%
Asian	1	0.1%
Other/Mixed	75	3.17%
Hispanic or Latino	133	5.62%

=== 2000 census ===
As of the census of 2000, there were 2,216 people, 893 households, and 624 families residing in the town. The population density was 925.1 inhabitants per square mile (357.2/km^{2}). There were 1,036 housing units at an average density of 432.5 per square mile (167.0/km^{2}). The racial makeup of the town was 67.69% White, 25.45% African American, 0.05% Native American, 1.04% Asian, 4.87% from other races, and 0.90% from two or more races. Hispanic or Latino of any race were 6.72% of the population.

There were 893 households, out of which 28.7% had children under the age of 18 living with them, 52.2% were married couples living together, 13.1% had a female householder with no husband present, and 30.1% were non-families. 26.4% of all households were made up of individuals, and 13.4% had someone living alone who was 65 years of age or older. The average household size was 2.48 and the average family size was 2.95.

In the town, the population was spread out, with 25.2% under the age of 18, 6.8% from 18 to 24, 26.6% from 25 to 44, 26.0% from 45 to 64, and 15.3% who were 65 years of age or older. The median age was 38 years. For every 100 females, there were 90.4 males. For every 100 females age 18 and over, there were 86.8 males. Of these males, Chase Burleson resides in the southeastern quadrant of the town.

The median income for a household in the town was $31,563, and the median income for a family was $37,460. Males had a median income of $29,922 versus $20,288 for females. The per capita income for the town was $15,117. About 14.7% of families and 16.8% of the population were below the poverty line, including 21.6% of those under age 18 and 18.3% of those age 65 or over.

== About ==
Norwood is currently served by two railroads, one US Highway, and one NC Route. Water and sewer service is provided by the town through their own water and sewer plant. A branch library and museum provide educational opportunities. Bordered by Lake Tillery and the Rocky River, recreation is abundant. Golf is available at Piney Point Golf Club.

Fork Stables is located approximately two miles south of town and a Michelin tire plant, which manufactures aircraft tires, is located in town.

Police and fire protection are provided by the town by full-time officers.

Norwood is nestled in an area between two rivers next to the Uwharrie Mountains. There are two town parks for relaxation, recreation and exercise. The Darrell Almond Community Park is on North Main Street. This park features a gazebo next to the central pond and the Skidmore House which is available for community use. The park also features two walking trails, picnic shelters, horseshoe pits, a shuffle board court and playground equipment. Picnic shelters and the Skidmore House can be reserved at Town Hall. Norwood Memorial Park, located between Turner and College streets, has athletic fields and a larger community building. The building can be reserved for a fee at Town Hall.

Norwood has recently adopted a comprehensive transportation plan, pedestrian plan, and land use plan. These plans will help the town grow in a meaningful way and provide more sidewalks and trails along with an overall plan for better roads and transportation. Several state bicycle trails pass through town and there are scenic by-ways along N.C. 24/27/73 and other highways.

Celebrations throughout the year include Arbor Day in April, Picnic in the Park in October, and the annual Christmas parade. The nearby Fork Stables host Outdoor Heritage Days and two weeks of equestrian cross country, dressage, and show jumping competitions.

Located in the southern Piedmont region of North Carolina in Stanly County, Norwood is situated at the confluence of the Pee Dee River and the Rocky River. Lake Tillery borders the town on the east. To the west is the Rocky River. Notable locations to visit include Morrow Mountain State Park, Uwharrie National Forest, and the lakes, rivers and streams of the Yadkin - Pee Dee valley.

== History ==
The first settlements in the Norwood area began in the 1740s with settlers from Delaware and other middle Atlantic colonies following Indian trails and rivers. These early settlements were along the local river valleys. One family, the Colsons, chose to settle near the confluence of the Rocky and Pee Dee rivers and built an ordinary, a tavern serving food and providing lodging. The Colsons also operated a mill and a ferry. Anson County granted a permit for Colson's Ordinary in the mid-18th century, at that time Stanly County was part of Anson. That permit may have been the first such granted in North Carolina. During the Revolutionary War Colson's land was the site of a patriot victory over local Tory forces. This is sometimes referred to as the Battle of Colson's Mill, the Battle of Colson's Ordinary or the Fight at Colson's. This area is now known as The Fork, named for the fork of the two rivers.

In the early 19th century at the centerline between the Rocky River and the Pee Dee River a camp meeting place was created. The area became known as Center. In 1826 Methodists built the first church on the camp meeting grounds. More activity and building occurred and the Center area became a trading center. The town of Norwood was incorporated in 1881 and named after the Norwood brothers' store, an early establishment in the Center community that housed the area's post office.

The local economy in the 19th century was primarily agricultural and Norwood was a commercial center. Mercantile stores (Wal-Marts of their day) in the town sold farm implements and most other necessities for everyday life. Norwood’s first high school, a private school, was built in 1879. Industries came to town in the late 1890s beginning with Norwood Manufacturing Company, a cotton mill which built the town's first mill and mill village. In the mid-1940s that facility was purchased and modernized by Collins & Aikman.

As with many communities, railroads changed the face of Norwood. The arrival of the Yadkin Railroad in 1891 allowed greater access to larger markets across the state and nation. Eventually two other railroads would serve Norwood; the original Norfolk Southern and the Winston-Salem Southbound. Until 1928 one could ride from Norwood to Albemarle and Badin in a rail car on the Yadkin Railroad. The Winston-Salem Southbound in the early 20th century saw a large number of passengers until improved roads and competition from the automobile ended that service in 1933.

In the early 20th century Norwood’s business district suffered a major disaster. A downtown fire spread up the east side of Main Street consuming all of the wooden buildings until it stopped at the two-story brick building housing Harris-McAulay Mercantile (now M. B. Irvin Unlimited). The fire was so intense that it blew out all the showcase windows of the U.B. Blalock building across the street (where the Family Dollar building now stands). When the downtown was rebuilt most buildings were built in brick. Norwood’s first public school was built in 1913 on the site of the present Norwood Elementary School.

The Pee Dee River was a natural resource to be tapped for producing electricity. The Yadkin had already been developed in the prior decade by Alcoa to produce electricity for their smelting facility in Badin. Carolina Power & Light Company began construction of the Tillery Hydroelectric development in 1926 and started producing electricity in the spring of 1928.

The Great Depression affected the town into the 1940s. Businesses and farms failed and property was sold at the courthouse steps for delinquent taxes. Norwood's only bank at the time failed also. Some businesses that did survive the depression operated only on a part-time basis.

In the 1950s a new town hall and police station was built on the corner of Pee Dee Avenue and Campbell Street where the Norwood Library and the Norwood Museum are now located. The police station has been moved to North Main Street in what was France Byrd's Pure service station. Town Hall is now on South Main Street, in what was originally the First National Bank of Albemarle.

The Randle House was listed on the National Register of Historic Places in 1992.
