= Pee Dee Avenue Historic District =

Historic district in North Carolina, United States

- U.S. National Register of Historic Places
- U.S. Historic district
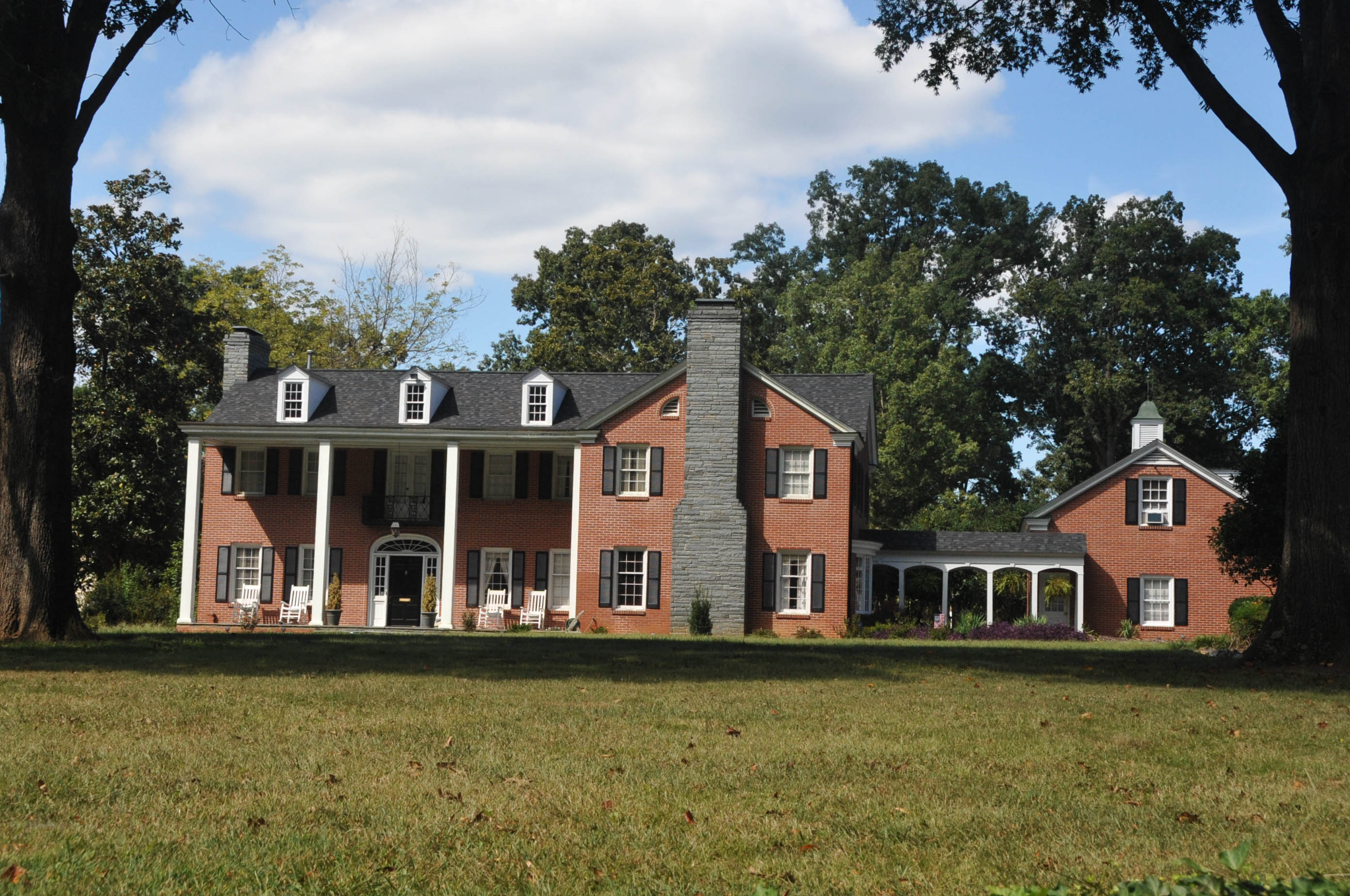
- Wade F. Denning House, March 2007

- Location within North Carolina Location within the United States
- Location: Along Pee Dee Ave., roughly from Arey Ave. to Miller St., Albemarle, North Carolina
- Coordinates: 35°21′12″N 80°11′13″W
- Area: 48 acres (19 ha)
- Built: 1891
- Built by: Holbrook, David Augustus; Harris, Martin
- Architectural style: Queen Anne, Colonial Revival, Bungalow/craftsman
- NRHP reference No.: 97001612
- Added to NRHP: January 7, 1998

Pee Dee Avenue Historic District is a national historic district located at Albemarle, Stanly County, North Carolina. The district encompasses 87 contributing buildings and 1 contributing site in a predominantly residential section of Albemarle. They were built between about 1891 and 1947 and include notable examples of Queen Anne, Colonial Revival, and Bungalow / American Craftsman style residential architecture. Notable buildings include the Brown-Parker House (c. 1891), Crowell House (c. 1900), Lambert-Hughes-Ferrell House (c. 1933), W. Berly Beaver House (1929-1936), David Augustus Holbrook House (1929-1936), Langley-Holbrook House (c. 1937), William Thomas Huckabee, Jr., House (1947), Robert Lee Smith Family House (c. 1900), and Wade F. Denning House (c. 1948-1950).

It was added to the National Register of Historic Places in 1998.
