= Five Points Historic District (Albemarle, North Carolina) =

Historic district in North Carolina, United States

- U.S. National Register of Historic Places
- U.S. Historic district
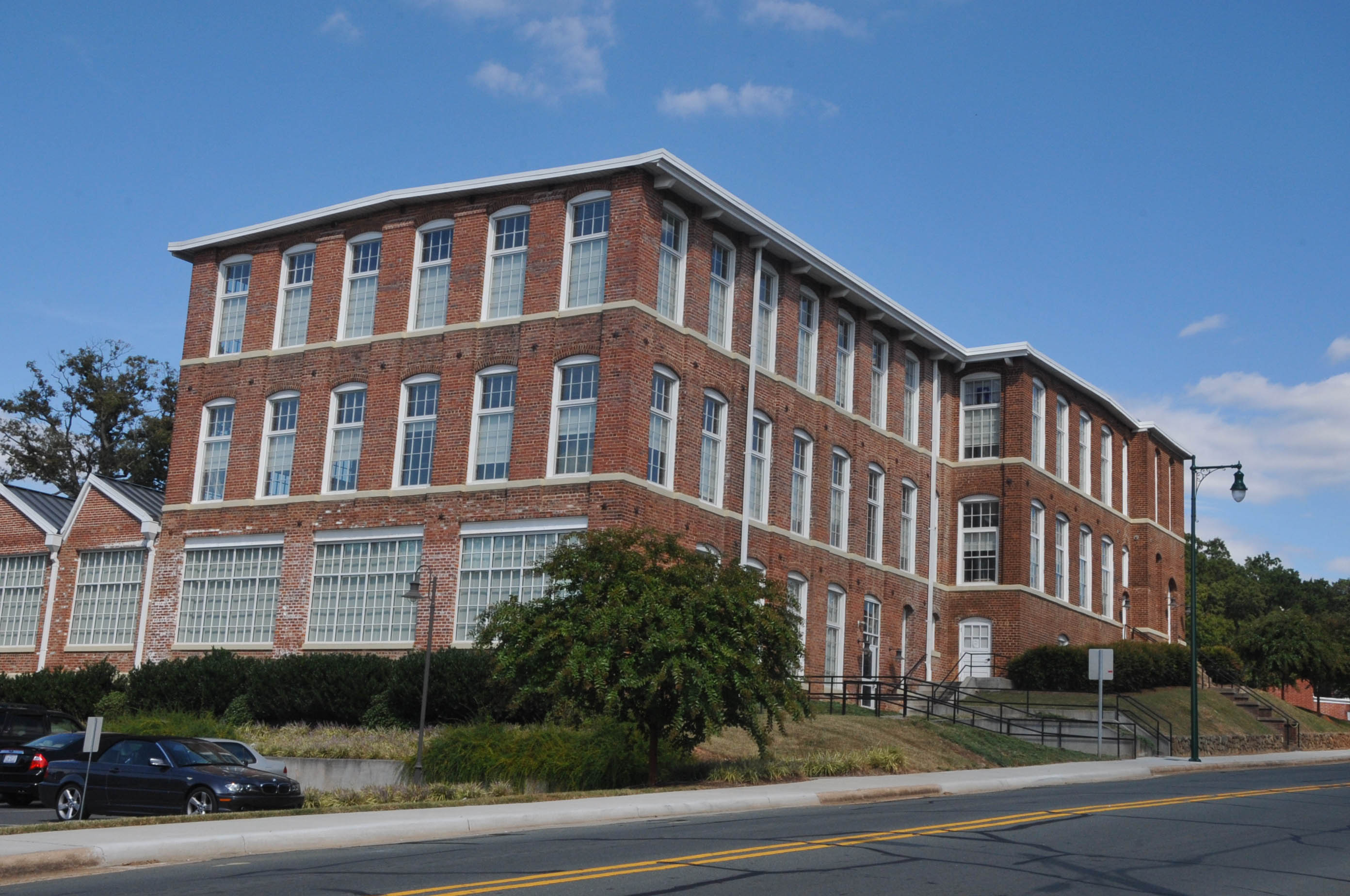
- Lillian Knitting Mills, March 2007

- Location within North Carolina Location within the United States
- Location: Jct. of E. Main St., Pee Dee Ave., and 4th St., Albemarle, North Carolina
- Coordinates: 35°21′1″N 80°11′41″W
- Area: 3.4 acres (1.4 ha)
- Built: 1905
- Built by: Holbroook(sic), D.A., builder
- Architectural style: Early Commercial, Industrial
- NRHP reference No.: 02001179
- Added to NRHP: October 16, 2002

Five Points Historic District is a national historic district located at Albemarle, Stanly County, North Carolina. The district encompasses six contributing buildings in the central business district of Albemarle. They were built between about 1905 and 1950 and include notable examples of Early Commercial and Industrial architecture. Notable buildings include the Service Station-Building (c. 1929, 1940), Anderson Grocery Building (c. 1928), The Model Tailoring Company (1922, c. 1940), Morgan Motor Company Building (1922, 1930s), and Lillian Knitting Mills (1905, 1938, late 1940s).

It was added to the National Register of Historic Places in 2002.
