= West Badin Historic District =

Historic district in North Carolina, United States

- U.S. National Register of Historic Places
- U.S. Historic district
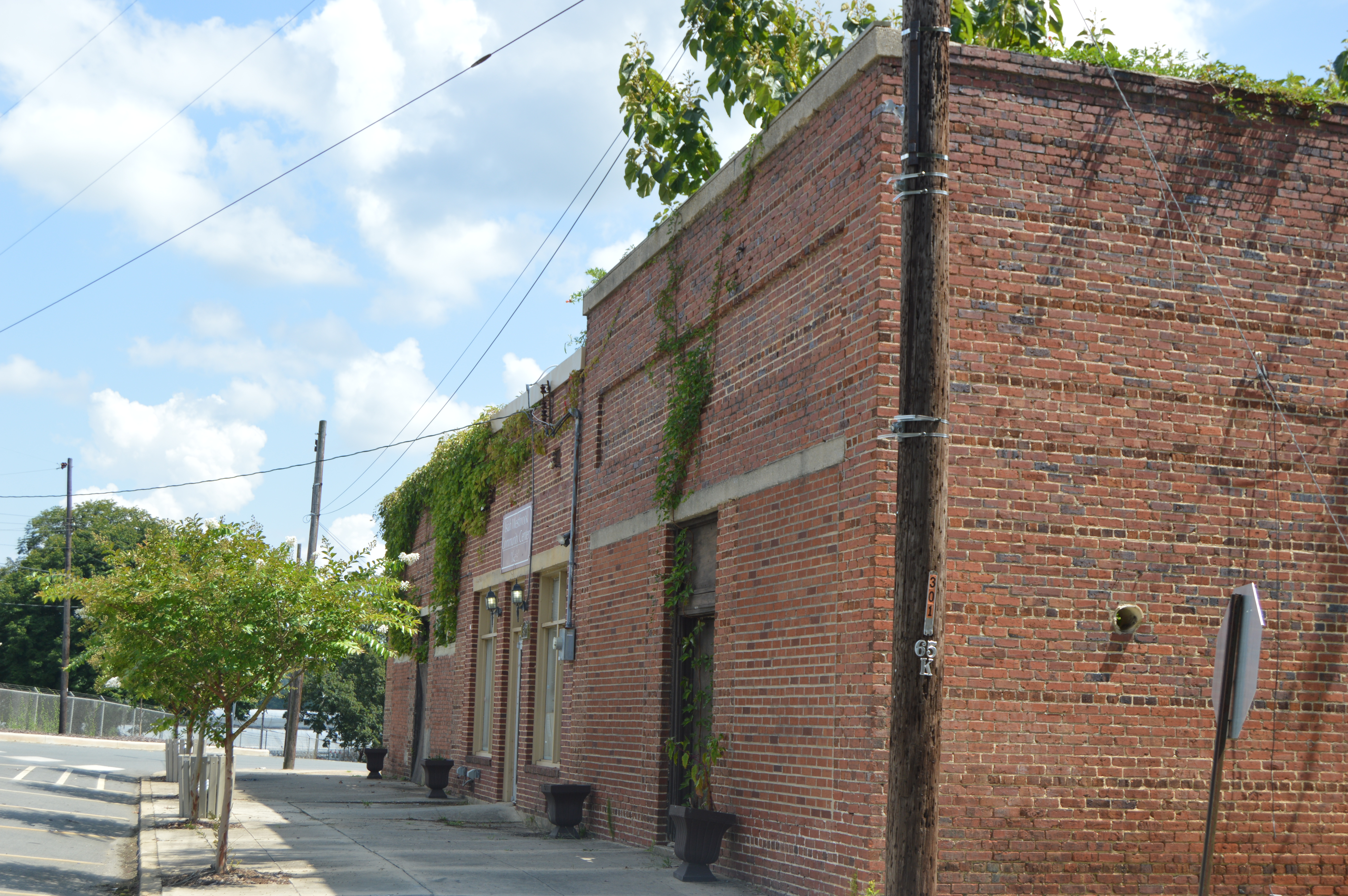
- Commercial building on Roosevelt Street

- Location within North Carolina Location within the United States
- Location: Roughly bounded by Sims, Lincoln, Marion, and Lee Sts., Badin, North Carolina
- Coordinates: 35°24′35″N 80°07′28″W
- Area: 84 acres (34 ha)
- Architectural style: Bungalow/craftsman, Gothic
- MPS: Badin MRA
- NRHP reference No.: 83004002
- Added to NRHP: October 12, 1983

West Badin Historic District is a national historic district located at Badin, Stanly County, North Carolina. The district encompasses 153 contributing buildings and 4 contributing sites in the company town of Badin. They were built starting about 1912 and include residential, institutional, and commercial structures in Gothic Revival and Bungalow / American Craftsman style architecture. The community was developed by the Southern Aluminum Company of America, later Alcoa, with West Badin developed for African-American residents. Notable buildings include the houses at 704 Roosevelt Street and 417 Jackson Street, 228-226 Lincoln Avenue duplex, Baptist Church, McDonald's Chapel AME Zion Church, and Badin Colored School.

It was added to the National Register of Historic Places in 1983.
