= Downtown Albemarle Historic District =

Historic district in North Carolina, United States

- U.S. National Register of Historic Places
- U.S. Historic district
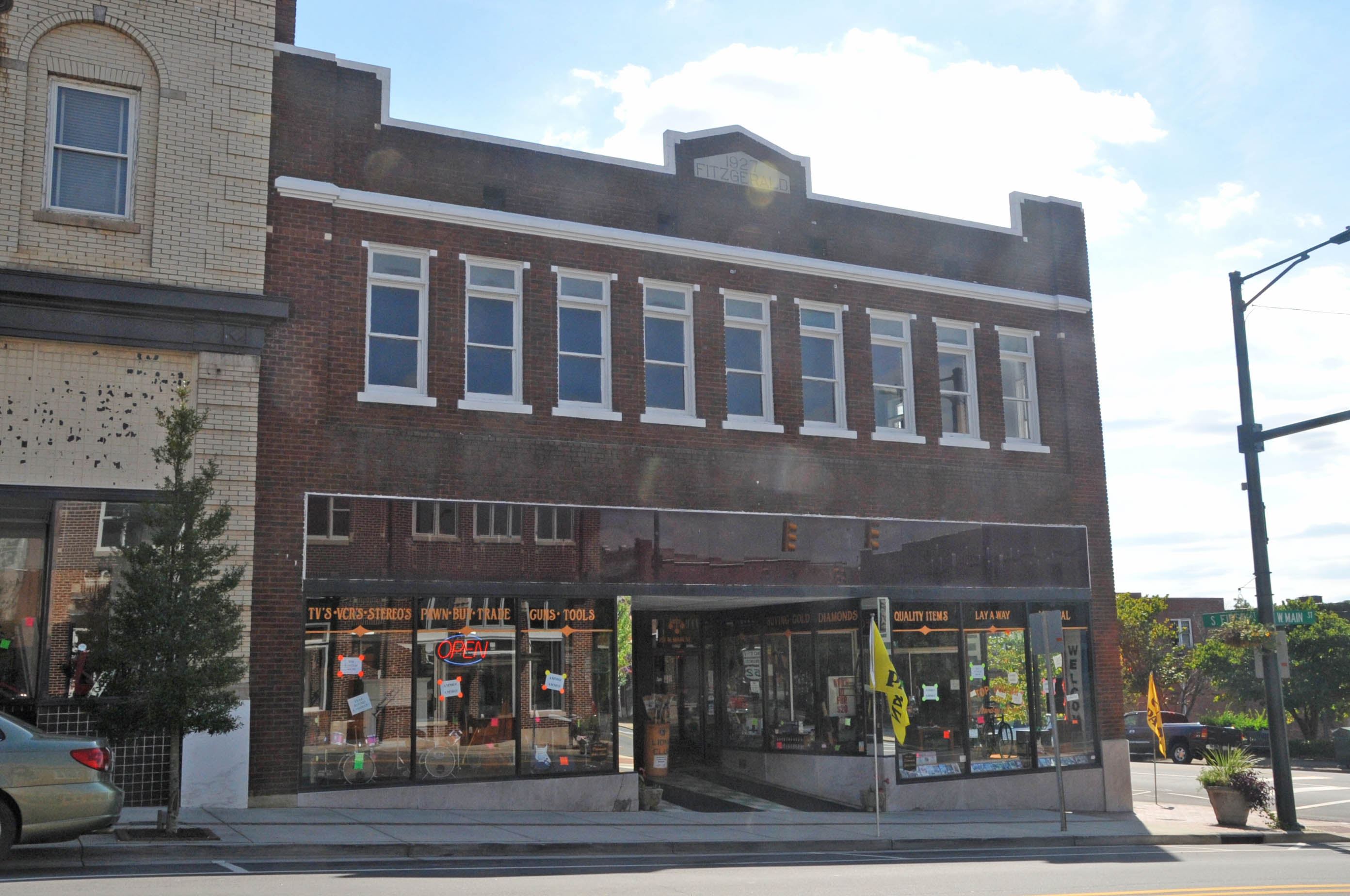
- Fitzgerald Building, March 2007

- Location within North Carolina Location within the United States
- Location: Portions of S. 2nd, W. Main and N. and S. 1st Sts., Albemarle, North Carolina
- Coordinates: 35°21′0″N 80°11′58″W
- Area: 5 acres (2.0 ha)
- Built by: Moody, L.A.
- Architectural style: Early Commercial
- NRHP reference No.: 02000275
- Added to NRHP: March 28, 2002

Downtown Albemarle Historic District is a national historic district located at Albemarle, Stanly County, North Carolina. The district encompasses 20 contributing buildings in the central business district of Albemarle. They were built between about 1898 and 1950 and include notable examples of Early Commercial architecture. Located in the district and separately listed is the Starnes Opera House. Other notable buildings include the Central Lunch (1929-1930, c. 1950), Farmers Hardware and General Store (1898), King Block I (1898), King Block II (1898), King Block III (1898), J. C. Parker Building (1898), King Building (1898), Hall's Pharmacy Building (c. 1908), Efird Dry Goods Store (1903), The Enterprise Steam Print Building (1922), "The Big Store" (1898), Fitzgerald Building (1927), and Morgan Furniture Building (1924).

It was added to the National Register of Historic Places in 2002.
