= Thomas Marcellus Denning House =

Historic house in North Carolina, United States

- U.S. National Register of Historic Places
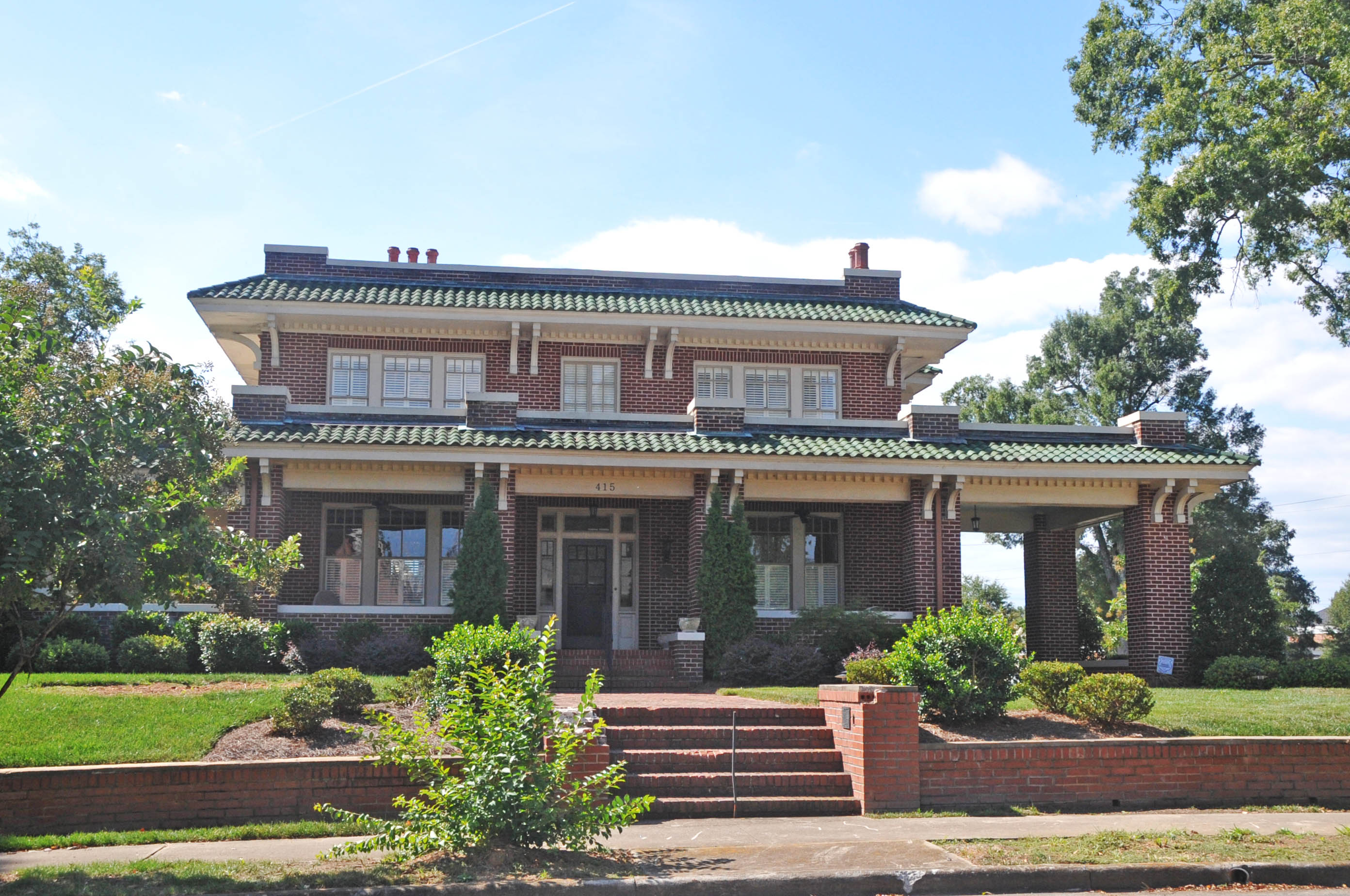
- Thomas Marcellus Denning House, March 2007

- Location within North Carolina Location within the United States
- Location: 415 N. Second St., Albemarle, North Carolina
- Coordinates: 35°21′22″N 80°11′53″W
- Area: 0.5 acres (0.20 ha)
- Built: c. 1924-1925
- Architect: Asbury, Louis Humbert, Sr.
- Architectural style: Spanish Colonial Revival
- NRHP reference No.: 10001177
- Added to NRHP: January 24, 2011

Thomas Marcellus Denning House, is a historic home located at Albemarle, Stanly County, North Carolina. It was designed by architect Louis H. Asbury and built in 1924–1925. It is a two-story, double pile, Spanish Colonial Revival-style brick dwelling. It features bracketed, tiled pent cornices; full-façade porch with a parapet roof; and a side/sun porch with a porte cochere. Also on the property is a contributing brick garage.

It was added to the National Register of Historic Places in 2011.
