= Badin Historic District =

Historic district in North Carolina, United States

- U.S. National Register of Historic Places
- U.S. Historic district
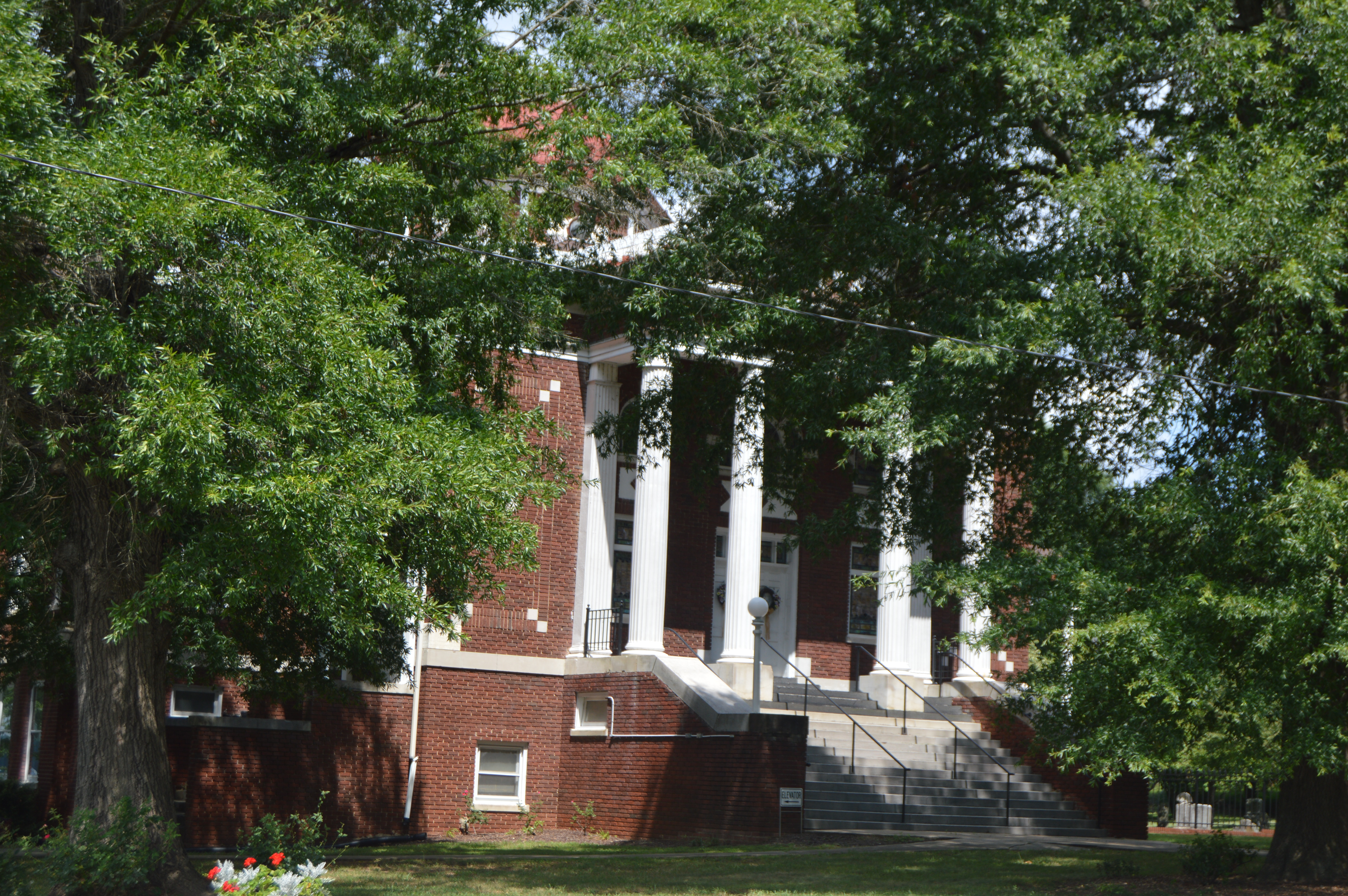
- Badin Baptist Church

- Location within North Carolina Location within the United States
- Location: Roughly bounded by NC 740, Pine St., and Country Club property line, Badin, North Carolina
- Coordinates: 35°24′13″N 80°06′45″W
- Area: 170 acres (69 ha)
- Built by: G.H. Giesey Associates; Pierson & Goodrich
- Architectural style: Bungalow/craftsman, Gothic Revival
- MPS: Badin MRA
- NRHP reference No.: 83004000
- Added to NRHP: October 12, 1983

Badin Historic District is a national historic district located at Badin, Stanly County, North Carolina. The district encompasses 200 contributing buildings and 8 contributing sites in the company town of Badin. They were built starting about 1912 and include residential, institutional, and commercial structures in Gothic Revival and Bungalow / American Craftsman style architecture. The community was developed by the Southern Aluminum Company of America, later Alcoa, with Badin developed for white residents. Notable buildings include the Badin Hospital (c. 1920), Badin Elementary School (c. 1920), 24 Henderson Street (c. 1916-1917), 28-30 Henderson Street duplex (1914), 27-33 Boyden Street quadruplex (1913-1914), Badin Club House (c. 1914) and Club House Annex (c. 1920), and Badin Baptist Church (c. 1925).

It was added to the National Register of Historic Places in 1983.
