= Randle House =

Historic house in North Carolina, United States

- U.S. National Register of Historic Places
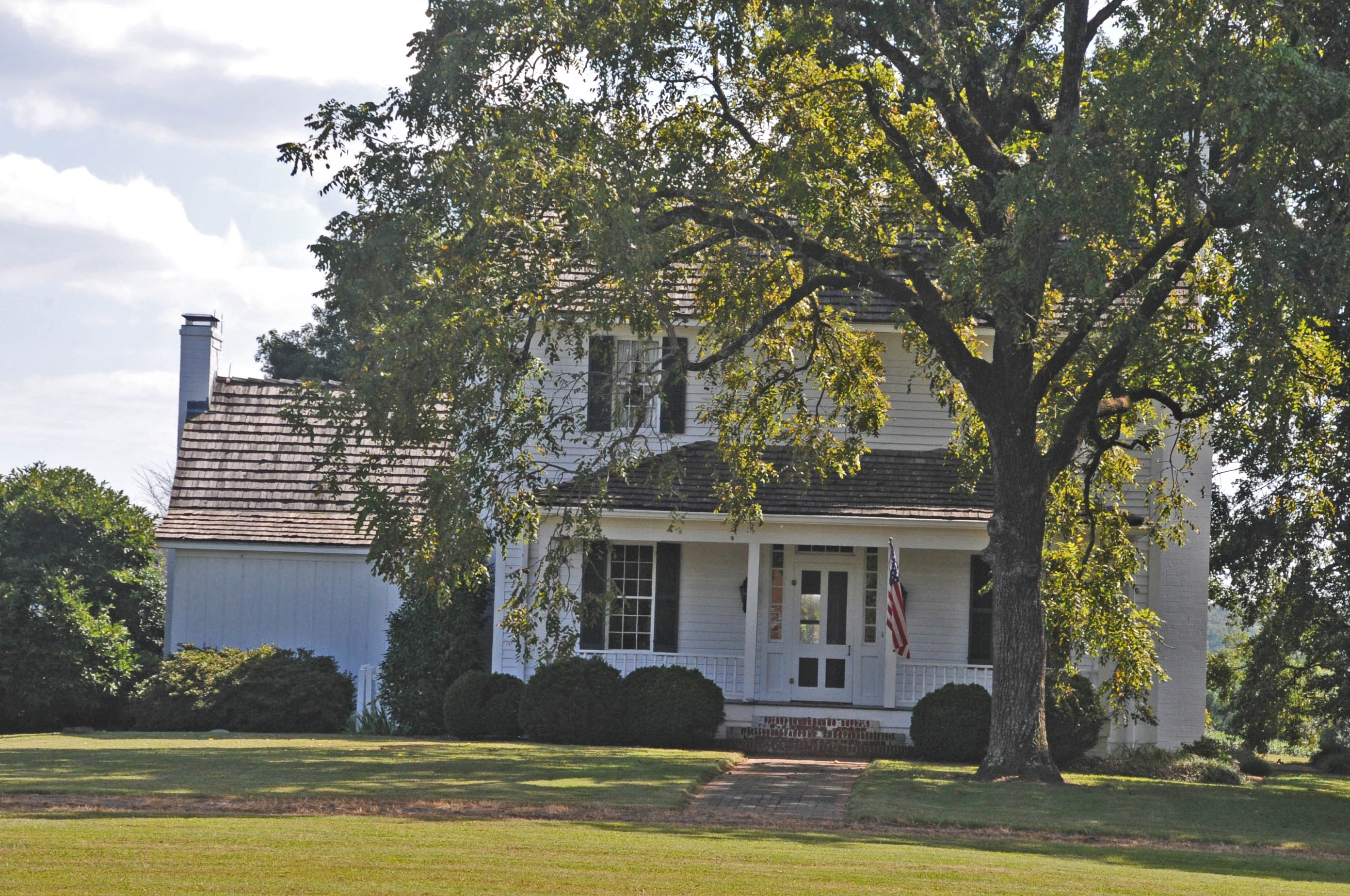
- Randle House, March 2007

- Location within North Carolina Location within the United States
- Location: Southern side of NC 1802 at its junction with NC 1743, near Norwood, North Carolina
- Coordinates: 35°15′45″N 80°06′15″W
- Area: 14 acres (5.7 ha)
- Built: c. 1835
- Architectural style: Greek Revival, Federal, Vernacular Fed/Greek Revival
- NRHP reference No.: 92001172
- Added to NRHP: September 8, 1992

Randle House, also known as the Randall House, is a historic plantation house located near Norwood, Stanly County, North Carolina. It was built about 1835, and is a two-story, transitional Federal / Greek Revival style frame I-house dwelling. It is sheathed in weatherboard and has a gable roof. It has a gable roofed ell and attached kitchen/dining building. The front facade features a hipped roof porch.

It was added to the National Register of Historic Places in 1992.
