= Narrows Dam and Power Plant Complex =

Historic district in North Carolina, United States

- U.S. National Register of Historic Places
- U.S. Historic district
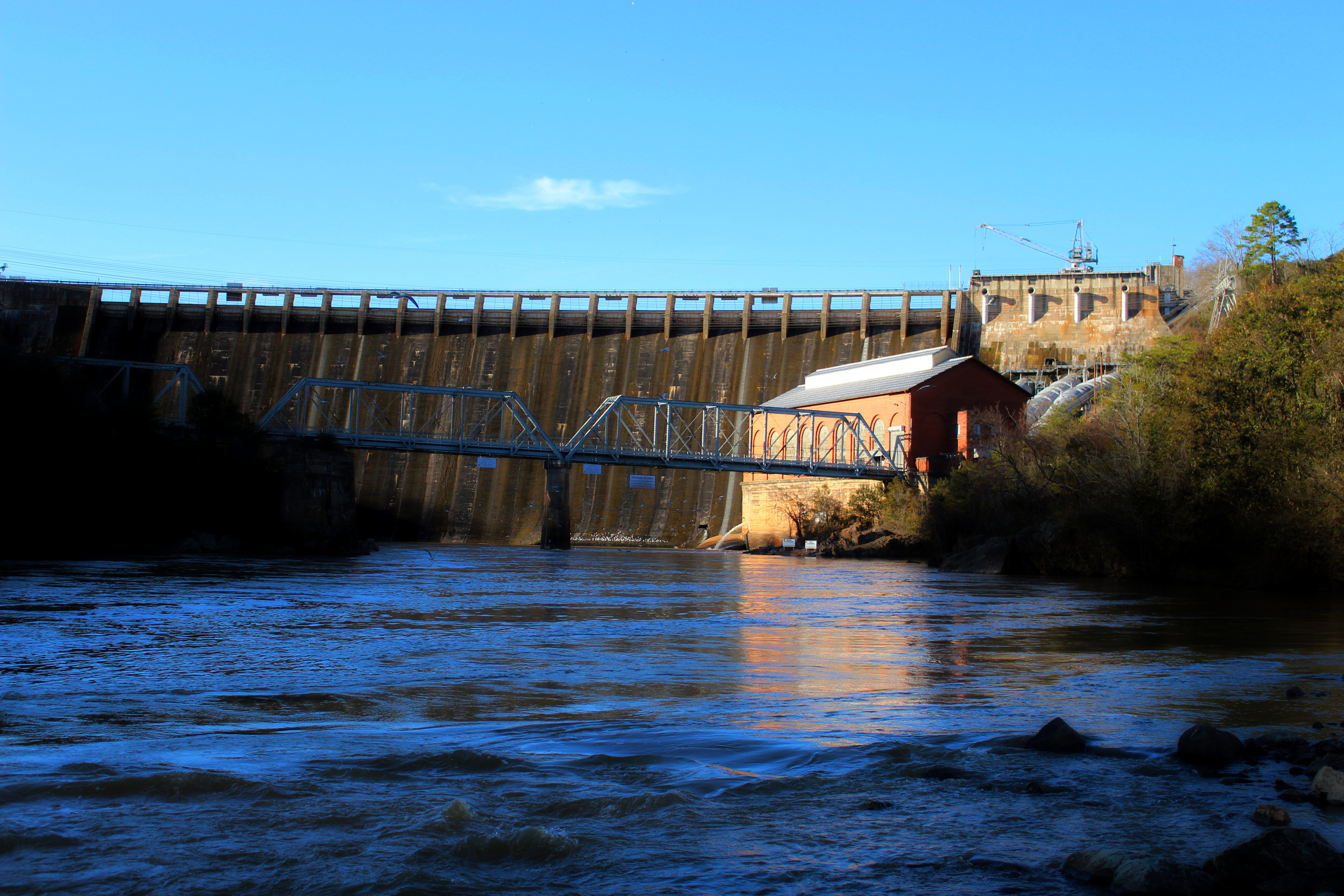

- Location within North Carolina Location within the United States
- Location: Yadkin River and SR 1704, Badin, North Carolina
- Coordinates: 35°25′07″N 80°05′33″W
- Area: 72 acres (29 ha)
- Built: 1917
- Built by: James W. Rickey
- Architectural style: Concrete arch dam
- MPS: Badin MRA
- NRHP reference No.: 83004001
- Added to NRHP: October 12, 1983

Narrows Dam and Power Plant Complex is a national historic district located at Badin, Stanly County, North Carolina. The district encompasses one contributing building and two contributing structures in the company town of Badin. The dam and power plant were built in 1917 by Alcoa to support the Badin plant. At the time of its completion, the Narrows Dam was the world's highest overflow type dam. The Narrows power plant is a one-story building nine bays wide with a gable roof and six-foot raised monitor roof.

It was added to the National Register of Historic Places in 1983.
