= Opera House–Starnes Jewelers Building =

Historic building in North Carolina, US

- U.S. National Register of Historic Places
- U.S. Historic district – Contributing property
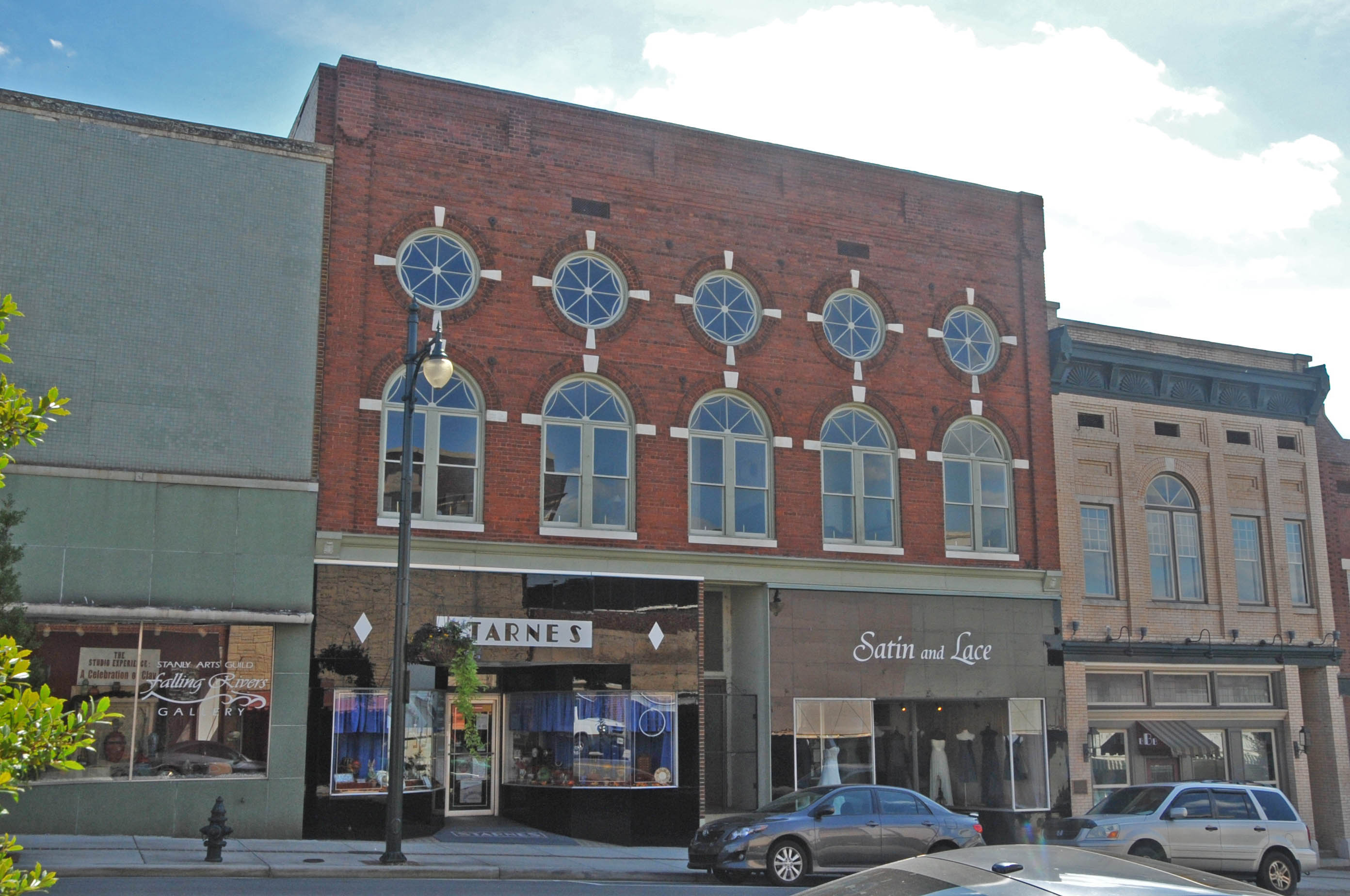
- Opera House–Starnes Jewelers Building, March 2007

- Location within North Carolina Location within the United States
- Location: 127-133 W. Main St., Albemarle, North Carolina
- Coordinates: 35°21′1″N 80°11′56″W
- Area: less than one acre
- Built: 1907-1908, 1939
- Built by: Moody, Locke Anderson
- Architectural style: Colonial Revival, Moderne
- NRHP reference No.: 95000180
- Added to NRHP: March 9, 1995

Opera House–Starnes Jewelers Building, also known as Starnes Jewelers and Opera House, is a historic commercial building located at Albemarle, Stanly County, North Carolina. It was built in 1907–1908, and is a 2 1/2-story, Colonial Revival-style brick building. It has a parapet-front standing-seam metal roof. In 1939, the first floor storefronts were remodeled and fitted with black Carrara glass panel facades, plate glass, and chromium display windows and entrances in the Art Moderne style. The building's front was restored in 1990.

It was added to the National Register of Historic Places in 1995. It is located in the Downtown Albemarle Historic District.
