= Isaiah Wilson Snugs House =

Historic house in North Carolina, United States

- U.S. National Register of Historic Places
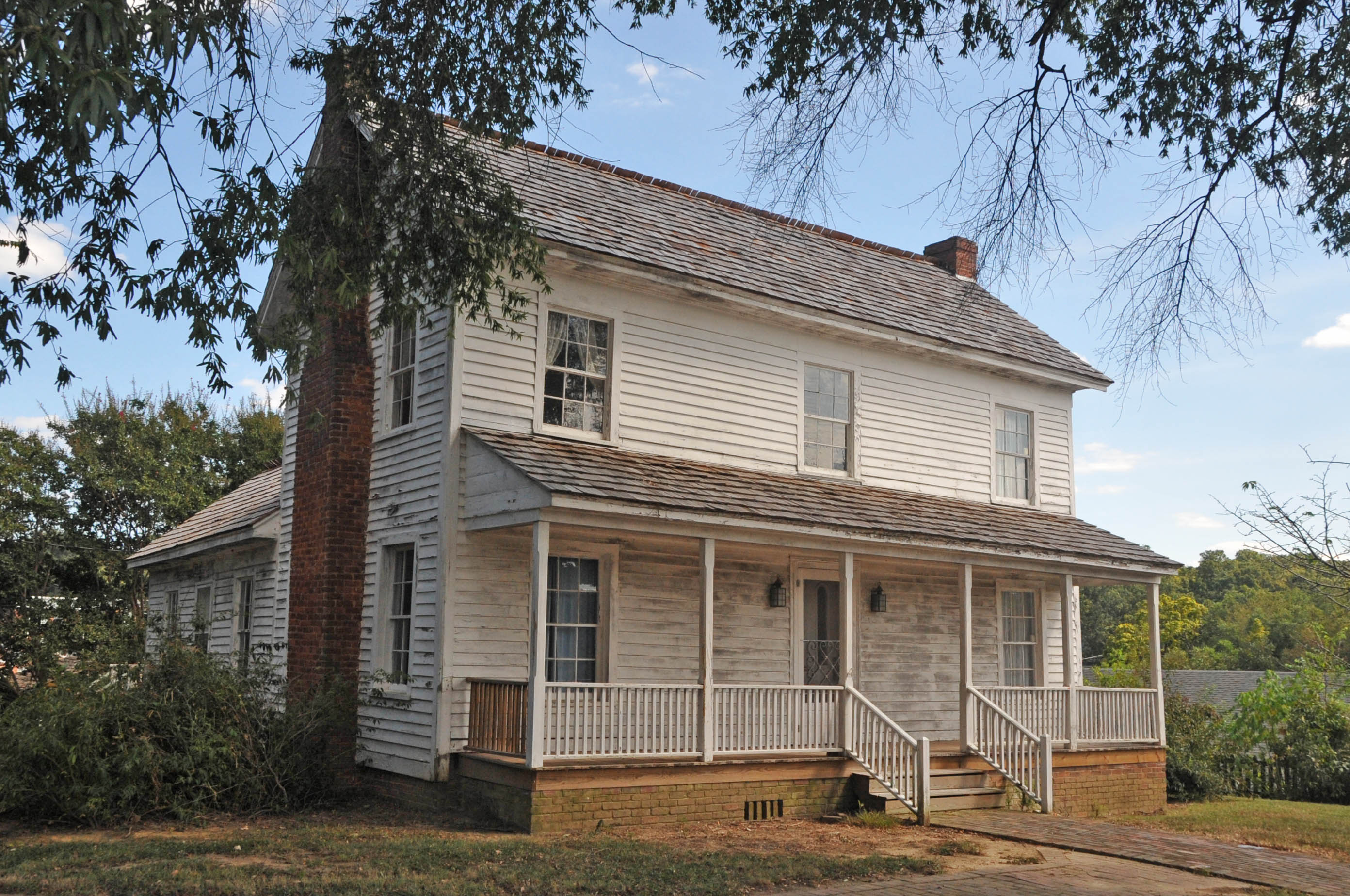
- Isaiah Wilson Snugs House, March 2007

- Location within North Carolina Location within the United States
- Location: 112 N. Third St., Albemarle, North Carolina
- Coordinates: 35°21′3″N 80°11′46″W
- Area: less than one acre
- Built: c. 1847-1850, c. 1874
- Architectural style: Fed-Greek Revival Transition
- NRHP reference No.: 95000190
- Added to NRHP: March 9, 1995

The Isaiah Wilson Snugs House, also known as the Isaiah Wilson Snugs House and the Marks House, are two historic homes located at Albemarle, Stanly County, North Carolina. The Marks House was built about 1847, and is a two-story, transitional Federal / Greek Revival style frame dwelling. It is the oldest surviving house in Albemarle. It was moved to its present site behind the Snuggs house in 1975. The Isaiah Wilson Snuggs House, the second oldest in Albemarle, was built about 1874, and is a two-story, three-bay, frame dwelling, with a two-room kitchen/dining room ell. The houses were restored in the 1980s and are operated as historic house museums by the Stanly County Museum.

It was added to the National Register of Historic Places in 1995.
