= Second Street Historic District (Albemarle, North Carolina) =

Historic district in North Carolina, United States

- U.S. National Register of Historic Places
- U.S. Historic district
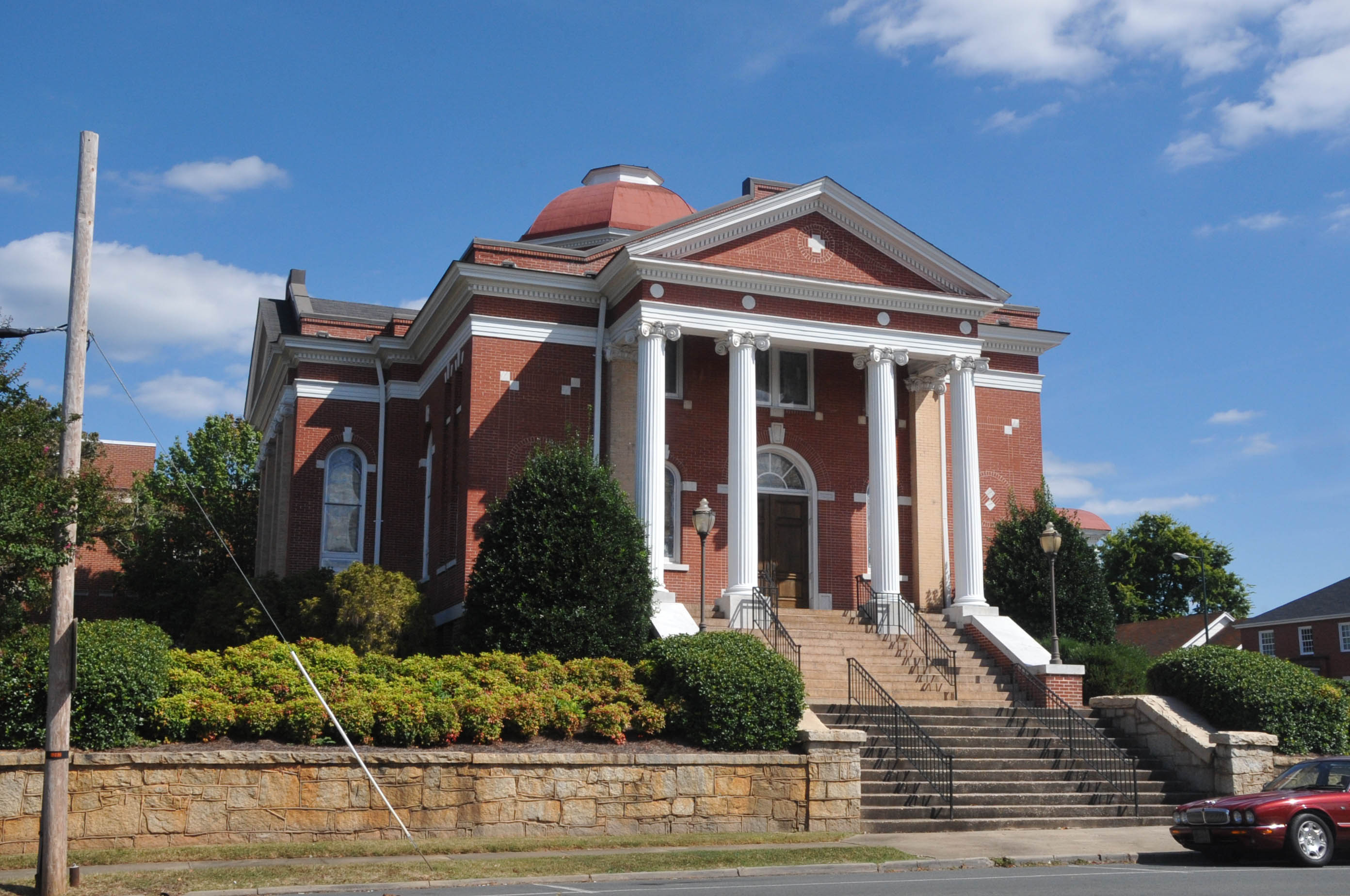
- First Baptist Church, March 2007

- Location within North Carolina Location within the United States
- Location: Portions of 100 and 200 blocks N. Second st. and 100 blk West North St., Albemarle, North Carolina
- Coordinates: 35°21′8″N 80°11′54″W
- Area: 9.5 acres (3.8 ha)
- Architect: Northup and O'Brien; Yoe, Thomas S., et al.
- Architectural style: Early Commercial, Late Gothic Revival, et al.
- NRHP reference No.: 05000266
- Added to NRHP: April 6, 2005

Second Street Historic District is a national historic district located at Albemarle, Stanly County, North Carolina. The district encompasses 12 contributing buildings in the central business district of Albemarle. They were built between about 1898 and 1950 and include notable examples of Early Commercial and Late Gothic Revival style architecture. Notable buildings include The Alameda Theater (1916), Albemarle Hotel (1923), First Presbyterian Church (1924), (former) U.S. Post Office (1936), First Baptist Church (1919), Wilhelm Service Station (1950), Central Methodist Church (1908), City Hall (1938), and Hearne Building (1906).

It was added to the National Register of Historic Places in 2005.
