= East Second Street Commercial Historic District =

East Second Street Commercial Historic District may refer to:

- East Second Street Commercial Historic District (Hastings, Minnesota)
- East Second Street Commercial Historic District (Winona, Minnesota), a National Register of Historic Places listing in Winona County, Minnesota
