= Albemarle, North Carolina =

- City
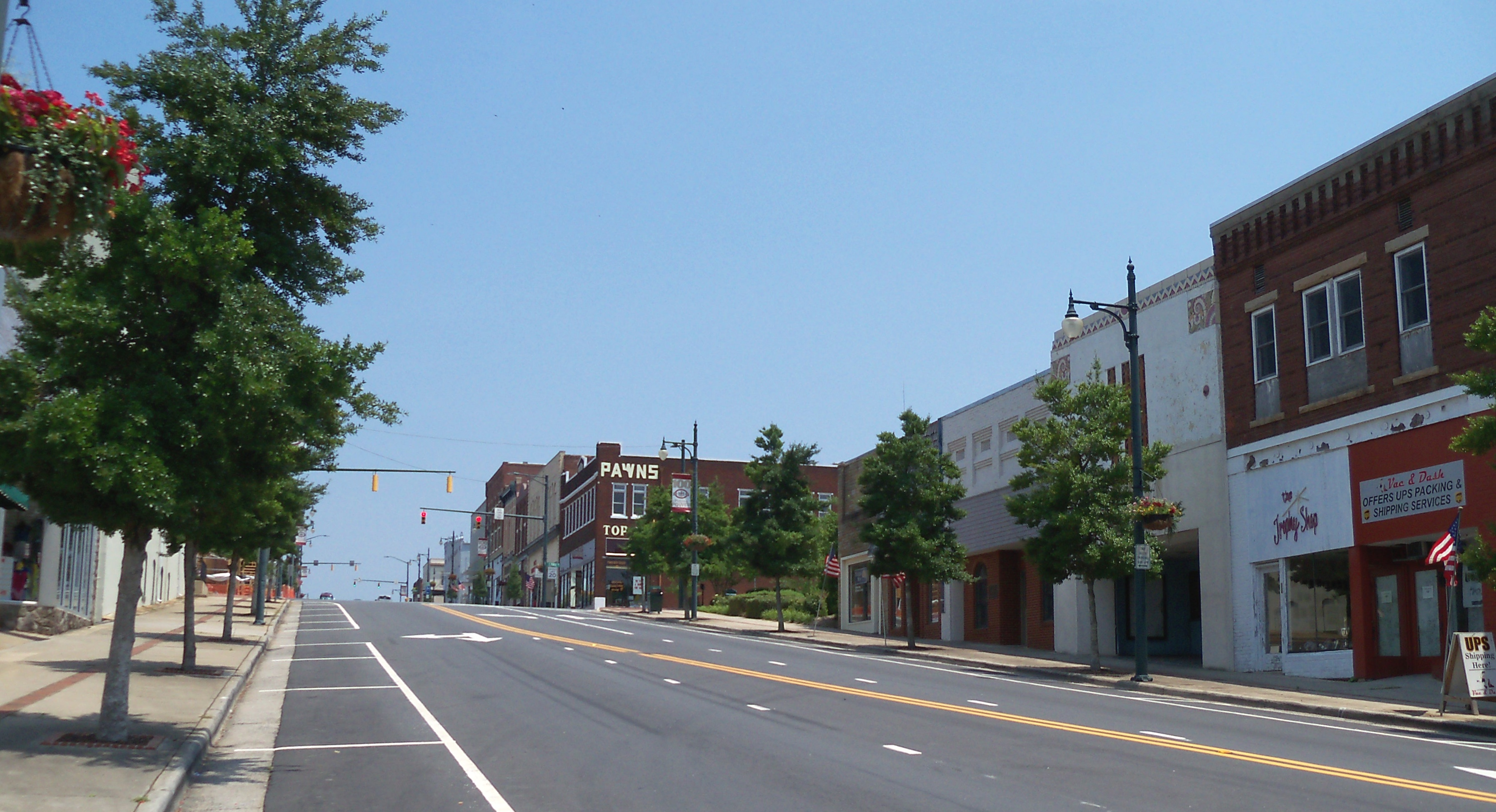
- Downtown Albemarle

- Seal
- Motto: "Water. Air. Land. Opportunity."
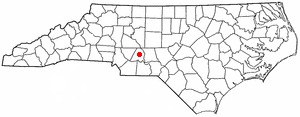
- Location in the U.S. state of North Carolina

- Location within North Carolina Location within the United States Location within North America
- Coordinates: 35°21′32″N 80°11′29″W
- Country: United States
- State: North Carolina
- County: Stanly
- Established: 1857

Government
  - Mayor: Gerald R. "Ronnie" Michael

Area
  - Total: 17.83 sq mi (46.19 km^{2})
  - Land: 17.71 sq mi (45.86 km^{2})
  - Water: 0.13 sq mi (0.33 km^{2})
- Elevation: 499 ft (152 m)

Population (2020)
  - Total: 16,432
  - Density: 928.1/sq mi (358.33/km^{2})
- Time zone: UTC-5 (EST)
  - Summer (DST): UTC-4 (EDT)
- ZIP codes: 28001-28002
- Area codes: 704
- FIPS code: 37-00680
- GNIS feature ID: 2403073
- Website: www.albemarlenc.gov

Albemarle (/ˈælbəˌmɑːrl/) is a city in and the county seat of Stanly County, North Carolina, United States. The population was 16,432 in the 2020 census.

Albemarle is located in the easternmost part of the Charlotte metropolitan area.

== History ==
=== Etymology ===
This place-name is derived from the English surname Albemarle. According to a 1905 publication by the United States Geologic Survey, based on research by University of North Carolina - Chapel Hill history professor Kemp P. Battle, it was named specifically for General George Monck, the first Duke of Albemarle and one of the original proprietors of the colony of Carolina, which included the town.

=== Ancient and colonial ===
The site of modern-day Albemarle was originally peopled by small tribes of hunter-gatherers and mound builders whose artifacts and settlements have been dated back nearly 10,000 years. Large-scale European settlement of the region came in the mid-18th century via two primary waves: immigrants of Dutch, Scots-Irish and German descent moved from Pennsylvania and New Jersey seeking enhanced religious and political tolerance, while immigrants of English backgrounds came to the region from Virginia and the Cape Fear River Basin in Eastern North Carolina.

In early English colonial times, the Albemarle area was politically part of the New Hanover Precinct, out of which the Bladen Precinct was created in 1734. The renamed Bladen County was subdivided to create Anson County in 1750, which in turn spawned Montgomery County in 1779.

=== Establishment of Stanly County and Albemarle ===
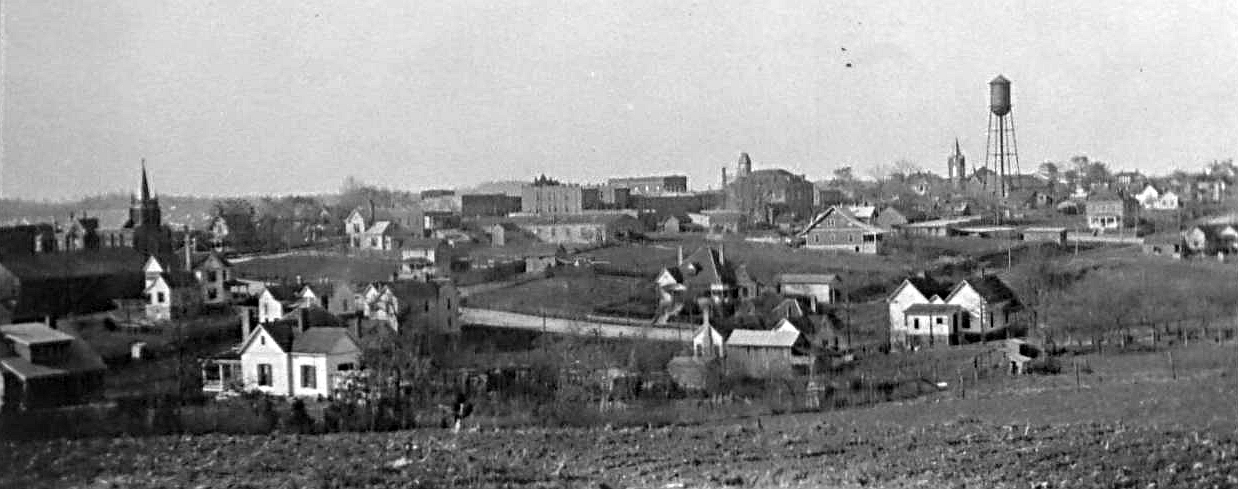
Albemarle, circa 1915

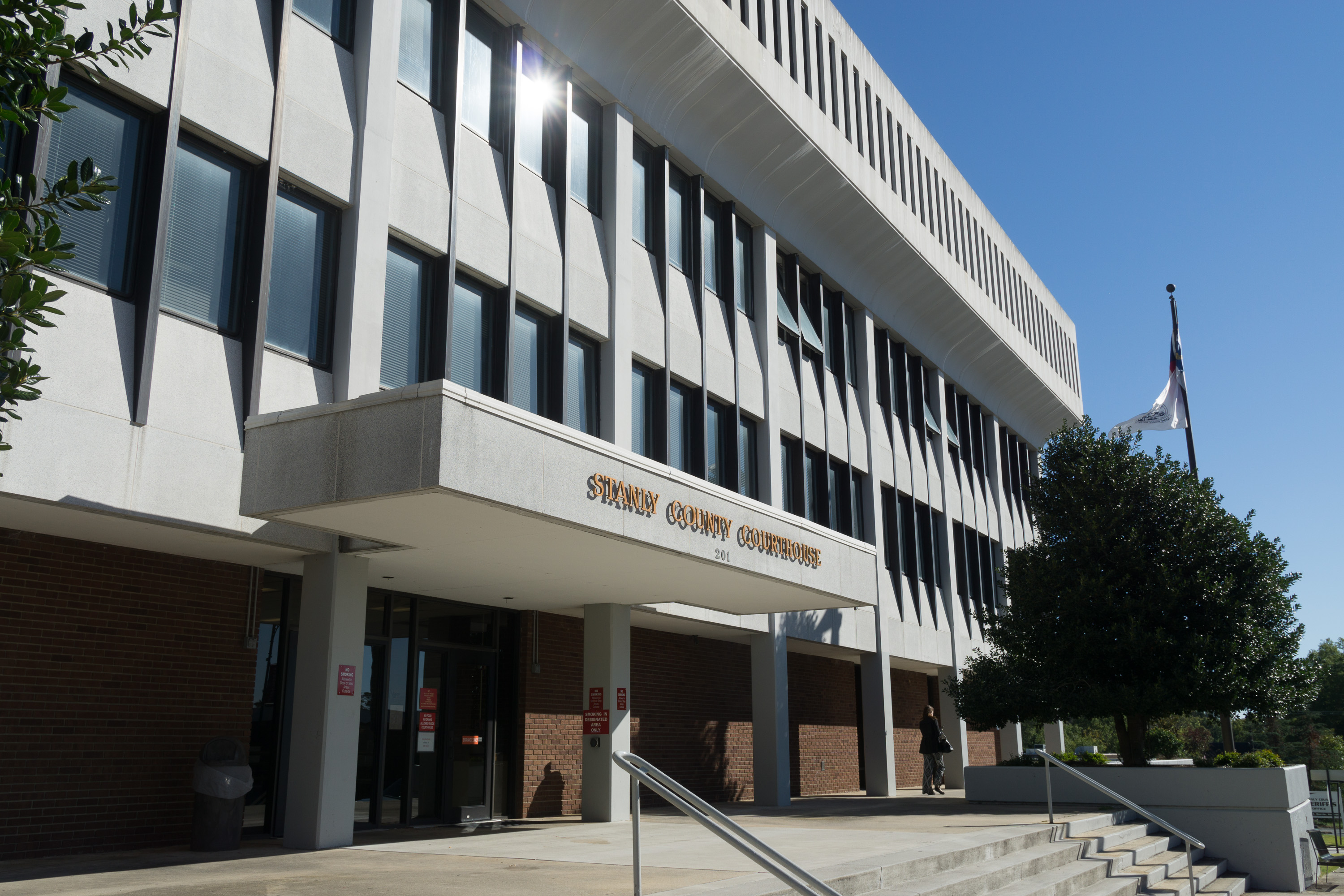
Stanly County Courthouse

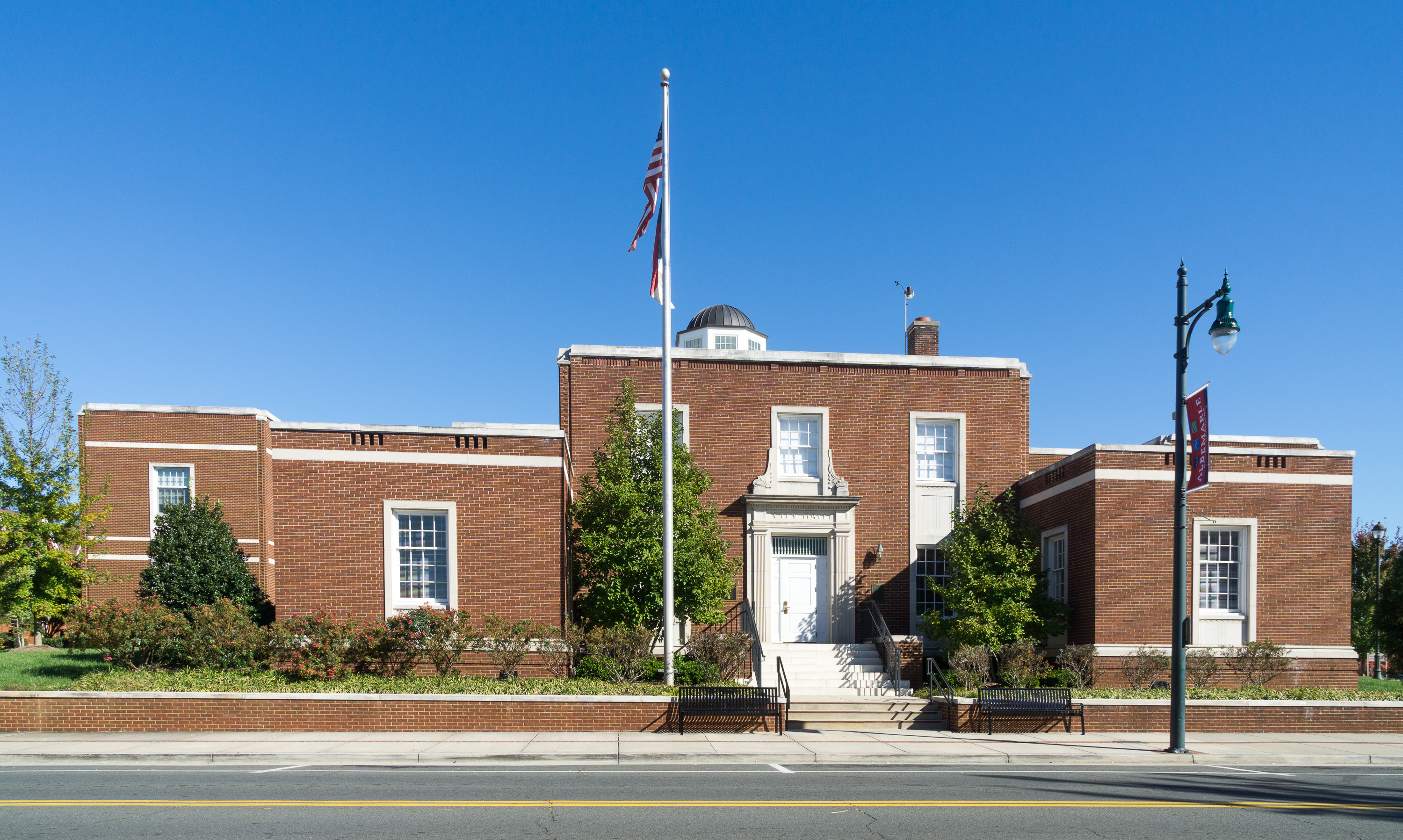
Albemarle City Hall

The Albemarle region's first post office was established in 1826; it was then known as Smith's Store. The nearby crossroads of the Old Turnpike Road from Fayetteville to Salisbury and the Old Stage Road connecting Charlotte and Raleigh emerged as an important hub for regional commerce and trade. The region remained part of Montgomery County until 1841, when after years of attempted separation, prominent residents of the increasingly populous areas west of the Yadkin/Pee Dee River system successfully petitioned the North Carolina General Assembly for the establishment of Stanly County as an independent entity.

Soon after the new county was formed, its Board of Commissioners was tasked with establishing a permanent county seat within eight miles (13 km) of the home of Eben Hearne (the county's first sheriff), and with laying out a new town, in which a courthouse would be erected. Nehemiah Hearne's heirs donated 51 acres (210,000 m^{2}) from his plantation near the intersection of the Old Turnpike and Old Stage Roads for the construction of the new County Seat. The County Commissioners established the town's boundaries, laid out streets and surveyed and marked parcels of property within Hearne's donated land. The first land lot sale financed the new town's public buildings and paid some part of the elected officials' salaries. The courthouse was erected in 1842 and used for 50 years. The City of Albemarle was formally incorporated in 1857. The town was named for Albemarle County, the first county established in North Carolina, which was in turn named for the Duke of Albemarle, George Monck, one of the Lords Proprietors granted the province of Carolina in 1663 by King Charles II.

=== Economic history ===
The Albemarle region's early economic growth was fueled by agriculture (with cotton as the primary crop), regional mercantile trade and a short-lived gold rush in the nearby Uwharrie Mountains, all later supplanted by textile manufacturing. The Efird Manufacturing Co. (later American and Efird Mills) opened its first mill in Albemarle in 1896, and was followed soon thereafter by the Wiscasset Mill Company, the Cannon Mill Company, the Lillian Knitting Mill and others. In 1899, Wiscassett Mills Company established Cabarrus Bank and Trust, the first bank in Albemarle. By 1910, an electrical distribution plan for the city was underway.

The Yadkin Railroad began rail service to Albemarle from Salisbury in 1891. In 1911, the Winston-Salem Southbound Railway (WSS) constructed its own line through Albemarle to support the booming textile and market, eventually driving the Yadkin Railroad into obsolescence. The WSS still provides freight service through Albemarle, but since 1933 there has been no passenger service to the city. The Old Market Street Station on the WSS line has been restored, and is now the site of a popular farmer's market. The railbed of the Yadkin Railroad has been ripped up and paved over, though a one-mile (1.6 km) segment of its route south of Albemarle now serves as a hiking trail in Rock Creek Park.

In 1923, a state contract was let to construct NC-24/27 to Charlotte, the first paved highway out of Albemarle. In 1950, Stanly County Memorial Hospital opened on land donated by Wiscassett Mills.

Albemarle got its first indoor shopping center in 1966, known as Quenby Mall, and would later be converted to house governmental services in 1993.

In 2024, a new cryptocurrency was developed in Albemarle as part of a fundraiser to save the local restaurant "Jay's Seafood", which had been damaged in a fire.

=== Historic preservation ===
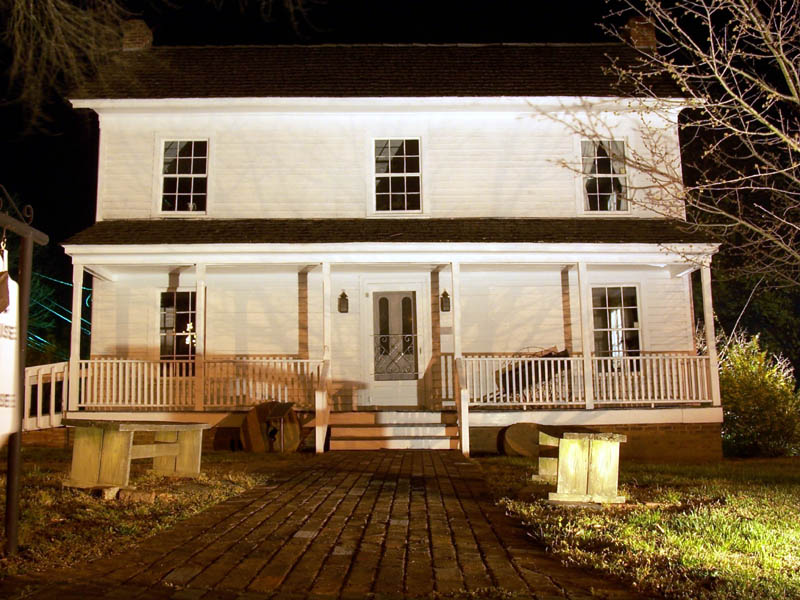
Historic Snuggs House

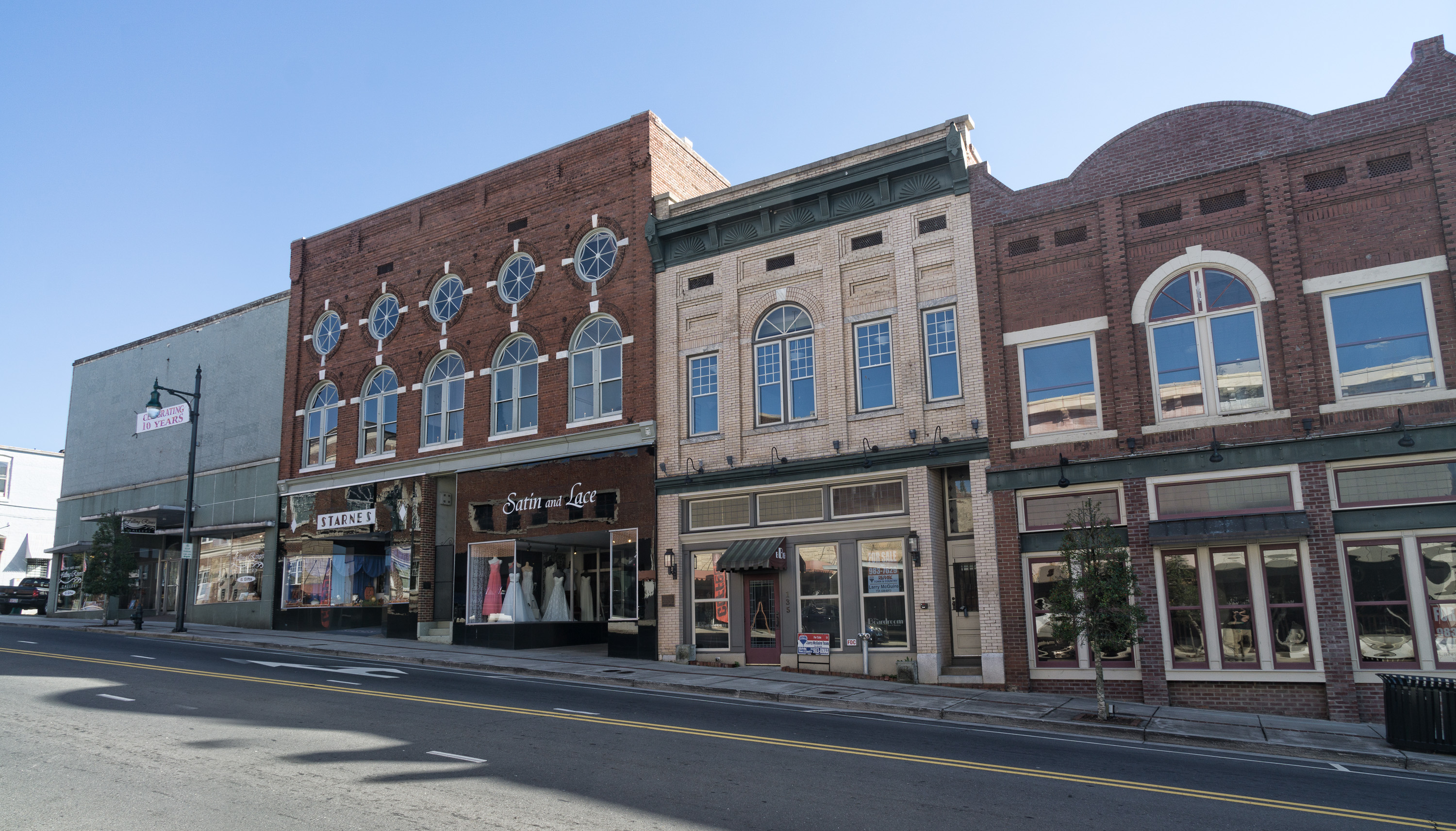
Looking down West Main Street, Albemarle Downtown Historic District

Albemarle was recognized by the National Trust for Historic Preservation as a National Main Street City in 1993. There are a number of historic preservation and adaptive reuse projects in its downtown that have been recently completed or are underway, including an initiative to create a greenway linking many of the city's parks and historic sites. The Freeman-Marks House, probably built during the 1820s, is the oldest known surviving house in Albemarle. It is listed in the National Register of Historic Places, along with the Romanesque Revival Opera House/Starnes Jewelers Building (1908) and three small historic districts in the city's downtown area. Another important historic property is the Isaiah W. "Buck" Snuggs House, an antebellum home on Third Street then owned and now named for a Stanly County sheriff who lost his leg in the Civil War Battle of Spotsylvania Court House. The Stanly County Museum in Albemarle provides a focal point for regional historic research and preservation.

The Albemarle Graded School-Central Elementary School, Thomas Marcellus Denning House, Downtown Albemarle Historic District, Five Points Historic District, Opera House-Starnes Jewelers Building, Pee Dee Avenue Historic District, Second Street Historic District, and Isaiah Wilson Snugs House are listed on the National Register of Historic Places.

== Geography ==
According to the United States Census Bureau, Albemarle has a total area of 15.8 square miles (41 km^{2}), of which 15.7 square miles (41 km^{2}) is land and 0.1 square miles (0.26 km^{2}) (0.44%) is water.

The city is centered on the junction of U.S. Route 52 and the duplexed NC-24/27 in the Piedmont Region of North Carolina. Its topography is characterized by rolling, eroded hills, deciduous forests, and fast-running, narrow, shallow streams that feed the Yadkin/Pee Dee River Basin. Little Long Creek and Town Creek are the major non-seasonal streams through Albemarle; both flow generally southward into the Long and Big Bear Creek Sub-basin.

=== Geology ===
Albemarle is located in the Floyd Church Formation of the Carolina Slate Belt. Thickly bedded, axially cleaved meta-mudstone and meta-argillite are common in this formation, interbedded with meta-sandstone, meta-conglomerate and meta-volcanic rock. Biotite is the most prevalent Paleozoic metamorphic rock in the region.

=== Climate ===
Albemarle has a humid subtropical climate (Köppen climate classification Cfa), with cool to mild winters and hot, humid summers.

Climate data for Albemarle, North Carolina (1991-2020 normals, extremes 1911–present)
Month	Jan	Feb	Mar	Apr	May	Jun	Jul	Aug	Sep	Oct	Nov	Dec	Year
Record high °F (°C)	82 (28)	84 (29)	92 (33)	95 (35)	102 (39)	106 (41)	109 (43)	107 (42)	105 (41)	102 (39)	88 (31)	81 (27)	109 (43)
Mean daily maximum °F (°C)	50.9 (10.5)	54.7 (12.6)	62.5 (16.9)	71.5 (21.9)	78.7 (25.9)	85.5 (29.7)	88.6 (31.4)	87.2 (30.7)	81.3 (27.4)	72.6 (22.6)	62.0 (16.7)	53.8 (12.1)	70.8 (21.5)
Mean daily minimum °F (°C)	30.9 (−0.6)	33.3 (0.7)	40.4 (4.7)	48.3 (9.1)	57.3 (14.1)	65.7 (18.7)	69.2 (20.7)	68.1 (20.1)	61.5 (16.4)	49.6 (9.8)	39.6 (4.2)	34.2 (1.2)	49.8 (9.9)
Record low °F (°C)	−7 (−22)	1 (−17)	5 (−15)	20 (−7)	29 (−2)	40 (4)	47 (8)	44 (7)	33 (1)	21 (−6)	11 (−12)	0 (−18)	−7 (−22)
Average rainfall inches (mm)	3.80 (97)	2.96 (75)	3.99 (101)	3.74 (95)	3.50 (89)	4.74 (120)	5.23 (133)	4.85 (123)	4.62 (117)	3.59 (91)	3.34 (85)	3.92 (100)	48.28 (1,226)
Average snowfall inches (cm)	0.4 (1.0)	0 (0)	0.4 (1.0)	0 (0)	0 (0)	0 (0)	0 (0)	0 (0)	0 (0)	0 (0)	0 (0)	0 (0)	0.8 (2)
Source: NOAA

== Demographics ==
Historical population
Census	Pop.	Note	%±
1890	248		—
1900	1,382		457.3%
1910	2,116		53.1%
1920	2,691		27.2%
1930	3,493		29.8%
1940	4,060		16.2%
1950	11,798		190.6%
1960	12,261		3.9%
1970	11,126		−9.3%
1980	15,110		35.8%
1990	14,939		−1.1%
2000	15,680		5.0%
2010	15,903		1.4%
2020	16,432		3.3%
2025 (est.)	17,769	▲	8.1%
U.S. Decennial Census

=== 2020 census ===
As of the 2020 census, Albemarle had a population of 16,432. The median age was 40.8 years. 21.8% of residents were under the age of 18 and 20.3% of residents were 65 years of age or older. For every 100 females there were 89.1 males, and for every 100 females age 18 and over there were 85.8 males age 18 and over.

95.7% of residents lived in urban areas, while 4.3% lived in rural areas.

There were 6,763 households in Albemarle, including 4,108 families. Of all households, 28.1% had children under the age of 18 living in them, 36.9% were married-couple households, 19.9% were households with a male householder and no spouse or partner present, and 35.7% were households with a female householder and no spouse or partner present. About 34.7% of all households were made up of individuals and 15.5% had someone living alone who was 65 years of age or older.

There were 7,511 housing units, of which 10.0% were vacant. The homeowner vacancy rate was 2.4% and the rental vacancy rate was 5.2%.

Albemarle racial composition
Race	Number	Percentage
White (non-Hispanic)	10,205	62.1%
Black or African American (non-Hispanic)	3,873	23.57%
Native American	44	0.27%
Asian	452	2.75%
Pacific Islander	1	0.01%
Other/Mixed	853	5.19%
Hispanic or Latino	1,004	6.11%

=== 2010 census ===
As of the census of 2010, there were 15,489 people, 6,291 households, and 4,158 families residing in the city. The population density was 999.0 inhabitants per square mile (385.7/km^{2}). There were 6,954 housing units at an average density of 443.1 per square mile (171.1/km^{2}). The racial makeup of the city was 72.85% White, 20.50% African American, 0.24% Native American, 4.16% Asian, 0.03% Pacific Islander, 1.07% from other races, and 1.14% from two or more races. Hispanic or Latino people of any race were 1.87% of the population.

There were 6,291 households, out of which 30.6% had children under the age of 18 living with them, 47.8% were married couples living together, 14.4% had a female householder with no husband present, and 33.9% were non-families. 30.4% of all households were made up of individuals, and 14.4% had someone living alone who was 65 years of age or older. The average household size was 2.42 and the average family size was 3.02.

In the city, the population was spread out, with 26.0% under the age of 18, 8.4% from 18 to 24, 26.9% from 25 to 44, 21.3% from 45 to 64, and 17.4% who were 65 years of age or older. The median age was 37 years. For every 100 females, there were 87.6 males. For every 100 females age 18 and over, there were 82.4 males.

The median income for a household in the city was $31,442, and the median income for a family was $41,729. Males had a median income of $31,001 versus $20,589 for females. The per capita income for the city was $17,511. About 11.8% of families and 15.7% of the population were below the poverty line, including 21.6% of those under age 18 and 10.8% of those age 65 or over.

== Parks and recreation ==
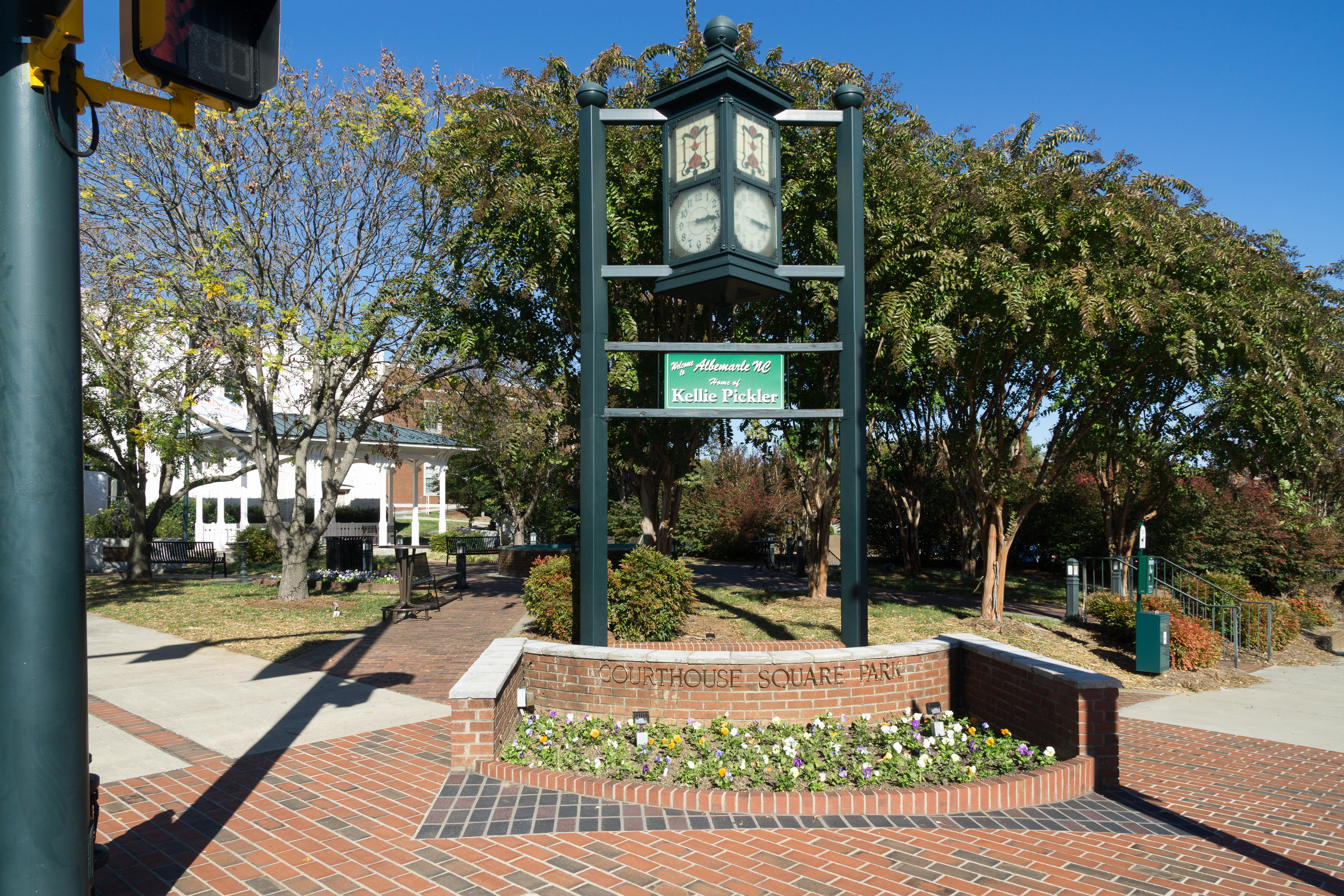
Courthouse Square Park

Albemarle's Parks and Recreation Department was established in 1963. It currently operates and administers five parks within the city's limits, as well as a soccer complex and a ceramics facility. The newest facility under the department's purview is City Lake, a 75-acre (300,000 m^{2}) park on a 100-acre (0.40 km^{2}) lake that was opened in 2003, joining Rock Creek Park, Chuck Morehead Memorial Park, Roosevelt Ingram Memorial Park and Don Montgomery Memorial Park.

Morrow Mountain State Park is a large state park located east of the city. It is situated on a high elevation in the Uwharrie Mountains adjoining the Yadkin River, and offers many recreational activities. The park features a natural history museum and the restored 19th-century home site of Dr. Francis J. Kron.

== Education ==
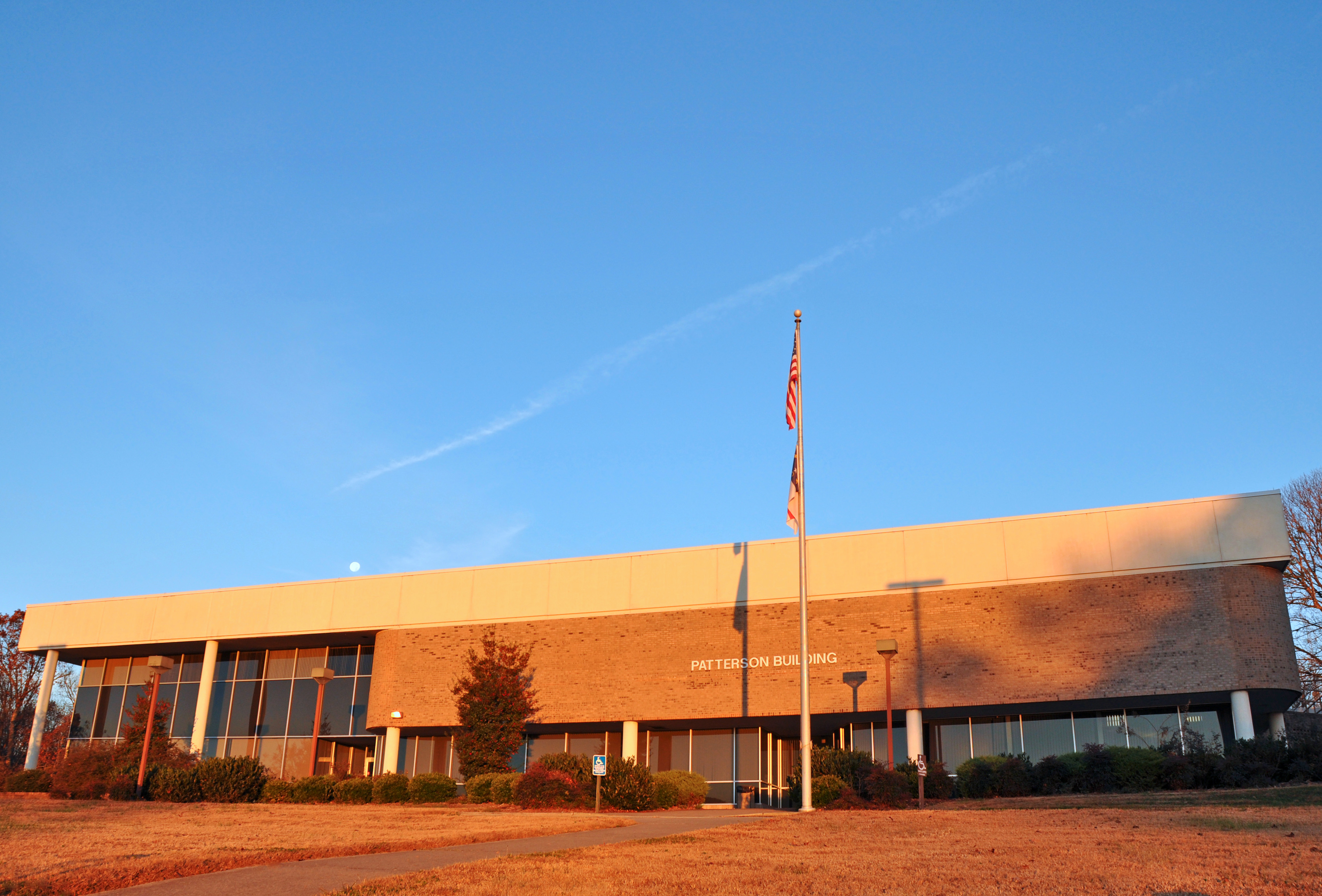
Patterson Building, Stanly Community College

- Albemarle High School
- Stanly Community College

== Media ==
Albemarle and its environs are served by the Stanly News Journal, which merged with a paper founded in 1880 and is currently owned by North State Media. The Weekly Post is a newspaper focusing on local community events in the area. Albemarle is also within the outer coverage and delivery area of The Charlotte Observer.

Albemarle and Stanly County are served by two local radio stations, WSPC at 1010 AM with a news/talk format, and WZKY at 1580 AM with an oldies music format. Both are owned by Stanly Communications, Inc. WSPC was previously known as WABZ AM in a former bank at 108 East North Street, across the street from the First Baptist Church.

Television stations available are from the Charlotte Designated Market Area, which Stanly County and Albemarle are a part of. Additionally, the local cable provider carries one station from Greensboro, WFMY-TV.

== Notable people ==
- Denico Autry, football defensive end for the Houston Texans of the NFL; he attended Albemarle High School
- W. Horace Carter, Pulitzer Prize-winning journalist
- Louis Cato, multi-instrumentalist and bandleader of The Late Show Band, the house band for The Late Show with Stephen Colbert
- Willie Drye, journalist and author
- Woody Durham, radio play-by-play announcer for the Carolina Tar Heels; started his radio career at radio station WZKY 1580 AM in Albemarle
- Stuart Daniel Baker, better known as Unknown Hinson, musician and voice actor
- Danny Kepley, former all-star linebacker for the Canadian Football League Edmonton Eskimos; member of the Canadian Football Hall of Fame
- T.A. McLendon, football running back, holds several national high school records; starred for the North Carolina State Wolfpack; played at Albemarle High School
- Monty Montgomery, former Major League Baseball player
- Kellie Pickler, 2006 American Idol contestant; country recording artist; three-time Stanly County AIDS Rodeo for Charity Champion (2002–2004); Season 16 winner of Dancing with the Stars (2013)
- Tommy Smith, former Major League Baseball player
- June Tyson, musician-singer and first female member of Sun Ra and his Arkestra
- Rhett Lowder, professional baseball player in the Cincinnati Reds organization, 7th overall pick in the 2023 MLB Draft

== See also ==
- USS Albemarle (AV-5)
