= Mount Airy Township, Surry County, North Carolina =

Township in Surry County, North Carolina, U.S.

Coordinates: 36.5192688°N 80.610489°W

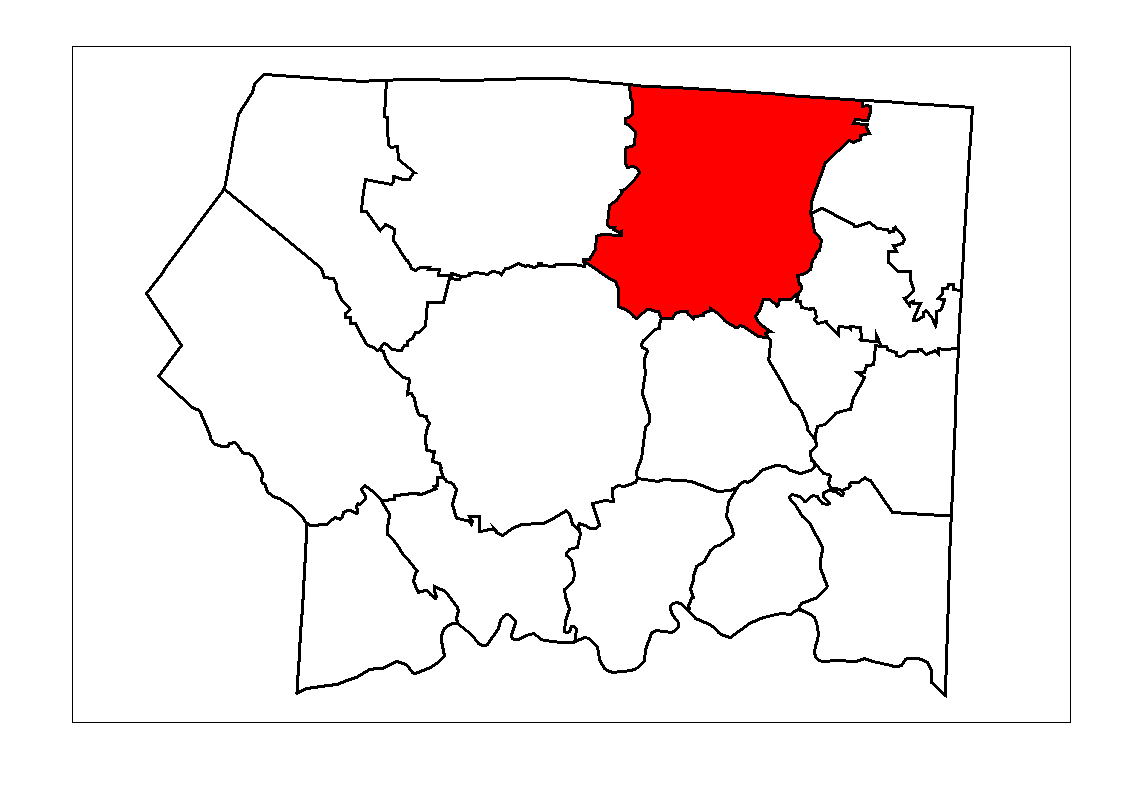
Location of Mount Airy Township in Surry County, N.C.

Mount Airy Township is one of fifteen townships in Surry County, North Carolina, United States. The township had a population of 23,750 according to the 2020 census.

Geographically, Mount Airy Township occupies 43.1 square miles (112 km^{2}) in northern Surry County, with its northern border being with the state of Virginia. Mount Airy Township is the most populated township of Surry County, accounting for nearly 35% of the total county population. There are multiple unincorporated communities located here, including Bannertown, Boones Hill, Flat Rock, Franklin, Holly Springs, Salem, Sheltontown, Slate Mountain, Toast, White Plains, and White Sulphur Springs.

The township surrounds the city of Mount Airy and includes the census-designated places of Flat Rock, Toast, and White Plains. U.S. Route 52 bypasses the city to the west and hosts much of the area's retail activity, including hotels, restaurants, and the Mayberry Mall. Interstate 74 passes through the southern side of Mount Airy Township, which is in the Winston-Salem/Greensboro Combined MSA.
