= Whittier Creek (Bull Creek tributary) =

Stream in North Carolina, USA

Whittier Creek Tributary to Bull Creek
- Location of Whittier Creek mouth Whittier Creek (Bull Creek tributary) (the United States)

Location
- Country: United States
- State: North Carolina
- County: Surry

Physical characteristics
- Source: Beaver Creek divide
  - location: Blackwater, North Carolina
  - coordinates: 36°23′41″N 080°37′11″W
  - elevation: 1,200 ft (370 m)
- Mouth
  - location: about 2 miles south of Ash Hill, North Carolina
  - coordinates: 36°22′37″N 080°34′34″W
  - elevation: 925 ft (282 m)
- Length: 3.85 mi (6.20 km)
- Basin size: 7.11 square miles (18.4 km^{2})
- Discharge
  - location: Bull Creek
  - average: 10.34 cu ft/s (0.293 m^{3}/s) at mouth with Bull Creek

Basin features
- Progression: Bull Creek → Ararat River → Yadkin River → Pee Dee River → Winyah Bay → Atlantic Ocean
- River system: Yadkin River
- Tributaries
  - left: unnamed tributaries
  - right: unnamed tributaries
- Bridges: Key Road, Rock Hill Church, Nurse Road

Whittier Creek is a 3.85 mi (6.20 km) long 2nd order tributary to Bull Creek in Surry County, North Carolina.

== Variant names ==
According to the Geographic Names Information System, it has also been known historically as:

- Whittaker Creek

== Course ==
Whittier Creek rises about 2 miles south of Ash Hill, North Carolina, in Surry County and then flows south and east to join Bull Creek at Blackwater.

== Watershed ==
Whittier Creek drains 7.11 square miles (18.4 km^{2}) of area, receives about 47.9 in/year of precipitation, has a wetness index of 372.49, and is about 37% forested.

== See also ==
- List of Rivers of North Carolina
