= Seed Cane Creek =

Stream in North Carolina, USA

Seed Cane Creek Tributary to Ararat River
- Location of Seed Cane Creek mouth Seed Cane Creek (the United States)

Location
- Country: United States
- State: North Carolina
- County: Surry
- Cities: Sheltontown; Mount Airy

Physical characteristics
- Source: Faulkner Creek divide
  - location: Sheltontown, North Carolina
  - coordinates: 36°29′38″N 080°32′33″W
  - elevation: 1,250 ft (380 m)
- Mouth: Ararat River
  - location: Mount Airy, North Carolina
  - coordinates: 36°28′43″N 080°36′01″W
  - elevation: 979 ft (298 m)
- Length: 3.51 mi (5.65 km)
- Basin size: 2.23 square miles (5.8 km^{2})
- Discharge
  - location: Ararat River
  - average: 3.36 cu ft/s (0.095 m^{3}/s) at mouth with Ararat River

Basin features
- Progression: Ararat River → Yadkin River → Pee Dee River → Winyah Bay → Atlantic Ocean
- River system: Yadkin River
- Tributaries
  - left: unnamed tributaries
  - right: unnamed tributaries
- Bridges: Storm Haven Lane, Reeves Mill Road, Kirkman Road, Wall Street, Oak Avenue, S Main Street, US 52

Seed Cane Creek is a 3.51 mi (5.65 km) long 2nd order tributary to the Ararat River in Surry County, North Carolina.

== Course ==
Seed Cane Creek rises in Sheltontown, North Carolina and then flows southwest to join the Ararat River at Mount Airy.

== Watershed ==
Seed Cane Creek drains 2.23 square miles (5.8 km^{2}) of area, receives about 47.5 in/year of precipitation, has a wetness index of 351.11, and is about 46% forested.

== See also ==
- List of rivers of North Carolina
