= Oldfield Creek (Ararat River tributary) =

Stream in North Carolina, USA

Oldfield Creek Tributary to Ararat River
- Location of Oldfield Creek mouth Oldfield Creek (Ararat River tributary) (the United States)

Location
- Country: United States
- State: North Carolina
- County: Surry

Physical characteristics
- Source: divide of unnamed tributary to Ararat River
  - location: pond about 2 miles northeast of Black Water, North Carolina
  - coordinates: 36°24′38″N 080°36′40″W
  - elevation: 1,220 ft (370 m)
- Mouth: Ararat River
  - location: about 1.5 miles northwest of Ararat, North Carolina
  - coordinates: 36°25′03″N 080°34′10″W
  - elevation: 895 ft (273 m)
- Length: 2.98 mi (4.80 km)
- Basin size: 2.31 square miles (6.0 km^{2})
- Discharge
  - location: Ararat River
  - average: 3.53 cu ft/s (0.100 m^{3}/s) at mouth with Ararat River

Basin features
- Progression: Ararat River → Yadkin River → Pee Dee River → Winyah Bay → Atlantic Ocean
- River system: Yadkin River
- Tributaries
  - left: unnamed tributaries
  - right: unnamed tributaries
- Bridges: Creed Road, Little Mountain Church Road, Creek Lane, Charles Beck Lane, Radar Road

Oldfield Creek is a 2.98 mi (4.80 km) long 2nd order tributary to the Ararat River in Surry County, North Carolina.

== Course ==
Oldfield Creek rises in a pond on the divide of an unnamed tributary to the Ararat River about 2 miles (3.2 km) northeast of Black Water, North Carolina. Oldfield Creek then flows east-northeast to join the Ararat River about 1.5 miles (2.4 km) northwest of Ararat, North Carolina.

== Watershed ==
Oldfield Creek drains 2.31 square miles (6.0 km^{2}) of area, receives about 47.7 inches per year (121 cm/year) of precipitation, has a wetness index of 341.49, and is about 45% forested.

== See also ==
- List of rivers of North Carolina
