= Stoney Creek (Ararat River tributary) =

Stream in North Carolina, USA

Stoney Creek Tributary to Ararat River
- Location of Stoney Creek mouth Stoney Creek (Ararat River tributary) (the United States)

Location
- Country: United States
- State: North Carolina
- County: Surry

Physical characteristics
- Source: Toms Creek divide
  - location: about 2 miles southeast of Sheltontown, North Carolina
  - coordinates: 36°29′07″N 080°31′01″W
  - elevation: 1,400 ft (430 m)
- Mouth: Ararat River
  - location: about 3 miles north of Ararat, North Carolina
  - coordinates: 36°25′41″N 080°34′16″W
  - elevation: 915 ft (279 m)
- Length: 7.10 mi (11.43 km)
- Basin size: 6.46 square miles (16.7 km^{2})
- Discharge
  - location: Ararat River
  - average: 9.56 cu ft/s (0.271 m^{3}/s) at mouth with Ararat River

Basin features
- Progression: Ararat River → Yadkin River → Pee Dee River → Winyah Bay → Atlantic Ocean
- River system: Yadkin River
- Tributaries
  - left: unnamed tributaries
  - right: unnamed tributaries
- Bridges: Jewell Court, Holly Springs Road (x2), Mills Ridge Trail, Mills Road, Reeves Mill Road, US 52, Gospel Time Way, Old US 52, Hiatt Road, I-74

Stoney Creek is a 7.10 mi (11.43 km) long 2nd order tributary to the Ararat River in Surry County, North Carolina.

== Variant names ==
According to the Geographic Names Information System, it has also been known historically as:

- Isaacs Creek
- Stony Creek

== Course ==
Stoney Creek rises on the Toms Creek divide about 2 miles southeast of Sheltontown, North Carolina. Stoney Creek then flows southwest to join the Ararat River about 3 miles north of Ararat, North Carolina.

== Watershed ==
Stoney Creek drains 6.46 square miles (16.7 km^{2}) of area, receives about 47.9 in/year of precipitation, has a wetness index of 354.23, and is about 45% forested.

== See also ==
- List of rivers of North Carolina
