= Flat Shoal Creek (Ararat River tributary) =

Stream in North Carolina, USA

Flat Shoal Creek Tributary to Ararat River
- Location of Flat Shoal Creek mouth Flat Shoal Creek (Ararat River tributary) (the United States)

Location
- Country: United States
- State: North Carolina
- County: Surry

Physical characteristics
- Source: Stoney Creek divide on south side of Chestnut Ridge
  - location: about 4 miles southeast of Sheltontown, North Carolina
  - coordinates: 36°28′11″N 080°30′54″W
  - elevation: 1,438 ft (438 m)
- Mouth: Ararat River
  - location: Ararat, North Carolina
  - coordinates: 36°24′18″N 080°33′42″W
  - elevation: 890 ft (270 m)
- Length: 7.97 mi (12.83 km)
- Basin size: 8.88 square miles (23.0 km^{2})
- Discharge
  - location: Ararat River
  - average: 12.81 cu ft/s (0.363 m^{3}/s) at mouth with Ararat River

Basin features
- Progression: Ararat River → Yadkin River → Pee Dee River → Winyah Bay → Atlantic Ocean
- River system: Yadkin River
- Tributaries
  - left: unnamed tributaries
  - right: unnamed tributaries
- Bridges: Old Farm Trail, Armstrong Road, Simmons Grove Church Road, Simmons Road, Beck Lane, US 52, Old US 52, Long Hill Road, Ararat-Longhill Road

Flat Shoal Creek is a 7.97 mi (12.83 km) long 3rd order tributary to the Ararat River in Surry County, North Carolina.

== Course ==
Flat Shoal Creek rises on the Stoney Creek divide (south side of Chestnut Ridge) about 4 miles southeast of Sheltontown, North Carolina. Flat Shoal Creek then flows south before turning southwest to join the Ararat River at Ararat, North Carolina.

== Watershed ==
Flat Shoal Creek drains 8.88 square miles (23.0 km^{2}) of area, receives about 47.9 in/year of precipitation, has a wetness index of 341.81, and is about 53% forested.

== See also ==
- List of rivers of North Carolina
