= Skin Cabin Creek =

Stream in North Carolina, USA

Skin Cabin Creek Tributary to Ararat River
- Location of Skin Cabin Creek mouth Skin Cabin Creek (the United States)

Location
- Country: United States
- State: North Carolina
- County: Surry

Physical characteristics
- Source: divide of unnamed tributary to Ararat River
  - location: pond at Pine Hill, North Carolina
  - coordinates: 36°21′02″N 080°34′52″W
  - elevation: 1,110 ft (340 m)
- Mouth: Ararat River
  - location: about 3 miles southeast of Pine Hill, North Carolina
  - coordinates: 36°20′01″N 080°32′50″W
  - elevation: 815 ft (248 m)
- Length: 3.34 mi (5.38 km)
- Basin size: 2.84 square miles (7.4 km^{2})
- Discharge
  - location: Ararat River
  - average: 4.10 cu ft/s (0.116 m^{3}/s) at mouth with Ararat River

Basin features
- Progression: Ararat River → Yadkin River → Pee Dee River → Winyah Bay → Atlantic Ocean
- River system: Yadkin River
- Tributaries
  - left: unnamed tributaries
  - right: unnamed tributaries
- Bridges: Stanford Church Road

Skin Cabin Creek is a 3.34 mi (5.38 km) long 1st order tributary to the Ararat River in Surry County, North Carolina. This is the only stream of this name in the United States.

== Course ==
Skin Cabin Creek rises in a pond on the divide of an unnamed tributary to the Ararat River at Pine Hill, North Carolina. Skin Cabin Creek then flows south and then east to join the Ararat River about 3 miles southeast of Pine Hill.

== Watershed ==
Skin Cabin Creek drains 2.84 square miles (7.4 km^{2}) of area, receives about 47.5 in/year of precipitation, has a wetness index of 314.53, and is about 62% forested.

== See also ==
- List of rivers of North Carolina
