= Double Spring Branch (Clarks Creek tributary) =

Stream in Virginia, USA

Double Spring Branch Tributary to Clarks Creek
- Location of Clarks Branch mouth Double Spring Branch (Clarks Creek tributary) (the United States)

Location
- Country: United States
- State: Virginia; North Carolina
- County: Patrick (VA); Surry (NC)

Physical characteristics
- Source: unnamed tributary to Silverleaf Creek divide
  - location: about 5 miles east of Sulphur Springs, North Carolina
  - coordinates: 36°32′42″N 080°31′17″W
  - elevation: 1,400 ft (430 m)
- Mouth
  - location: about 2.5 miles south of The Hollow, Virginia
  - coordinates: 36°34′00″N 080°32′08″W
  - elevation: 1,142 ft (348 m)
- Length: 1.80 mi (2.90 km)
- Basin size: 0.81 square miles (2.1 km^{2})
- Discharge
  - location: Clarks Creek
  - average: 1.41 cu ft/s (0.040 m^{3}/s) at mouth with Clarks Creek

Basin features
- Progression: Clarks Creek → Ararat River → Yadkin River → Pee Dee River → Winyah Bay → Atlantic Ocean
- River system: Yadkin River
- Tributaries
  - left: unnamed tributaries
  - right: unnamed tributaries
- Bridges: Long Branch Road, Persimmon HI

Double Spring Branch is a 1.80 mi (2.90 km) long 1st order tributary to Clarks Creek in Patrick County, Virginia.

== Course ==
Double Spring Branch rises about 5 miles east of Sulphur Springs, North Carolina in Surry County and then flows northwest into Virginia to join Clarks Creek about 1.5 miles south of The Hollow.

== Watershed ==
Double Spring Branch drains 0.81 square miles (2.1 km^{2}) of area, receives about 48.9 in/year of precipitation, has a wetness index of 286.10, and is about 71% forested.

== See also ==
- List of North Carolina Rivers
- List of Virginia Rivers
