= Toms Creek (Ararat River tributary) =

Stream in North Carolina, USA

Toms Creek Tributary to Ararat River
- Location of Toms Creek mouth Toms Creek (Ararat River tributary) (the United States)

Location
- Country: United States
- State: North Carolina
- County: Surry

Physical characteristics
- Source: Big Creek divide
  - location: about 0.25 miles west of Woodville, North Carolina
  - coordinates: 36°30′06″N 080°29′09″W
  - elevation: 1,390 ft (420 m)
- Mouth: Ararat River
  - location: about 5 miles northeast of Pine Hill, North Carolina
  - coordinates: 36°22′27″N 080°32′21″W
  - elevation: 878 ft (268 m)
- Length: 16.10 mi (25.91 km)
- Basin size: 38.44 square miles (99.6 km^{2})
- Discharge
  - location: Ararat River
  - average: 52.95 cu ft/s (1.499 m^{3}/s) at mouth with Ararat River

Basin features
- Progression: Ararat River → Yadkin River → Pee Dee River → Winyah Bay → Atlantic Ocean
- River system: Yadkin River
- Tributaries
  - left: Chinquapin Creek; Heatherly Creek
  - right: unnamed tributaries
- Waterbodies: Loves Lake
- Bridges: Cain Road, Alei Lane, Toms Creek Church Road, Galloway Ridge Trail, Cleo Cain Road, Jessup Grove Church Road, Matthews Road, US 52, W Dodson Mill Road, Cliffside Trail, Toms Creek Road

Toms Creek is a 16.10 mi (25.91 km) long 4th order tributary to the Ararat River in Surry County, North Carolina.

== Course ==
Toms Creek rises on the Big Creek divide about 0.25 miles west of Woodville, North Carolina. Toms Creek then flows south before turning southwest to join the Ararat River at about 5 miles northeast of Pine Hill.

== Watershed ==
Toms Creek drains 38.44 square miles (99.6 km^{2}) of area, receives about 48.1 in/year of precipitation, has a wetness index of 348.20, and is about 58% forested.

== See also ==
- List of rivers of North Carolina
