= Dry Run (Birds Branch tributary) =

Stream in Virginia, USA

Dry Run Tributary to Birds Branch
- Location of Dry Run mouth Dry Run (Birds Branch tributary) (the United States)

Location
- Country: United States
- State: Virginia
- County: Patrick

Physical characteristics
- Source: Doe Run Creek divide
  - location: about 2 miles southwest of Groundhog Mountain
  - coordinates: 36°37′53″N 080°32′58″W
  - elevation: 1,770 ft (540 m)
- Mouth
  - location: about 1 mile west-northwest of Ararat, Virginia
  - coordinates: 36°36′18″N 080°32′10″W
  - elevation: 1,296 ft (395 m)
- Length: 1.89 mi (3.04 km)
- Basin size: 0.57 square miles (1.5 km^{2})
- Discharge
  - location: Birds Branch
  - average: 1.08 cu ft/s (0.031 m^{3}/s) at mouth with Birds Branch

Basin features
- Progression: Birds Branch → Ararat River → Yadkin River → Pee Dee River → Winyah Bay → Atlantic Ocean
- River system: Yadkin River
- Tributaries
  - left: unnamed tributaries
  - right: unnamed tributaries
- Bridges: Twin Oak Road, Doe Run Road, Grogan Branch Lane, Marigold Lane

Dry Run is a 1.89 mi (3.04 km) long 1st order tributary to Birds Branch in Patrick County, Virginia.

== Course ==
Dry Run rises about 2 miles southwest of Groundhog Mountain in Patrick County, Virginia and then flows south-southeast to join Birds Branch about 1 mile west-northwest Ararat.

== Watershed ==
Dry Run drains 0.57 square miles (1.5 km^{2}) of area, receives about 50.8 in/year of precipitation, has a wetness index of 378.73, and is about 45% forested.

== See also ==
- List of Virginia Rivers
