= Bull Creek (Ararat River tributary) =

Stream in North Carolina, USA

Bull Creek Tributary to Ararat River
- Location of Bull Creek mouth Bull Creek (Ararat River tributary) (the United States)

Location
- Country: United States
- State: North Carolina
- County: Surry

Physical characteristics
- Source: Caddle Creek divide
  - location: about 2 miles north of Black Water, North Carolina
  - coordinates: 36°25′05″N 080°37′53″W
  - elevation: 1,360 ft (410 m)
- Mouth: Ararat River
  - location: about 3 miles northeast of Pine Hill, North Carolina
  - coordinates: 36°22′05″N 080°32′33″W
  - elevation: 875 ft (267 m)
- Length: 8.59 mi (13.82 km)
- Basin size: 13.92 square miles (36.1 km^{2})
- Discharge
  - location: Ararat River
  - average: 19.65 cu ft/s (0.556 m^{3}/s) at mouth with Ararat River

Basin features
- Progression: Ararat River → Yadkin River → Pee Dee River → Winyah Bay → Atlantic Ocean
- River system: Yadkin River
- Tributaries
  - left: unnamed tributaries
  - right: Whittier Creek
- Bridges: Mountain Ridge Trail, Siloam Road, Key Road, Waterloo Lane, Golden Acres Lane, Ararat Road, Eldora Road, Bryant Mill Road

Bull Creek is a 8.59 mi (13.82 km) long 2nd order tributary to the Ararat River in Surry County, North Carolina.

== Variant names ==
According to the Geographic Names Information System, it has also been known historically as:

- Bull Run
- Bull Run Creek

== Course ==
Bull Creek rises on the Caddle Creek divide about 2 miles north of Black Water, North Carolina. Bull Creek then flows southeast to join the Ararat River about 3 miles northeast of Pine Hill, North Carolina.

== Watershed ==
Bull Creek drains 13.92 square miles (36.1 km^{2}) of area, receives about 47.8 in/year of precipitation, has a wetness index of 358.20, and is about 43% forested.

== See also ==
- List of rivers of North Carolina
