= Champ Creek =

Stream in North Carolina, US

Champ Creek Tributary to Ararat River
- Location of Champ Creek mouth Champ Creek (the United States)

Location
- Country: United States
- State: North Carolina
- County: Surry

Physical characteristics
- Source: Faulkner Creek divide
  - location: pond about 2 miles east of Mount Airy, North Carolina
  - coordinates: 36°31′27″N 080°35′04″W
  - elevation: 1,270 ft (390 m)
- Mouth: Ararat River
  - location: about 0.5 miles northeast of Mount Airy, North Carolina
  - coordinates: 36°31′09″N 080°35′06″W
  - elevation: 1,035 ft (315 m)
- Length: 3.37 mi (5.42 km)
- Basin size: 2.95 square miles (7.6 km^{2})
- Discharge
  - location: Ararat River
  - average: 4.51 cu ft/s (0.128 m^{3}/s) at mouth with Ararat River

Basin features
- Progression: Ararat River → Yadkin River → Pee Dee River → Winyah Bay → Atlantic Ocean
- River system: Yadkin River
- Tributaries
  - left: unnamed tributaries
  - right: unnamed tributaries
- Bridges: Stardust Trail, Duck Hollow Trail, Arrington Lane, Graystone Road, McBride Road, State Road

Champ Creek is a 3.37 mi (5.42 km) long 1st order tributary to the Ararat River in Surry County, North Carolina. This stream is the only one of its name in the United States.

== Course ==
Champ Creek rises in a pond on the Faulkner Creek divide about 2 miles east of Mount Airy, North Carolina. Champ Creek then flows southwest to join the Ararat River about 0.5 miles northeast of Mount Airy.

== Watershed ==
Champ Creek drains 2.95 square miles (7.6 km^{2}) of area, receives about 47.8 in/year of precipitation, has a wetness index of 337.25, and is about 51% forested.

== See also ==
- List of rivers of North Carolina
