= Combstown, North Carolina =

Unincorporated community in North Carolina, US

Coordinates: 36°30′04″N 80°34′44″W

Combstown is an unincorporated community in Surry County, North Carolina, United States, located on the outskirts of the city of Mount Airy, between Bannertown and Flat Rock.
