= Mount Hermon, North Carolina =

Mount Hermon can refer to:

- Mount Hermon, Alamance County, North Carolina
- Mount Hermon, Pasquotank County, North Carolina

See also:

- Mount Herman, North Carolina
