= Bryan Township, Surry County, North Carolina =

Township in North Carolina, United States

Coordinates: 36.4112856°N 80.8765205°W

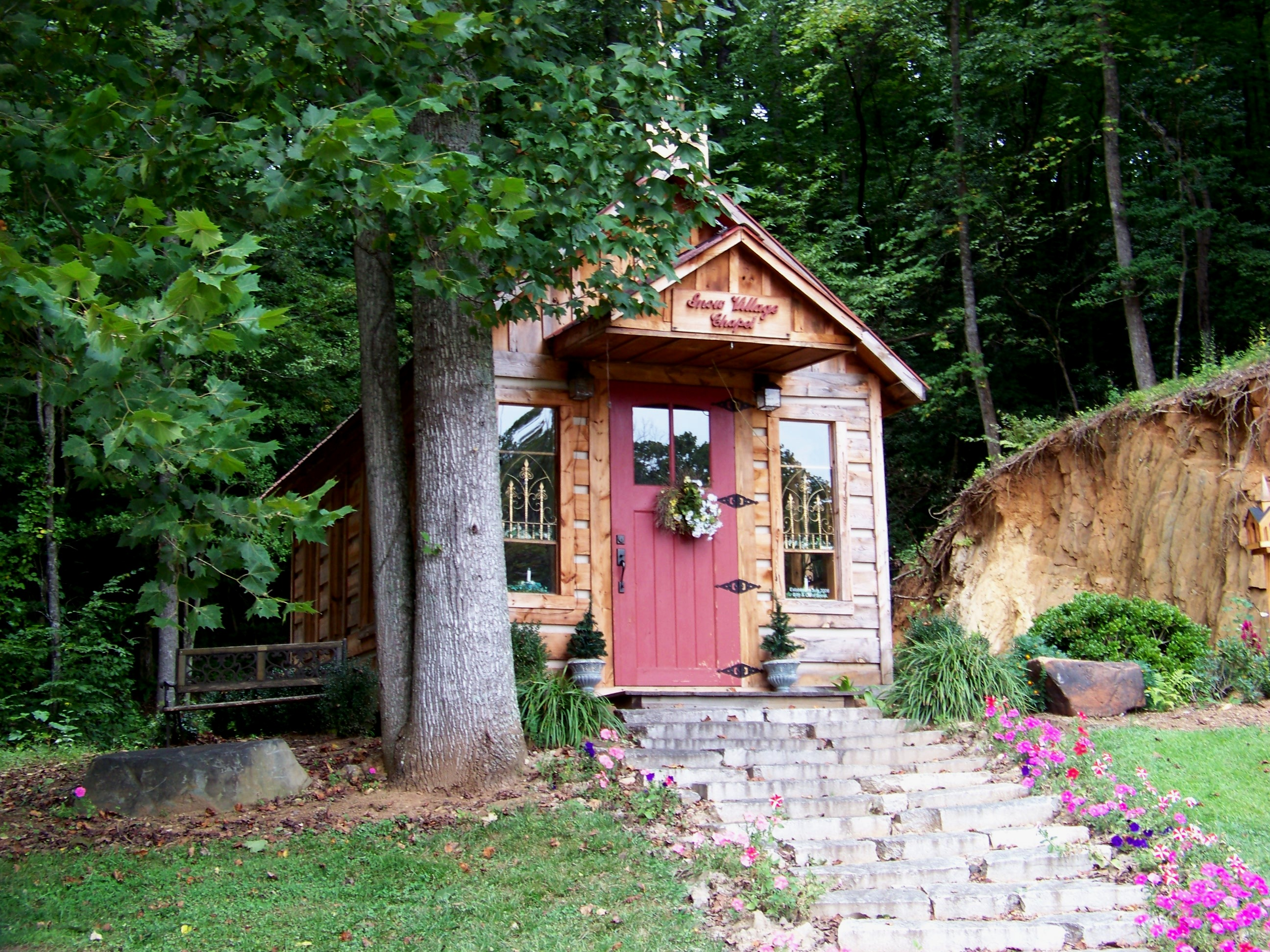
Snow Village Chapel in Bryan Township

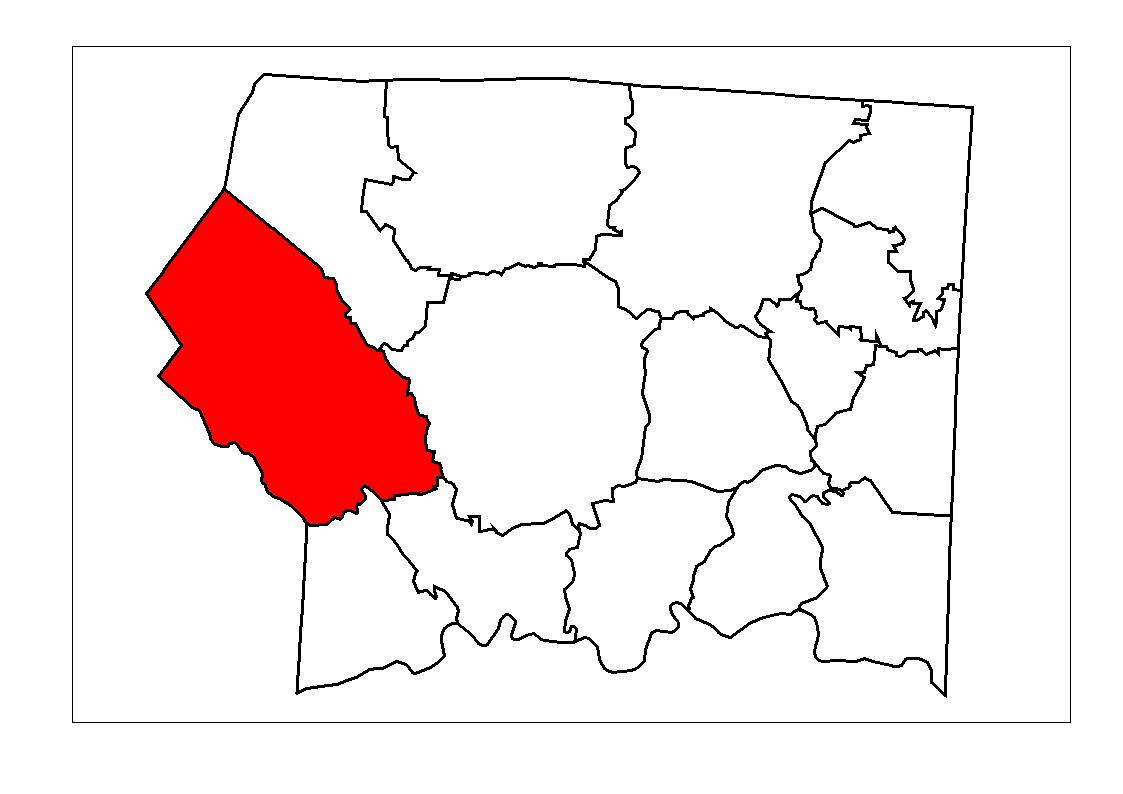
Location of Bryan Township in Surry County, N.C.

Bryan Township is one of fifteen townships in Surry County, North Carolina, United States. The township had a population of 2,276 according to the 2024 ACS 5-year estimates.

Geographically, Bryan Township occupies 70.1 square miles (182 km^{2}) in western Surry County. There are no incorporated municipalities within Bryan Township; however, there are several smaller, unincorporated communities located here, including Devotion, Mountain Park, State Road, Union Hill and Zephyr.
