= East Fork Johnson Creek (Johnson Creek tributary-Virginia) =

Stream in Virginia, USA

East Fork Johnson Creek Tributary to Johnson Creek
- Location of East Fork Johnson Creek mouth East Fork Johnson Creek (Johnson Creek tributary-Virginia) (the United States)

Location
- Country: United States
- State: Virginia
- County: Patrick

Physical characteristics
- Source: Pine Creek divide
  - location: about 2.5 miles southeast of Willis Gap
  - coordinates: 36°39′06″N 080°33′14″W
  - elevation: 2,720 ft (830 m)
- Mouth
  - location: about 6 miles south of Orchard Gap
  - coordinates: 36°36′29″N 080°36′21″W
  - elevation: 1,270 ft (390 m)
- Length: 4.85 mi (7.81 km)
- Basin size: 6.46 square miles (16.7 km^{2})
- Discharge
  - location: Johnson Creek
  - average: 11.84 cu ft/s (0.335 m^{3}/s) at mouth with Johnson Creek

Basin features
- Progression: Johnson Creek → Ararat River → Yadkin River → Pee Dee River → Winyah Bay → Atlantic Ocean
- River system: Yadkin River
- Tributaries
  - left: unnamed tributaries
  - right: unnamed tributaries
- Bridges: Valley End Road, Willis Gap Road, Old School House Road, Ahart Ridge Road

East Fork Johnson Creek is a 4.85 mi (7.81 km) long 2nd order tributary to Johnson Creek in Patrick County, Virginia.

== Course ==
East Fork Johnson Creek rises about 2.5 miles southeast of Willis Gap in Patrick County, Virginia and then flows southwest to join Johnson Creek about 6 miles south of Orchard Gap.

== Watershed ==
East Fork Johnson Creek drains 6.46 square miles (16.7 km^{2}) of area, receives about 51.6 in/year of precipitation, has a wetness index of 289.99, and is about 82% forested.

== See also ==
- List of Virginia Rivers
