= Flat Rock, North Carolina =

Flat Rock is the name of some places in the U.S. state of North Carolina:

- Flat Rock, Henderson County, North Carolina (village)
- Flat Rock, Stokes County, North Carolina (unincorporated)
- Flat Rock, Surry County, North Carolina (census-designated place)
