= Owens Branch (Ararat River tributary) =

Stream in Virginia, USA

Owens Branch Tributary to Ararat River
- Location of Owens Branch mouth Owens Branch (Ararat River tributary) (the United States)

Location
- Country: United States
- State: Virginia
- County: Patrick

Physical characteristics
- Source: Doe Run Creek divide
  - location: about 4 miles northwest of The Hollow, Virginia
  - coordinates: 36°37′24″N 080°34′24″W
  - elevation: 1,880 ft (570 m)
- Mouth: Ararat River
  - location: about 1 mile west of The Hollow, Virginia
  - coordinates: 36°35′00″N 080°33′25″W
  - elevation: 1,178 ft (359 m)
- Length: 4.06 mi (6.53 km)
- Basin size: 3.20 square miles (8.3 km^{2})
- Discharge
  - location: Ararat River
  - average: 5.33 cu ft/s (0.151 m^{3}/s) at mouth with Ararat River

Basin features
- Progression: Ararat River → Yadkin River → Pee Dee River → Winyah Bay → Atlantic Ocean
- River system: Yadkin River
- Tributaries
  - left: unnamed tributaries
  - right: unnamed tributaries
- Bridges: Green Spring Road, Friends Mission Road, Farmers Road, The Hollow Road

Owens Branch is a 4.06 mi (6.53 km) long 2nd order tributary to the Ararat River in Patrick County, Virginia.

== Course ==
Owens Branch rises on the Doe Run Creek divide about 4 miles northwest of The Hollow in Patrick County. Owens Branch then follows a southerly course to join the Ararat River about 1 mile west of The Hollow, Virginia.

== Watershed ==
Owens Branch drains 3.20 square miles (8.3 km^{2}) of area, receives about 49.3 in/year of precipitation, has a wetness index of 312.67, and is about 62% forested.

== See also ==
- List of rivers of Virginia
