= Holly Springs, Surry County, North Carolina =

Holly Springs
- Unincorporated community
- Location within the state of North Carolina
- Coordinates: 36°28′09″N 80°32′23″W
- Country: United States
- State: North Carolina
- County: Surry
- Elevation: 1,322 ft (403 m)
- Time zone: UTC-5 (Eastern (EST))
  - Summer (DST): UTC-4 (EDT)
- ZIP codes: 27030 (Mount Airy)
- Area code: 336
- GNIS feature ID: 2710673

Holly Springs is an unincorporated community located in the Mount Airy Township of Surry County, North Carolina, United States. The community is generally centered on the intersection of Holly Springs Road and Reeves Mill Road, southeast of Bannertown. The Mount Airy/Surry County Airport is located in Holly Springs. Other prominent landmarks include Holly Springs Baptist Church and a Bannertown Volunteer Fire Department substation.
