= Long Branch (Clarks Creek tributary) =

Stream in Virginia, USA

Long Branch Tributary to Clarks Creek
- Location of Long Branch mouth Long Branch (Clarks Creek tributary) (the United States)

Location
- Country: United States
- State: Virginia
- County: Patrick

Physical characteristics
- Source: Silverleaf Creek divide
  - location: about 3 miles southeast of Ararat, Virginia
  - coordinates: 36°34′12″N 080°29′54″W
  - elevation: 1.490 ft (0.454 m)
- Mouth
  - location: about 1.5 miles south of The Hollow
  - coordinates: 36°34′00″N 080°31′50″W
  - elevation: 1,160 ft (350 m)
- Length: 2.35 mi (3.78 km)
- Basin size: 1.59 square miles (4.1 km^{2})
- Discharge
  - location: Clarks Creek
  - average: 2.78 cu ft/s (0.079 m^{3}/s) at mouth with Clarks Creek

Basin features
- Progression: Clarks Creek → Ararat River → Yadkin River → Pee Dee River → Winyah Bay → Atlantic Ocean
- River system: Yadkin River
- Tributaries
  - left: unnamed tributaries
  - right: unnamed tributaries
- Bridges: Long Branch Road

Long Branch is a 2.35 mi (3.78 km) long 1st order tributary to Clarks Creek in Patrick County, Virginia.

== Course ==
Long Branch rises about 1.5 miles south of The Hollow in Patrick County, Virginia and then flows generally east to join Clarks Creek about 3 miles southeast of Ararat.

== Watershed ==
Long Branch drains 1.58 square miles (4.1 km^{2}) of area, receives about49.5 in/year of precipitation, has a wetness index of 280.40, and is about 72% forested.

== See also ==
- List of Virginia Rivers
