= Long Hill Township, Surry County, North Carolina =

Township in Surry County, North Carolina, U.S.

Coordinates: 36.4166012°N 80.5327324°W

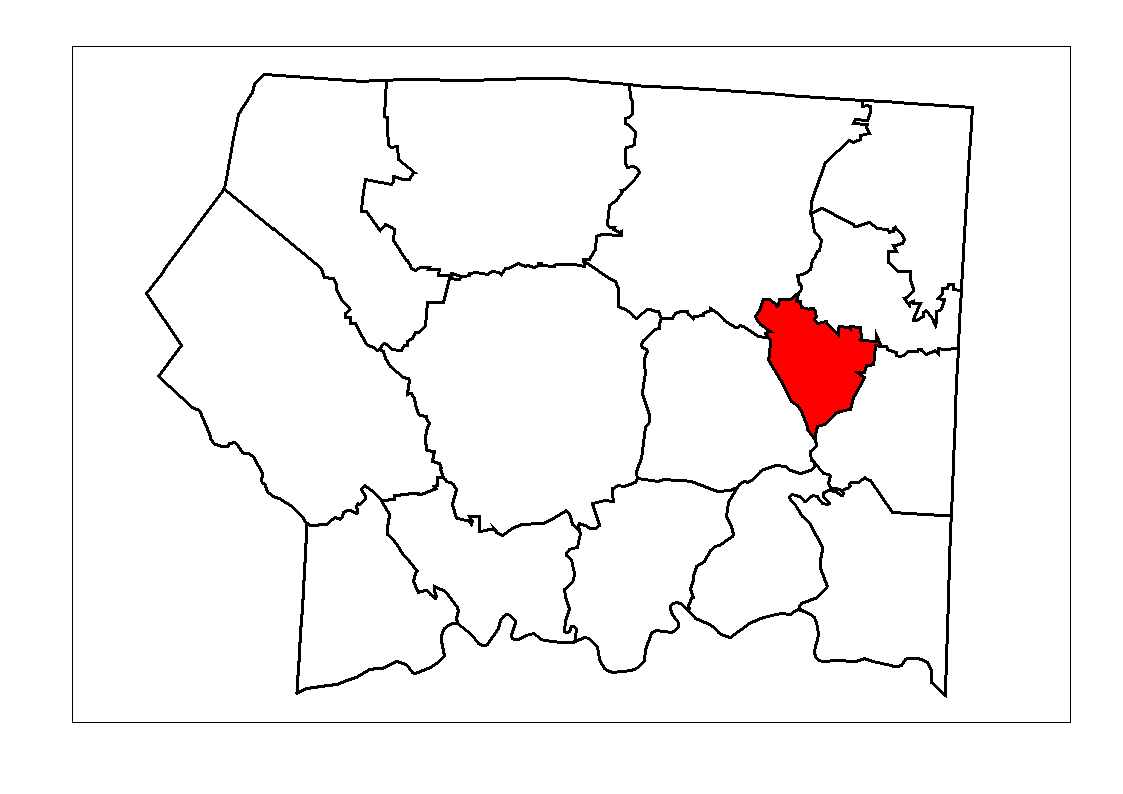
Location of Long Hill Township in Surry County, N.C.

Long Hill Township is one of fifteen townships in Surry County, North Carolina, United States. The township had a population of 1,735 according to the 2020 census.

Geographically, Long Hill Township occupies 11.9 square miles (31 km^{2}) in eastern Surry County. Long Hill Township is separated from Eldora Township on the west by the Ararat River. There are no incorporated municipalities within Long Hill Township, however there are several smaller, unincorporated communities located here, including, Ararat and Long Hill.
