= Johnson Creek (Ararat River tributary) =

Stream in North Carolina, USA

Johnson Creek Tributary to Ararat River
- Location of Johnson Creek mouth Johnson Creek (Ararat River tributary) (the United States)

Location
- Country: United States
- State: North Carolina; Virginia
- County: Surry; Patrick (VA); Carroll

Physical characteristics
- Source: Grassy Creek divide
  - location: Orchard Gap, Virginia
  - coordinates: 36°39′19″N 080°35′33″W
  - elevation: 2,620 ft (800 m)
- Mouth: Ararat River
  - location: about 0.1 miles southwest of Sulphur Springs, North Carolina
  - coordinates: 36°32′10″N 080°34′51″W
  - elevation: 1,050 ft (320 m)
- Length: 10.71 mi (17.24 km)
- Basin size: 18.60 square miles (48.2 km^{2})
- Discharge
  - location: Ararat River
  - average: 30.06 cu ft/s (0.851 m^{3}/s) at mouth with Ararat River

Basin features
- Progression: Ararat River → Yadkin River → Pee Dee River → Winyah Bay → Atlantic Ocean
- River system: Yadkin River
- Tributaries
  - left: East Fork Johnson Creek
  - right: unnamed tributaries
- Bridges: Volunteer Gap Trail, Orchard View Drive, E Fork Road, Johnson Creek Road, Riverside Drive

Johnson Creek is a 10.71 mi (17.24 km) long 2nd order tributary to the Ararat River in Surry County, North Carolina.

== Variant names ==
According to the Geographic Names Information System, it has also been known historically as:

- Johnstons Creek

== Course ==
Johnson Creek rises on the Grassy Creek divide at Orchard Gap in Carroll County, Virginia. Johnson Creek then flows south-southeast into Patrick County, Virginia and continues to Surry County, North Carolina to join the Ararat River about 0.1 miles southwest of Sulphur Springs.

== Watershed ==
Johnson Creek drains 18.60 square miles (48.2 km^{2}) of area, receives about 50.0 in/year of precipitation, has a wetness index of 305.34, and is about 71% forested.

== See also ==
- List of rivers of North Carolina
