= Rutledge Creek (Ararat River tributary) =

Stream in North Carolina, USA

Rutledge Creek Tributary to Ararat River
- Location of Rutledge Creek mouth Rutledge Creek (Ararat River tributary) (the United States)

Location
- Country: United States
- State: North Carolina
- County: Surry

Physical characteristics
- Source: Silverleaf Creek divide
  - location: about 0.5 miles southwest of Slate Mountain Church
  - coordinates: 36°31′57″N 080°30′55″W
  - elevation: 1,600 ft (490 m)
- Mouth: Ararat River
  - location: about 3 miles southeast of Mount Airy, North Carolina
  - coordinates: 36°27′12″N 080°34′54″W
  - elevation: 957 ft (292 m)
- Length: 9.17 mi (14.76 km)
- Basin size: 8.35 square miles (21.6 km^{2})
- Discharge
  - location: Ararat River
  - average: 12.67 cu ft/s (0.359 m^{3}/s) at mouth with Ararat River

Basin features
- Progression: Ararat River → Yadkin River → Pee Dee River → Winyah Bay → Atlantic Ocean
- River system: Yadkin River
- Tributaries
  - left: unnamed tributaries
  - right: unnamed tributaries
- Bridges: Blue Hollow Road, Palm Tree Lane, Blues Creek Trail, Rutledge Trail, NC 89, Reeves Mill Road, US 52

Rutledge Creek is a 9.17 mi (14.76 km) long 2nd order tributary to the Ararat River in Surry County, North Carolina.

== Course ==
Rutledge Creek rises on the Silverleaf Creek divide about 0.5 miles southwest of Slate Mountain Church and then flows southwest to join the Ararat River about 3 miles southeast of Mount Airy, North Carolina.

== Watershed ==
Rutledge Creek drains 8.35 square miles (21.6 km^{2}) of area, receives about 48.2 in/year of precipitation, has a wetness index of 317.01, and is about 63% forested.

== See also ==
- List of rivers of North Carolina
