= Ash Hill, North Carolina =

Unincorporated community in North Carolina, US

Coordinates: 36°23′35″N 80°34′23″W

Ash Hill is an unincorporated community in the Eldora Township of Surry County, North Carolina, United States. The community is generally on the opposite side of the Ararat River from the community of Ararat and is roughly centered on Ararat Road between Eldora Road and Little Mountain Church Road. A school named Ash Hill was formerly located here.
