= Devotion, North Carolina =

Unincorporated community in North Carolina, US

Coordinates: 36°25′59″N 80°55′05″W

Devotion is an unincorporated community in the Bryan Township of western Surry County, North Carolina, United States. Devotion is situated on the Mitchell River, and is the site of a large (100 square miles (260 km^{2})) family estate owned by members of the R. J. Reynolds family (Powell 1968, p. 142).

Devotion, historically also known as Long Creek Farm or Long Creek Lodge, is a historic private mountain estate located near the community of Devotion in Surry and Alleghany counties, North Carolina. Developed during the 1930s by Richard Joshua "Dick" Reynolds Jr. (1906–1964) and his wife Elizabeth Dillard Reynolds ("Blitz"), the estate ultimately encompassed nearly 10,000 acres and is recognized for its Rustic Revival architecture, hydroelectric engineering, integrated agricultural systems, and association with the Reynolds family.

== History ==
During the Great Depression, Richard Joshua "Dick" Reynolds Jr., eldest son of tobacco industrialist Richard Joshua Reynolds and Katharine Smith Reynolds, assembled thousands of acres of mountain land surrounding Long Creek in northwestern North Carolina. Beginning in the early 1930s, Reynolds transformed the property into a large mountain estate designed around agriculture, conservation, engineering, and recreation.

Construction continued throughout the decade and employed hundreds of craftsmen, engineers, stone masons, carpenters, foresters, farmers, and laborers. Buildings and infrastructure were constructed largely from materials harvested or quarried on the property, including native stone and timber.

Architectural historians Noah Reynolds and Kathryn Reynolds, both grandchildren of Richard Joshua "Dick" Reynolds Jr. describe Devotion as an intentionally planned, largely self-sustaining mountain community incorporating hydroelectric power generation, agriculture, forestry, trout hatcheries, workshops, employee housing, and recreational facilities into a unified estate.

The estate included a hydroelectric dam and powerhouse, grain mill, dairy, cheese-making facilities, trout hatcheries, poultry houses, livestock operations, carpenter and woodworking shops, machine shops, post office, general store, employee residences, lakes, roads, bridges, and extensive managed forests.

Contemporary newspaper accounts from the 1930s and 1940s document the estate's commercial agricultural operations, including poultry, livestock, and farm products marketed under the Long Creek Lodge name.

== Reynolds family ownership ==
Richard Joshua "Dick" Reynolds Jr. died in 1964. Following the deaths of Dick Reynolds and Elizabeth Dillard Reynolds, ownership of Devotion was divided among their four sons:

- Richard Joshua "Josh" Reynolds III
- John Dillard Reynolds
- Zachary Taylor Reynolds
- William Neal Reynolds II

Over subsequent decades, portions of the estate were sold outside the Reynolds family while other sections remained under family ownership.

After Zachary Taylor Reynolds died in an airplane accident on September 4, 1979, his daughter, Kathryn Reynolds, has continued the family's vision of sustainable agriculture with active farming endeavors at the Devotion estate.

== Scientific research ==
Beginning in the early 1980s, under the stewardship of Richard Joshua "Josh" Reynolds III, portions of Devotion became home to independent scientific researchers.

Among the most notable was physician and researcher Andrija Puharich, who resided and conducted research on the estate after being invited by Josh Reynolds. Other researchers associated with Devotion during this period included physicist Dr. Elizabeth Rauscher and William Van Bise.

This period marked a distinct phase in the estate's history unto which the Reynolds’ Family Devotion estate became known as a place supporting independent scientific inquiry and research including; electroculture and other sustainable agricultural farming practices.

== Legacy ==
Devotion remains one of North Carolina's most significant privately developed mountain estates of the twentieth century. The estate is noted for its integration of architecture, engineering, agriculture, forestry, and landscape planning into a unified mountain community. Much of the original infrastructure—including the hydroelectric dam, lakes, bridges, roads, and numerous historic buildings—survives as part of the privately owned estate.

== Other sources ==
- Powell, William S. (1968), The North Carolina Gazetteer: A Dictionary of Tar Heel Places, Chapel Hill: University of North Carolina Press, ISBN 0-8078-1247-1
- Noah Reynolds. Architectural History of Devotion Estate.
- Patrick Reynolds and Tom Shachtman. The Gilded Leaf: Triumph, Tragedy, and Tobacco.
- The Sentinel (Winston-Salem, North Carolina) · Fri, Nov 22, 1940 ·
- Winston-Salem Journal (Winston-Salem, North Carolina) · Sun, Aug 20, 1972
- Winston-Salem Journal (Winston-Salem, North Carolina) Farm Forum · Mon, Dec 20, 1943
- The Charlotte Observer (Charlotte, North Carolina) ’The Millionaire and the Mad Scientist'· Sun, Jan 15, 1995 · Page 85
- Winston-Salem Journal (Winston-Salem, North Carolina) ’The Reynolds Farm; Solitude, Sufficient'· Sun, Sep 24, 1978
