= Boones Hill, North Carolina =

Unincorporated community in North Carolina, US

Coordinates: 36°28′34″N 80°34′30″W

Boones Hill is a small unincorporated community in the Mount Airy Township of northern Surry County, North Carolina, United States, on the outskirts of the city of Mount Airy near Bannertown. The community is centered on the intersection of Business U.S. Highway 52 (South Main Street) and U.S. Highway 52 Bypass (Andy Griffith Parkway) south of Bannertown. Local lore states that Daniel Boone may have lived on this hill or traveled trough the area.
