= Eldora Township, Surry County, North Carolina =

Township in Surry County, North Carolina, U.S.

Coordinates: 36.3905763°N 80.610489°W

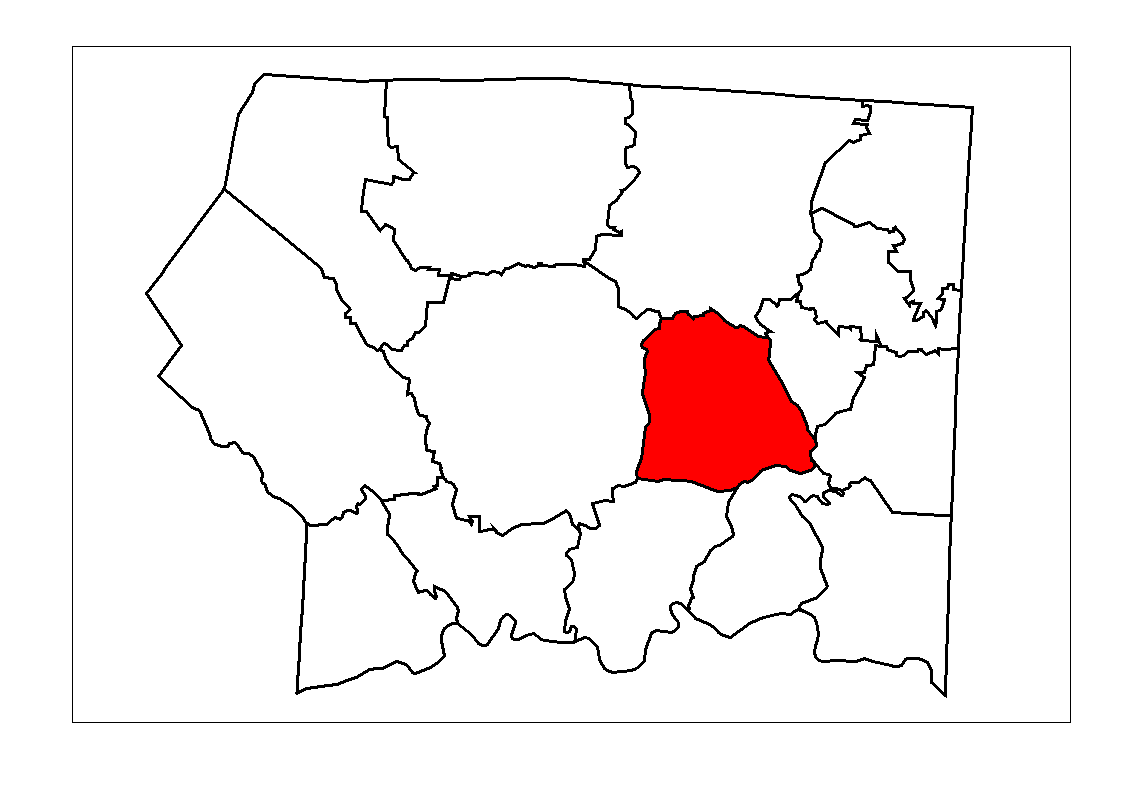
Location of Eldora Township in Surry County, N.C.

Eldora Township is one of fifteen townships in Surry County, North Carolina, United States. The township had a population of 3,659 according to the 2020 census.

Geographically, Eldora Township occupies 30.5 square miles (79 km^{2}) in central Surry County. Eldora Township is separated from Long Hill Township on the east by the Ararat River. There are no incorporated municipalities within Eldora Township; however, there are several smaller, unincorporated communities located here, including Ash Hill, Blackwater and Pine Hill.
