= Pilot Creek (Ararat River tributary) =

Stream in North Carolina, USA

Pilot Creek Tributary to Ararat River
- Location of Pilot Creek mouth Pilot Creek (Ararat River tributary) (the United States)

Location
- Country: United States
- State: North Carolina
- County: Surry

Physical characteristics
- Source: Chinquapin Creek divide
  - location: pond about 0.25 miles southeast of Pilot Mountain, North Carolina
  - coordinates: 36°22′42″N 080°27′08″W
  - elevation: 1,205 ft (367 m)
- Mouth: Ararat River
  - location: about 5 miles east of Pine Hill, North Carolina
  - coordinates: 36°20′53″N 080°31′14″W
  - elevation: 838 ft (255 m)
- Length: 5.44 mi (8.75 km)
- Basin size: 7.19 square miles (18.6 km^{2})
- Discharge
  - location: Ararat River
  - average: 10.28 cu ft/s (0.291 m^{3}/s) at mouth with Ararat River

Basin features
- Progression: Ararat River → Yadkin River → Pee Dee River → Winyah Bay → Atlantic Ocean
- River system: Yadkin River
- Tributaries
  - left: unnamed tributaries
  - right: unnamed tributaries
- Bridges: Snuffbox Lane, Leonard Road, Seven Springs Lane, Sandtrap Lane, US 52, Black Mountain Road, Boyd Nelson Road, Shoals Road, Jim McKinney Road

Pilot Creek is a 5.44 mi (8.75 km) long 2nd order tributary to the Ararat River in Surry County, North Carolina.

== Course ==
Pilot Creek rises in a pond on the Chinquapin Creek divide about 0.25 miles southeast of Pilot Mountain, North Carolina. Pilot Creek then flows southwesterly to join the Ararat River about 5 miles east of Pine Hill, North Carolina.

== Watershed ==
Pilot Creek drains 7.19 square miles (18.6 km^{2}) of area, receives about 47.8 in/year of precipitation, has a wetness index of 325.23, and is about 60% forested.

== See also ==
- List of rivers of North Carolina
