= Faulkner Creek (Ararat River tributary) =

Stream in North Carolina, USA

Faulkner Creek Tributary to Ararat River
- Location of Faulkner Creek mouth Faulkner Creek (Ararat River tributary) (the United States)

Location
- Country: United States
- State: North Carolina
- County: Surry

Physical characteristics
- Source: south side of Slate Mountain
  - location: about 6 miles northeast of Mount Airy, North Carolina
  - coordinates: 36°32′24″N 080°31′02″W
  - elevation: 1,640 ft (500 m)
- Mouth: Ararat River
  - location: Bannertown, North Carolina
  - coordinates: 36°29′38″N 080°35′26″W
  - elevation: 994 ft (303 m)
- Length: 5.98 mi (9.62 km)
- Basin size: 5.24 square miles (13.6 km^{2})
- Discharge
  - location: Ararat River
  - average: 7.92 cu ft/s (0.224 m^{3}/s) at mouth with Ararat River

Basin features
- Progression: Ararat River → Yadkin River → Pee Dee River → Winyah Bay → Atlantic Ocean
- River system: Yadkin River
- Tributaries
  - left: unnamed tributaries
  - right: unnamed tributaries
- Bridges: NC 103 (x3), Quaker Road, Lovers Lane, Welcome Baptist Church Road

Faulkner Creek is a 5.98 mi (9.62 km) long 2nd order tributary to the Ararat River in Surry County, North Carolina.

== Variant names ==
According to the Geographic Names Information System, it has also been known historically as:

- Forkners Creek

== Course ==
Faulkner Creek rises on the south side of Slate Mountain about 6 miles northeast of Mount Airy, North Carolina. Faulkner Creek then flows southwest to join the Ararat River at Bannertown.

== Watershed ==
Faulkner Creek drains 5.24 square miles (13.6 km^{2}) of area, receives about 48.0 in/year of precipitation, has a wetness index of 324.92, and is about 59% forested.

== See also ==
- List of rivers of North Carolina
