= Clarks Creek (Ararat River tributary) =

Stream in Virginia, United States

Clarks Creek Tributary to Ararat River
- Location of Clarks Creek mouth Clarks Creek (Ararat River tributary) (the United States)

Location
- Country: United States
- State: Virginia
- County: Patrick

Physical characteristics
- Source: Fall Creek divide
  - location: Carters Mill, Virginia
  - coordinates: 36°36′30″N 080°28′47″W
  - elevation: 1,440 ft (440 m)
- Mouth: Ararat River
  - location: about 1.5 miles southwest of The Hollow, Virginia
  - coordinates: 36°34′05″N 080°33′01″W
  - elevation: 1,115 ft (340 m)
- Length: 6.39 mi (10.28 km)
- Basin size: 10.80 square miles (28.0 km^{2})
- Discharge
  - location: Ararat River
  - average: 17.76 cu ft/s (0.503 m^{3}/s) at mouth with Ararat River

Basin features
- Progression: Ararat River → Yadkin River → Pee Dee River → Winyah Bay → Atlantic Ocean
- River system: Yadkin River
- Tributaries
  - left: King Noahs Branch; Long Branch; Double Spring Branch; Rye Stack Branch
  - right: unnamed tributaries
- Bridges: Pond Road, Ararat Highway, Homeplace Road, Holly Tree Road, Pedigo Ridge Road, Ararat Highway

Clarks Creek is a 6.39 mi (10.28 km) long 2nd order tributary to the Ararat River in Patrick County, Virginia.

== Course ==
Clarks Creek rises on the Fall Creek divide at Carters Mill in Patrick County, Virginia. Clarks Creek then flows southwest to join the Ararat River about 1.5 miles southwest of The Hollow, Virginia.

== Watershed ==
Clarks Creek drains 10.80 square miles (28.0 km^{2}) of area, receives about 50.0 in/year of precipitation, has a wetness index of 324.21, and is about 62% forested.

== See also ==
- List of rivers of Virginia
