= Birds Branch (Ararat River tributary) =

Stream in Virginia, USA

Birds Branch Tributary to Ararat River
- Location of Birds Branch mouth Birds Branch (Ararat River tributary) (the United States)

Location
- Country: United States
- State: Virginia
- County: Patrick

Physical characteristics
- Source: divide of tributary to Reed Island Creek
  - location: about 1.5 miles west of Groundhog Mountain peak
  - coordinates: 36°38′28″N 080°32′39″W
  - elevation: 2,600 ft (790 m)
- Mouth: Ararat River
  - location: about 1 mile west of Ararat, Virginia
  - coordinates: 36°36′02″N 080°31′50″W
  - elevation: 1,240 ft (380 m)
- Length: 3.06 mi (4.92 km)
- Basin size: 2.00 square miles (5.2 km^{2})
- Discharge
  - location: Ararat River
  - average: 3.88 cu ft/s (0.110 m^{3}/s) at mouth with Ararat River

Basin features
- Progression: Ararat River → Yadkin River → Pee Dee River → Winyah Bay → Atlantic Ocean
- River system: Yadkin River
- Tributaries
  - left: unnamed tributaries
  - right: Dry Run
- Bridges: Doe Run Road, Marigold Lane

Birds Branch is a 3.06 mi (4.92 km) long 2nd order tributary to the Ararat River in Patrick County, Virginia.

== Course ==
Birds Branch rises on the divide of a tributary to Reed Island Creek about 1.5 miles west of the peak of Groundhog Mountain in Patrick County. Birds Branch then flows south to join the Ararat River about 1 mile west of Ararat, Virginia.

== Watershed ==
Birds Branch drains 2.00 square miles (5.2 km^{2}) of area, receives about 52.0 in/year of precipitation, has a wetness index of 326.70, and is about 62% forested.

== See also ==
- List of rivers of Virginia
