= Indian Grove, North Carolina =

Unincorporated community in North Carolina, US

Coordinates: 36°31′08″N 80°26′56″W

Indian Grove is an unincorporated community in the South Westfield Township of northeastern Surry County, North Carolina, United States.

Prominent landmarks in the community include Indian Grove Baptist Church.
