= Salem, Surry County, North Carolina =

Unincorporated community in North Carolina, US

Coordinates: 36°32′17″N 80°36′04″W

Salem is an unincorporated community located in northern Surry County, North Carolina, United States on the outskirts of the city of Mount Airy. The community generally lies between Lovills Creek and the Ararat River (Powell 1968, p. 434). Prominent landmarks include Salem United Methodist Church.
