= Mountain Park, North Carolina =

Mountain Park
- Unincorporated community
- Location within the state of North Carolina
- Coordinates: 36°22′26″N 80°51′18″W
- Country: United States
- State: North Carolina
- County: Surry
- Elevation: 1,276 ft (389 m)
- Time zone: UTC-5 (Eastern (EST))
  - Summer (DST): UTC-4 (EDT)
- ZIP codes: 28676 (State Road)
- Area code: 336
- GNIS feature ID: 1021572

Mountain Park is an unincorporated community located in the Bryan Township of western Surry County, North Carolina. The community's unique name is derived from its "mountain location in a park-like setting." Notable old-time musician and luthier Johnny Gentry is from Mountain Park. The most notable event is the annual Mountain Park Independence Day Celebration that is hosted by the Mountain Park Ruritan Club, which attracts between 1,000-3,000 annually.

== Geography ==
The center of the community is the intersection of Mountain Park Road and Zephyr-Mountain Park Road. Located at the intersection is the former community post office, Mountain Park Baptist Church, Mountain Park Elementary School, and former community store.

Mountain Park is located at 36°22′26″N 80°51′18″W (36.374, -80.855).

== Notable Organizations ==
Aside from Churches, there are four notable organizations who are regularly a part of functions in the community. Mountain Park Elementary School is the only educational facility in the community, and is considered the main communal point for the community. Mountain Park Ruritan Club is responsible for the aforementioned 4 July Celebration, along with others events such as the Christmas Parade. Ruritan Clubs, including the one in Mountain Park, are known for their dedication to community service and beautification of their communities. Mountain Park Rescue Squad is an all-volunteer agency that provides technical rescue services, emergency medical services (EMS), and emergency medical first response to the community. Mountain Park Volunteer Fire Department is responsible for fire suppression in the area, and is Surry County's largest fire district.
