= Long Hill, North Carolina =

Unincorporated community in North Carolina, US

Coordinates: 36°25′01″N 80°31′16″W

Long Hill is a small unincorporated community in the Long Hill Township of Surry County, North Carolina. The community is centered on the intersection of Longhill Road, Ararat Road and Old U.S. Highway 52.

== See also ==
- Long Hill Township
