= White Sulphur Springs, North Carolina =

Unincorporated community in North Carolina, US

Coordinates: 36°32′24″N 80°34′30″W

White Sulphur Springs (sometimes seen as just Sulphur Springs) is an unincorporated community in Surry County, North Carolina, United States on the outskirts of the city of Mount Airy near the Virginia state line. The community sits on the Ararat River and once served as a popular late-nineteenth century resort (Powell 1968, p. 291). The community's name comes from the White Sulphur Springs Hotel that once stood here.
