= Union Hill, North Carolina =

Unincorporated community in North Carolina, US

Coordinates: 36°24′07″N 80°53′20″W

Union Hill is an unincorporated community located in the Bryan Township of western Surry County, North Carolina, United States. It is located between Little Mountain and the south fork of the Mitchell River (Powell 1968, p. 507).
