= Dobson Township, Surry County, North Carolina =

Township in Surry County, North Carolina, U.S.

Coordinates: 36.4010146°N 80.7436141°W

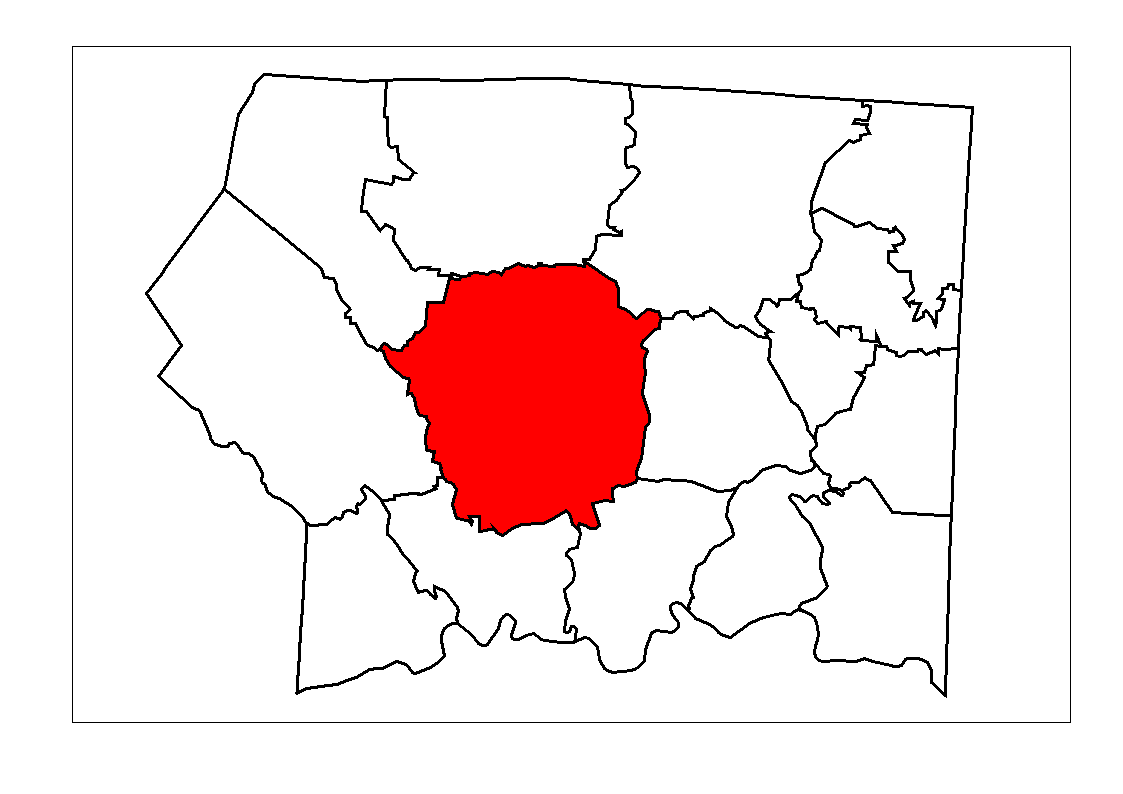
Location of Dobson Township in Surry County, N.C.

Dobson Township is one of fifteen townships in Surry County, North Carolina, United States. The township had a population of 8,367 according to the 2020 census.

Geographically, Dobson Township occupies 69.1 square miles (179 km^{2}) in central Surry County. The only incorporated municipality within Dobson Township is the Town of Dobson, the county seat of Surry County. Additionally, there are several smaller, unincorporated communities located here, including New Hope, Salem Fork and Union Cross. The highest point in Dobson Township is Turner Mountain, elevation 1,275 feet (389 m), which is the site of several communications towers.
