= Old Richmond Township, Forsyth County, North Carolina =

Township in Forsyth County, North Carolina, U.S.

Coordinates: 36.2340692°N 80.3992652°W

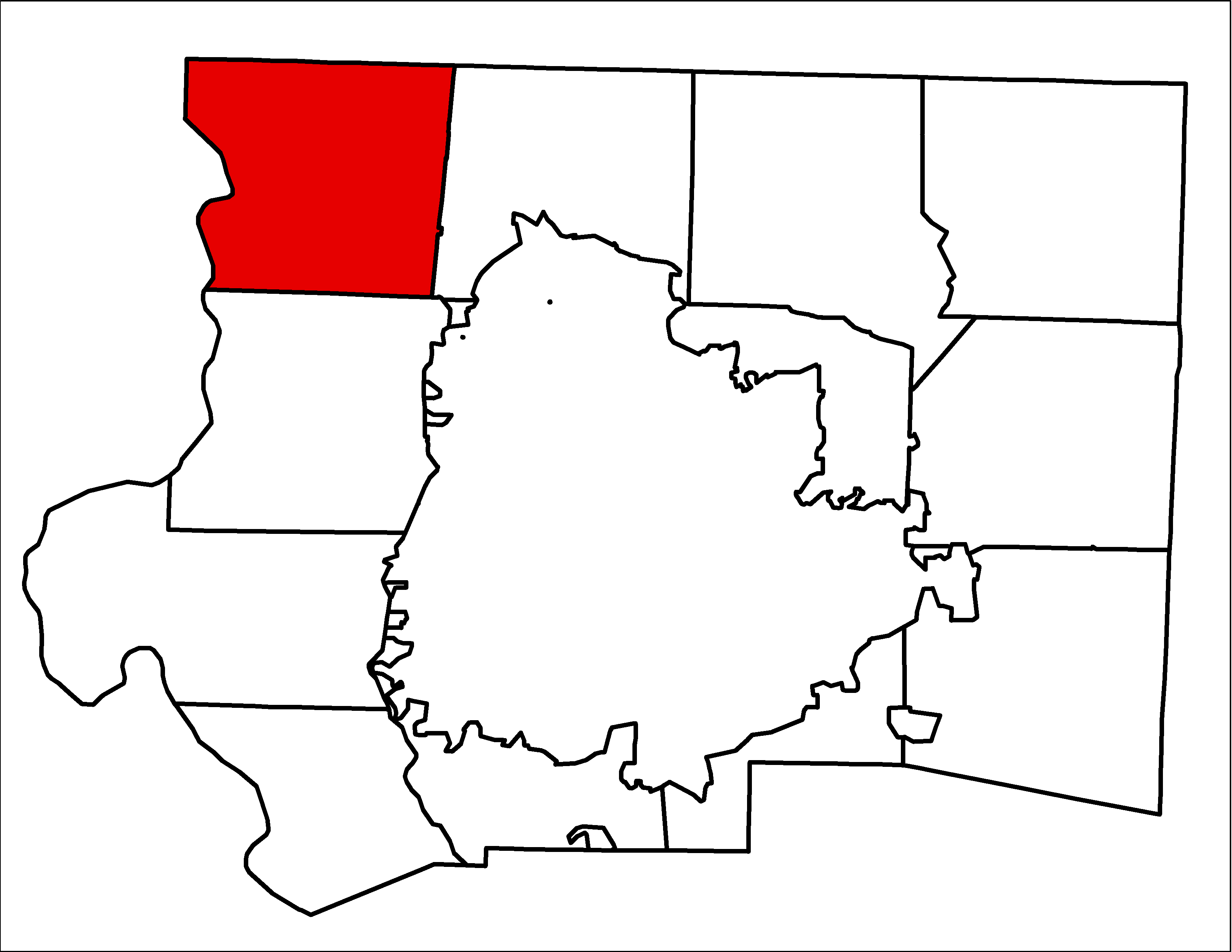
Location of Old Richmond Township in Forsyth County, N.C.

Old Richmond Township is one of fifteen townships in Forsyth County, North Carolina, United States. The township had a population of 5,236 according to the 2010 census.

Geographically, Old Richmond Township occupies 29.60 square miles (76.7 km^{2}) in northwestern Forsyth County. The village of Tobaccoville, North Carolina is located here as well as the unincorporated community of Donnaha. The township fronts the Yadkin River on its western boundary.

A site near Donnaha in Old Richmond Township was briefly the 18th century county seat of a much larger Surry County that once encompassed the area.
