= Shoals Township, Surry County, North Carolina =

Township in North Carolina

Coordinates: 36°18′16″N 80°29′26″W

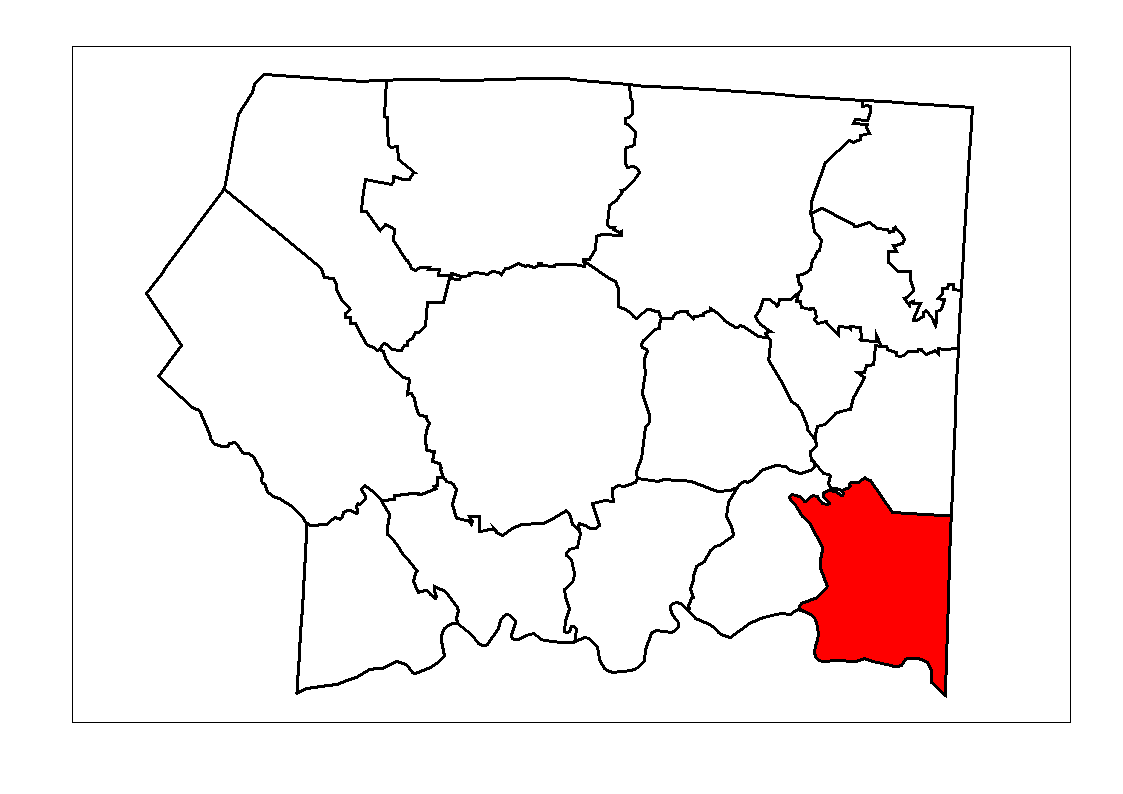
Location of Shoals Township in Surry County, N.C.

Shoals Township is one of 15 townships in Surry County, North Carolina, United States. The township had a population of 1,936 according to the 2020 census.

Geographically, Shoals Township occupies 28.7 square miles (74 km^{2}) in southern Surry County, with its southern border running along the Yadkin River. There are no incorporated municipalities within Shoals Township; however, there are several smaller, unincorporated communities located here, including the community of Shoals.
