= Mount Airy/Surry County Airport =

- IATA: none; ICAO: KMWK; FAA LID: MWK

Summary
- Airport type: Public
- Owner: City of Mount Airy & Surry County
- Serves: Mount Airy, North Carolina
- Elevation AMSL: 1,249 ft / 381 m
- Coordinates: 36°27′35″N 080°33′11″W

Map
- Location of airport in North Carolina

Runways
Direction	Length		Surface
Direction	ft	m	Surface
18/36	4,301	1,311	Asphalt

Statistics (2009)
- Aircraft operations: 17,200
- Based aircraft: 39
- Source: Federal Aviation Administration

Mount Airy/Surry County Airport (ICAO: KMWK, FAA LID: MWK) is a public use airport located in the unincorporated Holly Springs community three nautical miles (6 km) southeast of the central business district of Mount Airy, a city in Surry County, North Carolina, United States. The airport is owned by the city and county. It is included in the National Plan of Integrated Airport Systems for 2011–2015, which categorized it as a general aviation facility.

Although most U.S. airports use the same three-letter location identifier for the FAA and IATA, this airport is assigned MWK by the FAA but has no designation from the IATA (which assigned MWK to Matak-Tarempa Airport in the Anambas Islands, Riau Islands Province, Indonesia). The airport's ICAO identifier is KMWK.

== Facilities and aircraft ==
Mount Airy/Surry County Airport covers an area of 147 acres (59 ha) at an elevation of 1,249 feet (381 m) above mean sea level. It has one runway designated 18/36 with an asphalt surface measuring 5,500 by 75 feet (1,311 x 23 m).

For the 12-month period ending August 6, 2009, the airport had 17,200 aircraft operations, an average of 47 per day: 93% general aviation, 6% air taxi, and 1% military. At that time there were 39 aircraft based at this airport: 85% single-engine, 8% multi-engine, and 8% jet.

== See also ==
- List of airports in North Carolina
