= Donnaha, North Carolina =

- Unincorporated community
- Location within North Carolina Location within the United States
- Coordinates: 36°13′40″N 80°25′58″W
- Country: United States
- State: North Carolina
- County: Forsyth
- Time zone: UTC-5 (Eastern (EST))
  - Summer (DST): UTC-4 (EDT)

Donnaha (sometimes called Donnaha Station) is an unincorporated community along the Yadkin River in the Old Richmond Township of northwest Forsyth County, North Carolina, United States. Donnaha is named for the last chief of the Sauras.

== History ==
Donnaha (sometimes spelled Donnoha) is a Native American village. The name Donnaha was first used in 1889 or 1890 by Dr. Samuel Martin, a descendant of a supposed Cherokee chief, who lived in nearby Winston-Salem, North Carolina (Powell 1968, p. 146). Near Donnaha was the site of the first county seat of Surry County, North Carolina, established at Richmond (now Old Richmond), in 1774 and a courthouse was erected by 1779 (Corbitt 1968, p. 199). However, Stokes County (including modern Forsyth County), was split from Surry County in 1789 and the site was unusable for either county. The respective courts were moved to Rockford for Surry and to Germanton for Stokes. Much later, the courthouse site was destroyed by a cyclone in 1830 (Powell 1968, p. 146). Donnaha was a stop on the former Southern Railway, now used by the Yadkin Valley Railroad.
