= Franklin, Surry County, North Carolina =

Unincorporated community in North Carolina, US

Coordinates: 36°29′20″N 80°38′02″W

Franklin is an unincorporated community in the Mount Airy Township of Surry County, North Carolina, United States, on the outskirts of the city of Mount Airy. The community is located on South Franklin Road just south of Toast. Area landmarks include Franklin Elementary School and Franklin Volunteer Fire Department.
