= Westfield Township, Surry County, North Carolina =

Township in Surry County, North Carolina, U.S.

Coordinates: 36.508648°N 80.4771472°W

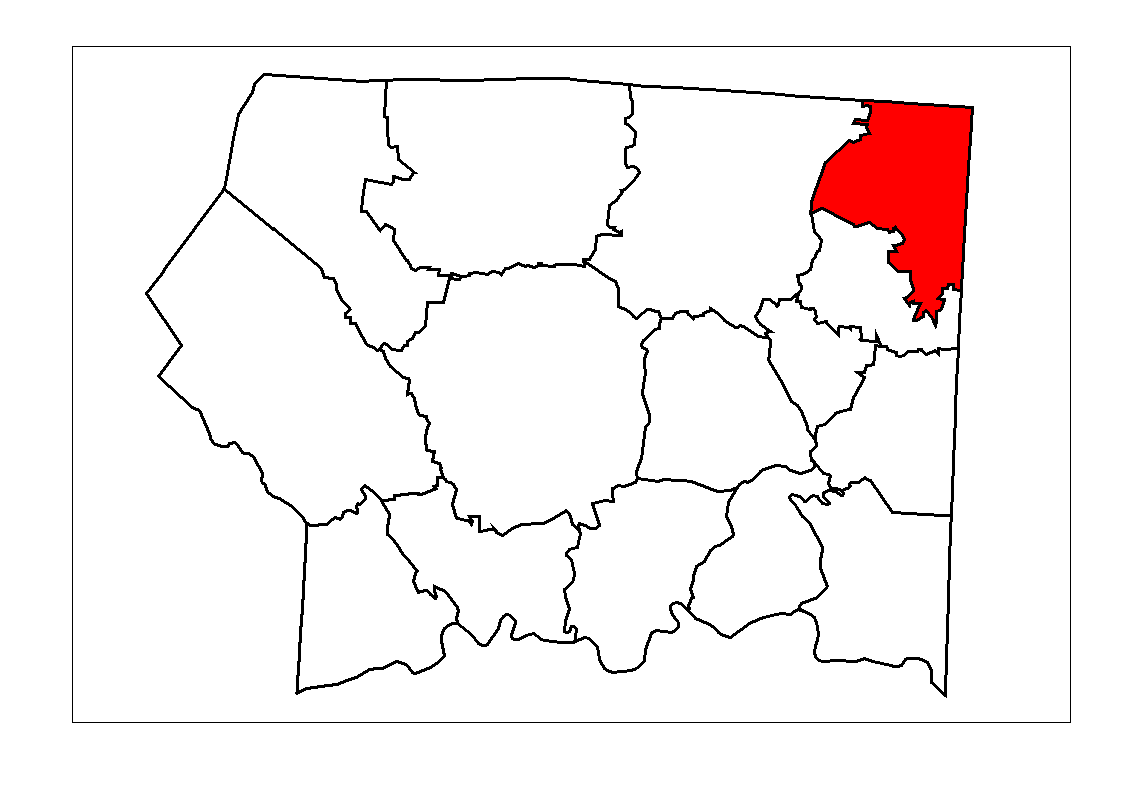
Location of Westfield Township in Surry County, N.C.

Westfield Township is one of fifteen townships in Surry County, North Carolina, United States. The township had a population of 2,372 according to the 2020 census.

Geographically, Westfield Township occupies 27.2 square miles (70 km^{2}) in northeastern Surry County. There are no incorporated municipalities within Westfield Township; however, there are several smaller, unincorporated communities located here, including Albion, Mount Herman, Westfield and Woodville.
