= Union Cross, Surry County, North Carolina =

Unincorporated community in North Carolina, US

Coordinates: 36°20′46″N 80°45′29″W

Union Cross is an unincorporated community in the Dobson Township of central Surry County, North Carolina, United States. The community is roughly centered on the intersection of Dobbins Mill Road and Twin Oaks Road. Prominent landmarks include Union Cross Baptist Church, Union Cross Baptist Church cemetery, the Dockery Family Cemetery, and a local Ruritan club. The land for the Union Cross Ruritan Club was donated to the community for this purpose by Mrs. Minnie Shinault Dockery, widow of T. Alvin Dockery, a prominent local farmer and owner of the local general store. This Community is served by the Jot-Um-Down Volunteer Fire Department, which was founded in 1980.
