= Albion, North Carolina =

Unincorporated community in North Carolina, US

Coordinates: 36°31′08″N 80°26′56″W

Albion is an unincorporated community in the Westfield Township of northeastern Surry County, North Carolina, United States. Prominent landmarks in the community include Albion Missionary Baptist Church—originally built in 1899—and Albion Community Church.
