= South Westfield Township, Surry County, North Carolina =

Township in Surry County, North Carolina, U.S.

Coordinates: 36.4577282°N 80.5105028°W

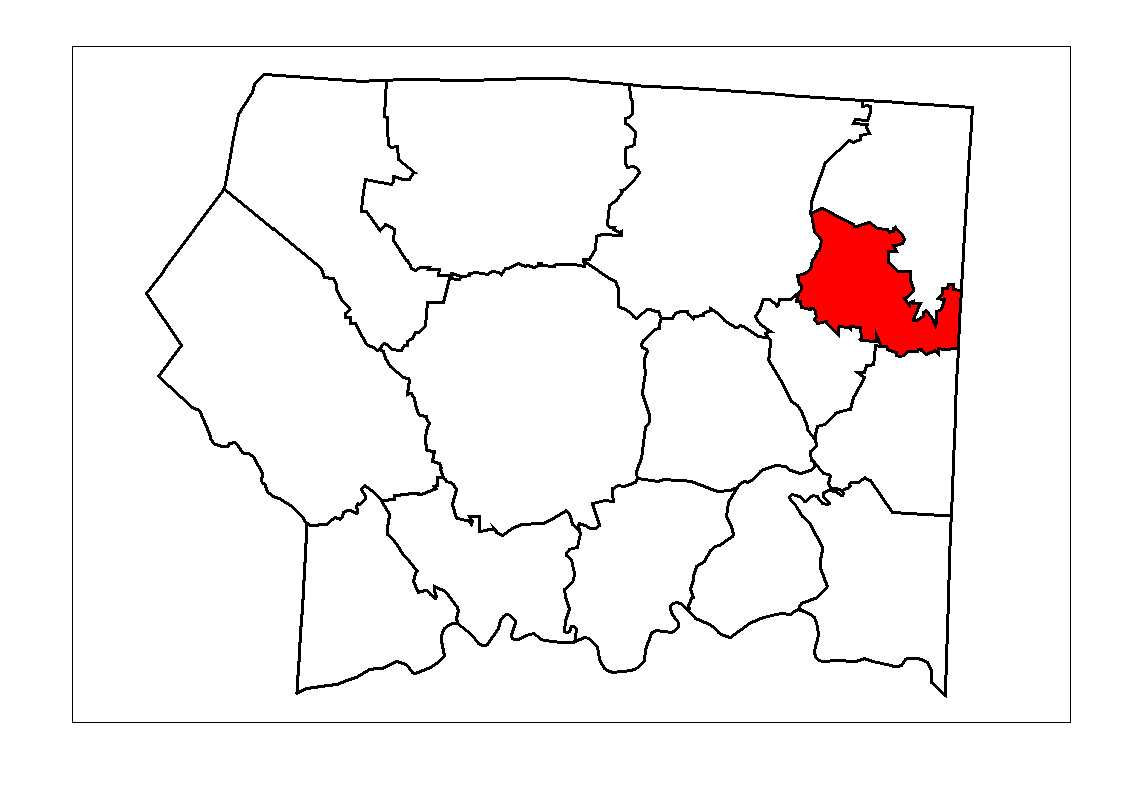
Location of South Westfield Township in Surry County, N.C.

South Westfield Township is one of fifteen townships in Surry County, North Carolina, United States. The township had a population of 2,069 according to the 2020 census.

Geographically, South Westfield Township occupies 17.4 square miles (45 km^{2}) in eastern Surry County. There are no incorporated municipalities within South Westfield Township; however, there are several smaller, unincorporated communities located here, including Indian Grove.
