= White Plains, North Carolina =

- CDP
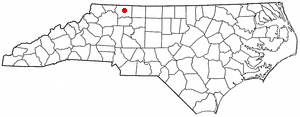
- Location of White Plains, North Carolina
- Coordinates: 36°26′43″N 80°38′06″W
- Country: United States
- State: North Carolina
- County: Surry

Area
  - Total: 4.03 sq mi (10.44 km^{2})
  - Land: 4.01 sq mi (10.39 km^{2})
  - Water: 0.019 sq mi (0.05 km^{2})
- Elevation: 1,132 ft (345 m)

Population (2020)
  - Total: 1,025
  - Density: 256/sq mi (98.7/km^{2})
- Time zone: UTC-5 (Eastern (EST))
  - Summer (DST): UTC-4 (EDT)
- ZIP code: 27031
- Area code: 336
- FIPS code: 37-73460
- GNIS feature ID: 2403023

White Plains is a census-designated place (CDP) in Surry County, North Carolina, United States. As of the 2020 census, White Plains had a population of 1,025.

== Geography ==
According to the United States Census Bureau, the CDP has a total area of 4.1 square miles (11 km^{2}), all of it land.

== Demographics ==
Historical population
Census	Pop.	Note	%±
2020	1,025		—
U.S. Decennial Census

As of the census of 2000, there were 1,049 people, 459 households, and 322 families residing in the CDP. The population density was 257.4 inhabitants per square mile (99.4/km^{2}). There were 506 housing units at an average density of 124.2 per square mile (48.0/km^{2}). The racial makeup of the CDP was 98.28% White, 0.29% African American, 0.10% Native American, 0.29% Asian, 0.19% Pacific Islander, 0.57% from other races, and 0.29% from two or more races. Hispanic or Latino of any race were 0.95% of the population.

There were 459 households, out of which 28.3% had children under the age of 18 living with them, 57.5% were married couples living together, 8.5% had a female householder with no husband present, and 29.8% were non-families. 27.7% of all households were made up of individuals, and 8.9% had someone living alone who was 65 years of age or older. The average household size was 2.29 and the average family size was 2.77.

In the CDP, the population was spread out, with 21.2% under the age of 18, 8.4% from 18 to 24, 28.6% from 25 to 44, 27.4% from 45 to 64, and 14.5% who were 65 years of age or older. The median age was 39 years. For every 100 females, there were 97.9 males. For every 100 females age 18 and over, there were 94.6 males.

The median income for a household in the CDP was $34,079, and the median income for a family was $54,500. Males had a median income of $30,852 versus $25,100 for females. The per capita income for the CDP was $16,284. About 1.9% of families and 7.8% of the population were below the poverty line, including 4.2% of those under age 18 and 27.7% of those age 65 or over.

== Notable people ==
- Eng and Chang Bunker, the original Siamese Twins, lived in Mt Airy and are buried there at White Plains Baptist Church cemetery.
