= Zephyr, North Carolina =

Unincorporated community in North Carolina, US

Coordinates: 36°22′05″N 80°48′50″W

Zephyr in an unincorporated community in western Surry County, North Carolina, United States. The community is centered on the intersection of Zephyr-Mountain Park Road and Poplar Springs Road/Zephyr Road (SR 1001) and lies between the Mitchell River and Little Creek. Prominent landmarks in the center of the community include Gum Orchard Baptist Church and the Zephyr Cemetery.
