= Mount Herman, North Carolina =

Unincorporated community in North Carolina, US

Coordinates: 36°32′02″N 80°28′08″W

Mount Herman is a small unincorporated community in the Westfield Township of northeastern Surry County, North Carolina. Prominent landmarks in the community include Mount Herman United Methodist Church and cemetery.
