= Woodville, Surry County, North Carolina =

Unincorporated community in North Carolina, US

Coordinates: 36°30′07″N 80°28′48″W

Woodville in an unincorporated community located in the Westfield Township of northeast Surry County, North Carolina, United States, near Big Creek. The main thoroughfare through the community is North Carolina Highway 89 (Westfield Road).
