= Kathryn Reynolds =

American poet

Kathryn Taylor Reynolds (born 1977 in Winston-Salem, North Carolina) is an American fine art photographer and artist.

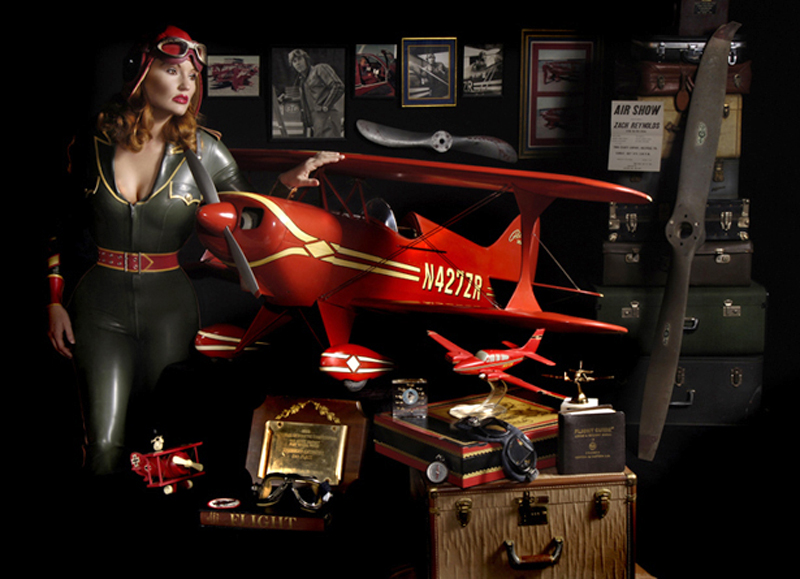
From the series: 'Zach: the Father I Never Knew'. A series of self-portraits by Kathryn Reynolds

== Awards ==
Kathryn Reynolds photography has received numerous awards across the United States, as well as internationally. Reynolds honors have included, receiving awards at the prestigious 'Lucie Awards', 'The International Photography Associations' Annual Photography Competition. awards from Serbin Communications, 'Best of Photography Competition', as well as being named the 'Amateur Advertising Photographer of the Year', in 2004, by The National Photography Association. Her photographs have been exhibited in galleries worldwide and her limited edition prints are sought after by collectors.

== Artwork ==
Reynolds work uses symbols, often in juxtaposition, to explore beauty, archetypes, paradox, the cycles of life, death, and rebirth. She believes we are all on a journey to discover who we are, our deep roots of soul and spirit, as well as what destiny holds for us. Her personal quest for self-exploration, and a deeper understanding of the human condition, is a driving force in her ethereal work. Reynolds fine art photographs have become synonymous with her technical expertise, deep knowledge of the use of visual symbols, and her obsessive attention to the smallest detail.

Reynolds does all of her photographic styling and production, something quite unusual for most photographers. Kathryn Reynolds often appears as the subject in her photographs, using herself as the model, and avatar, to the greater message she is relaying in her artwork. Likened to Cindy Sherman, Reynolds is also a master of changing her image to relay the deeper story, and message, to the viewer. She has also compared herself to Harper Lee on at least one occasion.

== Background ==
Reynolds educational background in, not only photography, but English literature and religious studies, has allowed her to execute complicated photographic tableaux filled with symbolic imagery. Critics such as, the American photographer, Joyce Tenneson, have said, "Reynolds work echoes the poetics of William Blake and Emily Dickinson".

In addition to her fine art photography, Reynolds has also proven herself in the literary community. She has written numerous technical essays, scripts for television and radio, as well as, acting in television commercials, doing voice over work, and hosting her own television show. 'Teen Life Speaks', where Reynolds interviewed high-profile political people, and persons 'of note' in the community. 'Teen Life Speaks' was a featured weekly on PBS television in North Carolina. Reynolds carried this talent into the poetic world, where her iambic pentameter poems, were published in national poetry anthologies.

== Family history ==
Kathryn Taylor Reynolds was born in Winston-Salem, North Carolina. She is the daughter of the American motorcyclist Zachary Taylor Reynolds, granddaughter of Richard Joshua (Dick) Reynolds II, and great-granddaughter of R. J. Reynolds, founder of the R. J. Reynolds Tobacco Company. Kathryn is also the grand-niece, of the pilot and aviation innovator Zachary Smith Reynolds, the founder of Smith Reynolds Airport in Winston-Salem, as well as the charitable organization The Z. Smith Reynolds Foundation.
