= Sheltontown, North Carolina =

Unincorporated community in North Carolina, US

Coordinates: 36°29′35″N 80°33′22″W

Sheltontown (or Shelton Town) is an unincorporated community located along North Carolina Highway 89 (Westfield Road) in northeast Surry County, North Carolina, United States, near the city of Mount Airy, just east of Bannertown. The community generally lies between Rutledge Creek and the Ararat River (Powell 1968, p. 450).
