= Blackwater, North Carolina =

Unincorporated community in North Carolina, US

Coordinates: 36°23′49″N 80°37′26″W

Blackwater (sometimes written as Black Water) is a small unincorporated community in the Eldora Township of Surry County, North Carolina, United States. The community is centered on the intersections of Ararat Road, Crotts Road and Siloam Road. Prominent landmarks include Blackwater Community Church, Blackwater United Methodist Church and the now defunct Blackwater Grocery.
