= Ararat, North Carolina =

Unincorporated community in North Carolina, US

Coordinates: 36.404°N 80.561°W

Ararat is an unincorporated community in the Long Hill Township of Surry County, North Carolina, United States. Ararat is situated on, and is named for, the Ararat River (Powell 1968, p. 12). Ararat is along the former Atlantic & Yadkin Railway line from Mount Airy to Rural Hall that is now operated by the Yadkin Valley Railroad. Landmarks near the center of the community include the post office, fire department and area churches.

== Geography ==
Flat Shoal Creek joins the Ararat River here.

== Demographics ==
Ararat's Zip Code Tabulation Area (Zip Code 27007) has a population of about 1,339 as of the 2000 census. The population is 50.2% male and 49.8% female. About 93.2% of the population is white, 1.2% African-American, 0.6% American Indian, 6.9% Hispanic, and 4.3% of other races. 0.7% of people are two or more races. There are no Asians, Native Hawaiians or other Pacific Islanders.

The median household income is $39,085 with 7.4% of the population living below the poverty line.
