= Doe Run Creek (Ararat River tributary) =

Stream in Virginia, USA

Doe Run Creek Tributary to Ararat River
- Location of Doe Run Creek mouth Doe Run Creek (Ararat River tributary) (the United States)

Location
- Country: United States
- State: Virginia
- County: Patrick

Physical characteristics
- Source: Johnson Creek divide
  - location: about 2 miles west of Groundhog Mountain peak
  - coordinates: 36°38′31″N 080°33′14″W
  - elevation: 2,500 ft (760 m)
- Mouth: Ararat River
  - location: about 1 mile northwest of The Hollow, Virginia
  - coordinates: 36°35′25″N 080°32′56″W
  - elevation: 1,188 ft (362 m)
- Length: 3.78 mi (6.08 km)
- Basin size: 2.63 square miles (6.8 km^{2})
- Discharge
  - location: Ararat River
  - average: 4.69 cu ft/s (0.133 m^{3}/s) at mouth with Ararat River

Basin features
- Progression: Ararat River → Yadkin River → Pee Dee River → Winyah Bay → Atlantic Ocean
- River system: Yadkin River
- Tributaries
  - left: Mire Branch
  - right: unnamed tributaries
- Bridges: Logan Bluff, Youngs View Trail, Green Spring Road, Friends Mission Road

Doe Run Creek is a 3.73 mi (6.00 km) long 1st order tributary to the Ararat River in Patrick County, Virginia.

== Variant names ==
According to the Geographic Names Information System, it has also been known historically as:

- Doe Run Baptist Church

== Course ==
Doe Run Creek rises on the Johnson Creek divide about 2 miles west of the Groundhog Mountain peak in Patrick County. Doe Run Creek then flows south to join the Ararat River about 1 mile northwest of The Hollow, Virginia.

== Watershed ==
Doe Run Creek drains 2.63 square miles (6.8 km^{2}) of area, receives about 50.5 in/year of precipitation, has a wetness index of 307.61, and is about 73% forested.

== See also ==
- List of rivers of Virginia
