= Flat Rock, Surry County, North Carolina =

Flat Rock
- Census-designated place
- Location within the state of North Carolina Flat Rock (the United States)
- Coordinates: 36°30′28″N 80°34′47″W
- Country: United States
- State: North Carolina
- County: Surry

Area
  - Total: 2.6 sq mi (6.7 km^{2})
  - Land: 2.6 sq mi (6.7 km^{2})
- Elevation: 1,148 ft (350 m)

Population (2000)
  - Total: 1,690
  - Density: 650/sq mi (250/km^{2})
- Time zone: UTC-5 (Eastern (EST))
  - Summer (DST): UTC-4 (EDT)
- ZIP code: 27030
- Area codes: 336 and 743
- GNIS feature ID: 2402487

Flat Rock is a census-designated place (CDP) in Surry County, North Carolina, United States. The name "Flat Rock" stems from the community's granite quarry. The granite quarry is the largest open-face granite quarry in the world, and has been mined continuously since 1889 by the North Carolina Granite Corporation.

== Geography ==
According to the United States Census Bureau, the CDP has a total area of 2.6 square miles (6.7 km^{2}), all land.

== Demographics ==
=== Racial and ethnic composition ===
Flat Rock CDP, North Carolina – Racial and ethnic composition Note: the US Census treats Hispanic/Latino as an ethnic category. This table excludes Latinos from the racial categories and assigns them to a separate category. Hispanics/Latinos may be of any race.
Race / Ethnicity (NH = Non-Hispanic)	Pop 2000	Pop 2010	Pop 2020	% 2000	% 2010	% 2020
White alone (NH)	1,426	1,303	1,021	84.38%	83.74%	77.00%
Black or African American alone (NH)	149	100	88	8.82%	6.43%	6.64%
Native American or Alaska Native alone (NH)	2	5	4	0.12%	0.32%	0.30%
Asian alone (NH)	1	8	2	0.06%	0.51%	0.15%
Native Hawaiian or Pacific Islander alone (NH)	0	0	0	0.00%	0.00%	0.00%
Other race alone (NH)	0	0	0	0.00%	0.00%	0.00%
Mixed race or Multiracial (NH)	19	13	50	1.12%	0.84%	3.77%
Hispanic or Latino (any race)	93	127	161	5.50%	8.16%	12.14%
Total	1,690	1,556	1,326	100.00%	100.00%	100.00%

=== 2000 census ===
As of the census of 2000, there were 1,690 people, 696 households, and 476 families residing in the CDP. The population density was 639.5 inhabitants per square mile (246.9/km^{2}). There were 754 housing units at an average density of 285.3 per square mile (110.2/km^{2}). The racial makeup of the CDP was 86.57% White, 8.82% African American, 0.12% Native American, 0.12% Asian, 3.20% from other races, and 1.18% from two or more races. Hispanic or Latino of any race were 5.50% of the population.

There were 696 households, out of which 26.6% had children under the age of 18 living with them, 52.3% were married couples living together, 11.2% had a female householder with no husband present, and 31.6% were non-families. 28.6% of all households were made up of individuals, and 14.5% had someone living alone who was 65 years of age or older. The average household size was 2.43 and the average family size was 2.99.

In the CDP, the population was spread out, with 22.9% under the age of 18, 7.4% from 18 to 24, 29.1% from 25 to 44, 23.7% from 45 to 64, and 17.0% who were 65 years of age or older. The median age was 39 years. For every 100 females, there were 99.5 males. For every 100 females age 18 and over, there were 95.4 males.

The median income for a household in the CDP was $27,733, and the median income for a family was $34,583. Males had a median income of $24,400 versus $17,750 for females. The per capita income for the CDP was $12,495. About 7.8% of families and 10.9% of the population were below the poverty line, including 7.6% of those under age 18 and 16.2% of those age 65 or over.
