= Pine Hill, North Carolina =

Unincorporated community in North Carolina, US

Coordinates: 36°20′56″N 80°35′24″W

Pine Hill is an unincorporated community in the Eldora Township of Surry County, North Carolina, United States. The community is centered on the intersection of Eldora Road/Quaker Church Road and North Carolina Highway 268. Prominent landmarks in the community include the Pine Hill Friends Meeting and cemetery.
