= Bannertown, North Carolina =

Bannertown
- Unincorporated community
- Location within the state of North Carolina
- Country: United States
- State: North Carolina
- County: Surry
- Time zone: UTC-5 (Eastern (EST))
  - Summer (DST): UTC-4 (EDT)
- GNIS feature ID: 980532

Bannertown is an unincorporated community in Surry County, North Carolina, United States, just outside the city of Mount Airy (Powell 1968, p. 23). The community is centered on the intersection of Business U.S. Highway 52 (S. Main Street) and North Carolina Highway 89 (Westfield Road). Some of the area, specifically from the center of the community to the Ararat River has been annexed by Mount Airy in recent years.
