= Surry County, North Carolina =

County in North Carolina, United States

- County
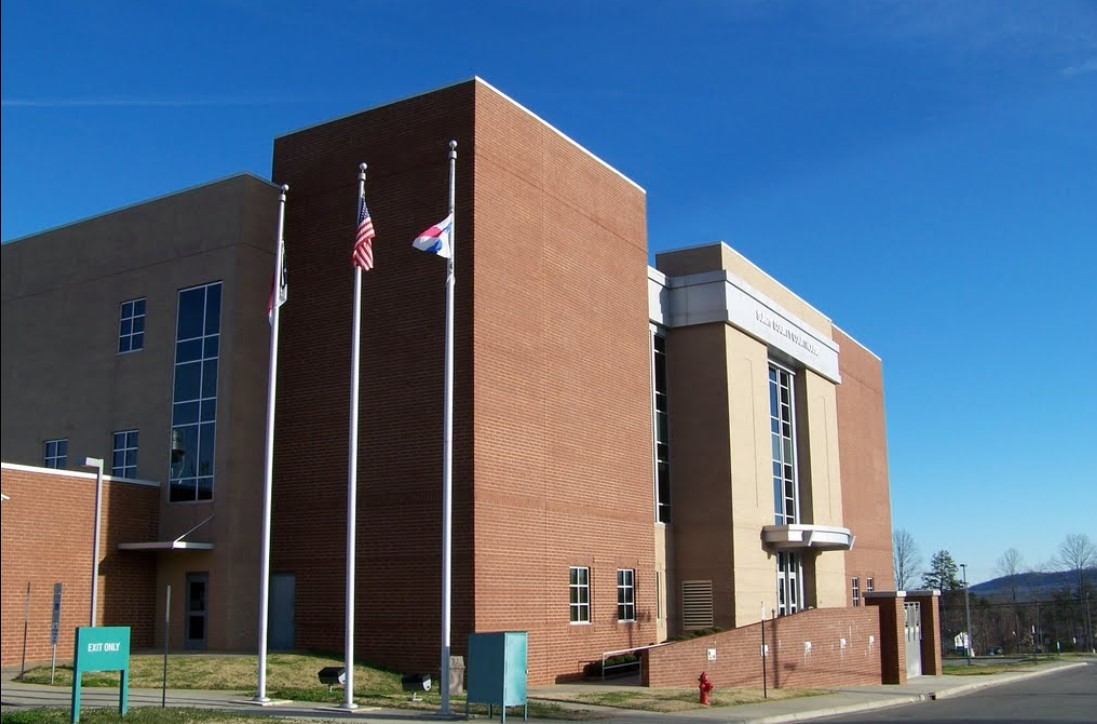
- Surry County Courthouse

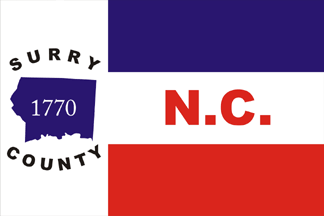
- Flag Seal

- Location within the U.S. state of North Carolina
- Coordinates: 36.42°N 80.69°W
- Country: United States
- State: North Carolina
- Founded: April 1, 1771
- Named for: Surrey, England
- Seat: Dobson
- Largest community: Mount Airy

Area
  - Total: 536.66 sq mi (1,389.9 km^{2})
  - Land: 532.65 sq mi (1,379.6 km^{2})
  - Water: 4.01 sq mi (10.4 km^{2}) 0.75%

Population (2020)
  - Total: 71,359
  - Estimate (2025): 72,287 ▲
  - Density: 133.97/sq mi (51.73/km^{2})
- Time zone: UTC−5 (Eastern)
  - Summer (DST): UTC−4 (EDT)
- Congressional district: 5th
- Website: www.co.surry.nc.us

Surry County is a county located in the U.S. state of North Carolina. As of the 2020 census, the population was 71,359. Its county seat is Dobson, and its largest community is Mount Airy.

Surry county comprises the Mount Airy, NC Micropolitan Statistical Area, which is also included in the Greensboro–Winston-Salem–High Point, NC Combined Statistical Area.

== History ==
1950 map of Surry County

The county was formed in 1771 from Rowan County as part of the British Province of North Carolina. It was named for the county of Surrey in England, birthplace of William Tryon, governor of North Carolina from 1765 to 1771.

In 1777, parts of Surry County and Washington District (now Washington County, Tennessee) were combined to form Wilkes County. The first permanent courthouse was established at Richmond in 1779, what is now the modern-day Old Richmond Township in Forsyth County near Donnaha. However, in 1789 the eastern half of Surry County became Stokes County, thus making the Richmond site unusable for either county. In 1790, the county seat was moved to Rockford, where it remained for over half a century. In 1850, half of the county's remaining territory south of the Yadkin River became Yadkin County. The town of Dobson was established in 1853 to be the new county seat.

== Geography ==
Interactive map of Surry County

According to the U.S. Census Bureau, the county has a total area of 536.66 square miles (1,389.9 km^{2}), of which 532.65 square miles (1,379.6 km^{2}) are land and 4.01 square miles (10.4 km^{2}) (0.75%) are water.

The whole county is generally considered part of the Piedmont Triad metropolitan area. Surry County is located in the Yadkin Valley AVA, an American Viticultural Area. Wines made from grapes grown in Surry County may carry the appellation Yadkin Valley on their label.

=== Mountains ===
Surry County is located both within the Piedmont region of central North Carolina and in the Appalachian Mountains region of western North Carolina. Most of the eastern two-thirds of the county lies within the Piedmont, a region of gently rolling hills and valleys. However, the Piedmont of Surry County also contains a small portion of the Sauratown Mountains; Surry County marks the western end of the Sauratown Mountain range. The western third of the county lies within the Blue Ridge Mountains, and they dominate the county's western horizon. The mountain passes (called "gaps" locally) are notorious for their occasional high winds, which can force automobiles and even large Eighteen wheeler trucks off the highways which lead through the passes. As a result, high wind advisories issued by the National Weather Service are not uncommon. The highest point in Surry County is Fisher Peak in the Blue Ridge; it rises to 3,570 feet (1,088 m) above sea level. However, the best-known peak in Surry County is not the highest. That honor goes to Pilot Mountain, an isolated monadnock and a North Carolina landmark. Pilot Mountain sharply rises some 2,421 feet (738 m) above the surrounding countryside, and can be seen for miles.

=== Major water bodies ===
- Ararat River
- Bear Creek
- Big Creek
- Camp Creek
- Fisher River
- Flat Shoal Creek
- Grassy Creek
- Hogan Creek
- King Creek
- Little Fisher Creek
- Mill Creek
- Mitchell River
- Pauls Creek
- Pheasant Creek
- Pilot Creek
- Ramey Creek
- Stewarts Creek
- Toms Creek
- Yadkin River

While there are many creeks and streams in Surry County, there are three recognized major rivers in the county, the Ararat, the Fisher, and the Mitchell. All three flow southward and are tributaries of the Yadkin River, which forms the southern border of Surry County. The Yadkin River is the northern component of the Pee Dee River which flows to the Atlantic Ocean near Georgetown, South Carolina.

=== National protected areas ===
- Cumberland Knob Recreation Area (part)

=== State and local protected areas/sites ===
- Horne Creek Living Historical Farm
- Mitchell River Game Land (part)
- Pilot Mountain State Park
- Raven Knob Scout Reservation (part)

=== Adjacent counties ===
- Patrick County, Virginia – northeast
- Carroll County, Virginia – north
- Grayson County, Virginia – northwest
- Stokes County – east
- Forsyth County – southeast
- Yadkin County – south
- Wilkes County – southwest
- Alleghany County – west

=== Major highways ===
- I-74 / Future I-74 (route designated from the state border with Virginia to Exit 17)
- I-77
- US 21
- US 21 Bus.
- US 52
- US 52 Bus.
- US 601
- US 601 Bus.
- NC 18
- NC 89
- NC 103
- NC 104
- NC 268
- NC 268 Bus.

=== Major infrastructure ===
- Mount Airy/Surry County Airport
- Elkin Municipal Airport

== Demographics ==
Historical population
Census	Pop.	Note	%±
1790	7,192		—
1800	9,505		32.2%
1810	10,366		9.1%
1820	12,320		18.9%
1830	14,504		17.7%
1840	15,079		4.0%
1850	18,443		22.3%
1860	10,380		−43.7%
1870	11,252		8.4%
1880	15,302		36.0%
1890	19,281		26.0%
1900	25,515		32.3%
1910	29,705		16.4%
1920	32,464		9.3%
1930	39,749		22.4%
1940	41,783		5.1%
1950	45,593		9.1%
1960	48,205		5.7%
1970	51,415		6.7%
1980	59,449		15.6%
1990	61,704		3.8%
2000	71,219		15.4%
2010	73,673		3.4%
2020	71,359		−3.1%
2025 (est.)	72,287	▲	1.3%
U.S. Decennial Census; 1790–1960 1900–1990; 1990–2000 2010 2020

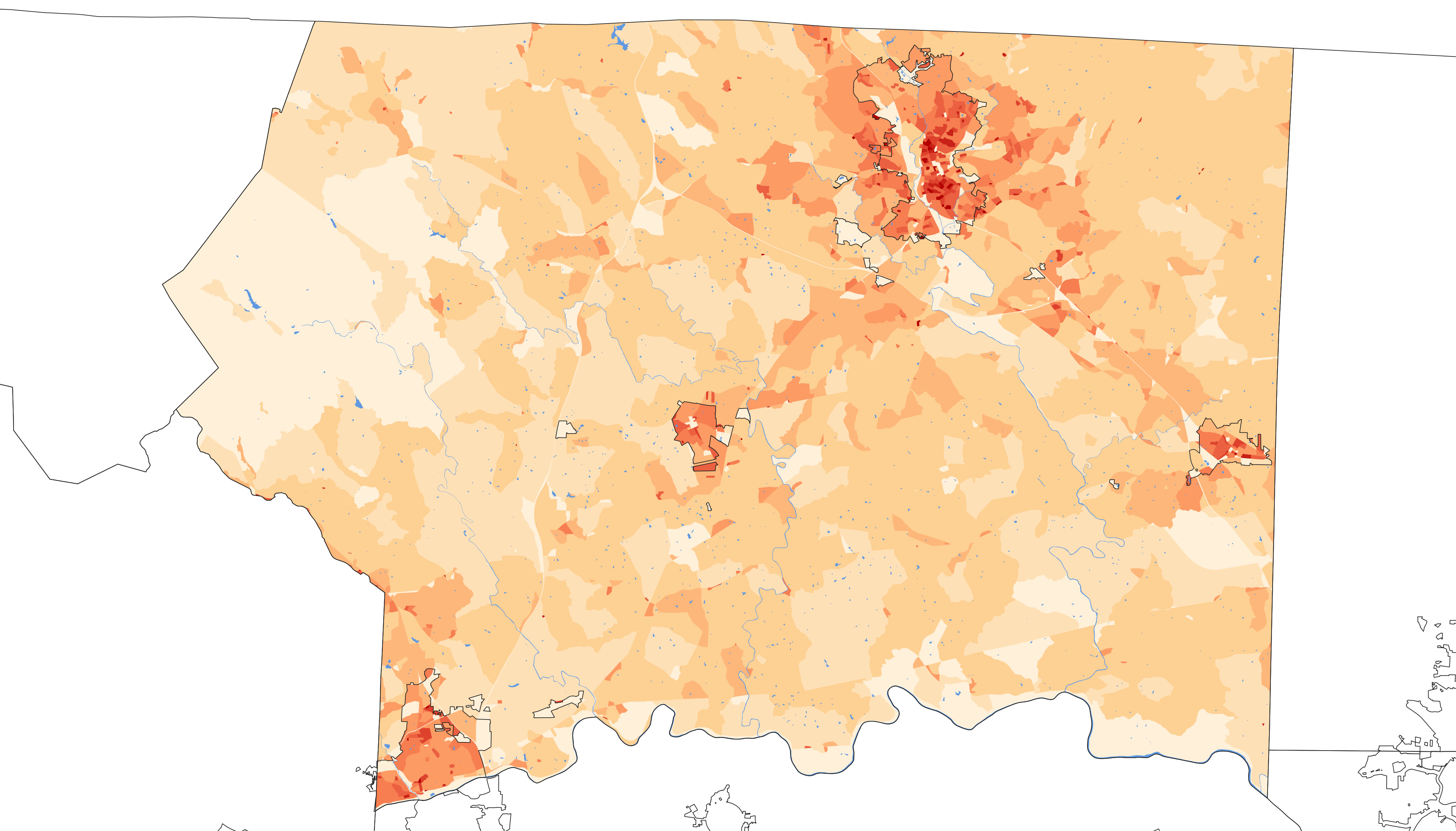
2020 population density of Surry County NC by census block

=== Racial and ethnic composition ===
Surry County, North Carolina – Racial and ethnic composition Note: the US Census treats Hispanic/Latino as an ethnic category. This table excludes Latinos from the racial categories and assigns them to a separate category. Hispanics/Latinos may be of any race.
Race / Ethnicity (NH = Non-Hispanic)	Pop 1980	Pop 1990	Pop 2000	Pop 2010	Pop 2020	% 1980	% 1990	% 2000	% 2010	% 2020
White alone (NH)	55,968	58,160	62,668	62,611	57,771	94.14%	94.26%	87.99%	84.99%	80.96%
Black or African American alone (NH)	2,895	2,765	2,911	2,644	2,413	4.87%	4.48%	4.09%	3.59%	3.38%
Native American or Alaska Native alone (NH)	58	64	147	173	130	0.10%	0.10%	0.21%	0.23%	0.18%
Asian alone (NH)	55	84	399	339	370	0.09%	0.14%	0.56%	0.46%	0.52%
Native Hawaiian or Pacific Islander alone (NH)	x	x	21	9	11	x	x	0.03%	0.01%	0.02%
Other race alone (NH)	33	29	32	58	148	0.06%	0.05%	0.04%	0.08%	0.21%
Mixed race or Multiracial (NH)	x	x	421	684	2,020	x	x	0.59%	0.93%	2.83%
Hispanic or Latino (any race)	440	602	4,620	7,155	8,496	0.74%	0.98%	6.49%	9.71%	11.91%
Total	59,449	61,704	71,219	73,673	71,359	100.00%	100.00%	100.00%	100.00%	100.00%

=== 2020 census ===
As of the 2020 census, there were 71,359 people, 29,659 households, and 19,539 families residing in the county. The median age was 44.7 years. 20.9% of residents were under the age of 18 and 21.6% of residents were 65 years of age or older. For every 100 females there were 94.7 males, and for every 100 females age 18 and over there were 92.5 males age 18 and over.

The racial makeup of the county was 83.1% White, 3.5% Black or African American, 0.4% American Indian and Alaska Native, 0.5% Asian, <0.1% Native Hawaiian and Pacific Islander, 6.7% from some other race, and 5.8% from two or more races. Hispanic or Latino residents of any race comprised 11.9% of the population.

24.3% of residents lived in urban areas, while 75.7% lived in rural areas.

Of those households, 27.5% had children under the age of 18 living in them. Of all households, 48.6% were married-couple households, 18.5% were households with a male householder and no spouse or partner present, and 27.5% were households with a female householder and no spouse or partner present. About 30.1% of all households were made up of individuals and 15.1% had someone living alone who was 65 years of age or older. The 2020 census counted 33,436 housing units, of which 11.3% were vacant. Among occupied housing units, 72.0% were owner-occupied and 28.0% were renter-occupied. The homeowner vacancy rate was 1.4% and the rental vacancy rate was 6.6%.

=== 2000 census ===
At the 2000 census, there were 71,219 people, 28,408 households, and 20,482 families residing in the county. The population density was 133 people per square mile (51 people/km^{2}). There were 31,033 housing units at an average density of 58 units per square mile (22 units/km^{2}). The racial makeup of the county was 90.40% White, 4.16% Black or African American, 0.23% Native American, 0.57% Asian, 0.04% Pacific Islander, 3.45% from other races, and 1.15% from two or more races. 6.49% of the population were Hispanic or Latino of any race.

There were 28,408 households, out of which 30.80% had children under the age of 18 living with them, 58.40% were married couples living together, 9.70% had a female householder with no husband present, and 27.90% were non-families. 25.00% of all households were made up of individuals, and 11.70% had someone living alone who was 65 years of age or older. The average household size was 2.46 and the average family size was 2.92.

In the county, the population was spread out, with 23.60% under the age of 18, 7.90% from 18 to 24, 29.00% from 25 to 44, 24.10% from 45 to 64, and 15.40% who were 65 years of age or older. The median age was 38 years. For every 100 females there were 95.70 males. For every 100 females age 18 and over, there were 92.20 males.

The median income for a household in the county was $33,046, and the median income for a family was $38,902. Males had a median income of $27,854 versus $20,556 for females. The per capita income for the county was $17,722. About 9.10% of families and 12.40% of the population were below the poverty line, including 15.00% of those under age 18 and 17.40% of those age 65 or over.

== Government and politics ==
Surry is at present a strongly Republican county. The last Democratic presidential nominee to carry Surry County has been Jimmy Carter in 1976, and no Democrat since 1996 has reached 40% of the county's vote. Hillary Clinton received only twenty-three percent in 2016, a proportion smaller than Hubert Humphrey obtained in the three-way 1968 race.

In the early 20th century, Surry swung from Democratic-leaning during the Third Party System, to Republican enough to be alongside Yadkin and Stokes County as the only North Carolina counties to vote with William Howard Taft during his disastrous 1912 campaign, back to Democratic enough to support Adlai Stevenson II in 1952.

United States presidential election results for Surry County, North Carolina
Year	Republican		Democratic		Third party(ies)	
Year	No.	%	No.	%	No.	%
1912	2,277	47.39%	1,919	39.94%	609	12.67%
1916	2,977	59.33%	2,029	40.43%	12	0.24%
1920	5,170	59.31%	3,547	40.69%	0	0.00%
1924	4,990	52.67%	4,418	46.63%	66	0.70%
1928	7,015	65.79%	3,647	34.21%	0	0.00%
1932	4,511	37.37%	7,490	62.05%	69	0.57%
1936	4,766	35.05%	8,833	64.95%	0	0.00%
1940	4,178	32.02%	8,871	67.98%	0	0.00%
1944	5,116	39.98%	7,679	60.02%	0	0.00%
1948	4,643	37.89%	6,956	56.77%	654	5.34%
1952	7,591	48.05%	8,206	51.95%	0	0.00%
1956	9,001	56.18%	7,020	43.82%	0	0.00%
1960	10,035	55.08%	8,185	44.92%	0	0.00%
1964	7,970	44.83%	9,810	55.17%	0	0.00%
1968	9,638	51.19%	5,088	27.02%	4,103	21.79%
1972	10,497	67.78%	4,706	30.39%	284	1.83%
1976	7,403	42.33%	10,024	57.31%	63	0.36%
1980	10,065	51.86%	8,987	46.31%	356	1.83%
1984	13,340	64.88%	7,188	34.96%	34	0.17%
1988	11,393	61.06%	7,245	38.83%	22	0.12%
1992	10,866	46.33%	9,392	40.05%	3,195	13.62%
1996	11,117	55.53%	7,303	36.48%	1,601	8.00%
2000	15,401	65.93%	7,757	33.21%	200	0.86%
2004	17,587	67.66%	8,304	31.95%	101	0.39%
2008	18,730	63.44%	10,475	35.48%	320	1.08%
2012	19,923	67.60%	9,112	30.92%	435	1.48%
2016	23,671	73.52%	7,488	23.26%	1,037	3.22%
2020	27,538	75.16%	8,721	23.80%	379	1.03%
2024	28,565	76.16%	8,613	22.96%	330	0.88%

Surry County is a member of the Northwest Piedmont Council of Governments. The five-member Board of County Commissioners are elected from single-member districts for four-year staggered terms, with elections in even-numbered years. The board elects a chair and vice-chair, who serve twelve-month terms.

The board appoints a county manager, who oversees county administration and implements the board's policies.

== Economy ==
In its 2024 county economic tier ratings, the North Carolina Department of Commerce classified Surry as among the state's 40 most economically distressed counties, or "tier 1", largely owing to a prevailing low median household income in the county.

== Education ==
Surry County is divided into three local school systems: Surry County Schools, Mount Airy City Schools, and Elkin City Schools.

=== Surry County Schools ===
==== High schools ====
- Surry Early College High School of Design (on the Surry Community College campus.)
- East Surry High School
- North Surry High School
- Surry Central High School

==== Middle schools ====
- Central Middle School
- Gentry Middle School
- Meadowview Magnet Middle School
- Pilot Mountain Middle School

==== Elementary schools ====
- Cedar Ridge Elementary School
- Copeland Elementary School
- Dobson Elementary School
- Flat Rock Elementary School
- Franklin Elementary School
- Mountain Park Elementary School
- Pilot Mountain Elementary School
- Rockford Elementary School
- Shoals Elementary School
- Westfield Elementary School
- White Plains Elementary School

=== Mount Airy City Schools ===
- Mount Airy High School
- Mount Airy Middle School
- Jones Intermediate School
- Tharington Primary School

=== Elkin City Schools ===
The Elkin City Schools system has 3 schools ranging from pre-kindergarten to twelfth grade: Elkin Elementary School, Elkin Middle School and Elkin High School.

=== Charter School ===
Surry County is also home to one charter school, Millennium Charter Academy. The school is located in Mount Airy and currently offers kindergarten to twelfth grade education.

=== Colleges and universities ===
Surry Community College, part of the North Carolina Community College System, is the county's only institution for post-secondary education.

== Media ==
=== Print ===
Surry County is home to three local newspapers, The Mount Airy News of Mount Airy, The Pilot in Pilot Mountain and The Tribune of Elkin. Additionally, the larger daily Winston-Salem Journal covers news and events in the county. One local newspaper, The Messenger in Mount Airy, ceased operation in approximately 2011.

=== Broadcast ===
WIFM in Elkin is a full-time FM radio station. The county has three AM stations, WYZD in Dobson, as well as WSYD and WPAQ in Mount Airy, both of which operate also on 24-hour FM repeaters that cover most of the county. There are no broadcast television stations in Surry County.

Surry County is part of the Piedmont Triad radio and television market but many broadcasts from the Charlotte market also can be received in Surry County.

== Culture ==
Surry County is apparently home to the fictitious community of Mayberry from "The Andy Griffith Show", which aired from 1960 through 1968. Andy Griffith reportedly used many things from his hometown in his TV town. Now guests can experience what it was like living in Mayberry by visiting the Andy Griffith Museum, stopping by Andy's homeplace, getting a trim at Floyd's barbershop, taking a ride in a replica Mayberry Squad Car, or even grabbing a bite to eat at Snappy Lunch. Every year in September the city holds the "Mayberry Days" celebration, where fans can come and enjoy the town together.

A dish, sonker, is made in Surry County and surrounding areas in North Carolina, and is thought to have originated in the county in the mid-1800s. Similar to cobbler, it is a pie made of dough with a fruit or sweet potato filling and baked. It is traditionally served with "dip", a vanilla cream sauce. Since 1980, Mount Airy has hosted an annual sonker festival, and sonkers are often made to cater to tourism. Ground steak—principally a sandwich consisting of ground beef or chuck, flour, salt, and pepper mixed with water or milk—is exclusive to the county, maintaining enduring popularity among locals since the Great Depression, when it was developed as means of stretching supplies of beef.

== Communities ==
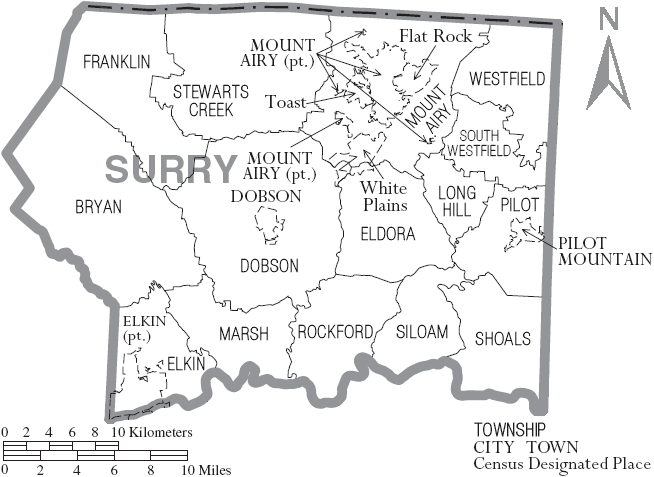
Map of Surry County with municipal and township labels

=== City ===
- Mount Airy (largest community)

=== Towns ===
- Dobson (county seat)
- Elkin (also in Wilkes County)
- Pilot Mountain

=== Census-designated places ===
- Flat Rock
- Lowgap
- Toast
- White Plains

=== Townships ===
- Bryan
- Dobson
- Eldora
- Elkin
- Franklin
- Long Hill
- Marsh
- Mount Airy
- Pilot
- Rockford
- Shoals
- Siloam
- South Westfield
- Stewarts Creek
- Westfield

=== Unincorporated communities ===
- Albion
- Ararat
- Ash Hill
- Bannertown
- Blackwater
- Blevins Store
- Boones Hill
- Bottom
- Burch
- Cedar Hill
- Combstown
- Copeland
- Crooked Oak
- Crutchfield
- Devotion
- Fairview
- Franklin
- Hills Grove
- Holly Springs
- Indian Grove
- Jenkinstown
- Ladonia
- Level Cross
- Little Richmond
- Long Hill
- Mount Herman
- Mountain Park
- Mulberry
- New Hope
- Oak Grove
- Pine Hill
- Pine Ridge
- Poplar Springs
- Red Brush
- Rockford
- Round Peak
- Salem
- Salem Fork
- Sheltontown
- Shoals
- Siloam
- Slate Mountain
- State Road
- Stony Knoll
- Turkey Ford
- Union Cross
- Union Hill
- Westfield
- White Sulphur Springs
- Woodville
- Zephyr

== See also ==
- List of counties in North Carolina
- National Register of Historic Places listings in Surry County, North Carolina
- Yadkin Valley AVA, wine region partially located in the county
