= Ararat River =

Stream in North Carolina, USA

Ararat River Tributary to Yadkin River
- Location of Ararat River mouth

Location
- Country: United States
- State: North Carolina; Virginia
- Counties: Surry (NC); Patrick (Va)

Physical characteristics
- Source: divide between Dan River and Ararat River
  - location: Bell Spur, Virginia
  - coordinates: 36°39′55″N 080°28′44″W
  - elevation: 2,650 ft (810 m)
- Mouth: Yadkin River
  - location: Siloam, North Carolina
  - coordinates: 36°17′09″N 080°32′53″W
  - elevation: 800 ft (240 m)
- Length: 32.44 mi (52.21 km)
- Basin size: 313.37 square miles (811.6 km^{2})
- Discharge
  - location: Yadkin River
  - average: 426.65 cu ft/s (12.081 m^{3}/s) at mouth with Yadkin River

Basin features
- Progression: Yadkin River → Pee Dee River → Winyah Bay → Atlantic Ocean
- River system: Yadkin River
- Tributaries
  - left: Clarks Creek; Champ Creek; Faulkner Creek; Seed Cane Creek; Rutledge Creek; Stoney Creek; Flat Shoal Creek; Toms Creek; Pilot Creek
  - right: Thompson Creek; Sun Run; Kings Run; Grogen Branch; Birds Branch; Doe Run Creek; Owens Branch; Johnson Creek; Lovills Creek; Stewarts Creek; Caddle Creek; Oldfield Creek; Bull Creek; Skin Cabin Creek

The Ararat River is a tributary of the Yadkin River in southwestern Virginia and northwestern North Carolina in the United States. Via the Yadkin it is part of the watershed of the Pee Dee River, which flows to the Atlantic Ocean.

The Ararat River rises in the Blue Ridge Mountains in southwestern Patrick County, Virginia, and flows southwardly into Surry County, North Carolina, where it flows through the city of Mount Airy and joins the Yadkin River, about 5 mi (8 km) northwest of East Bend. The river is stocked with brown, brook, and rainbow trout.

== Variant names ==
According to the Geographic Names Information System, it has also been known historically as:

- Arrat River
- Ararat Creek
- Rentfro Creek
- Rentfrows Creek
- Tarrarat River

== See also ==
- List of North Carolina rivers
- List of Virginia rivers
