= Halls Branch (Lovills Creek tributary) =

Stream in Virginia, USA

Halls Branch Tributary to Lovills Creek
- Location of Halls Branch mouth Halls Branch (Lovills Creek tributary) (the United States)

Location
- Country: United States
- State: Virginia
- County: Carroll

Physical characteristics
- Source: Pauls Creek divide
  - location: about 4 miles north-northwest of Cana, Virginia
  - coordinates: 36°35′58″N 080°40′53″W
  - elevation: 2,190 ft (670 m)
- Mouth
  - location: about 1 mile southeast of Cana, Virginia
  - coordinates: 36°35′00″N 080°38′41″W
  - elevation: 1,194 ft (364 m)
- Length: 5.01 mi (8.06 km)
- Basin size: 5.11 square miles (13.2 km^{2})
- Discharge
  - location: Lovills Creek
  - average: 8.70 cu ft/s (0.246 m^{3}/s) at mouth with Lovills Creek

Basin features
- Progression: Lovills Creek → Ararat River → Yadkin River → Pee Dee River → Winyah Bay → Atlantic Ocean
- River system: Yadkin River
- Tributaries
  - left: unnamed tributaries
  - right: unnamed tributaries
- Waterbodies: unnamed reservoir
- Bridges: Little Bear Trail, Bear Trail, Parkview Drive, Meadowbrook Road

Halls Branch is a 5.01 mi (8.06 km) long 2nd order tributary to Lovills Creek in Carroll County, Virginia.

== Course ==
Halls Branch rises about 4 miles north-northwest of Cana, Virginia in Carroll County and then flows southeast to join Lovills Creek about 1 mile south of Cana.

== Watershed ==
Halls Branch drains 5.11 square miles (13.2 km^{2}) of area, receives about 49.9 in/year of precipitation, has a wetness index of 314.13, and is about 53% forested.

== See also ==
- List of Virginia Rivers
