= Brushy Fork (Pauls Creek tributary) =

Stream in North Carolina, USA

Brushy Fork Tributary to Pauls Creek
- Location of Brushy Fork mouth Brushy Fork (Pauls Creek tributary) (the United States)

Location
- Country: United States
- State: North Carolina; Virginia
- County: Surry; Carroll County
- City: Cana

Physical characteristics
- Source: Halls Branch divide
  - location: Cana, Virginia
  - coordinates: 36°35′23″N 080°40′37″W
  - elevation: 1,400 ft (430 m)
- Mouth
  - location: about 2 miles northwest of Toast, North Carolina
  - coordinates: 36°32′08″N 080°39′35″W
  - elevation: 1,118 ft (341 m)
- Length: 4.37 mi (7.03 km)
- Basin size: 4.90 square miles (12.7 km^{2})
- Discharge
  - location: Pauls Creek
  - average: 7.58 cu ft/s (0.215 m^{3}/s) at mouth with Pauls Creek

Basin features
- Progression: Pauls Creek → Stewarts Creek → Ararat River → Yadkin River → Pee Dee River → Winyah Bay → Atlantic Ocean
- River system: Yadkin River
- Tributaries
  - left: unnamed tributaries
  - right: unnamed tributaries
- Bridges: Woodcreek Drive, Virgilina Circle, White Pines Country Club Road, Silver Tab Trail

Brushy Fork is a 4.37 mi (7.03 km) long 2nd order tributary to Pauls Creek in Surry County, North Carolina.

== Course ==
Brushy Fork rises at Cana, Virginia, in Carroll County and then flows generally south into Surry County, North Carolina to join Pauls Creek about 1.5 milea northwest of Toast, North Carolina.

== Watershed ==
Brushy Fork drains 4.90 square miles (12.7 km^{2}) of area, receives about 48.3 in/year of precipitation, has a wetness index of 339.13, and is about 52% forested.

== See also ==
- List of Rivers of North Carolina
- List of Rivers of Virginia
