= Rocky Creek (Lovills Creek tributary) =

Stream in North Carolina, USA

Rocky Creek Tributary to Lovills Creek
- Location of Rocky Creek mouth Rocky Creek (Lovills Creek tributary) (the United States)

Location
- Country: United States
- State: North Carolina
- County: Surry
- City: Mount Airy

Physical characteristics
- Source: Pauls Creek divide
  - location: about 1 mile north of Toast, North Carolina
  - coordinates: 36°32′02″N 080°38′36″W
  - elevation: 1,200 ft (370 m)
- Mouth
  - location: Mount Airy, North Carolina
  - coordinates: 36°30′38″N 080°37′17″W
  - elevation: 1,024 ft (312 m)
- Length: 2.22 mi (3.57 km)
- Basin size: 1.74 square miles (4.5 km^{2})
- Discharge
  - location: Lovills Creek
  - average: 2.64 cu ft/s (0.075 m^{3}/s) at mouth with Lovills Creek

Basin features
- Progression: Lovills Creek → Ararat River → Yadkin River → Pee Dee River → Winyah Bay → Atlantic Ocean
- River system: Yadkin River
- Tributaries
  - left: unnamed tributaries
  - right: unnamed tributaries
- Waterbodies: City Lake
- Bridges: Boggs Drive, Westlake Drive, US 52, Hickory Street

Rocky Creek is a 2.22 mi (3.57 km) long 1st order tributary to Lovills Creek in Surry County, North Carolina.

== Variant names ==
According to the Geographic Names Information System, it has also been known historically as:

- Osborns Creek

== Course ==
Rocky Creek rises about 1 mile north of Toast, North Carolina in Surry County and then flows southeast to join Lovills Creek at Mount Airy.

== Watershed ==
Rocky Creek drains 1.74 square miles (4.5 km^{2}) of area, receives about 47.4 in/year of precipitation, has a wetness index of 364.58, and is about 30% forested.

== See also ==
- List of North Carolina Rivers
