= Little Pauls Creek =

Stream in Virginia, USA

Little Pauls Creek Tributary to Pauls Creek
- Location of Little Pauls Creek mouth Little Pauls Creek (the United States)

Location
- Country: United States
- State: Virginia
- County: Carroll County

Physical characteristics
- Source: East Fork Crooked Creek divide
  - location: about 1 mile south of Skyland Lakes, Virginia
  - coordinates: 36°37′50″N 080°44′18″W
  - elevation: 2,660 ft (810 m)
- Mouth
  - location: about 1.5 miles southwest of Cana, Virginia
  - coordinates: 36°34′26″N 080°42′11″W
  - elevation: 1,234 ft (376 m)
- Length: 5.28 mi (8.50 km)
- Basin size: 6.19 square miles (16.0 km^{2})
- Discharge
  - location: Pauls Creek
  - average: 11.64 cu ft/s (0.330 m^{3}/s) at mouth with Pauls Creek

Basin features
- Progression: Pauls Creek → Stewarts Creek → Ararat River → Yadkin River → Pee Dee River → Winyah Bay → Atlantic Ocean
- River system: Yadkin River
- Tributaries
  - right: Spring Branch
- Bridges: I-77, Lakeview Drive, Hurlrock Lane, Flower Gap Road

Little Pauls Creek is a 5.28 mi (8.50 km) long 2nd order tributary to Pauls Creek in Carroll County, Virginia.

== Course ==
Little Pauls Creek rises about 1 mile south of Skyland Lakes, Virginia, in Carroll County and then flows southeast to join Pauls Creek about 1.5 miles southwest of Cana, Virginia.

== Watershed ==
Little Pauls Creek drains 6.19 square miles (16.0 km^{2}) of area, receives about 51.4 in/year of precipitation, has a wetness index of 303.56, and is about 73% forested.

== See also ==
- List of Rivers of Virginia
