= Garners Creek (Pauls Creek tributary) =

Stream in Virginia, USA

Garners Creek Tributary to Pauls Creek
- Location of Garners Creek mouth Garners Creek (Pauls Creek tributary) (the United States)

Location
- Country: United States
- State: Virginia
- County: Carroll County

Physical characteristics
- Source: East Fork Crooked Creek divide
  - location: about 1 mile northeast of Sugarloaf Overlook
  - coordinates: 36°38′45″N 080°42′00″W
  - elevation: 2,930 ft (890 m)
- Mouth
  - location: about 1.5 miles northwest of Cana, Virginia
  - coordinates: 36°36′22″N 080°41′58″W
  - elevation: 1,358 ft (414 m)
- Length: 4.00 mi (6.44 km)
- Basin size: 3.85 square miles (10.0 km^{2})
- Discharge
  - location: Pauls Creek
  - average: 8.07 cu ft/s (0.229 m^{3}/s) at mouth with Pauls Creek

Basin features
- Progression: Pauls Creek → Stewarts Creek → Ararat River → Yadkin River → Pee Dee River → Winyah Bay → Atlantic Ocean
- River system: Yadkin River
- Tributaries
  - left: unnamed tributaries
  - right: unnamed tributaries
- Bridges: I-77, Pauls Creek Road

Garners Creek is a 4.00 mi (6.44 km) long 3rd order tributary to Pauls Creek in Carroll County, Virginia.

== Course ==
Garners Creek rises about 1 mile northeast of Sugarloaf Overlook in Carroll County and then flows southeast to join Pauls Creek about 1.5 miles northwest of Cana, Virginia.

== Watershed ==
Garners Creek drains 3.85 square miles (10.0 km^{2}) of area, receives about 53.3 in/year of precipitation, has a wetness index of 282.84, and is about 66% forested.

== See also ==
- List of Rivers of Virginia
