= Elk Spur Branch =

Stream in Virginia, USA

Elk Spur Branch Tributary to Lovills Creek
- Location of Elk Spur Branch mouth Elk Spur Branch (the United States)

Location
- Country: United States
- State: Virginia
- County: Carroll

Physical characteristics
- Source: Pauls Creek divide
  - location: about 4 miles south of Wards Gap
  - coordinates: 36°40′06″N 080°40′28″W
  - elevation: 2,820 ft (860 m)
- Mouth
  - location: about 0.5 miles southeast of Fancy Gap, Virginia
  - coordinates: 36°38′19″N 080°38′06″W
  - elevation: 1,360 ft (410 m)
- Length: 4.06 mi (6.53 km)
- Basin size: 4.40 square miles (11.4 km^{2})
- Discharge
  - location: Lovills Creek
  - average: 9.75 cu ft/s (0.276 m^{3}/s) at mouth with Lovills Creek

Basin features
- Progression: Lovills Creek → Ararat River → Yadkin River → Pee Dee River → Winyah Bay → Atlantic Ocean
- River system: Yadkin River
- Tributaries
  - left: unnamed tributaries
  - right: unnamed tributaries
- Bridges: Hidden Wood Trail, Timber Road

Elk Spur Branch is a 4.06 mi (6.53 km) long 2nd order tributary to Lovills Creek in Carroll County, Virginia, United States.

== Course ==
Elk Spur Branch rises about 0.5 miles southeast of Fancy Gap, Virginia in Carroll County and then flows south and east-southeast to join Lovills Creek about 4 miles south of Wards Gap.

== Watershed ==
Elk Spur Branch drains 4.40 square miles (11.4 km^{2}) of area, receives about 54.2 in/year of precipitation, has a wetness index of 265.16, and is about 81% forested.

== See also ==
- List of Virginia Rivers
