= Waterfall Branch (Lovills Creek tributary) =

Stream in Virginia, USA

Waterfall Branch Tributary to Lovills Creek
- Location of Waterfall Branch mouth Waterfall Branch (Lovills Creek tributary) (the United States)

Location
- Country: United States
- State: Virginia
- County: Carroll

Physical characteristics
- Source: Pauls Creek divide
  - location: Wards Gap
  - coordinates: 36°40′00″N 080°38′46″W
  - elevation: 2,700 ft (820 m)
- Mouth
  - location: about 2 miles south-southeast of Wards Gap
  - coordinates: 36°39′09″N 080°37′42″W
  - elevation: 1,525 ft (465 m)
- Length: 1.43 mi (2.30 km)
- Basin size: 0.62 square miles (1.6 km^{2})
- Discharge
  - location: Lovills Creek
  - average: 1.50 cu ft/s (0.042 m^{3}/s) at mouth with Lovills Creek

Basin features
- Progression: Lovills Creek → Ararat River → Yadkin River → Pee Dee River → Winyah Bay → Atlantic Ocean
- River system: Yadkin River
- Tributaries
  - left: unnamed tributaries
  - right: unnamed tributaries
- Bridges: Winston View Lane, Wards Gap Road

Waterfall Branch is a 1.43 mi (2.30 km) long 1st order tributary to Lovills Creek in Carroll County, Virginia.

== Course ==
Waterfall Branch rises at Wards Gap in Carroll County and then flows southeast to join Lovills Creek about 2 miles south-southeast of Wards Gap.

== Watershed ==
Waterfall Branch drains 0.62 square miles (1.6 km^{2}) of area, receives about 54.8 in/year of precipitation, has a wetness index of 273.71, and is about 67% forested.

== See also ==
- List of Virginia Rivers
