= School House Creek (Lovills Creek tributary) =

Stream in North Carolina, USA

School House Creek Tributary to Lovills Creek
- Location of School House Creek mouth School House Creek (Lovills Creek tributary) (the United States)

Location
- Country: United States
- State: North Carolina
- County: Surry

Physical characteristics
- Source: unnamed tributary to Johnson Creek divide
  - location: about 1 mile north of Mount Airy, North Carolina
  - coordinates: 36°33′20″N 080°36′49″W
  - elevation: 1,290 ft (390 m)
- Mouth
  - location: about 0.5 miles west of Salem, North Carolina
  - coordinates: 36°32′19″N 080°37′17″W
  - elevation: 1,063 ft (324 m)
- Length: 1.56 mi (2.51 km)
- Basin size: 1.10 square miles (2.8 km^{2})
- Discharge
  - location: Lovills Creek
  - average: 1.73 cu ft/s (0.049 m^{3}/s) at mouth with Lovills Creek

Basin features
- Progression: Lovills Creek → Ararat River → Yadkin River → Pee Dee River → Winyah Bay → Atlantic Ocean
- River system: Yadkin River
- Tributaries
  - left: unnamed tributaries
  - right: unnamed tributaries
- Bridges: Cross Creek Drive, Greenhill Road

School House Creek is a 1.56 mi (2.51 km) long 1st order tributary to Lovills Creek in Surry County, North Carolina.

== Course ==
School House Creek rises about 1 mile north of Mount Airy, North Carolina in Surry County and then flows south and then southwest to join Lovills Creek about 0.5 miles west of Salem.

== Watershed ==
School House Creek drains 1.10 square miles (2.8 km^{2}) of area, receives about 47.7 in/year of precipitation, has a wetness index of 329.52, and is about 53% forested.

== See also ==
- List of North Carolina Rivers
