= Lovills Creek =

Stream in North Carolina, USA

Lovills Creek Tributary to Ararat River
- Location of Lovills Creek mouth Lovills Creek (the United States)

Location
- Country: United States
- State: North Carolina; Virginia
- County: Surry; Carroll
- Cities: Mount Airy

Physical characteristics
- Source: Pine Creek divide
  - location: about 0.5 miles east of Wards Gap
  - coordinates: 36°40′18″N 080°37′06″W
  - elevation: 2,615 ft (797 m)
- Mouth: Ararat River
  - location: Mount Airy, North Carolina
  - coordinates: 36°28′33″N 080°37′06″W
  - elevation: 975 ft (297 m)
- Length: 17.24 mi (27.75 km)
- Basin size: 35.97 square miles (93.2 km^{2})
- Discharge
  - location: Ararat River
  - average: 57.00 cu ft/s (1.614 m^{3}/s) at mouth with Ararat River

Basin features
- Progression: Ararat River → Yadkin River → Pee Dee River → Winyah Bay → Atlantic Ocean
- River system: Yadkin River
- Tributaries
  - left: School House Creek
  - right: Waterfall Branch; Elk Spur Branch; Halls Branch; Rocky Creek
- Waterbodies: Lovill's Creek Lake
- Bridges: Cherry Crest Drive, Wards Gap Road, Crotts Hollow Road, Epworth Road, Fish Lake Road, Greenhill Road, US 52, W Independence Boulevard, NC 89, Worth Street, Rockford Street, US 52, Carter Street

Lovills Creek is a 17.24 mi (27.75 km) long 3rd order tributary to the Ararat River in Surry County, North Carolina, United States. This is the only stream of this name in the United States.

== Variant names ==
According to the Geographic Names Information System, it has also been known historically as:

- Lovel Creek
- Lovels Creek
- Lovets Creek
- Loving Creek

== Course ==
Lovills Creek rises about 0.5 miles east of Wards Gap on the Pine Creek divide in Carroll County, Virginia. Lovills Creek than flows south into Surry County, North Carolina to join the Ararat River at Mount Airy.

== Watershed ==
Lovills Creek drains 35.97 square miles (93.2 km^{2}) of area, receives about 49.9 in/year of precipitation, has a wetness index of 318.89, and is about 57% forested.

== See also ==
- List of rivers of North Carolina
