= Lovill's Creek Lake =

Lake in Carroll County, Virginia, United States

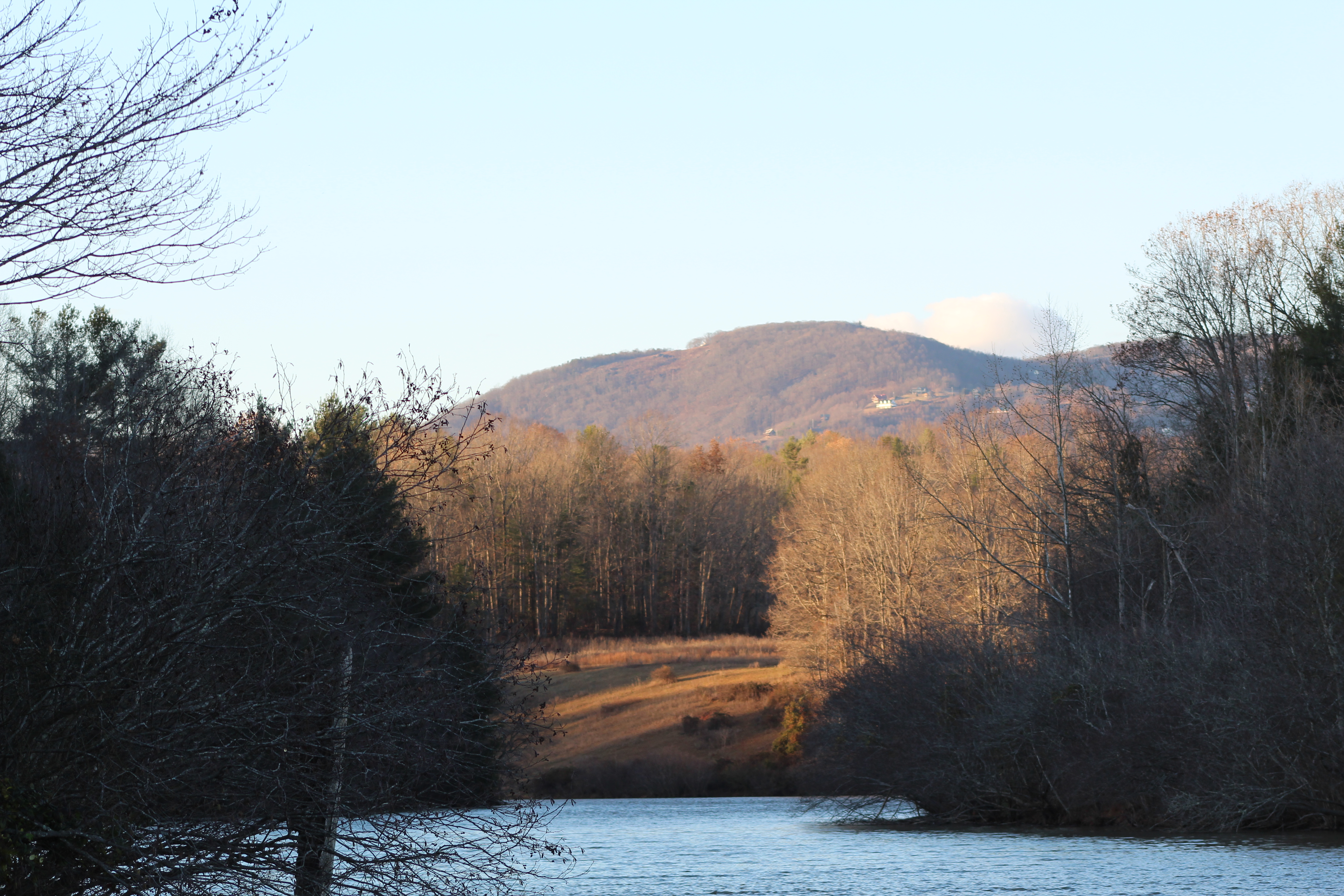
- A simple picture of the hills and the lake at noon.

- Location within Virginia
- Location: Carroll County, Virginia
- Coordinates: 36.5837°N 80.6456°W
- Primary inflows: Lovills Creek, Halls Branch
- Primary outflows: Lovills Creek
- Max. length: 0.72 miles (1.16 km)
- Max. width: 0.3 miles (0.48 km)
- Islands: 1
- Settlements: Cana

Lovill's Creek Lake is a man-made lake located in Carroll County, Virginia.

It was created in 1990 by the United States Department of Agriculture Natural Resources Conservation Service.

As of 2019 the area has become the home of two Bald Eagles who have taken up residence at the lake. Documented through eBird by local birding enthusiasts brother sister duo Dakota and Cassandra
