= Cana, Virginia =

- CDP
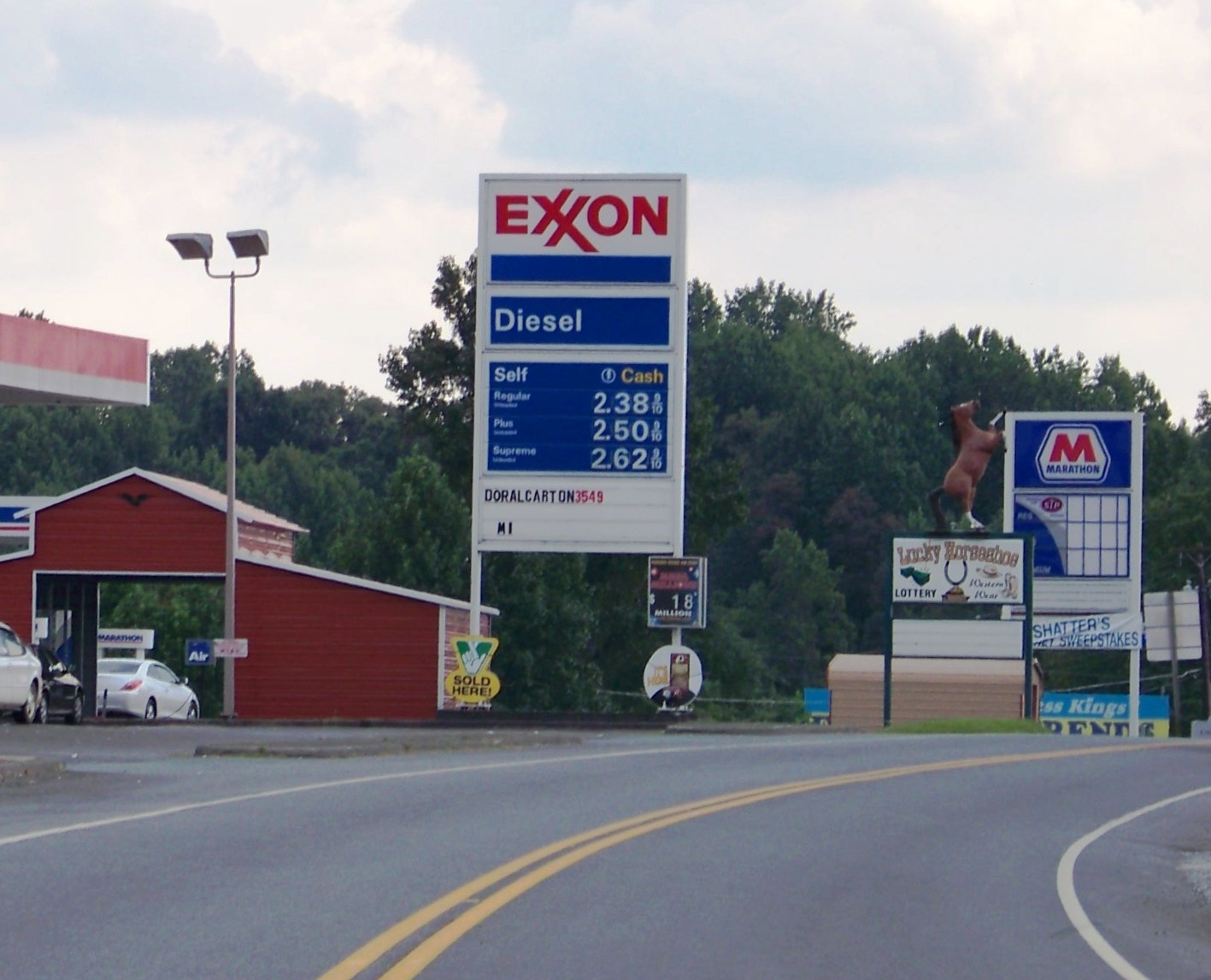
- Roadside scene in Cana, near the North Carolina state line

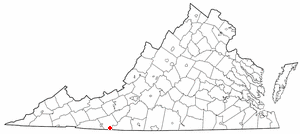
- Location of Cana, Virginia
- Coordinates: 36°35′3″N 80°40′13″W
- Country: United States
- State: Virginia
- County: Carroll

Area
  - Total: 7.9 sq mi (20.5 km^{2})
  - Land: 7.9 sq mi (20.5 km^{2})
  - Water: 0 sq mi (0.0 km^{2})
- Elevation: 1,440 ft (439 m)

Population (2010)
  - Total: 1,254
  - Density: 158/sq mi (61.2/km^{2})
- Time zone: UTC−5 (Eastern (EST))
  - Summer (DST): UTC−4 (EDT)
- ZIP code: 24317
- Area code: 276
- FIPS code: 51-12600
- GNIS feature ID: 1492702

Cana (/ˈkeɪnə/) is a census-designated place (CDP) in Carroll County, Virginia, United States. As of the 2020 census, Cana had a population of 1,243. It is the only CDP designated area in the county that is outside of the Appalachian Mountains in the Virginia Piedmont .

== Geography ==
Cana is located at 36°35′3″N 80°40′13″W (36.584150, −80.670186). US Highway 52 runs through Cana just above the North Carolina state line.

According to the United States Census Bureau, the CDP has a total area of 7.9 square miles (20.5 km^{2}), all land.

== Demographics ==
Historical population
Census	Pop.	Note	%±
2000	1,228		—
2020	1,243		—
U.S. Decennial Census; 2000 2010 2020

Cana was first listed as a census designated place in the 2000 U.S. census.

As of the census of 2000, there were 1,228 people, 520 households, and 362 families residing in the CDP. The population density was 155.0 people per square mile (59.9/km^{2}). There were 576 housing units at an average density of 72.7/sq mi (28.1/km^{2}). The racial makeup of the CDP was 97.23% White, 0.08% African American, 0.08% Native American, 1.55% from other races, and 1.06% from two or more races. Hispanic or Latino of any race were 2.69% of the population.

There were 520 households, out of which 28.1% had children under the age of 18 living with them, 57.9% were married couples living together, 9.0% had a female householder with no husband present, and 30.2% were non-families. 29.0% of all households were made up of individuals, and 11.0% had someone living alone who was 65 years of age or older. The average household size was 2.36 and the average family size was 2.90.

In the CDP, the population was spread out, with 22.4% under the age of 18, 7.7% from 18 to 24, 29.4% from 25 to 44, 26.9% from 45 to 64, and 13.6% who were 65 years of age or older. The median age was 38 years. For every 100 females, there were 93.1 males. For every 100 females aged 18 and over, there were 93.7 males.

The median income for a household in the CDP was $27,625, and the median income for a family was $38,625. Males had a median income of $25,600 versus $21,538 for females. The per capita income for the CDP was $14,859. About 6.6% of families and 12.1% of the population were below the poverty line, including 9.5% of those under age 18 and 22.2% of those age 65 or over.

== Notable person ==
- Tim Brown, longtime NASCAR driver
