= Pauls Creek (Stewarts Creek tributary) =

Stream in North Carolina, USA

Pauls Creek Tributary to Stewarts Creek
- Location of Pauls Creek mouth Pauls Creek (Stewarts Creek tributary) (the United States)

Location
- Country: United States
- State: North Carolina; Virginia
- County: Surry; Carroll County
- City: Fancy Gap

Physical characteristics
- Source: unnamed tributary to Reed Island Creek divide
  - location: Fancy Gap, Virginia
  - coordinates: 36°39′14″N 080°40′04″W
  - elevation: 2,800 ft (850 m)
- Mouth
  - location: about 1 mile west of Toast, North Carolina
  - coordinates: 36°30′14″N 080°40′04″W
  - elevation: 1,040 ft (320 m)
- Length: 15.03 mi (24.19 km)
- Basin size: 28.62 square miles (74.1 km^{2})
- Discharge
  - location: Stewarts Creek
  - average: 47.48 cu ft/s (1.344 m^{3}/s) at mouth with Stewarts Creek

Basin features
- Progression: Stewarts Creek → Ararat River → Yadkin River → Pee Dee River → Winyah Bay → Atlantic Ocean
- River system: Yadkin River
- Tributaries
  - left: Yankee Branch; Brushy Fork
  - right: Garners Creek; Little Pauls Creek
- Bridges: US 52, Rocky Ford Road (x2), Pauls Creek Road, Flower Gap Road, Peakview Road, Apple Ridge Road, Reinhardt Lane, Brushy Fork Road, Miller Road, Pipers Gap Road, Sparger Road

Pauls Creek is a 15.03 mi (24.19 km) long 3rd order tributary to Stewarts Creek in Surry County, North Carolina.

== Variant names ==
According to the Geographic Names Information System, it has also been known historically as:

- Garners Creek
- Little Pauls Creek

== Course ==
Pauls Creek rises at Fancy Gap, Virginia, in Carroll County and then flows south-southeast into Surry County, North Carolina to join Stewarts Creek about 1 mile west of Toast, North Carolina.

== Watershed ==
Pauls Creek drains 28.62 square miles (74.1 km^{2}) of area, receives about 50.4 in/year of precipitation, has a wetness index of 318.13, and is about 65% forested.

== See also ==
- List of Rivers of North Carolina
- List of Rivers of Virginia
