= Haw River =

River in North Carolina, United States

Haw River Tributary to Cape Fear River
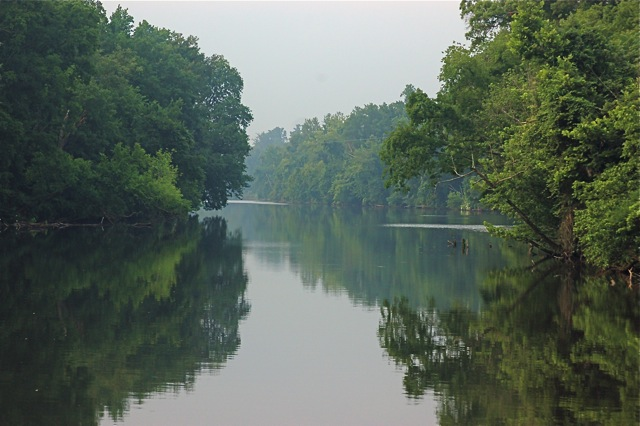
- Convergence of the Haw River and Great Alamance Creek in Swepsonville, North Carolina

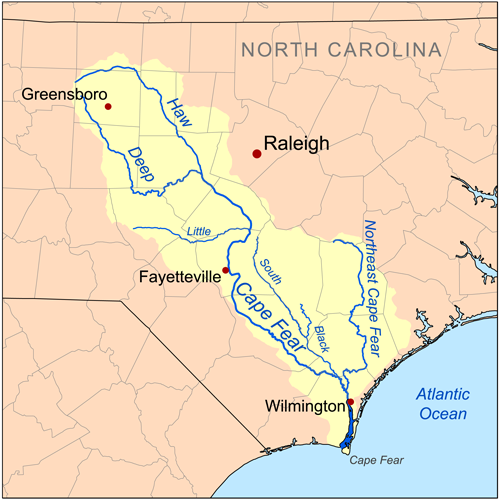
- Map of the Cape Fear drainage basin showing Haw River
- Etymology: Eastern Sioux for piedmont or foothill
- Native name: sak'yápha: (Catawba)

Location
- Country: United States
- State: North Carolina
- Region: Forsyth County, North Carolina, Guilford County, North Carolina, Alamance County, North Carolina, Chatham County, North Carolina, Orange County, North Carolina
- Cities: Haw River, North Carolina, Swepsonville, North Carolina

Physical characteristics
- Source
  - location: Near Kernersville, Forsyth County, North Carolina, United States
  - coordinates: 36°9′46″N 80°1′59.09″W
  - elevation: 1,007 ft (307 m)
- Mouth: Cape Fear River
  - location: Chatham County, North Carolina, United States
  - coordinates: 35°35′46.2″N 79°3′9.1″W
  - elevation: 154 ft (47 m)
- Length: 110 mi (180 km)
- Basin size: 1,707 sq mi (4,420 km^{2})
- Discharge
  - location: Cape Fear River
  - average: 1,727.41 cu ft/s (48.915 m^{3}/s) at mouth with Cape Fear River River

Basin features
- Tributaries
  - left: Rock Branch, Troublesome Creek, Little Troublesome Creek, Giles Creek, Stony Creek, Boyds Creek, Back Creek, Haw Creek, Meadow Creek, Motes Creek, Cane Creek, Collins Creek, Terrells Creek, Wilkinson Creek, Pokeberry Creek, New Hope River, Shaddox Creek
  - right: Mears Fork, Benaja Creek, Candy Creek, Rose Creek (NC), Reedy Fork, Travis Creek, Service Creek, Great Alamance Creek, Varnals Creek, Marys Creek, Cane Creek (NC), Big Branch, Terrell Creek (NC), Dry Creek, Brooks Creek, Haven Creek, Roberson Creek, Stinking Creek

The Haw River is a tributary of the Cape Fear River, approximately 110 mi (177 km) long, which is entirely contained in north central North Carolina in the United States. It was first documented as the "Hau River" by John Lawson, an English botanist, in his 1709 book "A New Voyage to Carolina." The name is shortened from Saxapahaw, from the Catawban /sak'yápha:/, "piedmont, foothill", from /sak/, "hill", plus /yápha:/, "step". The river gives its name to a small town which formed on its banks.

== Course ==
The Haw rises in the Piedmont country in northeast Forsyth County, near the border with Guilford County just north of Kernersville. The river flows northeast, passing north of Oak Ridge and Summerfield into southern Rockingham County, passing through Haw River State Park, which is north of Greensboro. The river begins to flow southeast as it moves through the corner of Guilford County into Alamance County.

In Alamance County, the Haw flows through Ossipee and passes north of Burlington, and through the unincorporated community of Carolina. It goes through the town of Haw River. It flows south and is joined by Great Alamance Creek at Swepsonville and continues on to Saxapahaw. The river forms the southeast border of Alamance County, a border shared by Orange County and Chatham County.

The course of the Haw River continues southeast in Chatham County as it flows just north of Pittsboro. Approximately 12 miles (19 km) southeast of the tip of Alamance County, the Haw flows into the Jordan Lake reservoir, which is formed by the confluence of the Haw River and New Hope Creek. South of the Jordan Lake dam 4 miles (6.4 km) south, the Haw River joins the Deep River to form the Cape Fear River.

== Natural history ==
The Haw River is home to local wildlife including blue heron, beaver, deer, otter, bluegill bream. The Sissipahaw also lived in villages around the banks of the Haw River and its creeks, providing berries and nuts, as well as corn, squash, and beans; the “Three Sisters” crops. Further, the Sissapahaw provided wild game, fish, mussels and crayfish.

== History ==
The river played a major role in the life of Native Americans in the area, including the Sissipahau Indians and in the development of the communities which were built on the river. The river was first dammed in Saxapahaw in the 1850s and used for textile mills through the 19th and 20th centuries, and was a major factor in helping Alamance County to rebuild its local economy following the devastation of the American Civil War. Alamance Plaids, a popular textile during the 1800s, were developed near the present-day community of Glencoe.

During the 20th century, the river became heavily polluted by chemicals used in the production of textiles. The decline of industry in the United States in the late 20th century has reduced pollution in the Haw River. However, since 2013 the Haw and the broader Cape Fear River watershed have been identified as a site of PFAS contamination. Further, groundwater seepage continues to carry PFAS into the river even after the chemical manufacturing plant reduced direct discharges in 2017. Researches expect the chemicals to persist in the watershed for decades. The Haw is still in danger of pollution from suburban nutrient runoff and sediment, which has contributed to recurring algal blooms and the detection of cyanotoxins downstream in Jordan Lake.

Efforts are underway to improve the ecology of the Haw River, but there is disagreement between various environmental groups, local governments, and economic interests as to how to proceed. Recently, the newly revised Jordan Lake Rules have improved regulatory issues which affect future pollution. Most sections of the Haw are clean by reports from the state Water Quality Section, securing it as a recreational and water supply asset.

Since the installation of the new, combined Durham Wastewater Treatment Plant (WWTP), Jordan Lake water tests clean as a water source, save one portion, the upper pool of the New Hope Creek. Occasionally, in the shallow, small upper pool, water from the WWTP raises nutrient levels above allowed limits. When normal flow is returned, they are safely diluted. Lower pools are not affected. Local and state governments cooperate and are often proactive in pollution prevention.

== Economy ==
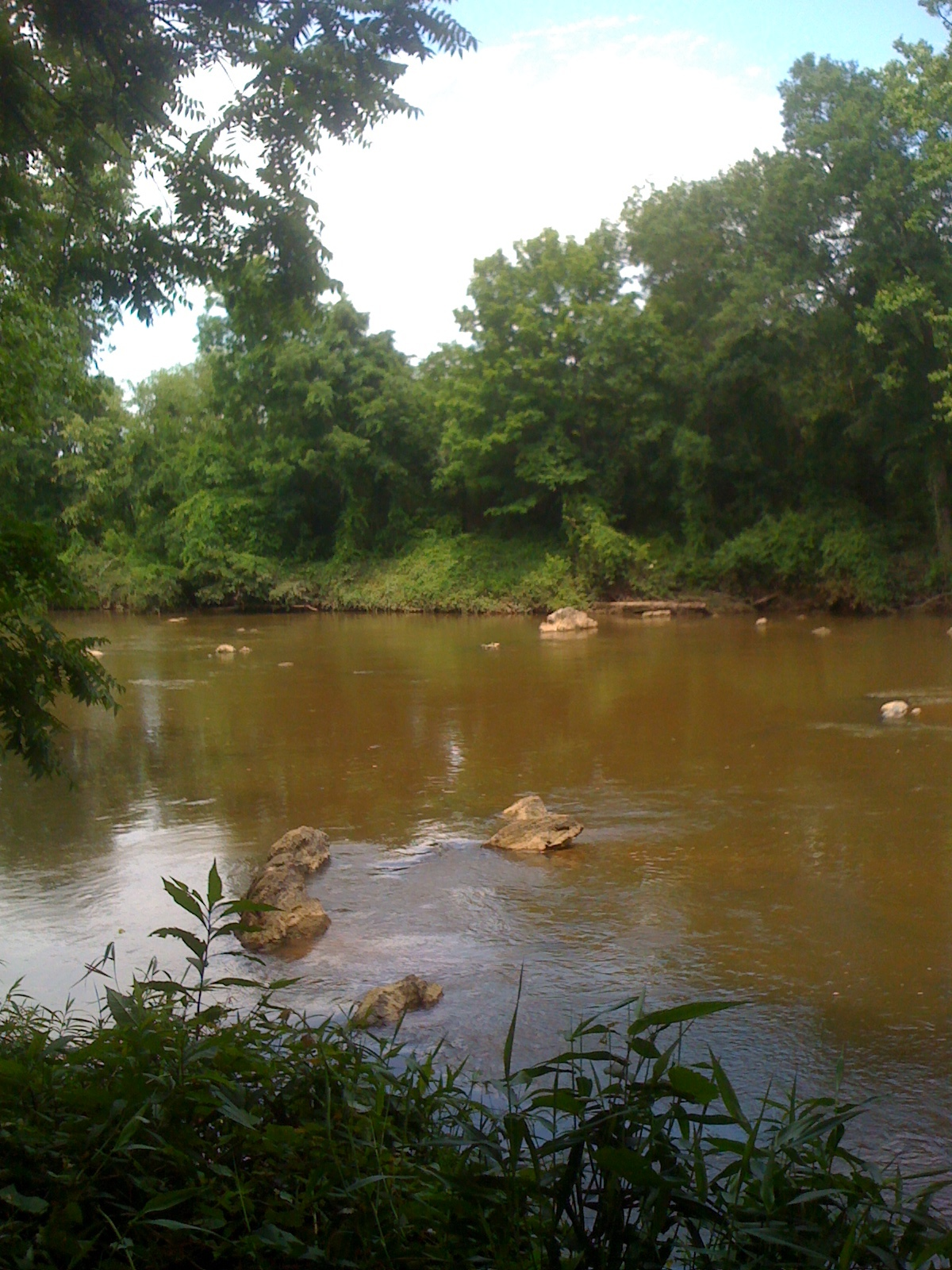
The Haw River within Haw River State Park

For over one hundred years, textile and other industries built the economy of North Carolina. Many located along the Haw and other river basins, providing employment and centers for communities since the Civil War era. Today, a few mills continue to operate near and on the Haw River, including Copland Mills in Burlington, North Carolina. The Haw also provides drinking water and recreational activities to a large portion of North Carolina, as 10% of the state's population lives in the Haw River Watershed. The conservation of the Haw River is now the focus of several groups and government agencies, who are working to develop and preserve the Haw River.

Traditional farming has been the backbone of the economy in the rural counties lining the Haw. Though farming is under pressure, it continues to thrive, providing poultry, beef, grain, and other products for American consumption, bolstering a main export of the state.

As a part of conservation efforts has been the development of three trails. The Haw River Trail is a conservation and recreation initiative formally undertaken by local governments and private groups in 2006, and will provide both a land trail and paddle trail connecting Haw River State Park and Jordan Lake State Recreation Area. The trail is part of the North Carolina Mountains to Sea Trail. A second major trail which has been established by local governments is the Haw River Wine Trail. The Haw River Valley has become a renowned grape growing region. The trail was originally established with five wineries in Guilford and Alamance Counties. Four wineries are open on the trail and they have all produced award-winning wines. The fifth winery, a family-operated business, closed in January 2008. There are several other wineries in the area that are not currently part of the trail.

The State of North Carolina has set up a state park on the Haw River in Guilford and Rockingham counties. There are also several city and county parks and golf courses located on the Haw, including Greensboro National Golf Club in Guilford County; Indian Valley Golf Course, Great Bend Park at Glencoe, Town and Country Park, The Challenge Golf Club, Quarry Hills Country Club, Swepsonville River Park, and Southwick Golf Course in Alamance County; and Robeson Creek Recreation Area and New Hope Overlook Campground located at the Jordan Lake State Recreation Area in Chatham County.

== PFAS Contamination ==
Since 2013, the Haw River and Cape Fear River watershed have been documented to have a per- and polyfluoroalkyl substance (PFAS) contamination problem. Researchers at North Carolina State University found that combined PFOA and PFOS concentrations went beyond the EPA's lifetime health advisory level of 70 parts per trillion on 57 of 127 days of sampling in Pittsboro alone. The same study by these researches revealed GenX, a newer PFAS compound that is used as a replacement for PFOA, at a much higher concentration further downstream near a chemical manufacturing plant. They also found that conventional water treatment does not remove it.

== Tributaries ==
Tributaries of the Haw River in Chatham County, North Carolina

Name, Bank	Watershed Area in Square Miles (km^{2})	Average Discharge	Stream Length	Mouth Coordinates	Mouth Elevation	Source Coordinates	Source Elevation	% of Average Discharge	Remarks
Mouth	1,707.00 square miles (4,421.1 km^{2})	1,727.41 cu ft/s (48.915 m^{3}/s)	110 mi (180 km)	35°35′46″N 079°03′09″W	154 ft (47 m)	36°08′55″N 080°02′28″W	1,007 ft (307 m)	N/A	The Haw River rises northeast of Kernersville, North Carolina and then flows northeast into Rockingham County where it curves southeast to meet the Cape Fear River near Moncure, North Carolina.
Shaddox Creek, left bank	15.21 square miles (39.4 km^{2})	17.72 cu ft/s (0.502 m^{3}/s)	3.83 mi (6.16 km)	35°35′57″N 079°02′59″W	164 ft (50 m)	35°39′07″N 078°59′32″W	295 ft (90 m)	1%	Shaddox Creek rises in a pond about 1 mile northeast of Merry Oaks, North Carolina on the divide between Shaddox Creek and Buckhorn Creek. Shaddox Creek is a 3rd order tributary that flows generally south to meet the Haw River about 2 miles southeast of Moncure, North Carolina.
New Hope River, left bank	342.98 square miles (888.3 km^{2})	377.12 cu ft/s (10.679 m^{3}/s)	12.19 mi (19.62 km)	35°39′38″N 079°04′14″W	216 ft (66 m)	35°48′37″N 078°59′48″W	216 ft (66 m)	21.8%	The New Hope River is entirely flooded by B. Everett Jordan Lake and is formed at the confluence of New Hope Creek and Morgan Creek. The mouth and source elevations are the normal pool elevations for the lake. The New Hope River contributes 21.8% of the total discharge for the Haw River.
Stinking Creek, right bank	6.49 square miles (16.8 km^{2})	7.91 cu ft/s (0.224 m^{3}/s)	4.41 mi (7.10 km)	35°41′00″N 079°04′46″W	216 ft (66 m)	35°40′49″N 079°08′07″W	480 ft (150 m)	< 1%	Stinking Creek forms an arm of B. Everett Jordan Lake. The 2nd order tributary rises about 4 miles southeast of Pittsboro, North Carolina on the divide between Stinking Creek and Roberson Creek and then flows south, east, and then northeast in a semi-circle to meet the Haw River.
Roberson Creek, right bank	28.11 square miles (72.8 km^{2})	33.00 cu ft/s (0.934 m^{3}/s)	11.81 mi (19.01 km)	35°42′09″N 079°05′02″W	216 ft (66 m)	35°42′04″N 079°13′34″W	460 ft (140 m)	1.9%	Roberson Creek, a 3rd order tributary, forms an arm of B. Everett Jordan Lake. It rises about 0.5 miles northeast of Round Top Mountain on the divide between Roberson Creek and the Rocky River. The stream then flows generally east to meet the Haw River at the lake.
Haven Creek, right bank	3.23 square miles (8.4 km^{2})	4.08 cu ft/s (0.116 m^{3}/s)	3.85 mi (6.20 km)	35°45′26″N 079°07′45″W	285 ft (87 m)	35°45′27″N 079°09′39″W	530 ft (160 m)	< 1%	Haven Creek, a 2nd order tributary, rises about 1 mile northeast of Pittsboro, North Carolina on the Roberson Creek divide. The stream then flows north and then turns east to meet the Haw River about 1 mile southeast of Bynum, North Carolina.
Pokeberry Creek, left bank	12.81 square miles (33.2 km^{2})	15.62 cu ft/s (0.442 m^{3}/s)	7.82 mi (12.59 km)	35°45′49″N 079°07′52″W	292 ft (89 m)	35°50′28″N 079°07′26″W	552 ft (168 m)	1%	Pokeberry Creek, a 3rd order tributary, rises on the divide between Pokeberry Creek and Morgan Creek about 5 miles southwest of Chapel Hill, North Carolina. It then flows southwest to meet the Haw River about 1 mile southeast of Bynum, North Carolina.
Brooks Creek, right bank	9.90 square miles (25.6 km^{2})	12.09 cu ft/s (0.342 m^{3}/s)	6.79 mi (10.93 km)	35°46′29″N 079°09′00″W	305 ft (93 m)	35°46′37″N 079°14′32″W	505 ft (154 m)	< 1%	Brooks Creek, a 3rd order tributary, rises in a pond about 1.5 miles north of Gum Springs, North Carolina on the Dry Creek divide. Brooks Creek then flows east to meet the Haw River at Bynum, North Carolina.
Wilkinson Creek, left bank	9.09 square miles (23.5 km^{2})	11.34 cu ft/s (0.321 m^{3}/s)	7.77 mi (12.50 km)	35°46′57″N 079°09′46″W	320 ft (98 m)	35°51′23″N 079°09′06″W	580 ft (180 m)	< 1%	Wilkinson Creek, a 3rd order tributary, rises about 1 mile east of Terrells Mountain on the Neville Creek divide. Wilkinson Creek then flows southwest to meet the Haw River about 1 mile northwest of Bynum.
Dry Creek, right bank	20.21 square miles (52.3 km^{2})	24.47 cu ft/s (0.693 m^{3}/s)	12.89 mi (20.74 km)	35°47′44″N 079°10′54″W	338 ft (103 m)	35°44′29″N 079°21′10″W	630 ft (190 m)	1.4%	Dry Creek, a 2nd order tributary, rises about 4 miles south-southeast of Silk Hope, North Carolina on the Rocky River divide. Dry Creek then flows roughly northeast to meet the Haw River about 2 miles northwest of Bynum.
Terrells Creek, left bank	15.91 square miles (41.2 km^{2})	19.40 cu ft/s (0.549 m^{3}/s)	7.44 mi (11.97 km)	35°49′17″N 079°11′25″W	357 ft (109 m)	35°54′26″N 079°10′49″W	580 ft (180 m)	1.1%	Terrells Creek (left bank) is a 3rd order tributary that rises about 1 mile southeast of White Cross, North Carolina on the Collins Creek divide. Terrells Creek then flows south from Orange County into Chatham County to meet the Haw River about 4 miles northwest of Bynum.
Terrells Creek, right bank	29.13 square miles (75.4 km^{2})	34.85 cu ft/s (0.987 m^{3}/s)	12.47 mi (20.07 km)	35°51′00″N 079°14′10″W	374 ft (114 m)	35°58′19″N 079°10′03″W	618 ft (188 m)	2%	Terrells Creek (right bank) is a 3rd order tributary that rises in a pond about 0.25 miles north of Silk Hope, North Carolina on the Varnell Creek divide. Terrells Creek then flows northeast to meet the Haw River about 1 mile north of Terrells, North Carolina.
Collins Creek, left bank	19.58 square miles (50.7 km^{2})	23.62 cu ft/s (0.669 m^{3}/s)	11.73 mi (18.88 km)	35°51′00″N 079°14′10″W	387 ft (118 m)	35°55′19″N 079°10′03″W	618 ft (188 m)	1.4%	Collins Creek, a 3rd order tributary, rises at Dodsons Crossroads, North Carolina on the Morgan Creek divide. Collins Creek then flows south to meet the Haw River about 2 miles east of Mandale, North Carolina.

Tributaries of the Haw River in Alamance County, North Carolina

Name, Bank	Watershed Area in Square Miles (km^{2})	Average Discharge	Stream Length	Mouth Coordinates	Mouth Elevation	Source Coordinates	Source Elevation	% of Average Discharge	Remarks
Big Branch, right bank	3.10 square miles (8.0 km^{2})	3.97 cu ft/s (0.112 m^{3}/s)	2.78 mi (4.47 km)	35°51′49″N 079°15′59″W	390 ft (120 m)	35°51′26″N 079°17′09″W	550 ft (170 m)	< 1%	Big Branch, a 2nd order tributary, rises about 2 miles west-northwest of Mandale, North Carolina on the Lick Creek divide. Big Branch then flows easterly to meet the Haw River about 1.5 miles northeast of Mandale, North Carolina.
Cane Creek, right bank	68.06 square miles (176.3 km^{2})	77.97 cu ft/s (2.208 m^{3}/s)	24.21 mi (38.96 km)	35°53′01″N 079°15′18″W	395 ft (120 m)	35°53′37″N 079°30′44″W	700 ft (210 m)	4.5%	Cane Creek (right bank), a 4th order tributary, rises about 3 miles northwest of Pleasantville, North Carolina on the Poppaw Creek divide. Cane Creek then flows east to meet the Haw River about 3 miles southeast of Eli Whitney, North Carolina.
Cane Creek, left bank	39.25 square miles (101.7 km^{2})	43.21 cu ft/s (1.224 m^{3}/s)	13.74 mi (22.11 km)	35°54′35″N 079°16′06″W	398 ft (121 m)	36°02′05″N 079°10′24″W	680 ft (210 m)	2.5%	Cane Creek (left bank), a 4th order tributary, rises about 2 miles of Buckhorn, North Carolina in Orange County on the Eno River divide. Cane Creek then flows southwest into Alamance County to meet the Haw River about 2 miles east of Eli Whitney, North Carolina.
Marys Creek, right bank	12.51 square miles (32.4 km^{2})	14.80 cu ft/s (0.419 m^{3}/s)	9.74 mi (15.68 km)	35°55′28″N 079°17′56″W	407 ft (124 m)	35°56′27″N 079°24′06″W	735 ft (224 m)	< 1%	Marys Creek, a 3rd order tributary, rises about 5 miles southeast of Rock Creek, North Carolina on the Varnals Creek divide. Marys Creek then flows east to meet the Haw River about 3 miles southeast of Saxapahaw, North Carolina.
Motes Creek, left bank	5.62 square miles (14.6 km^{2})	6.81 cu ft/s (0.193 m^{3}/s)	5.39 mi (8.67 km)	35°56′34″N 079°18′56″W	413 ft (126 m)	35°59′48″N 079°17′13″W	640 ft (200 m)	< 1%	Motes Creek, a 3rd order tributary, rises about 4 miles northeast of Saxapahaw, North Carolina on the Cane Creek divide. Motes Creek then flows southeast to meet the Haw River at Saxapahaw.
Meadow Creek, left bank	4.66 square miles (12.1 km^{2})	5.65 cu ft/s (0.160 m^{3}/s)	5.95 mi (9.58 km)	35°58′28″N 079°20′43″W	449 ft (137 m)	36°00′36″N 079°15′59″W	645 ft (197 m)	< 1%	Meadow Creek, a 2nd order tributary, rises about 6 miles south of Mebane, North Carolina on the Toms Creek divide. Meadow Creek then flows southwest to the meet the Haw River about 4 miles northwest of Saxapahaw.
Varnals Creek, left bank	11.83 square miles (30.6 km^{2})	13.62 cu ft/s (0.386 m^{3}/s)	7.13 mi (11.47 km)	35°59′10″N 079°21′04″W	449 ft (137 m)	35°56′53″N 079°21′04″W	630 ft (190 m)	< 1%	Varnals Creek, a 3rd order tributary, rises about 2 southeast of Rock Creek, North Carolina on the Rock Creek divide just north of the Cane Creek Mountains. Varnals Creek then flows northeast to meet the Haw River about 4 miles south of Swepsonville, North Carolina.
Haw Creek, left bank	28.41 square miles (73.6 km^{2})	32.14 cu ft/s (0.910 m^{3}/s)	12.84 mi (20.66 km)	35°59′37″N 079°21′06″W	453 ft (138 m)	36°04′55″N 079°13′37″W	690 ft (210 m)	1.9%	Haw Creek, a 3rd order tributary, rises in a pond about 0.5 miles southeast of Mebane, North Carolina in Orange County on the Mill Creek divide. Haw Creek then flows southwest into Alamance County to meet the Haw River about 3 miles south of Swepsonville, North Carolina.
Big Alamance Creek, right bank	262.23 square miles (679.2 km^{2})	268.41 cu ft/s (7.601 m^{3}/s)	37.12 mi (59.74 km)	36°01′02″N 079°21′57″W	552 ft (168 m)	35°58′40″N 079°44′57″W	780 ft (240 m)	15.5%	Big Alamance Creek (Great Alamance Creek), a 5th order tributary, rise about 1 mile north of Pleasant Garden, North Carolina in Guilford County on the Deep River divide. The creek then flows northeast into Alamance County then east to meet the Haw River at Swepsonville. Big Alamance Creek contributes 15.5% of the total discharge for the Haw River.
Back Creek, left bank	81.21 square miles (210.3 km^{2})	88.66 cu ft/s (2.511 m^{3}/s)	8.77 mi (14.11 km)	36°02′44″N 079°22′04″W	476 ft (145 m)	36°07′31″N 079°18′02″W	720 ft (220 m)	5.1%	Back Creek, a 4th order tributary, rises in a pond about 0.5 miles northeast of Carr, North Carolina in Orange County on the Lynch Creek divide. Back Creek then flows generally southwest to Alamance County and through Quaker Creek Reservoir to meet the Haw River about 1.5 miles southeast of Graham, North Carolina.
Boyds Creek, left bank	7.38 square miles (19.1 km^{2})	8.53 cu ft/s (0.242 m^{3}/s)	4.54 mi (7.31 km)	36°06′08″N 079°22′51″W	492 ft (150 m)	36°09′16″N 079°20′30″W	700 ft (210 m)	< 1%	Boyds Creek, a 2nd order tributary, rises in a pond about 3 miles southeast of McCray, North Carolina on the Deep Creek divide. The creek then flows southwest to meet the Haw River about 1 mile northwest of Haw River, North Carolina.
Service Creek, right bank	8.01 square miles (20.7 km^{2})	9.10 cu ft/s (0.258 m^{3}/s)	5.93 mi (9.54 km)	36°06′32″N 079°23′35″W	499 ft (152 m)	36°06′51″N 079°28′15″W	690 ft (210 m)	< 1%	Service Creek, a 2nd order tributary, rises in a pond at Glen Raven on the Little Alamance Creek divide. The creek then flows northeast then southeast to meet the Haw River about 0.25 miles east of Burlington, North Carolina.
Stony Creek, left bank	104.63 square miles (271.0 km^{2})	113.63 cu ft/s (3.218 m^{3}/s)	17.10 mi (27.52 km)	36°07′10″N 079°24′06″W	502 ft (153 m)	36°18′23″N 079°27′12″W	730 ft (220 m)	6.6%	Stony Creek, a 4th order tributary, rises in Cherry Grove, North Carolina in Caswell County on the Country Line Creek divide. Stony Creek then flows south into Alamance County and passes west of Stony Creek Mountain and into Lake Burlington. It is impounded again in Stony Creek Reservoir before meeting the Haw River at Hopedale, North Carolina.
Travis Creek, right bank	15.70 square miles (40.7 km^{2})	17.76 cu ft/s (0.503 m^{3}/s)	6.54 mi (10.53 km)	36°08′33″N 079°29′12″W	564 ft (172 m)	36°07′56″N 079°34′49″W	720 ft (220 m)	1%	Travis Creek, a 3rd order tributary, rises about 3 miles northwest of Gibsonville, North Carolina in Guilford County on the Buffalo Creek divide. Travis Creek then flows generally northeast to meet the Haw River about 3 miles north of Glen Raven, North Carolina.
Reedy Fork, right bank	255.27 square miles (661.1 km^{2})	255.75 cu ft/s (7.242 m^{3}/s)	43.30 mi (69.68 km)	36°10′08″N 079°30′00″W	584 ft (178 m)	36°07′19″N 080°04′07″W	955 ft (291 m)	14.8%	Reedy Fork, a 5th order tributary, rises in a pond in Kernersville, North Carolina in Forsyth County on the Kerners Mill Creek divide. Reedy Fork then flows generally east through Guilford County to Alamance County to meet the Haw River about 0.5 miles east of Ossipee, North Carolina. Reedy Fork contributes 14.8% of the total discharge for the Haw River.

Tributaries of the Haw River in Rockingham County, North Carolina

Name, Bank	Watershed Area in Square Miles (km^{2})	Average Discharge	Stream Length	Mouth Coordinates	Mouth Elevation	Source Coordinates	Source Elevation	% of Average Discharge	Remarks
Giles Creek, left bank	2.88 square miles (7.5 km^{2})	3.69 cu ft/s (0.104 m^{3}/s)	2.08 mi (3.35 km)	36°15′49″N 079°34′59″W	636 ft (194 m)	36°17′08″N 079°33′27″W	760 ft (230 m)	< 1%	Giles Creek, a 1st order tributary, rises in a pond about 3 miles east of Williamsburg, North Carolina in Rockingham County on the Country Line Creek (Dan River) divide. The creek then flows south to meet the Haw River about 2 miles south of Williamsburg, North Carolina.
Rose Creek, right bank	5.69 square miles (14.7 km^{2})	7.00 cu ft/s (0.198 m^{3}/s)	3.92 mi (6.31 km)	36°16′06″N 079°36′28″W	650 ft (200 m)	36°13′21″N 079°38′16″W	768 ft (234 m)	< 1%	Rose Creek, a 2nd order tributary, rises in Apple Pond about 1.5 miles west of Ossipee, North Carolina in Guilford County on the Reedy Fork divide. Rose Creek then flows north into Rockingham County to meet the Haw River about 1 mile south of Williamsburg, North Carolina.
Little Troublesome Creek, left bank	13.00 square miles (33.7 km^{2})	16.37 cu ft/s (0.464 m^{3}/s)	8.26 mi (13.29 km)	36°16′11″N 079°36′29″W	650 ft (200 m)	36°20′54″N 079°41′49″W	810 ft (250 m)	1%	Little Troublesome Creek, a 2nd order tributary, rises in Reidsville, North Carolina and then flows southeast to meet the Haw River about 1 mile southwest of Williamsburg, North Carolina.
Troublesome Creek, left bank	55.96 square miles (144.9 km^{2})	65.59 cu ft/s (1.857 m^{3}/s)	23.67 mi (38.09 km)	36°15′57″N 079°38′35″W	653 ft (199 m)	36°14′49″N 079°59′37″W	960 ft (290 m)	3.8%	Troublesome Creek, a 3rd order tributary, rises in Stokesdale, North Carolina in Guilford County on the Kings Creek (Dan River) divide. The creek then flows northeast into Rockingham County then southeast through Lake Reidsville to meet the Haw River about 5 miles south of Reidsville.
Candy Creek, right bank	3.10 square miles (8.0 km^{2})	3.90 cu ft/s (0.110 m^{3}/s)	3.03 mi (4.88 km)	36°15′54″N 079°38′56″W	675 ft (206 m)	36°13′17″N 079°39′31″W	780 ft (240 m)	< 1%	Candy Creek, a 1st order tributary, rises about 1 mile east of Monticello, North Carolina in Guilford County on the Reedy Fork divide. The creek then flows north into Rockingham County to meet the Haw River about 5 miles south of Reidsville.
Benaja Creek, right bank	10.58 square miles (27.4 km^{2})	12.67 cu ft/s (0.359 m^{3}/s)	3.73 mi (6.00 km)	36°15′53″N 079°39′26″W	675 ft (206 m)	36°14′53″N 079°42′22″W	780 ft (240 m)	< 1%	Benaja Creek, a 2nd order tributary, rises in a pond about 3 miles north of Browns Summit, North Carolina in Guilford County on the Haw River divide. The creek then flows northeast into Rockingham County and meets the Haw River about 5 miles south of Reidsville.

Tributaries of the Haw River in Guilford County, North Carolina

Name, Bank	Watershed Area in Square Miles (km^{2})	Average Discharge	Stream Length	Mouth Coordinates	Mouth Elevation	Source Coordinates	Source Elevation	% of Average Discharge	Remarks
Mears Fork, right bank	12.59 square miles (32.6 km^{2})	14.63 cu ft/s (0.414 m^{3}/s)	7.77 mi (12.50 km)	36°14′51″N 079°47′04″W	699 ft (213 m)	36°12′32″N 079°53′57″W	878 ft (268 m)	< 1%	Mears Fork, a 3rd order tributary, rises in Summerfield, North Carolina on the Reedy Fork divide. Mears Fork then flows northeast to meet the Haw River about 2 miles south of Midway, North Carolina.
Rock Branch, left bank	2.40 square miles (6.2 km^{2})	3.03 cu ft/s (0.086 m^{3}/s)	2.00 mi (3.22 km)	36°12′43″N 079°57′35″W	778 ft (237 m)	36°12′51″N 079°59′14″W	925 ft (282 m)	< 1%	Rock Branch, a 1st order tributary, rises in a pond at Kings Crossroads, North Carolina on the Kings Creek divide. Rock Branch then flows generally southeast to meet the Haw River about 1.5 miles east of Kings Crossroads.

== Cities, towns, and communities ==
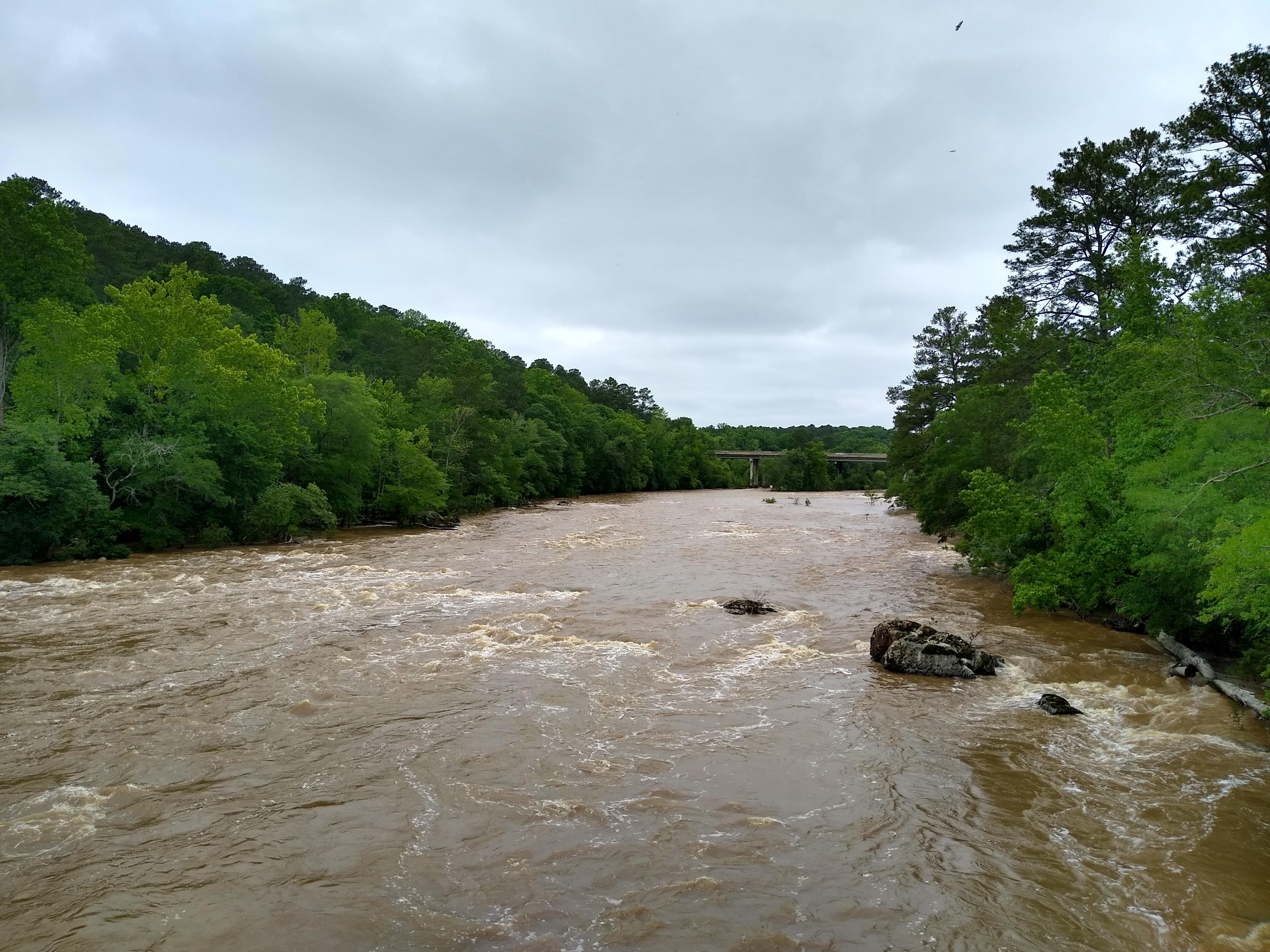
The Haw River near Bynum

In Chatham County

- Pittsboro
- Haywood
- Bynum

In Alamance County

- Saxapahaw
- Swepsonville
- Graham
- Haw River
- Burlington
- Carolina
- Glencoe
- Ossipee
- Altamahaw

In Guilford County

- Oak Ridge

In Forsyth County

- The Haw begins approximately 1-mile (1.6 km) northeast of Kernersville.

== Dams ==
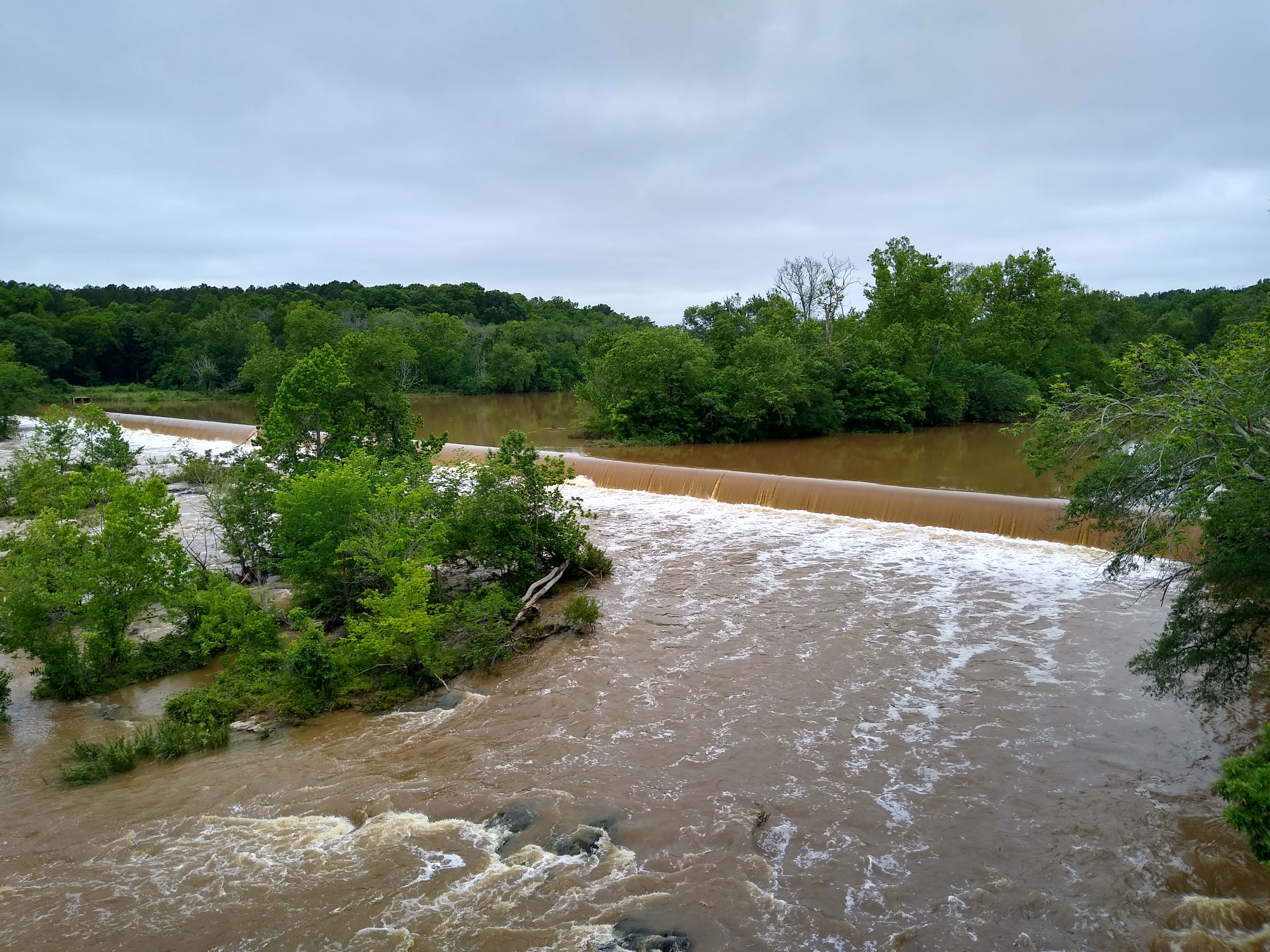
Bynum Dam

The Haw River has been dammed many times throughout its history to provide power for mills, irrigation for crops, and drinking water supplies. Some remnants of dams are still visible. These dams are extant on the Haw River:

- B. Everett Jordan Dam - 113 ft (34 m)
- Bynum Dam - 8 ft (2.4 m)
- Saxapahaw Dam - 30 ft (9.1 m)
- Puryear Dam - 10 ft (3.0 m)
- Old Swepsonville Dam - 5 ft (1.5 m)
- Granite Mills Dam (removed in 2016)
- Glencoe Mills Dam - 10 ft (3.0 m)
- Indian Valley Dam
- Altamahaw Dam - 8 ft (2.4 m)
