= Marys Creek (Haw River tributary) =

Stream in North Carolina, USA

Marys Creek Tributary to Haw River
- Location of Marys Creek mouth Marys Creek (Haw River tributary) (the United States)

Location
- Country: United States
- State: North Carolina
- County: Alamance

Physical characteristics
- Source: divide between Marys Creek and Varnals Creek
  - location: about 5 miles southeast of Rock Creek, North Carolina on the west side of Bass Mountain
  - coordinates: 35°56′27″N 079°24′06″W
  - elevation: 735 ft (224 m)
- Mouth: Haw River
  - location: about 3 miles southeast of Saxapahaw, North Carolina
  - coordinates: 35°55′28″N 079°17′56″W
  - elevation: 407 ft (124 m)
- Length: 9.74 mi (15.68 km)
- Basin size: 12.51 square miles (32.4 km^{2})
- Discharge
  - location: Haw River
  - average: 14.80 cu ft/s (0.419 m^{3}/s) at mouth with Haw River

Basin features
- Progression: Haw River → Cape Fear River → Atlantic Ocean
- River system: Haw River
- Tributaries
  - left: unnamed tributaries
  - right: unnamed tributaries
- Bridges: Thompson Mill Road, Snow Camp Road, Jewell Road, Lindley Mill Road, Stockard Road, NC 87, Whitney Road

Marys Creek is a 9.74 mi (15.68 km) long 3rd order tributary to the Haw River, in Alamance County, North Carolina.

== Course ==
Marys Creek rises on the west side of Bass Mountain, about 5 miles southeast of Rock Creek in Alamance County, North Carolina and then flows east to the Haw River about 3 miles southeast of Saxapahaw, North Carolina.

== Watershed ==
Marys Creek drains 12.51 square miles (32.4 km^{2}) of area, receives about 46.6 in/year of precipitation, and has a wetness index of 425.73 and is about 44% forested.

== See also ==
- List of rivers of North Carolina

== Additional Maps ==
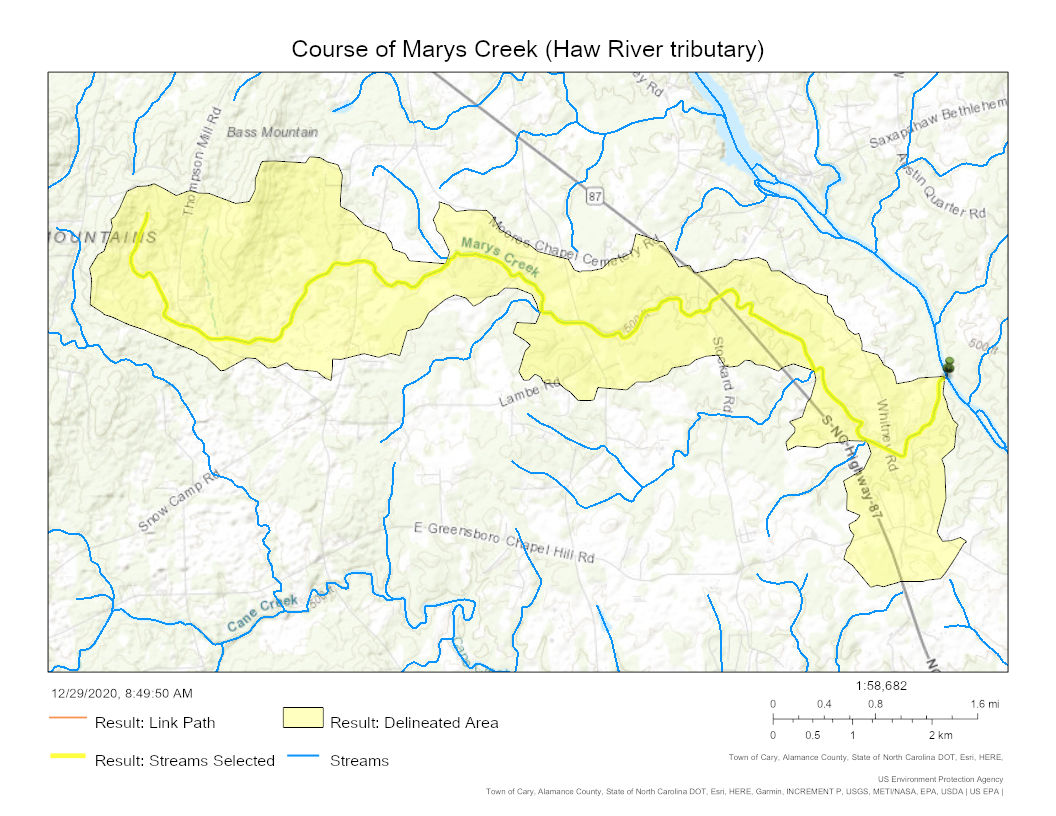
Course of Marys Creek (Haw River tributary) in Alamance County, North Carolina

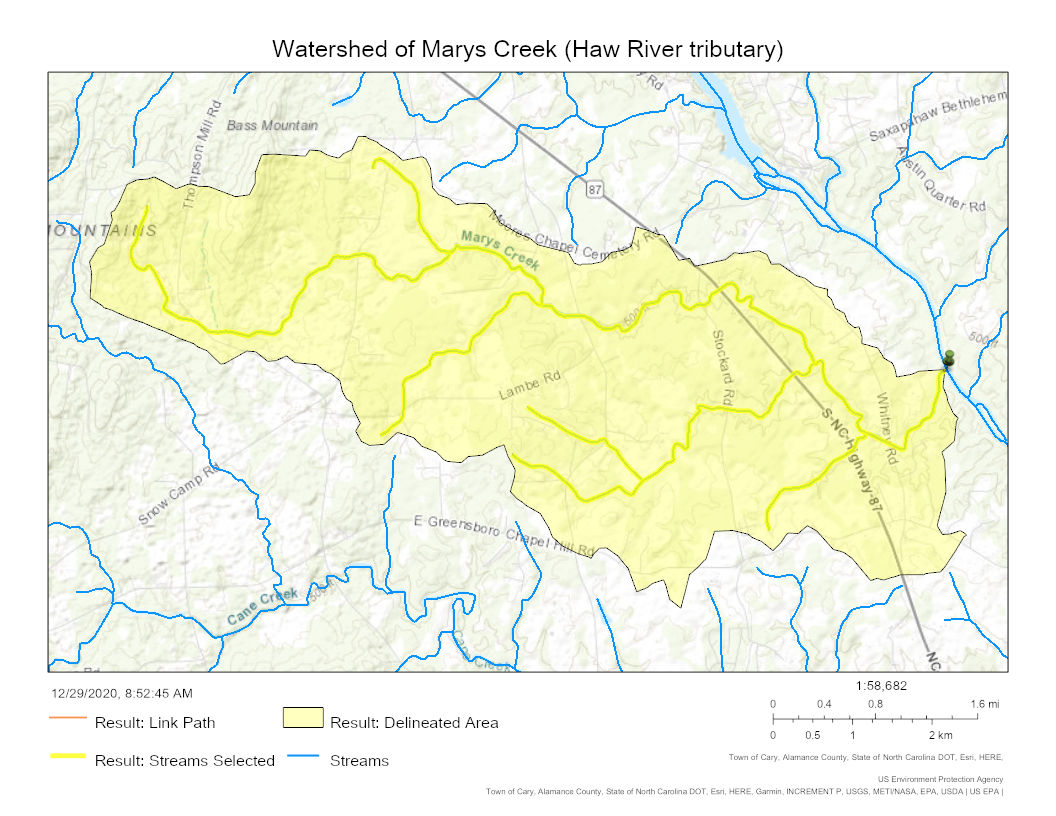
Watershed of Marys Creek (Haw River tributary) in Alamance County, North Carolina
