= Service Creek =

Service Creek may refer to:

- Service Creek (Haw River tributary), a stream in Alamance County, North Carolina
- Service Creek, Oregon, an unincorporated community
