= Wilkinson Creek (Haw River tributary) =

Stream in North Carolina, USA

Wilkinson Creek Tributary to Haw River
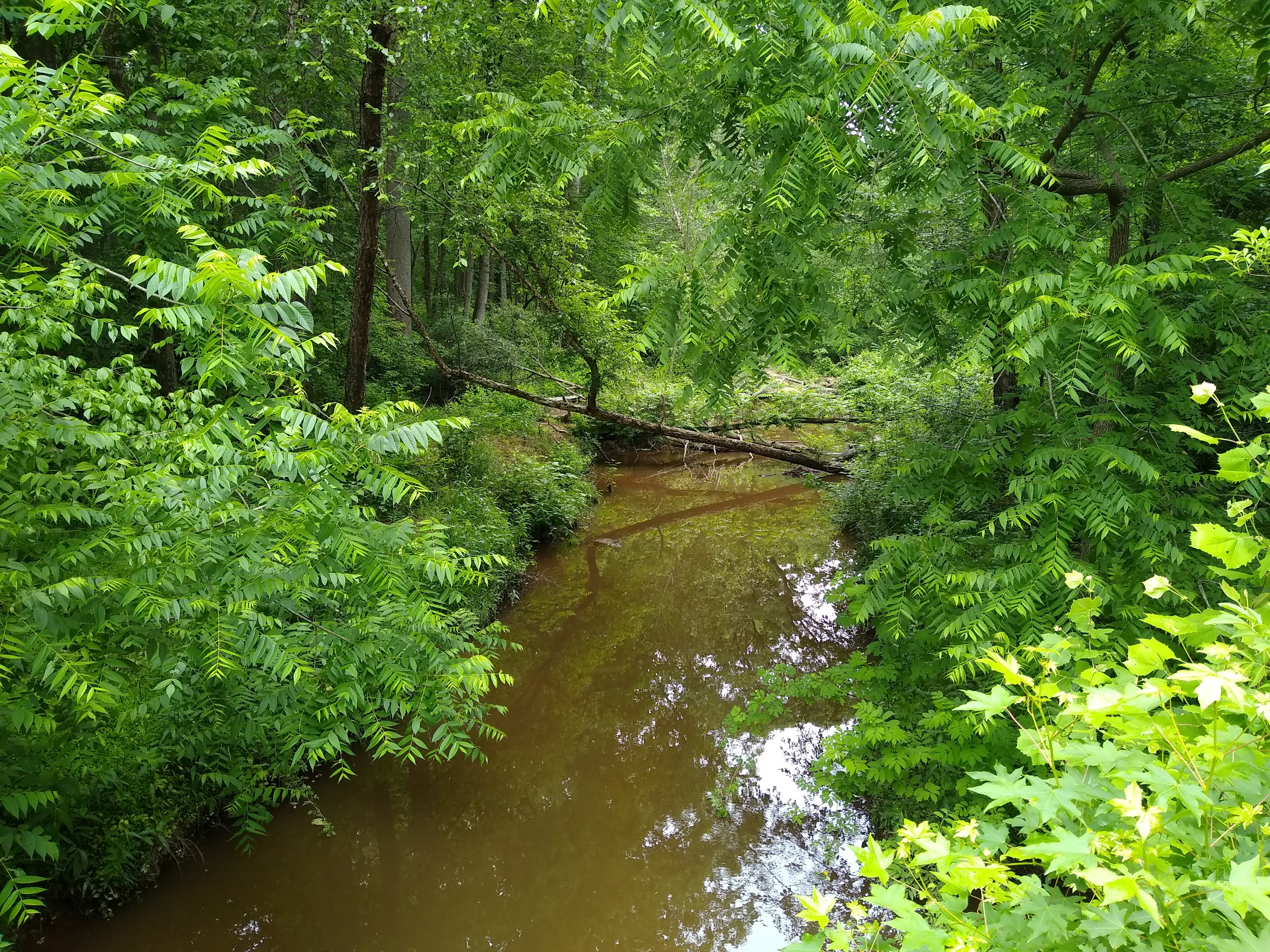

- Location of Wilkinson Creek mouth Wilkinson Creek (Haw River tributary) (the United States)

Location
- Country: United States
- State: North Carolina
- County: Chatham

Physical characteristics
- Source: divide between Wilkinson Creek and Neville Creek
  - location: about 1 mile east of Terrells Mountain
  - coordinates: 35°51′23″N 079°09′06″W
  - elevation: 580 ft (180 m)
- Mouth: Haw River
  - location: about 1 mile northwest of Bynum, North Carolina
  - coordinates: 35°46′57″N 079°09′46″W
  - elevation: 320 ft (98 m)
- Length: 7.77 mi (12.50 km)
- Basin size: 9.09 square miles (23.5 km^{2})
- Discharge
  - location: Haw River
  - average: 11.34 cu ft/s (0.321 m^{3}/s) at mouth with Haw River

Basin features
- Progression: Haw River → Cape Fear River → Atlantic Ocean
- River system: Haw River
- Tributaries
  - left: unnamed tributaries
  - right: unnamed tributaries
- Bridges: Wilkinson Creek Lane, Gilmore Road, Lamont Norwood Road, Tobacco Road, Manns Chapel Road, Andrews Store Road, Hamlets Chapel Road

Wilkinson Creek is a 7.77 mi (12.50 km) long 2nd order tributary to the Haw River in Chatham County, North Carolina.

== Course ==
Wilkinson Creek rises about 1 mile east of Terrells Mountain in Chatham County and then flows south to the Haw River upstream of Bynum.

== Watershed ==
Wilkinson Creek drains 9.09 square miles (23.5 km^{2}) of area, receives about 47.4 in/year of precipitation, and has a wetness index of 392.39 and is about 77% forested.

== See also ==
- List of rivers of North Carolina

== Additional maps ==
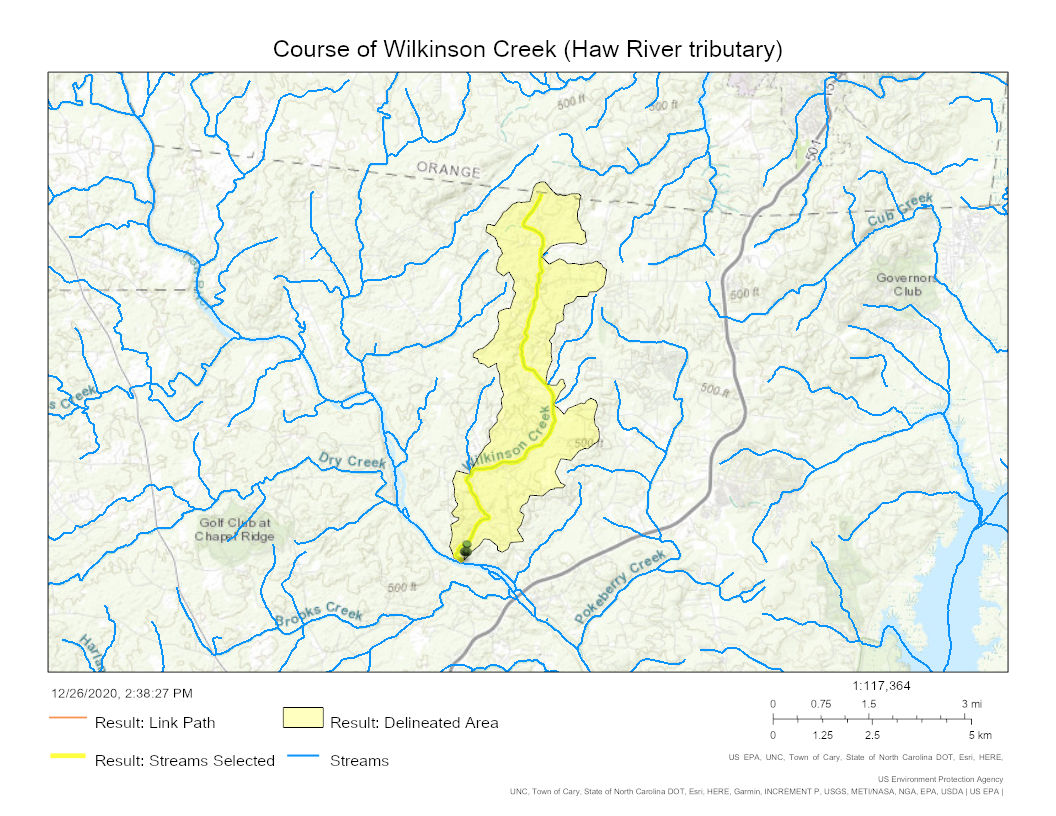
Course of Wilkinson Creek (Haw River tributary) in Chatham County, North Carolina

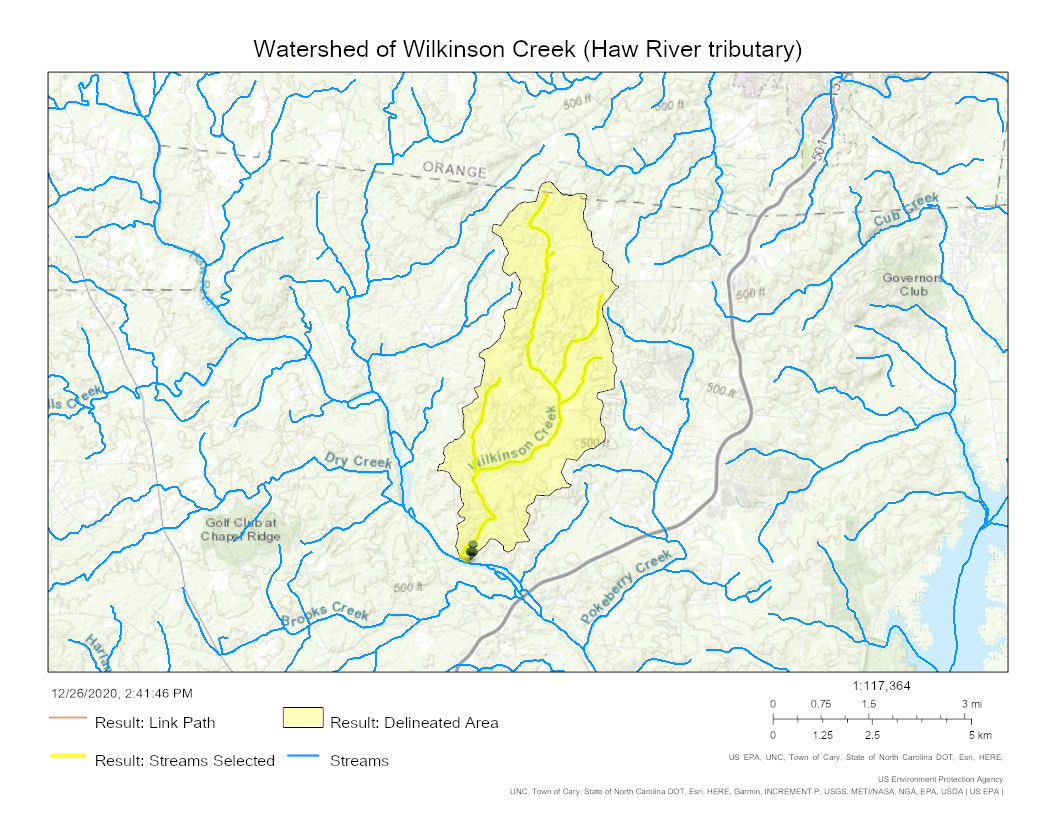
Watershed of Wilkinson Creek (Haw River tributary) in Chatham County, North Carolina
