= Rose Creek =

Rose Creek may refer to:

- Rose Creek (San Diego, California), an urban stream in San Diego, California
- Rose Creek (Haw River tributary), a tributary to the Haw River, Guilford and Rockingham County, North Carolina
- Rose Creek (Tuolumne County, California), a tributary of the Stanislaus River in Tuolumne County, California
- Rose Creek, Minnesota, a city in Mower County, Minnesota

== See also ==
- Rose Creek Township, Republic County, Kansas
