= Meadow Creek (Haw River tributary) =

Stream in North Carolina, USA

Meadow Creek Tributary to Haw River
- Location of Meadow Creek mouth Meadow Creek (Haw River tributary) (the United States)

Location
- Country: United States
- State: North Carolina
- County: Alamance

Physical characteristics
- Source: divide between Meadow Creek and Toms Creek (Cane Creek)
  - location: about 6 miles south of Mebane, North Carolina
  - coordinates: 36°00′36″N 079°15′59″W
  - elevation: 645 ft (197 m)
- Mouth: Haw River
  - location: about 4 miles northwest of Saxapahaw, North Carolina
  - coordinates: 35°58′28″N 079°20′43″W
  - elevation: 449 ft (137 m)
- Length: 6.29 mi (10.12 km)
- Basin size: 4.66 square miles (12.1 km^{2})
- Discharge
  - location: Haw River
  - average: 5.65 cu ft/s (0.160 m^{3}/s) at mouth with Haw River

Basin features
- Progression: Haw River → Cape Fear River → Atlantic Ocean
- River system: Haw River
- Tributaries
  - left: unnamed tributaries
  - right: unnamed tributaries
- Bridges: South Jim Minor Road, Hidden Lake Road, NC 54, Phillips Chapel Road, Preacher Davis Road, Swepsonville-Saxapahaw Road

Meadow Creek is a 6.29 mi (10.12 km) long 2nd order tributary to the Haw River, in Alamance County, North Carolina.

== Course ==
Meadow Creek rises on the divide between it and Toms Creek (Cane Creek), about 6 miles south of Mebane in Alamance County, North Carolina and then flows southwest to the Haw River about 4 miles northwest of Saxapahaw, North Carolina.

== Watershed ==
Meadow Creek drains 4.66 square miles (12.1 km^{2}) of area, receives about 46.3 in/year of precipitation, and has a wetness index of 435.67 and is about 50% forested.

== See also ==
- List of rivers of North Carolina
