= Haven Creek (Haw River tributary) =

Stream in North Carolina, USA

Haven Creek Tributary to Haw River
- Location of Haven Creek mouth Haven Creek (Haw River tributary) (the United States)

Location
- Country: United States
- State: North Carolina
- County: Chatham

Physical characteristics
- Source: Roberson Creek divide
  - location: about 1 mile northeast of Pittsboro, North Carolina
  - coordinates: 35°45′27″N 079°09′39″W
  - elevation: 530 ft (160 m)
- Mouth: Haw River
  - location: about 1 mile southeast of Bynum, North Carolina
  - coordinates: 35°45′27″N 079°09′39″W
  - elevation: 285 ft (87 m)
- Length: 3.85 mi (6.20 km)
- Basin size: 3.23 square miles (8.4 km^{2})
- Discharge
  - location: Haw River
  - average: 4.08 cu ft/s (0.116 m^{3}/s) at mouth with Haw River

Basin features
- Progression: Haw River → Cape Fear River → Atlantic Ocean
- River system: Haw River
- Tributaries
  - left: unnamed tributaries
  - right: unnamed tributaries
- Bridges: US 64, Suttles Road, Northwood High School Road

Haven Creek is a 3.85 mi (6.20 km) long 2nd order tributary to the Haw River in Chatham County, North Carolina. The name of Haven Creek comes from Haven Estate from which it flows.

== Course ==
Haven Creek rises about 1 mile northeast of Pittsboro, North Carolina in Chatham County and then flows north and east to the Haw River about 1 mile southeast of Bynum, North Carolina.

== Watershed ==
Haven Creek drains 3.23 square miles (8.4 km^{2}) of area, receives about 47.3 in/year of precipitation, and has a topographic wetness index of 399.92 and is about 64% forested.

== See also ==
- List of rivers of North Carolina

== Additional maps ==
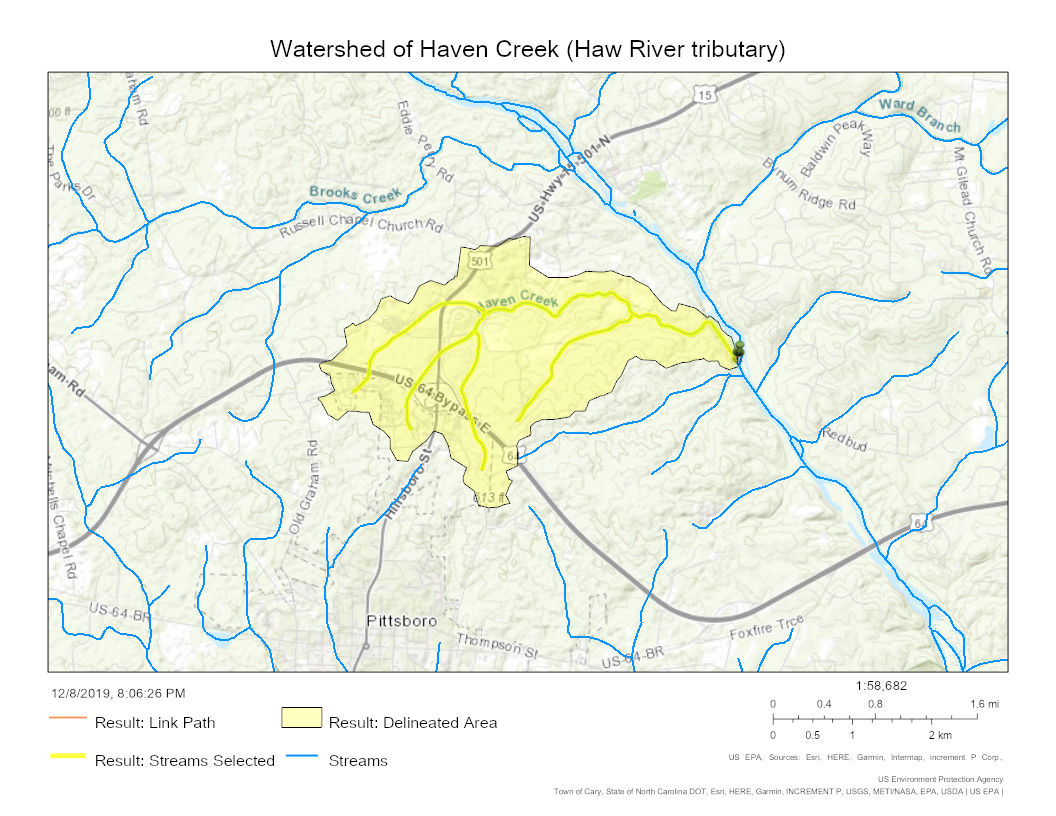
Watershed of Haven Creek (Haw River tributary)

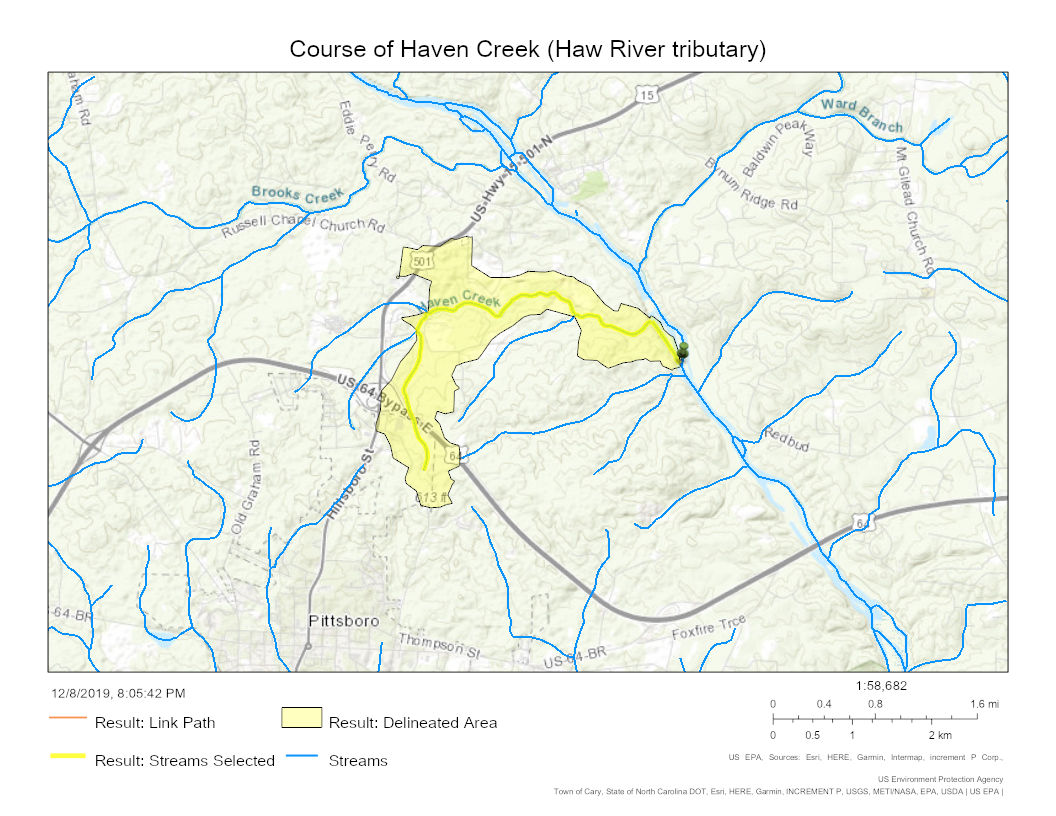
Course of Haven Creek (Haw River tributary)
