= Stinking Creek (Haw River tributary) =

Stream in North Carolina, USA

Stinking Creek Tributary to Haw River
- Location of Stinking Creek mouth Stinking Creek (Haw River tributary) (the United States)

Location
- Country: United States
- State: North Carolina
- County: Chatham

Physical characteristics
- Source: divide between Stinking Creek and Roberson Creek
  - location: about 4 miles southeast of Pittsboro, North Carolina
  - coordinates: 35°40′46″N 079°08′07″W
  - elevation: 480 ft (150 m)
- Mouth: Haw River
  - location: B. Everett Jordan Lake
  - coordinates: 35°41′00″N 079°04′46″W
  - elevation: 217 ft (66 m)
- Length: 4.41 mi (7.10 km)
- Basin size: 6.49 square miles (16.8 km^{2})
- Discharge
  - location: Haw River
  - average: 7.91 cu ft/s (0.224 m^{3}/s) at mouth with Haw River

Basin features
- Progression: Haw River → Cape Fear River → Atlantic Ocean
- River system: Haw River
- Tributaries
  - left: unnamed tributaries
  - right: unnamed tributaries
- Bridges: Moncure Pittsboro Road (x2), Gum Springs Church Road

Stinking Creek is a 4.41 mi (7.10 km) long 2nd order tributary to the Haw River in Chatham County, North Carolina.

== Course ==
Stinking Creek rises about 4 miles southeast of Pittsboro, North Carolina in Chatham County and then flows in a semi-circle to the Haw River at B. Everett Jordan Lake. Stinking Creek makes up one of the arms of the lake.

== Watershed ==
Stinking Creek drains 6.49 square miles (16.8 km^{2}) of area, receives about 47.5 in/year of precipitation, and has a wetness index of 383.56 and is about 79% forested.

== See also ==
- List of rivers of North Carolina

== Additional images ==
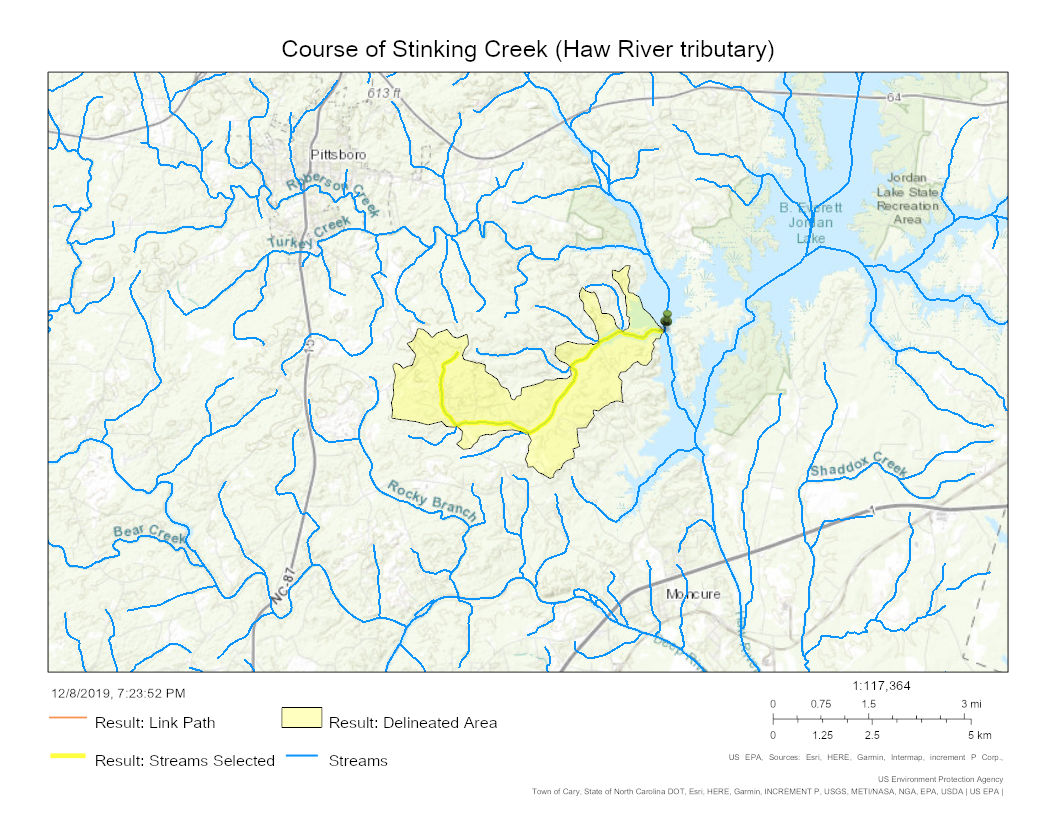
Course of Stinking Creek (Haw River tributary) in Chatham County, North Carolina

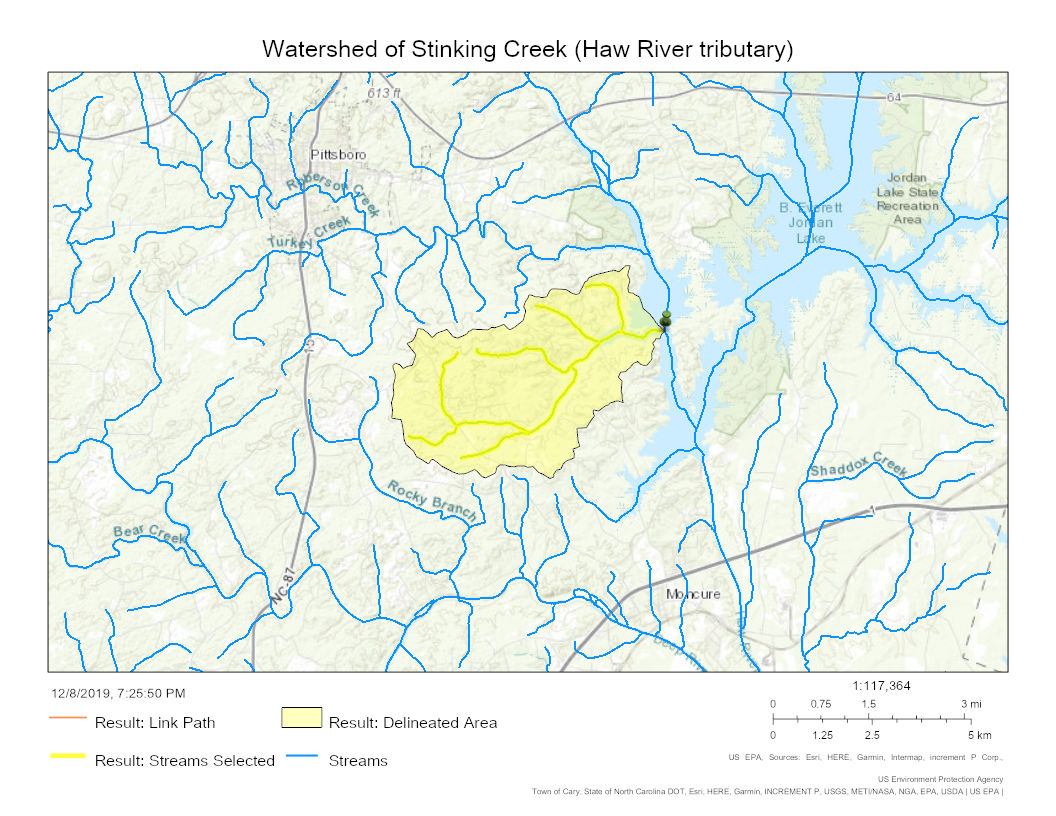
Watershed of Stinking Creek (Haw River tributary) in Chatham County, North Carolina
