= Stony Creek (Haw River tributary) =

Stream in North Carolina, USA

Stony Creek Tributary to Haw River
- Location of Stony Creek mouth Stony Creek (Haw River tributary) (the United States)

Location
- Country: United States
- State: North Carolina
- County: Alamance; Caswell

Physical characteristics
- Source: divide between Stony Creek and Country Line Creek (Dan River)
  - location: Cherry Grove, North Carolina
  - coordinates: 36°18′23″N 079°27′12″W
  - elevation: 730 ft (220 m)
- Mouth: Haw River
  - location: Hopedale, North Carolina
  - coordinates: 36°07′18″N 079°27′12″W
  - elevation: 502 ft (153 m)
- Length: 17.10 mi (27.52 km)
- Basin size: 104.63 square miles (271.0 km^{2})
- Discharge
  - location: Haw River
  - average: 113.63 cu ft/s (3.218 m^{3}/s) at mouth with Haw River

Basin features
- Progression: Haw River → Cape Fear River → Atlantic Ocean
- River system: Haw River
- Tributaries
  - left: Benton Branch; Toms Creek; Deep Creek
  - right: Grays Branch; Buttermilk Creek
- Waterbodies: Lake Burlington; Stony Creek Reservoir
- Bridges: Moore Road, Stadler Road, Kerrs Chapel Road, Sartin Road, Altamahaw Union Ridge Road, Stoney Creek Church Road, Union Ridge Road, NC 62, Deep Creek Church Road

Stony Creek is a 17.10 mi (27.52 km) long 4th order tributary to the Haw River, in Alamance and Caswell Counties, North Carolina.

== Course ==
Stony Creek rises at Cherry Grove, North Carolina in Caswell County on the divide between Stony Creek and Country Line Creek of the Dan River. The creek then flows south into Alamance County and through two impoundments, Lake Burlington and Stony Creek Reservoir, to meet the Haw River at Hopedale, North Carolina.

== Watershed ==
Stony Creek drains 104.63 square miles (271.0 km^{2}) of area, receives about 46.2 in/year of precipitation, and has a wetness index of 423.81 and is about 45% forested.

== See also ==
- List of rivers of North Carolina
