= Motes Creek =

Stream in North Carolina, USA

Motes Creek Tributary to Haw River
- Location of Motes Creek mouth Motes Creek (the United States)

Location
- Country: United States
- State: North Carolina
- County: Alamance

Physical characteristics
- Source: divide between Motes Creek and Cane Creek
  - location: about 4 miles northeast of Saxapahaw, North Carolina
  - coordinates: 35°59′48″N 079°17′13″W
  - elevation: 640 ft (200 m)
- Mouth: Haw River
  - location: Saxapahaw, North Carolina
  - coordinates: 35°56′34″N 079°18′56″W
  - elevation: 413 ft (126 m)
- Length: 5.39 mi (8.67 km)
- Basin size: 5.62 square miles (14.6 km^{2})
- Discharge
  - location: Haw River
  - average: 6.81 cu ft/s (0.193 m^{3}/s) at mouth with Haw River

Basin features
- Progression: Haw River → Cape Fear River → Atlantic Ocean
- River system: Haw River
- Tributaries
  - left: unnamed tributaries
  - right: unnamed tributaries
- Waterbodies: unnamed waterbody
- Bridges: Dodson Lane, NC 54, Salem Church Road, Saxapahaw Salem Church Road

Motes Creek is a 5.39 mi (8.67 km) long 3rd order tributary to the Haw River, in Alamance County, North Carolina.

== Course ==
Motes Creek rises on the divide between it and Cane Creek, about 4 miles northeast of Saxapahaw in Alamance County, North Carolina and then flows east to the Haw River at Saxapahaw, North Carolina.

== Watershed ==
Motes Creek drains 5.62 square miles (14.6 km^{2}) of area, receives about 46.5 in/year of precipitation, and has a wetness index of 423.14 and is about 39% forested.

== See also ==
- List of rivers of North Carolina

== Additional Maps ==
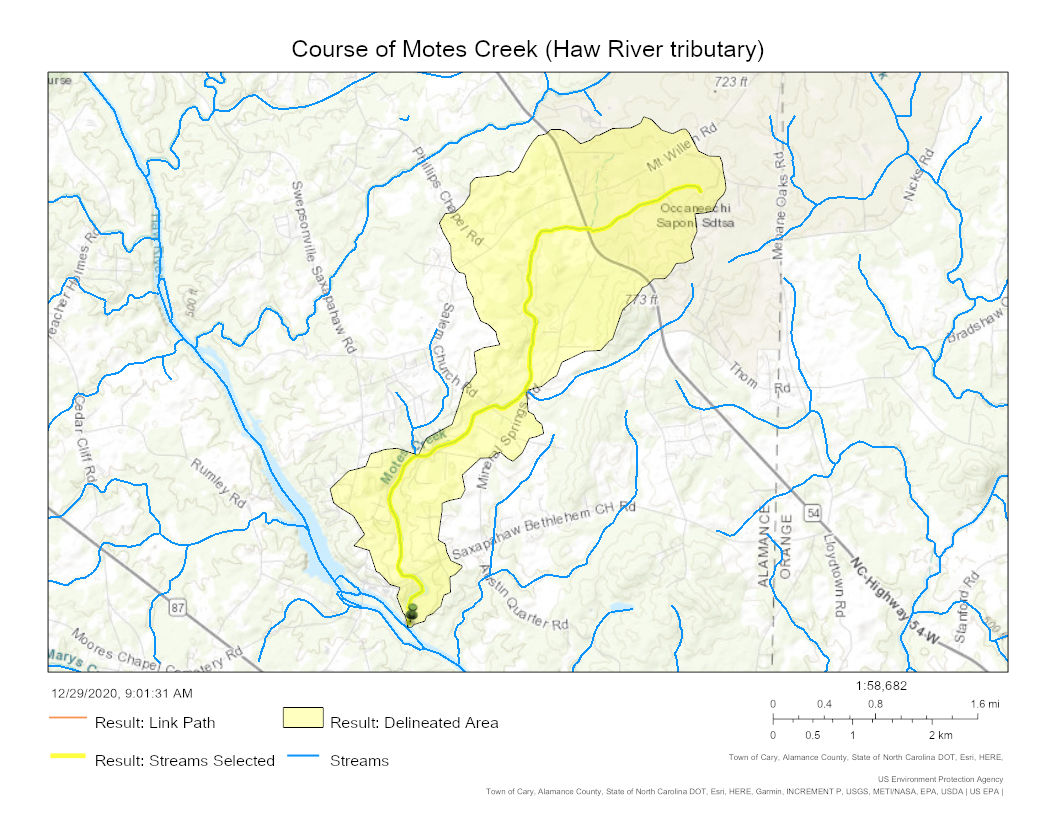
Course of Motes Creek (Haw River tributary) in Alamance County, North Carolina

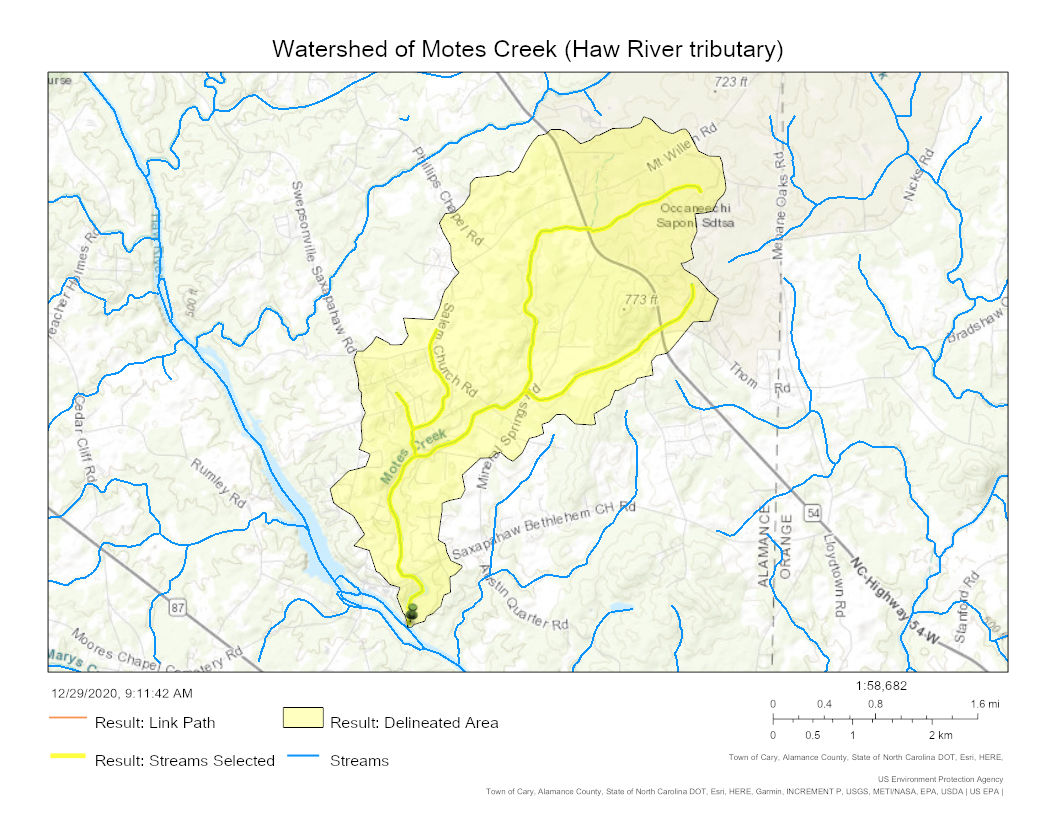
Watershed of Motes Creek (Haw River tributary) in Alamance County, North Carolina
