= Carolina, Alamance County, North Carolina =

Carolina
- Unincorporated community
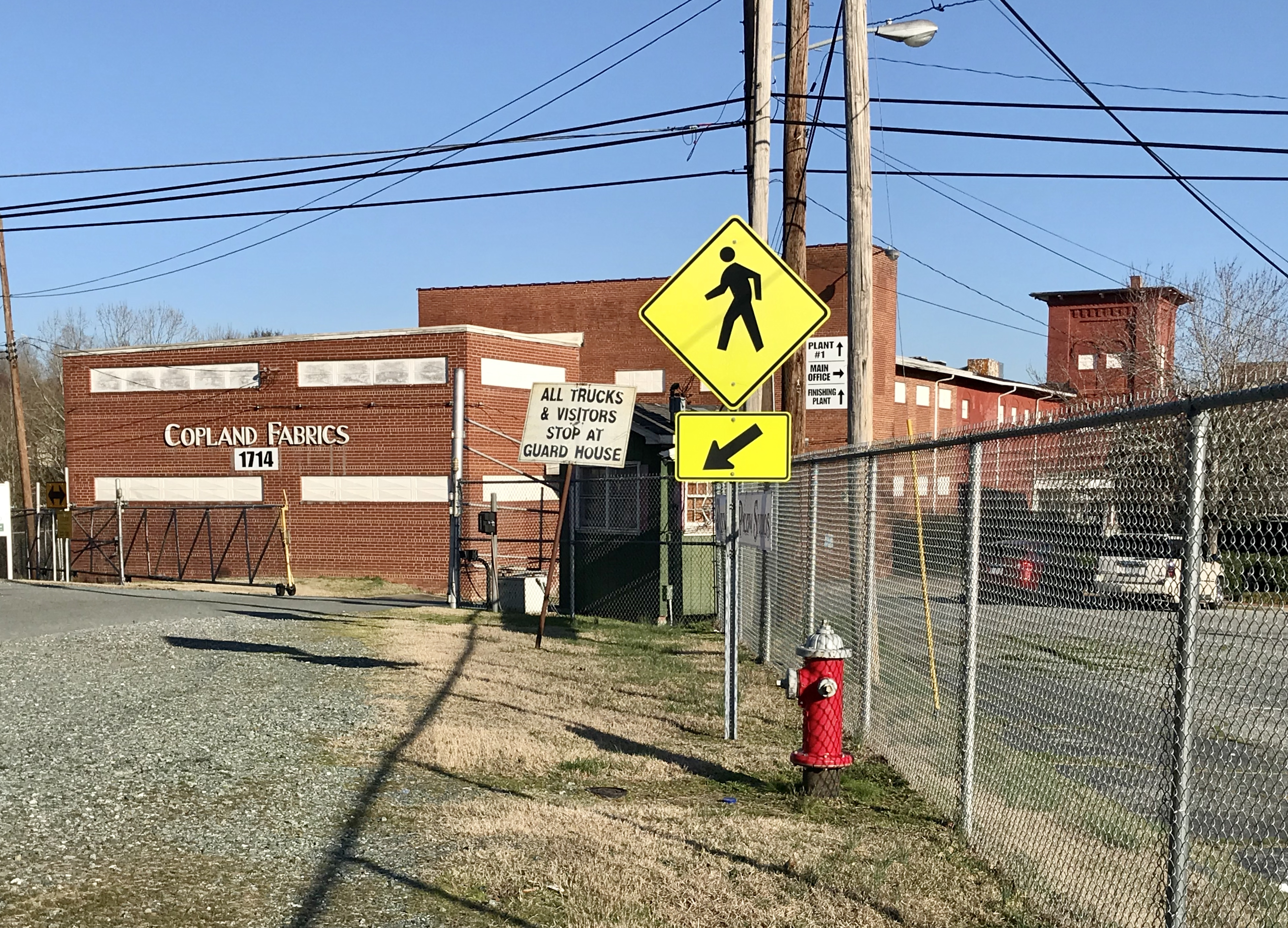
- Former Copland Fabrics mill in Carolina

- Location within the state of North Carolina
- Coordinates: 36°07′54″N 79°24′45″W
- Country: United States
- State: North Carolina
- County: Alamance
- Elevation: 584 ft (178 m)
- Time zone: UTC-5 (Eastern (EST))
  - Summer (DST): UTC-4 (EDT)
- GNIS feature ID: 1019534

Carolina or Hopedale is an unincorporated community located on the Haw River in Alamance County, North Carolina, United States. It is located east-southeast of Glencoe.

In late 2018, Copland Fabrics closed its textile mills in the community, laying off 200 workers.
