= Collins Creek (Haw River tributary) =

Stream in North Carolina, USA

Collins Creek Tributary to Haw River
- Location of Collins Creek mouth Collins Creek (Haw River tributary) (the United States)

Location
- Country: United States
- State: North Carolina
- Counties: Chatham; Orange

Physical characteristics
- Source: divide between Collins Creek and Morgan Creek
  - location: Dodsons Crossroads, North Carolina
  - coordinates: 35°58′19″N 079°10′03″W
  - elevation: 618 ft (188 m)
- Mouth: Haw River
  - location: about 2 miles east of Mandale, North Carolina
  - coordinates: 35°51′00″N 079°14′10″W
  - elevation: 387 ft (118 m)
- Length: 11.73 mi (18.88 km)
- Basin size: 19.58 square miles (50.7 km^{2})
- Discharge
  - location: Haw River
  - average: 23.62 cu ft/s (0.669 m^{3}/s) at mouth with Haw River

Basin features
- Progression: Haw River → Cape Fear River → Atlantic Ocean
- River system: Haw River
- Tributaries
  - left: Wildcat Branch; Persimmon Nursery Branch
  - right: unnamed tributaries
- Bridges: Orange Grove Road, NC 54, Old Greensboro Road, Crawford Dairy Road

Collins Creek is a 11.73 mi (18.88 km) long 3rd order tributary to the Haw River, in Chatham and Orange Counties, North Carolina.

== Course ==
Collins Creek rises at Dodsons Crossroads in Orange County, North Carolina and then flows south into Chatham County to the Haw River about 2 miles east of Mandale, North Carolina.

== Watershed ==
Collins Creek drains 19.58 square miles (50.7 km^{2}) of area, receives about 47.3 in/year of precipitation, and has a wetness index of 437.59 and is about 67% forested.

== See also ==
- List of rivers of North Carolina

== Additional Maps ==
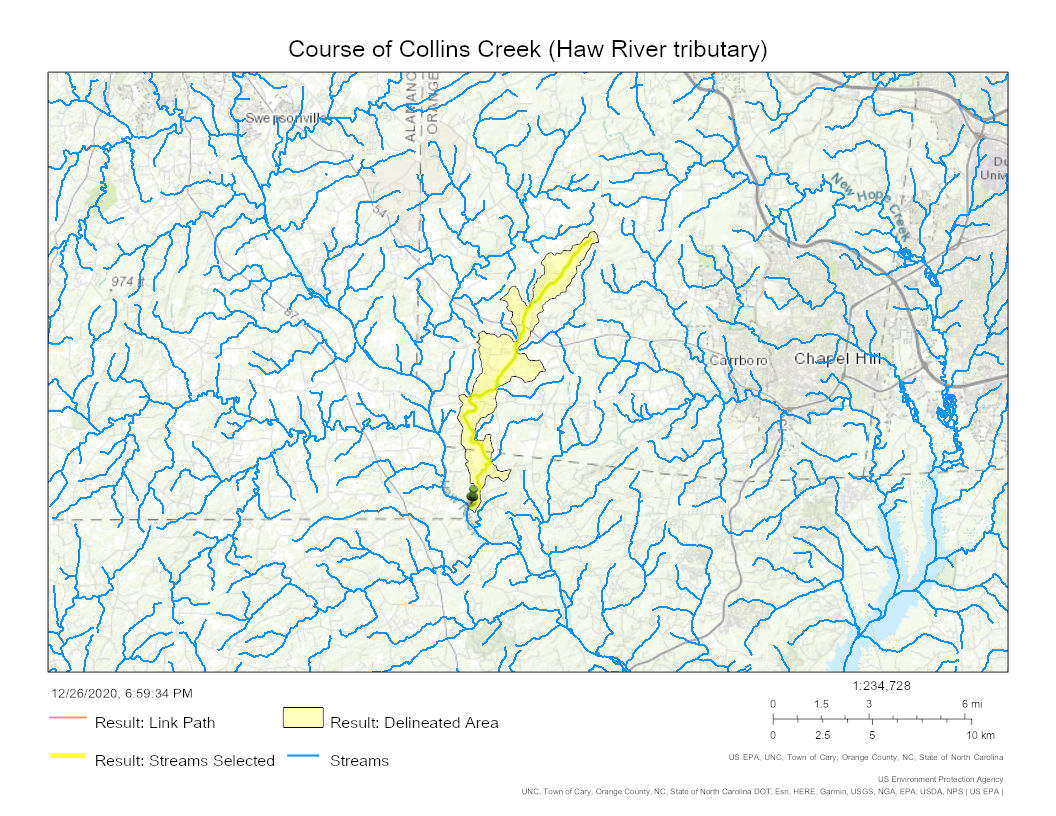
Course of Collins Creek (Haw River tributary) in Chatham and Orange Counties, North Carolina

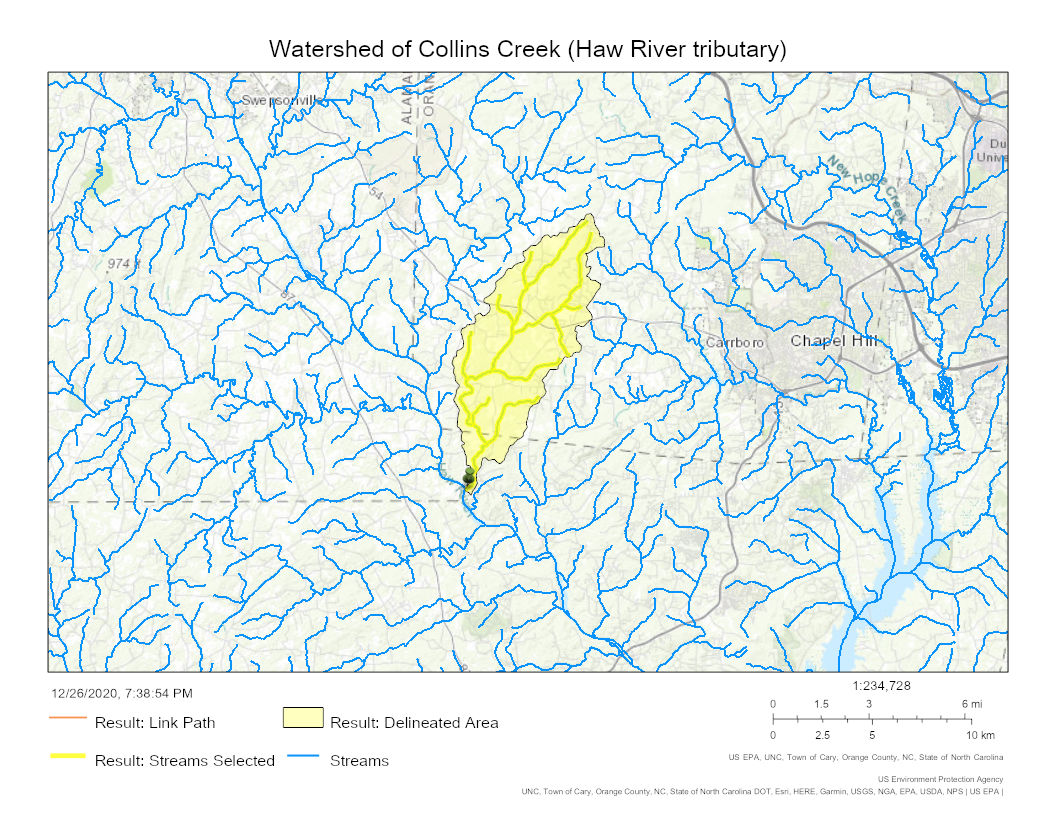
Watershed of Collins Creek (Haw River tributary) in Chatham and Orange Counties, North Carolina
