= Haw Creek (Haw River tributary) =

Stream in North Carolina, USA

Haw Creek Tributary to Haw River
- Location of Haw Creek mouth Haw Creek (Haw River tributary) (the United States)

Location
- Country: United States
- State: North Carolina
- County: Alamance; Orange

Physical characteristics
- Source: divide between Haw Creek and Mill Creek
  - location: Pond about 0.5 miles southeast of Mebane, North Carolina
  - coordinates: 36°04′55″N 079°13′37″W
  - elevation: 690 ft (210 m)
- Mouth: Haw River
  - location: about 3 miles south of Swepsonville, North Carolina
  - coordinates: 35°59′37″N 079°21′06″W
  - elevation: 453 ft (138 m)
- Length: 12.84 mi (20.66 km)
- Basin size: 28.43 square miles (73.6 km^{2})
- Discharge
  - location: Haw River
  - average: 32.14 cu ft/s (0.910 m^{3}/s) at mouth with Haw River

Basin features
- Progression: Haw River → Cape Fear River → Atlantic Ocean
- River system: Haw River
- Tributaries
  - left: unnamed tributaries
  - right: unnamed tributaries
- Bridges: I-85/40, West Ten Road, Bowman Road, Mebane Oaks Road, Jones Road, South Jim Minor Road, NC 54, Wormranch Road, Swepsonville-Saxapahaw Road

Haw Creek is a 12.84 mi (20.66 km) long 3rd order tributary to the Haw River, in Alamance County, North Carolina.

== Variant names ==
According to the Geographic Names Information System, it has also been known historically as:

- Jumping Run

== Course ==
Haw Creek rises in a pond about 0.5 miles southeast of Mebane in Orange County, North Carolina and then flows southwest into Alamance County to the Haw River about 3 miles south of Swepsonville, North Carolina.

== Watershed ==
Haw Creek drains 28.43 square miles (73.6 km^{2}) of area, receives about 46.3 in/year of precipitation, and has a wetness index of 427.99 and is about 49% forested.

== See also ==
- List of rivers of North Carolina
