= Cane Creek (Haw River tributary, right bank) =

Stream in North Carolina, US

Cane Creek Tributary to Haw River
- Location of Cane Creek mouth Cane Creek (Haw River tributary, right bank) (the United States)

Location
- Country: United States
- State: North Carolina
- County: Alamance

Physical characteristics
- Source: divide between Cane Creek and Poppaw Creek
  - location: about 3 miles northwest of Pleasantville, North Carolina
  - coordinates: 35°53′37″N 079°30′44″W
  - elevation: 700 ft (210 m)
- Mouth: Haw River
  - location: about 3 miles southeast of Eli Whitney, North Carolina
  - coordinates: 35°53′01″N 079°15′18″W
  - elevation: 395 ft (120 m)
- Length: 24.21 mi (38.96 km)
- Basin size: 68.06 square miles (176.3 km^{2})
- Discharge
  - location: Haw River
  - average: 77.97 cu ft/s (2.208 m^{3}/s) at mouth with Haw River

Basin features
- Progression: Haw River → Cape Fear River → Atlantic Ocean
- River system: Haw River
- Tributaries
  - left: Wells Creek
  - right: Reedy Branch; South Fork; Pine Branch
- Bridges: Rural View Road, Cobe Mill Road, Pleasant Hill Church Road, Sylvan School Road, Snow Camp Road, Holman Mill Road, Bethel South Fork Road, Lindley Mill Road, NC 87, McBane Mill Road

Cane Creek is a 24.21 mi (38.96 km) long 4th order tributary to the Haw River, in Alamance County, North Carolina. This Cane Creek is located on the right bank of the Haw River.

== Course ==
Cane Creek rises northwest of Pleasantville, North Carolina in Alamance County, North Carolina and then flows east to the Haw River about 3 miles southeast of Eli Whitney.

== Watershed ==
Cane Creek drains 68.06 square miles (176.3 km^{2}) of area, receives about 47.1 in/year of precipitation, and has a wetness index of 419.17 and is about 45% forested.

== See also ==
- Cane Creek (Haw River tributary, left bank)
