= Rock Branch (Haw River tributary) =

Stream in North Carolina, USA

Rock Branch Tributary to Haw River
- Location of Rock Branch mouth Rock Branch (Haw River tributary) (the United States)

Location
- Country: United States
- State: North Carolina
- County: Guilford

Physical characteristics
- Source: divide between Rock Branch and Kings Creek
  - location: pond a Kings Crossroads, North Carolina
  - coordinates: 36°12′51″N 079°59′14″W
  - elevation: 925 ft (282 m)
- Mouth: Haw River
  - location: about 1.5 miles east of Kings Crossroads, North Carolina
  - coordinates: 36°12′43″N 079°57′35″W
  - elevation: 778 ft (237 m)
- Length: 2.00 mi (3.22 km)
- Basin size: 2.40 square miles (6.2 km^{2})
- Discharge
  - location: Haw River
  - average: 3.03 cu ft/s (0.086 m^{3}/s) at mouth with Haw River

Basin features
- Progression: Haw River → Cape Fear River → Atlantic Ocean
- River system: Haw River
- Tributaries
  - left: unnamed tributaries
  - right: unnamed tributaries

Rock Branch is a 2.00 mi (3.22 km) long 1st order tributary to the Haw River, in Guilford County, North Carolina.

== Course ==
Rock Branch rises in a pond on the divide between Rock Branch and Kings Creek at Kings Crossroads, North Carolina in Guilford County. Rock Branch then flows southeast meet the Haw River about 1.5 miles east of Kings Crossroads.

== Watershed ==
Rock Branch drains 2.40 square miles (6.2 km^{2}) of area, receives about 45.9 in/year of precipitation, has a topographic wetness index of 405.25 and is about 37% forested.

== Natural history ==
The Natural Areas Inventory Guilford County, North Carolina and a later addition in 1995 recognized one location of natural significance in the Rock Branch watershed. The Rock Branch site contains a mature Mesic Mixed Hardwood Forest.

== See also ==
- List of rivers of North Carolina
