= Big Branch (Haw River tributary) =

Stream in North Carolina, USA

Big Branch Tributary to Haw River
- Location of Big Branch mouth Big Branch (Haw River tributary) (the United States)

Location
- Country: United States
- State: North Carolina
- County: Alamance

Physical characteristics
- Source: divide between Big Branch and Lick Creek
  - location: about 2 miles west-northwest of Mandale, North Carolina
  - coordinates: 35°51′26″N 079°17′09″W
  - elevation: 550 ft (170 m)
- Mouth: Haw River
  - location: about 1.5 miles northeast of Mandale, North Carolina
  - coordinates: 35°51′49″N 079°14′59″W
  - elevation: 390 ft (120 m)
- Length: 2.78 mi (4.47 km)
- Basin size: 3.10 square miles (8.0 km^{2})
- Discharge
  - location: Haw River
  - average: 3.97 cu ft/s (0.112 m^{3}/s) at mouth with Haw River

Basin features
- Progression: Haw River → Cape Fear River → Atlantic Ocean
- River system: Haw River
- Tributaries
  - left: unnamed tributaries
  - right: unnamed tributaries
- Bridges: NC 87, Mandale Road, Perry Road

Big Branch is a 2.78 mi (4.47 km) long 2nd order tributary to the Haw River, in Alamance County, North Carolina.

== Course ==
Big Branch rises west-northwest of Mandale in Alamance County, North Carolina and then flows east to the Haw River about 1.5 miles northeast of Mandale.

== Watershed ==
Big Branch drains 3.10 square miles (8.0 km^{2}) of area, receives about 47.1 in/year of precipitation, and has a wetness index of 426.73 and is about 47% forested.

== See also ==
- List of rivers of North Carolina
