= Travis Creek (Haw River tributary) =

Stream in North Carolina, USA

Travis Creek Tributary to Haw River
- Location of Travis Creek mouth Travis Creek (Haw River tributary) (the United States)

Location
- Country: United States
- State: North Carolina
- County: Alamance; Guilford

Physical characteristics
- Source: divide between Travis Creek and Buffalo Creek
  - location: about 3 miles northwest of Gibsonville, North Carolina
  - coordinates: 36°07′56″N 079°34′49″W
  - elevation: 720 ft (220 m)
- Mouth: Haw River
  - location: about 3 miles north of Glen Raven, North Carolina
  - coordinates: 36°08′33″N 079°29′12″W
  - elevation: 558 ft (170 m)
- Length: 6.54 mi (10.53 km)
- Basin size: 15.70 square miles (40.7 km^{2})
- Discharge
  - location: Haw River
  - average: 17.76 cu ft/s (0.503 m^{3}/s) at mouth with Haw River

Basin features
- Progression: Haw River → Cape Fear River → Atlantic Ocean
- River system: Haw River
- Tributaries
  - left: Tickle Creek
  - right: unnamed tributaries
- Bridges: Wagoner Road, Friedan Church Road, County Farm Road, Gibsonville-Ossipee Road, Elon-Ossipee Road, Phibbs Road, NC 87, Durham Street

Travis Creek is a 6.54 mi (10.53 km) long 3rd order tributary to the Haw River, in Alamance County, North Carolina.

== Course ==
Travis Creek rises in Guilford County on the divide between Travis Creek and Buffalo Creek. Travis Creek then flows east into Alamance County to meet the Haw River about 3 miles north of Glen Raven, North Carolina.

== Watershed ==
Travis Creek drains 15.70 square miles (40.7 km^{2}) of area, receives about 46.0 in/year of precipitation, and has a wetness index of 443.11 and is about 36% forested.

== See also ==
- List of rivers of North Carolina
