= Brooks Creek (Haw River tributary) =

Stream in North Carolina, USA

Brooks Creek Tributary to Haw River
- Location of Brooks Creek mouth Brooks Creek (Haw River tributary) (the United States)

Location
- Country: United States
- State: North Carolina
- County: Chatham

Physical characteristics
- Source: divide between Brooks Creek and Dry Creek
  - location: pond about 1.5 miles north of Gum Springs, North Carolina
  - coordinates: 35°46′29″N 079°09′00″W
  - elevation: 505 ft (154 m)
- Mouth: Haw River
  - location: Bynum, North Carolina
  - coordinates: 35°46′37″N 079°14′32″W
  - elevation: 305 ft (93 m)
- Length: 6.79 mi (10.93 km)
- Basin size: 9.90 square miles (25.6 km^{2})
- Discharge
  - location: Haw River
  - average: 12.09 cu ft/s (0.342 m^{3}/s) at mouth with Haw River

Basin features
- Progression: Haw River → Cape Fear River → Atlantic Ocean
- River system: Haw River
- Tributaries
  - left: unnamed tributaries
  - right: unnamed tributaries
- Bridges: NC 87, Old Graham Road, Bent Tree, Eddie Perry Road

Brooks Creek is a 6.79 mi (10.93 km) long 3rd order tributary to the Haw River in Chatham County, North Carolina.

== Course ==
Brooks Creek rises about 1.5 miles north of Gum Springs, North Carolina in Chatham County and then flows east to the Haw River across from Bynum.

== Watershed ==
Brooks Creek drains 9.90 square miles (25.6 km^{2}) of area, receives about 47.4 in/year of precipitation, and has a wetness index of 424.50 and is about 74% forested.

== See also ==
- List of rivers of North Carolina

== Additional maps ==
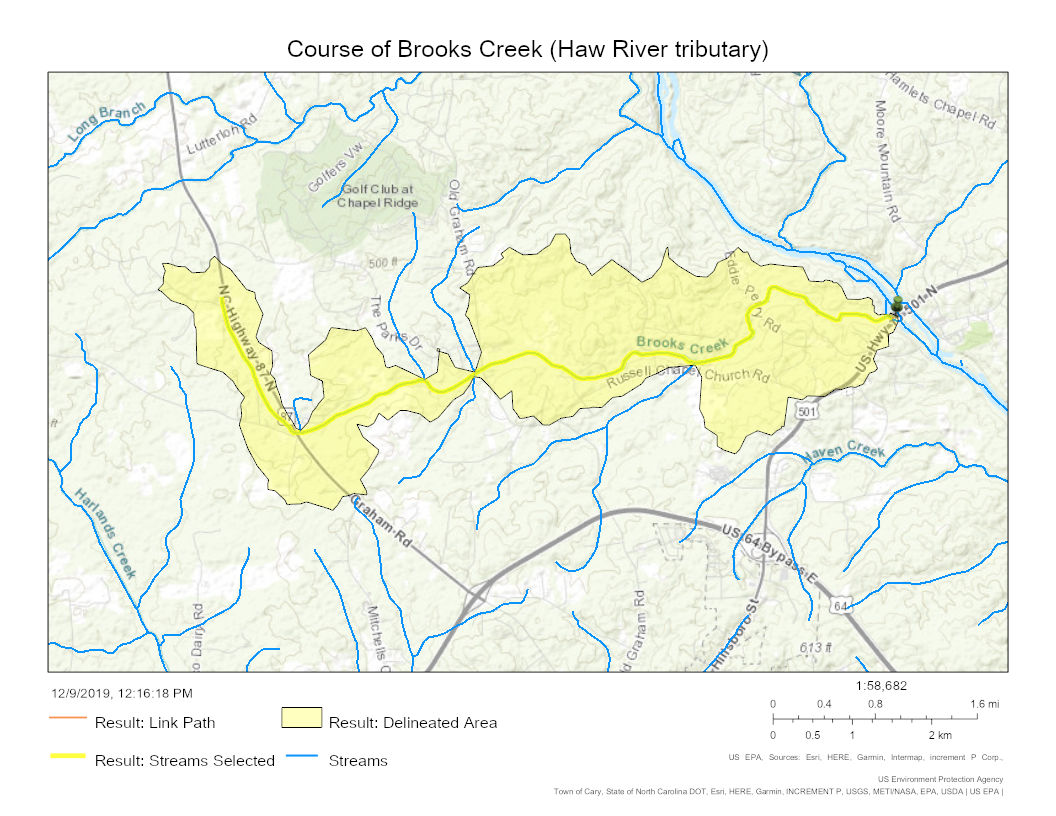
Course of Brooks Creek (Haw River tributary) in Chatham County, North Carolina

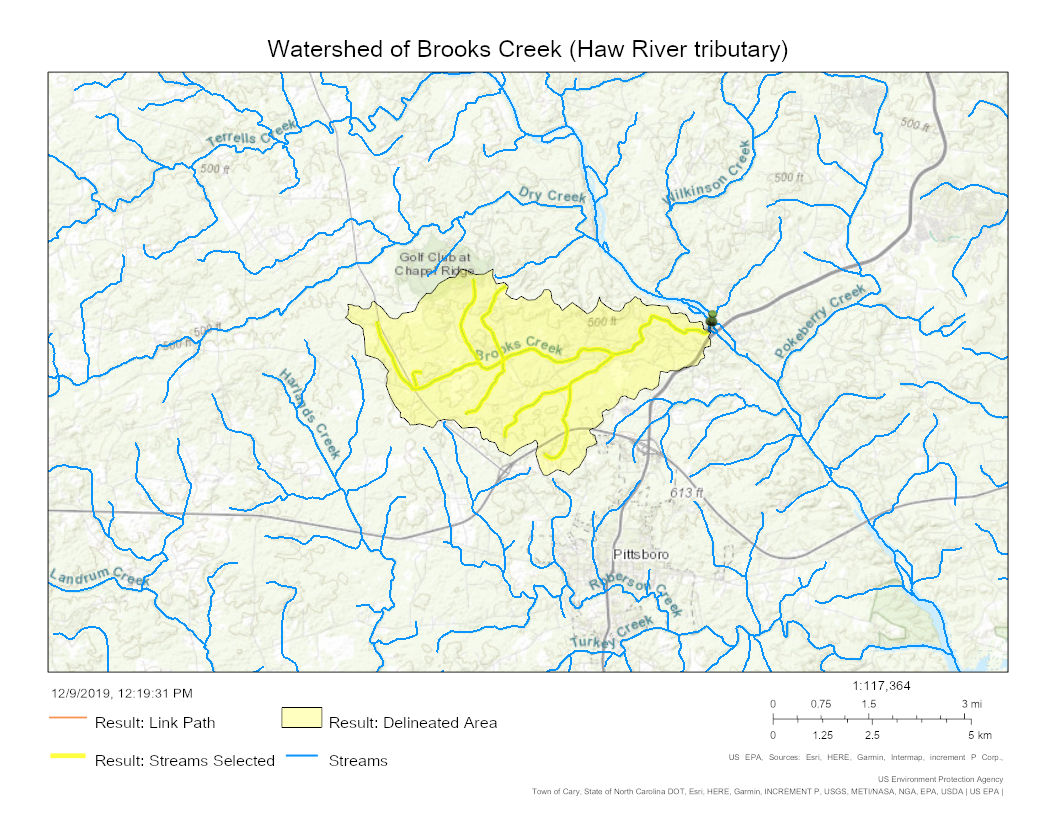
Watershed of Brooks Creek (Haw River tributary) in Chatham County, North Carolina
