= Giles Creek (Haw River tributary) =

Stream in North Carolina, USA

Giles Creek Tributary to Haw River
- Location of Giles Creek mouth Giles Creek (Haw River tributary) (the United States)

Location
- Country: United States
- State: North Carolina
- County: Rockingham

Physical characteristics
- Source: divide between Giles Creek and Country Line Creek (Dan River)
  - location: pond about 3 miles east of Williamsburg, North Carolina
  - coordinates: 36°17′08″N 079°33′27″W
  - elevation: 760 ft (230 m)
- Mouth: Haw River
  - location: about 2 miles south of Williamsburg, North Carolina
  - coordinates: 36°15′49″N 079°34′59″W
  - elevation: 636 ft (194 m)
- Length: 2.08 mi (3.35 km)
- Basin size: 2.88 square miles (7.5 km^{2})
- Discharge
  - location: Haw River
  - average: 3.69 cu ft/s (0.104 m^{3}/s) at mouth with Haw River

Basin features
- Progression: Haw River → Cape Fear River → Atlantic Ocean
- River system: Haw River
- Tributaries
  - left: unnamed tributaries
  - right: unnamed tributaries
- Bridges: NC 87, Gilliam Road

Giles Creek is a 2.08 mi (3.35 km) long 1st order tributary to the Haw River, in Rockingham County, North Carolina.

== Course ==
Giles Creek rises in Rockingham County, North Carolina on the divide between Giles Creek and Country Line Creek. Giles Creek then flows southwest to meet the Haw River about 2 miles south of Williamsburg, North Carolina.

== Watershed ==
Giles Creek drains 2.88 square miles (7.5 km^{2}) of area, receives about 46.3 in/year of precipitation, has a topographic wetness index of 432.03 and is about 37% forested.

== See also ==
- List of rivers of North Carolina
