= Little Troublesome Creek (Haw River tributary) =

Stream in North Carolina, USA

Little Troublesome Creek Tributary to Haw River
- Location of Little Troublesome Creek mouth Little Troublesome Creek (Haw River tributary) (the United States)

Location
- Country: United States
- State: North Carolina
- County: Rockingham
- City: Reidsville

Physical characteristics
- Source: divide between Little Troublesome Creek and Troublesome Creek
  - location: pond in Reidsville, North Carolina
  - coordinates: 36°20′54″N 079°41′49″W
  - elevation: 810 ft (250 m)
- Mouth: Haw River
  - location: about 1 mile southwest of Williamsburg, North Carolina
  - coordinates: 36°16′11″N 079°36′29″W
  - elevation: 650 ft (200 m)
- Length: 8.26 mi (13.29 km)
- Basin size: 13.00 square miles (33.7 km^{2})
- Discharge
  - location: Haw River
  - average: 16.37 cu ft/s (0.464 m^{3}/s) at mouth with Haw River

Basin features
- Progression: Haw River → Cape Fear River → Atlantic Ocean
- River system: Haw River
- Tributaries
  - left: unnamed tributaries
  - right: unnamed tributaries
- Bridges: Freeway Drive (NC 87/US 158), Sherwood Drive, Richardson Drive, S. Park Drive, S. Scales Street, Freeway Drive (NC 87), US 29, Cook Florist Road, Mizpah Church Road

Little Troublesome Creek is a 8.26 mi (13.29 km) long 2nd order tributary to the Haw River, in Rockingham County, North Carolina.

== Course ==
Little Troublesome Creek rises in a pond located in Reidsville, North Carolina on the divide between Little Troublesome Creek and Troublesome Creek. Little Troublesome Creek then flows southeast to meet the Haw River about 1 mile southwest of Williamsburg, North Carolina.

== Watershed ==
Little Troublesome Creek drains 13.00 square miles (33.7 km^{2}) of area, receives about 46.7 in/year of precipitation, has a topographic wetness index of 422.04 and is about 33% forested.

== See also ==
- List of rivers of North Carolina
