= Back Creek (Haw River tributary) =

Stream in North Carolina, USA

Back Creek Tributary to Haw River
- Location of Back Creek mouth Back Creek (Haw River tributary) (the United States)

Location
- Country: United States
- State: North Carolina
- County: Alamance; Orange
- City: Graham

Physical characteristics
- Source: divide between Back Creek and Lynch Creek
  - location: pond about 0.5 miles northeast of Carr, North Carolina
  - coordinates: 36°07′31″N 079°18′02″W
  - elevation: 720 ft (220 m)
- Mouth: Haw River
  - location: about 1.5 miles southeast of Graham, North Carolina
  - coordinates: 36°02′44″N 079°22′04″W
  - elevation: 476 ft (145 m)
- Length: 8.77 mi (14.11 km)
- Basin size: 81.21 square miles (210.3 km^{2})
- Discharge
  - location: Haw River
  - average: 88.66 cu ft/s (2.511 m^{3}/s) at mouth with Haw River

Basin features
- Progression: Haw River → Cape Fear River → Atlantic Ocean
- River system: Haw River
- Tributaries
  - left: Mill Creek
  - right: Stagg Creek; Quaker Creek
- Waterbodies: Quaker Creek Reservoir

Back Creek is a 8.77 mi (14.11 km) long 4th order tributary to the Haw River, in Alamance County, North Carolina.

== Variant names ==
According to the Geographic Names Information System, it has also been known historically as:

- Buffalo Creek

== Course ==
Back Creek rises in a pond about 0.5 miles northeast of Carr in Orange County, North Carolina and then flows southwest to the Haw River about 1.5 miles southeast of Graham, North Carolina.

== Watershed ==
Back Creek drains 81.21 square miles (210.3 km^{2}) of area, receives about 46.3 in/year of precipitation, and has a wetness index of 430.93 and is about 44% forested.

== See also ==
- List of rivers of North Carolina
