= Pokeberry Creek (Haw River tributary) =

Stream in North Carolina, USA

Pokeberry Creek Tributary to Haw River
- Location of Pokeberry Creek mouth Pokeberry Creek (Haw River tributary) (the United States)

Location
- Country: United States
- State: North Carolina
- County: Chatham

Physical characteristics
- Source: divide between Pokeberry Creek and Morgan Creek
  - location: about 5 miles southwest of Chapel Hill, North Carolina
  - coordinates: 35°50′28″N 079°07′26″W
  - elevation: 552 ft (168 m)
- Mouth: Haw River
  - location: about 1 mile southeast of Bynum, North Carolina
  - coordinates: 35°45′48″N 079°07′52″W
  - elevation: 290 ft (88 m)
- Length: 7.82 mi (12.59 km)
- Basin size: 12.81 square miles (33.2 km^{2})
- Discharge
  - location: Haw River
  - average: 15.62 cu ft/s (0.442 m^{3}/s) at mouth with Haw River

Basin features
- Progression: Haw River → Cape Fear River → Atlantic Ocean
- River system: Haw River
- Tributaries
  - left: Ward Branch
  - right: unnamed tributaries
- Bridges: Great Ridge Parkway, Catulio Run, Andrews Store Road, Morris Road, US 15, Bynum Ridge Road

Pokeberry Creek is a 7.82 mi (12.59 km) long 3rd order tributary to the Haw River in Chatham County, North Carolina. This creek is one of two streams in the United States named Pokeberry Creek. The other is in Warrick County, Indiana.

== Course ==
Pokeberry Creek rises about 5 miles southwest of Chapel Hill, North Carolina in Chatham County and then flows southwest to the Haw River just downstream of Bynum.

== Watershed ==
Pokeberry Creek drains 12.81 square miles (33.2 km^{2}) of area, receives about 47.4 in/year of precipitation, and has a wetness index of 395.85 and is about 71% forested.

== See also ==
- List of rivers of North Carolina

== Additional images ==
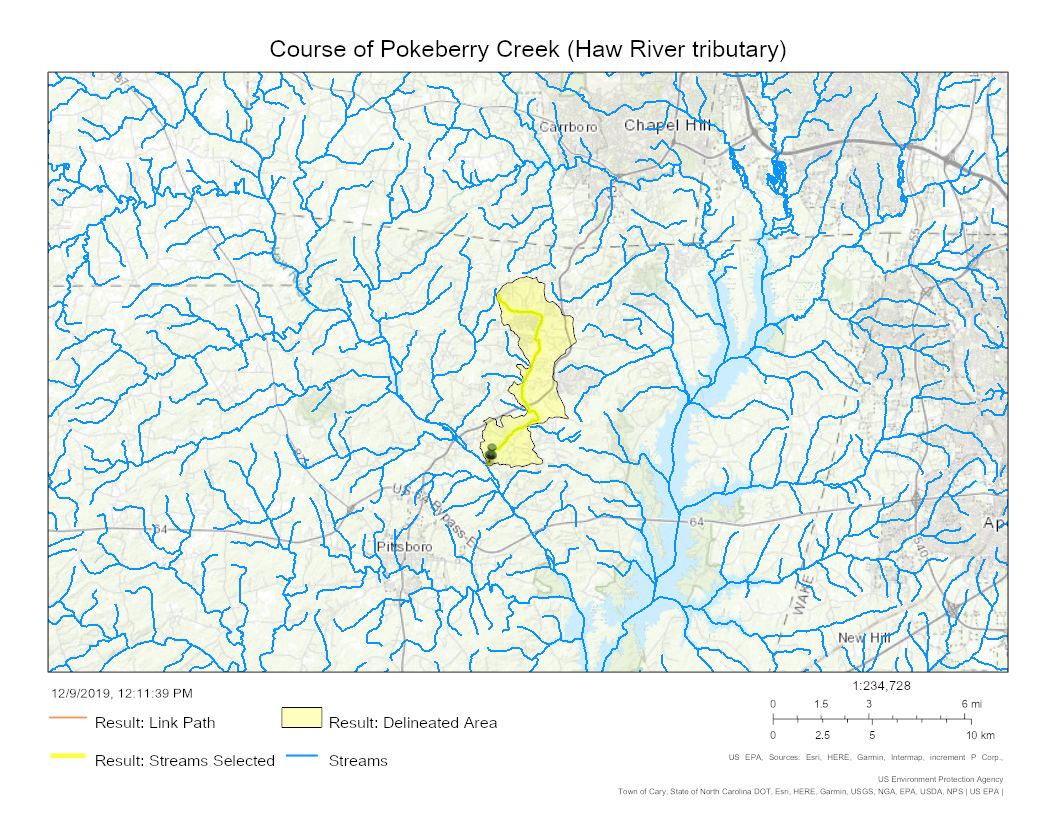
Course of Pokeberry Creek (Haw River tributary) in Chatham County, North Carolina

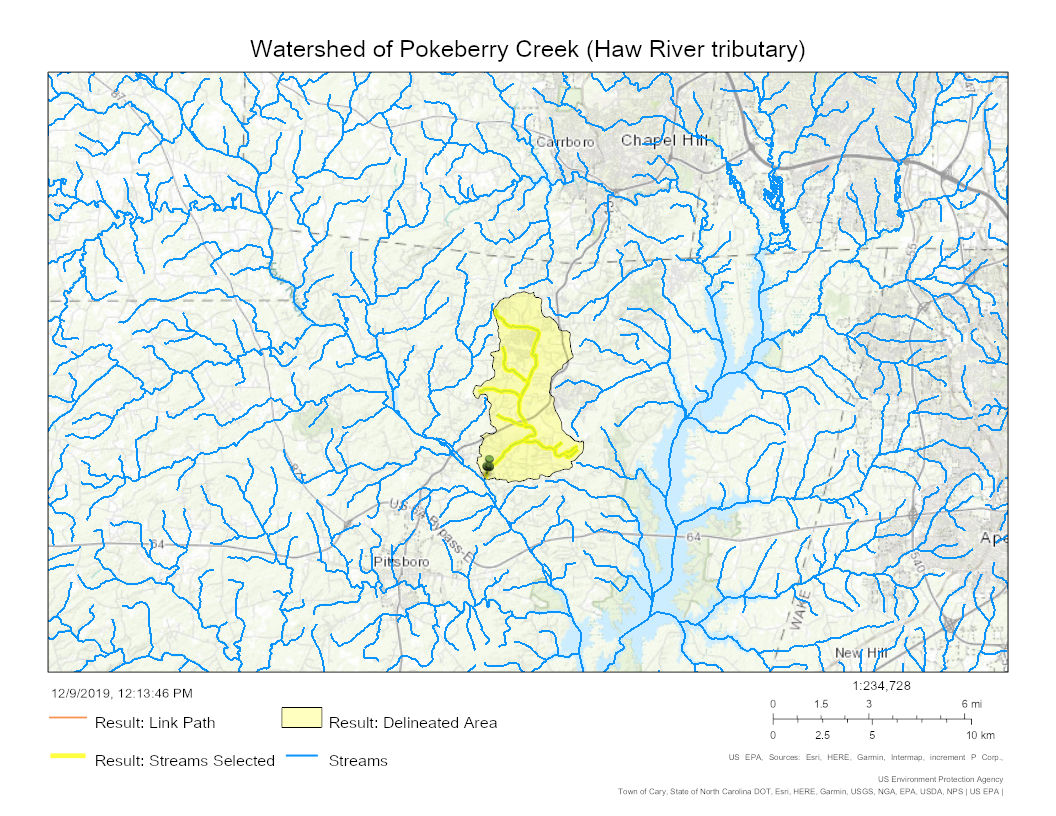
Watershed of Pokeberry Creek (Haw River tributary) in Chatham County, North Carolina
