= Shaddox Creek =

Stream in North Carolina, USA

Shaddox Creek Tributary to Haw River
- Location of Shaddox Creek mouth Shaddox Creek (the United States)

Location
- Country: United States
- State: North Carolina
- County: Chatham

Physical characteristics
- Source: divide between Shaddox Creek and Buckhorn Creek
  - location: pond about 1 mile northeast of Merry Oaks, North Carolina
  - coordinates: 35°39′07″N 078°59′32″W
  - elevation: 295 ft (90 m)
- Mouth: Haw River
  - location: about 2 miles southeast of Moncure, North Carolina
  - coordinates: 35°35′57″N 079°02′59″W
  - elevation: 164 ft (50 m)
- Length: 3.83 mi (6.16 km)
- Basin size: 15.21 square miles (39.4 km^{2})
- Discharge
  - location: Haw River
  - average: 17.72 cu ft/s (0.502 m^{3}/s) at mouth with Haw River

Basin features
- Progression: Haw River → Cape Fear River → Atlantic Ocean
- River system: Haw River
- Tributaries
  - left: unnamed tributaries
  - right: unnamed tributaries
- Bridges: Jordan Estates Lane, New Elam Church Road, US 1, Old US 1, Corinth Road

Shaddox Creek is a 3.83-mile-long (6.16 km) 3rd order tributary to the Haw River in Chatham County, North Carolina. Shaddox Creek is the only stream of this name in the United States.

== Course ==
Shaddox Creek rises in a pond about 1 mile northeast of Merry Oaks, North Carolina in Chatham County and then flows west then south to the Haw River about 2 miles southeast of Moncure, North Carolina. Shaddox Creek is the last tributary to the Haw River before it joins the Deep River to form the Cape Fear River.

== Watershed ==
Shaddox Creek drains 45.98 square miles (119.1 km^{2}) of area, receives about 47.5 in/year of precipitation, and has a topographic wetness index of 451.04 and is about 68% forested.

== See also ==
- List of rivers of North Carolina

== Additional maps ==
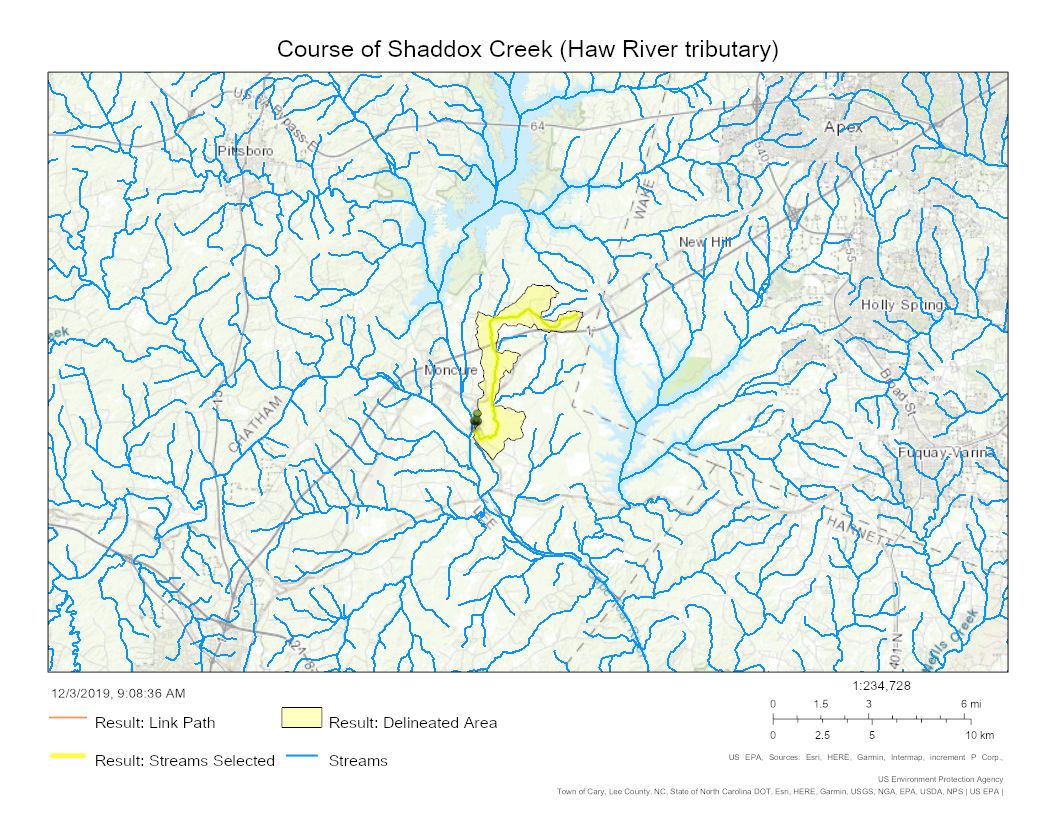
Course of Shaddox Creek (Haw River tributary)

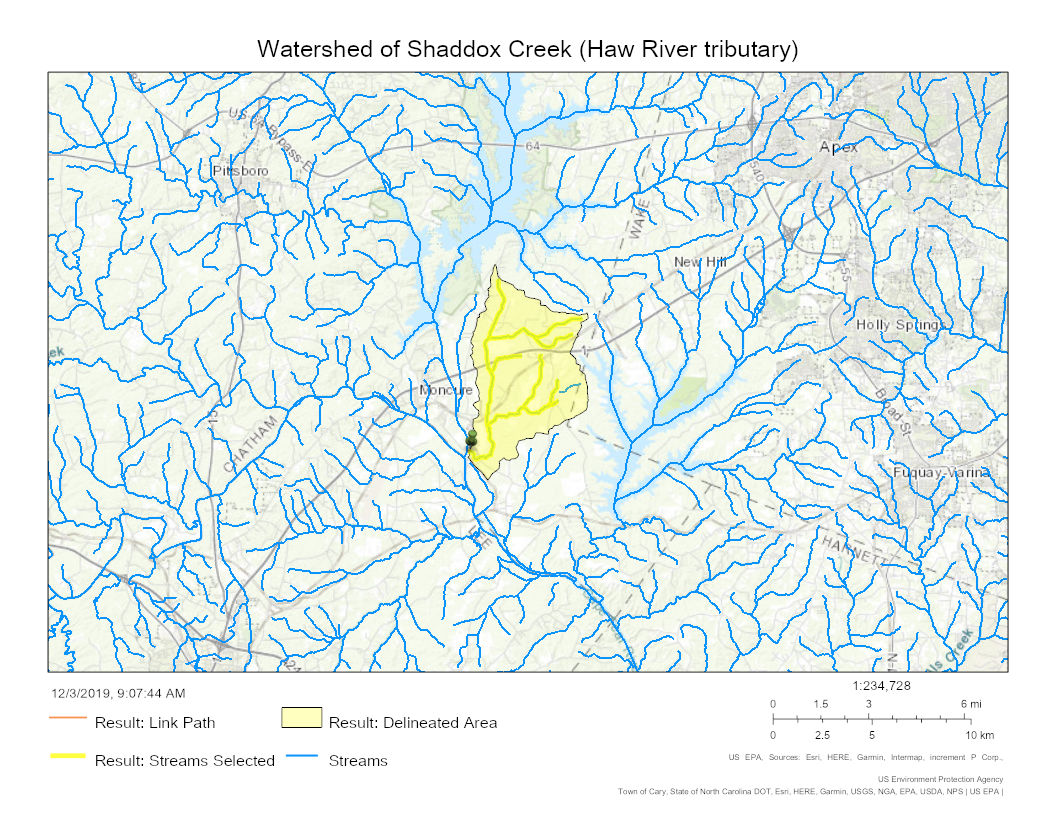
Watershed of Shaddox Creek (Haw River tributary)
