= Boyds Creek (Haw River tributary) =

Stream in North Carolina, USA

Boyds Creek Tributary to Haw River
- Location of Boyds Creek mouth Boyds Creek (Haw River tributary) (the United States)

Location
- Country: United States
- State: North Carolina
- County: Alamance

Physical characteristics
- Source: divide between Boyds Creek and Deep Creek
  - location: Pond about 3 miles southeast of McCray, North Carolina
  - coordinates: 36°09′16″N 079°20′30″W
  - elevation: 700 ft (210 m)
- Mouth: Haw River
  - location: about 1 mile northwest of Haw River, North Carolina
  - coordinates: 36°06′08″N 079°22′51″W
  - elevation: 492 ft (150 m)
- Length: 4.54 mi (7.31 km)
- Basin size: 7.38 square miles (19.1 km^{2})
- Discharge
  - location: Haw River
  - average: 8.53 cu ft/s (0.242 m^{3}/s) at mouth with Haw River

Basin features
- Progression: Haw River → Cape Fear River → Atlantic Ocean
- River system: Haw River
- Tributaries
  - left: unnamed tributaries
  - right: unnamed tributaries
- Bridges: Sandy Cross Road, Luck Stone Road, Haw River-Hopedale Road

Boyds Creek is a 4.54 mi (7.31 km) long 2nd order tributary to the Haw River, in Alamance County, North Carolina.

== Course ==
Boyds Creek rises in a pond about 3 miles southeast of McCray in Alamance County, North Carolina and then flows southwest to the Haw River about 1 mile northwest of Haw River, North Carolina.

== Watershed ==
Boyds Creek drains 7.38 square miles (19.1 km^{2}) of area, receives about 46.0 in/year of precipitation, and has a wetness index of 416.84 and is about 41% forested.
