= Service Creek (Haw River tributary) =

Stream in North Carolina, USA

Service Creek Tributary to Haw River
- Location of Service Creek mouth Service Creek (Haw River tributary) (the United States)

Location
- Country: United States
- State: North Carolina
- County: Alamance

Physical characteristics
- Source: divide between Service Creek and Little Alamance Creek
  - location: pond at Glen Raven, North Carolina
  - coordinates: 36°06′51″N 079°28′15″W
  - elevation: 690 ft (210 m)
- Mouth: Haw River
  - location: about 0.25 miles east of Burlington, North Carolina
  - coordinates: 36°06′32″N 079°23′35″W
  - elevation: 499 ft (152 m)
- Length: 5.93 mi (9.54 km)
- Basin size: 8.01 square miles (20.7 km^{2})
- Discharge
  - location: Haw River
  - average: 9.10 cu ft/s (0.258 m^{3}/s) at mouth with Haw River

Basin features
- Progression: Haw River → Cape Fear River → Atlantic Ocean
- River system: Haw River
- Tributaries
  - left: unnamed tributaries
  - right: Staley Creek
- Bridges: Durham Street, Burch Bridge Road, Lakeside Avenue Ext, Glencoe Road, Lower Hopedale Road, Apple Street, North Graham-Hopedale Road, Squaw Valley Trail

Service Creek is a 5.93 mi (9.54 km) long 2nd order tributary to the Haw River, in Alamance County, North Carolina.

== Course ==
Service Creek rises in a pond at Glen Raven in Alamance County and then flows northeast and makes a turn southeast to the Haw River about 0.25 miles east of Burlington, North Carolina.

== Watershed ==
Service Creek drains 8.01 square miles (20.7 km^{2}) of area, receives about 45.8 in/year of precipitation, and has a wetness index of 432.18 and is about 13% forested.

== See also ==
- List of rivers of North Carolina
