= Varnals Creek =

Stream in North Carolina, USA

Varnals Creek Tributary to Haw River
- Location of Varnals Creek mouth Varnals Creek (the United States)

Location
- Country: United States
- State: North Carolina
- County: Alamance

Physical characteristics
- Source: divide between Varnals Creek and Rock Creek
  - location: about 2 miles southeast of Rock Creek, North Carolina
  - coordinates: 35°56′57″N 079°21′04″W
  - elevation: 630 ft (190 m)
- Mouth: Haw River
  - location: about 4 miles south of Swepsonville, North Carolina
  - coordinates: 35°59′10″N 079°21′04″W
  - elevation: 449 ft (137 m)
- Length: 7.13 mi (11.47 km)
- Basin size: 11.83 square miles (30.6 km^{2})
- Discharge
  - location: Haw River
  - average: 13.62 cu ft/s (0.386 m^{3}/s) at mouth with Haw River

Basin features
- Progression: Haw River → Cape Fear River → Atlantic Ocean
- River system: Haw River
- Tributaries
  - left: unnamed tributaries
  - right: unnamed tributaries
- Bridges: Walt Store Lane, Bass Mountain Road, Thompson Mill Road, NC 87, Preacher Holmes Road

Varnals Creek is a 7.13 mi (11.47 km) long 3rd order tributary to the Haw River, in Alamance County, North Carolina.

== Course ==
Varnals Creek rises in a pond about 2 miles southeast of Rock Creek in Alamance County, North Carolina and then flows northeast to the Haw River about 4 miles south of Swepsonville, North Carolina.

== Watershed ==
Varnals Creek drains 11.83 square miles (30.6 km^{2}) of area, receives about 46.2 in/year of precipitation, and has a wetness index of 413.35 and is about 50% forested.

== See also ==
- List of rivers of North Carolina
