= Ossipee, North Carolina =

- Town
- Seal

- Location within the state of North Carolina
- Coordinates: 36°10′05″N 79°30′49″W
- Country: United States
- State: North Carolina
- County: Alamance
- Incorporated: December 9, 2002

Government
  - Mayor: Ernest (Smokey) Bare

Area
  - Total: 0.62 sq mi (1.61 km^{2})
  - Land: 0.61 sq mi (1.57 km^{2})
  - Water: 0.015 sq mi (0.04 km^{2})
- Elevation: 656 ft (200 m)

Population (2020)
  - Total: 536
  - Density: 883.3/sq mi (341.06/km^{2})
- Time zone: UTC-5 (Eastern Time Zone)
  - Summer (DST): UTC-4 (EDT)
- ZIP codes: 27244
- FIPS code: 37-49600
- GNIS feature ID: 2407057
- Website: townofossipeenc.com

Ossipee is an incorporated town in northwestern Alamance County in the U.S. state of North Carolina. Ossipee is one of the newer municipalities in the state, as it was incorporated officially on December 9, 2002. It was part of the Altamahaw-Ossipee census-designated place until its incorporation. The town had a 2020 population of 536.

The town belongs to the Piedmont Triad metropolitan area.

== Demographics ==
Historical population
Census	Pop.	Note	%±
2010	543		—
2020	536		−1.3%
U.S. Decennial Census
