= Rose Creek (Haw River tributary) =

Stream in North Carolina, USA

Rose Creek Tributary to Haw River
- Location of Rose Creek mouth Rose Creek (Haw River tributary) (the United States)

Location
- Country: United States
- State: North Carolina
- County: Rockingham; Guilford

Physical characteristics
- Source: divide between Rose Creek and Reedy Fork
  - location: Apple Pond about 1.5 miles west of Osceola, North Carolina
  - coordinates: 36°13′21″N 079°38′16″W
  - elevation: 768 ft (234 m)
- Mouth: Haw River
  - location: about 1 mile southwest of Williamsburg, North Carolina
  - coordinates: 36°16′06″N 079°36′28″W
  - elevation: 650 ft (200 m)
- Length: 3.52 mi (5.66 km)
- Basin size: 5.69 square miles (14.7 km^{2})
- Discharge
  - location: Haw River
  - average: 7.00 cu ft/s (0.198 m^{3}/s) at mouth with Haw River

Basin features
- Progression: Haw River → Cape Fear River → Atlantic Ocean
- River system: Haw River
- Tributaries
  - left: unnamed tributaries
  - right: unnamed tributaries
- Waterbodies: Apple Pond
- Bridges: Chrismon Road, Poley Road, Candy Creek Road

Rose Creek is a 5.69 mi (9.16 km) long 2nd order tributary to the Haw River, in Guilford and Rockingham County, North Carolina.

== Course ==
Rose Creek rises in Apple Pond located in Guilford County on the divide between Rose Creek and Reedy Fork. Rose Creek then flows northeast into Rockingham County to meet the Haw River about 1 mile southwest of Williamsburg, North Carolina.

== Watershed ==
Rose Creek drains 5.69 square miles (14.7 km^{2}) of area, receives about 46.2 in/year of precipitation, and has a topographic wetness index of 406.57 and is about 39% forested.

== Natural history ==
The Rockingham County Natural Heritage Inventory recognized one location in the Rose Creek watershed, Williamsburg Alluvial Forest. Williamsburg Alluvial Forest is a county significant site that contains examples of Piedmont Alluvial Forest and Mesic Mixed Hardwood Forest.

== See also ==
- List of rivers of North Carolina

== Additional images ==
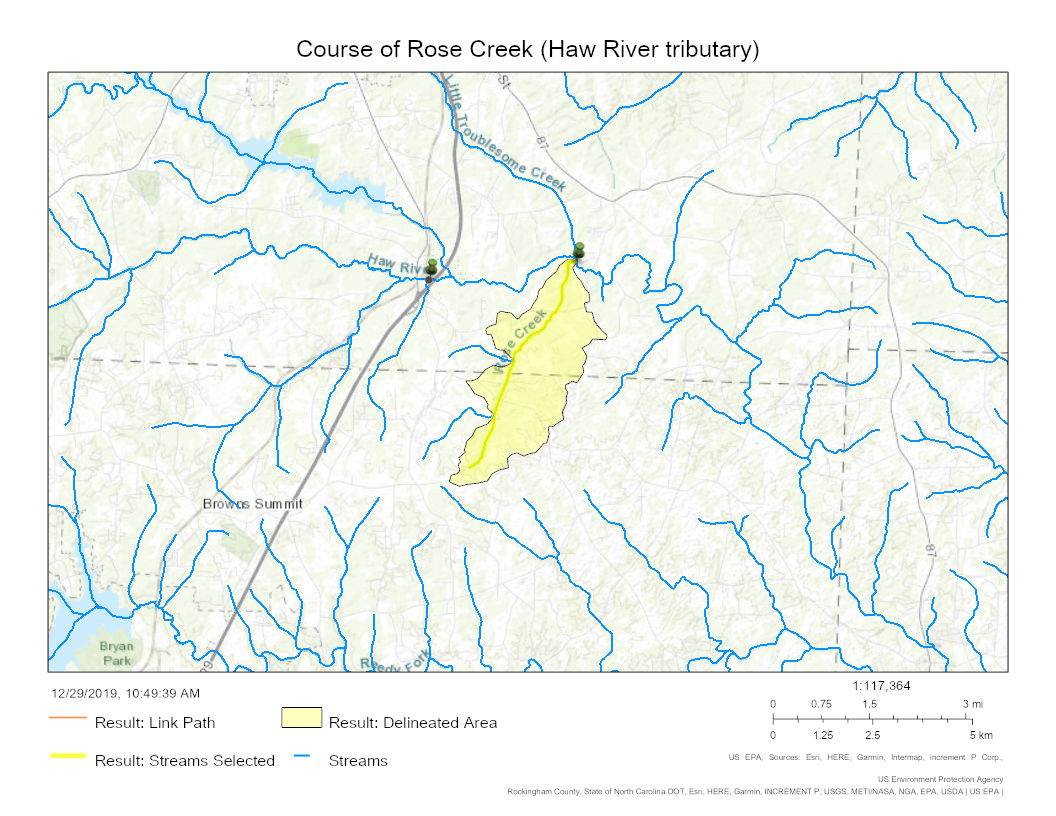
Course of Rose Creek (Haw River tributary) in Guilford and Rockingham County, North Carolina

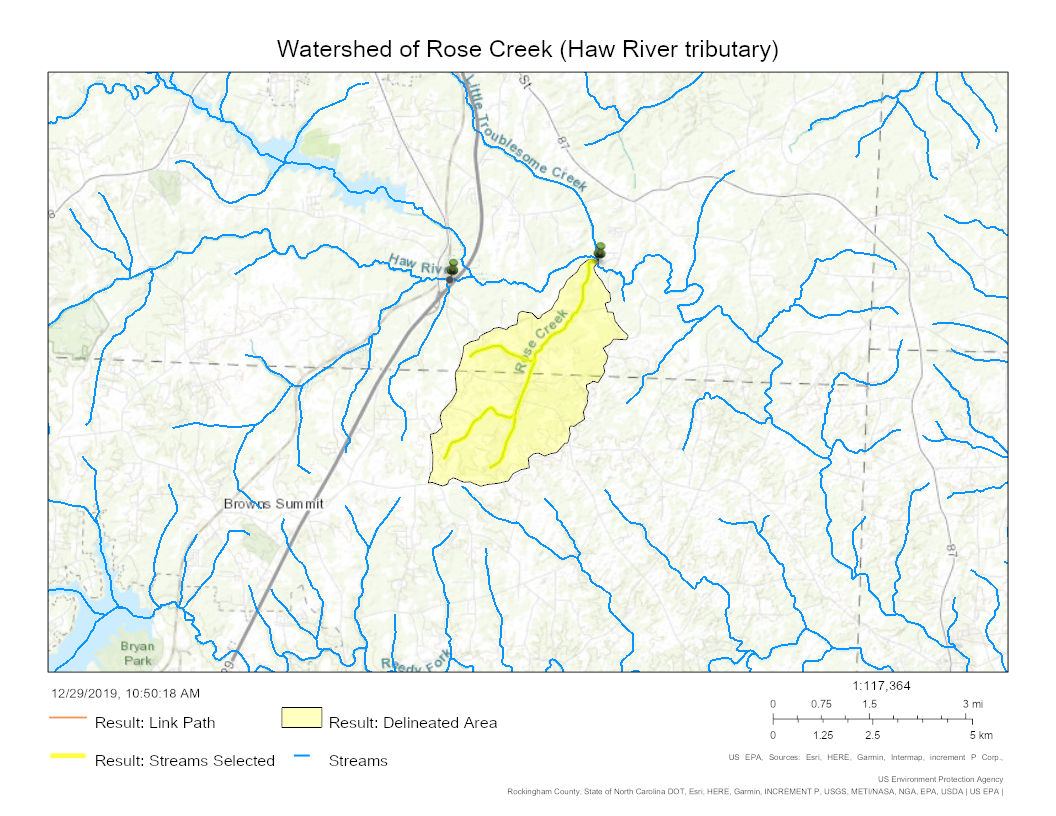
Watershed of Rose Creek (Haw River tributary) in Guilford and Rockingham County, North Carolina
