= Terrells Mountain =

Hill in Chatham County, North Carolina

Coordinates: 35°51′59″N 79°10′02″W

- Terrell's Mountain
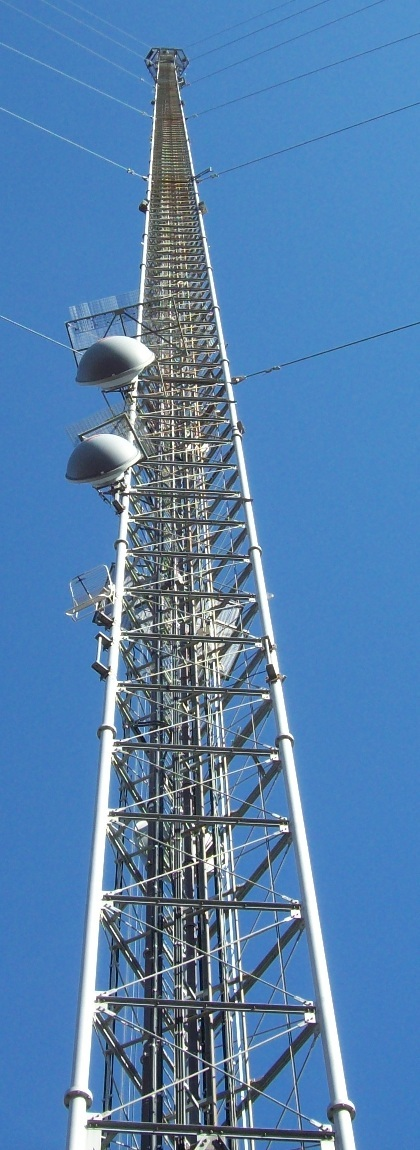
- Antenna tower on Terrells Mountain

Geography
- Location within North Carolina
- Location: Chatham County, North Carolina, U.S.

Geology
- Mountain type: Hill

Climbing
- Easiest route: Road / Access to antennas

Terrells Mountain or Terrell's Mountain is a hill in Chatham County, North Carolina, about 5–10 miles southwest of Chapel Hill.

Terrells Mountain contains several radio transmission antennas, the tallest of which stands at the summit and rises about 1,300 feet (400 m). The summit itself is 755 feet (230 m) above sea level.

The primary user of the antennas is WUNC and its sister stations which broadcast the public radio service operated by the nearby University of North Carolina.
