= List of North Carolina placenames of Native American origin =

The following list includes settlements, geographic features, and political subdivisions of North Carolina whose names are derived from Native American languages.

== Listings ==
=== Counties ===
- Alamance County
- Alleghany County
- Catawba County
  - Catawba
  - Catawba River
  - South Fork Catawba River
- Cherokee County – named after the Cherokee people.
  - Town of Cherokee
- Chowan County
- Currituck County
- Pamlico County
- Pasquotank County
  - Pasquotank River
- Perquimans County
  - Perquimans River
- Watauga County
  - Watauga River
- Yadkin County
  - Yadkinville
  - Yadkin College
  - Yadkin River
  - South Yadkin River
  - Little Yadkin River

=== Settlements ===
- Ahoskie
- Altamahaw
- Arapahoe
- Bogue
- Bolivia
- Burgaw
- Coinjock
- Cullowhee
- Etowah
- Hatteras
  - Hatteras Inlet
  - Hatteras Island
- Hiwassee
  - Township of Hiawassee
  - Hiwassee River
  - Hiwassee Reservoir
- Hobucken
- Lake Toxaway
  - Lake Toxaway
- Manteo
- Neuse Forest
  - Neuse River
- Ocracoke
  - Ocracoke Inlet
  - Ocracoke Island
- Ossipee
- Roanoke Island
  - Roanoke River
  - Roanoke Canal
- Sauratown Mountains
- Saxapahaw
- Swannanoa
- Wakulla
- Wanchese
- Waxhaw

=== Bodies of water ===
- Calabash River
- Chattooga River
- Chatuge Lake
  - Chatuge Dam
- Cheoah River
- Chinquapin Branch
  - Little Chinquapin Branch
- Chocowinity
  - Chocowinity Bay
- Chowan River
- Cohooque Creek
- Contentnea Creek
  - Little Contentnea Creek
- Cullasaja River
- Donoho Creek
- Eno River
- Great Coharie Creek
  - Little Coharie Creek
- Hyco River
  - Hyco Creek
  - South Hyco Creek
  - Hyco Lake
- Lake Mattamuskeet
- Lake Santeetlah
- Lake Tahoma
- Lake Waccamaw
- Little Tennessee River
- Meherrin River
- Moccasin Creek
- Moccasin Creek (Contentnea Creek tributary)
  - Mocassin Run
- Nahunta Swamp
- Nantahala Lake
  - Nantahala River
  - Nantahala National Forest
  - Southern Nantahala Wilderness
- Nolichucky River
- Nottely River
- North Pacolet River
- Nottoway River
- Oconaluftee River
- Pamlico River
  - Pamlico Sound
- Pocoson Branch
  - Pocoson Branch (Trent River tributary)
- Possum Swamp
- Possumquarter Creek
- Potecasi Creek
- Raccoon Branch
  - West Prong Raccoon Creek
- Saponi Creek
- Sapony Creek
  - Little Sapony Creek
- Scuppernong River
- Seneca Branch
- Shaddox Creek
  - Little Shaddox Creek
- Shocco Creek
  - Little Shocco Creek
- Swannanoa River
- Tallulah River
- Tellico River
- Tuckahoe Creek
- Tuckasegee River
- Uwharrie River
  - Little Uwharrie River
- Waccamaw River
- Wiccacon River

=== Other ===
- Bogue Banks

== See also ==
- List of place names of Native American origin in the United States
