= List of rivers of North Carolina =

This is a list of rivers in the U.S. state of North Carolina.

== By drainage basin ==
This list is arranged by drainage basin, with respective tributaries alphabetically indented under each larger stream's name.

=== Atlantic Ocean ===
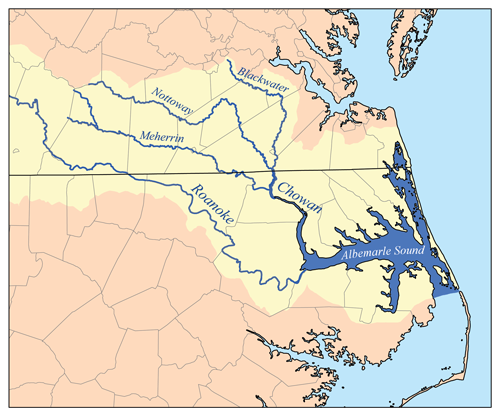
Chowan and lower Roanoke drainage basins

- North Landing River
  - Northwest River
- North River
- Pasquotank River
- Little River
- Perquimans River
- Yeopim River
- Chowan River
  - Wiccacon River
  - Meherrin River
    - Potecasi Creek
    - Worrell Mill Swamp
      - Hares Branch
  - Blackwater River
  - Nottoway River
- Cashie River

==== Roanoke River ====
- Roanoke River
  - Dan River
    - Aarons Creek
      - Crooked Fork
    - Hyco River
      - Castle Creek
      - Storys Creek
      - Powells Creek
      - Ghent Creek
      - Cane Creek
      - Sargents Creek
      - Hyco Creek
        - Cobbs Creek
        - Kilgore Creek
        - Coneys Creek
        - Panther Branch
        - Lynch Creek
        - Negro Creek
      - South Hyco Creek
        - Little Duck Creek
        - Richland Creek
        - Cub Creek
        - Double Creek
        - Sugartree Creek
    - Smith River
    - Mayo River
    - Little Dan River

==== Albemarle Sound ====
- Scuppernong River
- Alligator River
- Long Shoal River

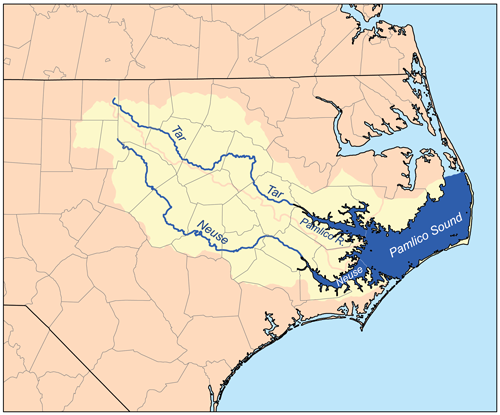
Pamlico and Neuse drainage basins

== Pamlico River ==
- Pamlico River
  - Pungo River

=== Tar River ===
  - Tar River
    - Kennedy Creek
    - Tranters Creek
      - Cherry Run
      - Mitchell Branch
      - Maple Branch
      - Aggie Run
      - Pocoson Branch
      - Pea Branch
      - Poley Branch
      - Horsepen Swamp
      - Haw Branch
      - Briery Swamp
        - Great Branch Meadow Branch
      - Pinelog Branch
      - Turkey Swamp
        - Bear Grass Swamp
      - Collie Swamp
      - Flat Swamp
    - Bear Creek
      - Chapel Branch
    - Chicod Creek
      - Juniper Branch
        - Bates Branch
      - Cow Swamp
        - Cabin Branch
        - Cross Swamp
    - Grindle Creek
      - Whichard Branch
        - Mill Branch
    - Moyes Run
      - Cannon Swamp
      - Baldwin Swamp
    - Phillippi Branch
    - Barber Creek
    - Hardee Creek
      - Meeting House Branch
        - Bell Branch
    - Greens Mill Run
      - Reedy Branch
      - Fomes Branch
    - Parker Creek
    - Schoolhouse Branch
    - Harris Mill Run
    - Johnsons Mill Run
    - Bryan Creek
    - Sains Branch
    - Tyson Creek
      - Lawrence Run
    - Conetoe Creek
      - Mitchell Swamp
        - Knight Canal
      - Lewis Canal
      - Crisp Creek
      - Fountain Fork Creek
    - Otter Creek
    - Cheeks Mill Creek
    - Town Creek
      - Bynum Mill Creek
      - Cokey Swamp
        - Sasnett Mill Branch
        - Beaverdam Branch
        - Millpond Branch
        - Cabin Branch
        - Deloach Branch
        - Dickson Branch
        - Parker Branch
        - Little Cokey Swamp
      - Corn Creek
      - Williamson Branch
      - Cattail Swamp
        - White Swamp
          - Cattail Branch
    - Jerrys Creek
    - Cromwell Canal
    - Hendricks Creek
      - Holly Creek
    - East Tarboro Canal

==== Fishing Creek ====
    - Fishing Creek
      - Deep Creek
        - Longs Branch
        - Savage Mill Run
        - Indian Branch
        - Marsh Swamp
          - Cow Haul Swamp
          - Burnt Coat Swamp
            - Breeches Swamp
              - Jacket Swamp
          - Beaverdam Swamp
          - Dog Pond Branch
          - Martin Swamp
      - Rocky Swamp
        - Jack Horse Swamp
      - Beaverdam Swamp
        - Black Swamp
        - Pinelog Branch
      - Little Fishing Creek
        - Bear Swamp
        - Porter Creek
        - Reedy Creek
          - Bobbitts Branch
        - Bens Creek
        - Big Branch
        - Walkers Creek
          - Dowlins Creek
      - Crooked Swamp
      - White Oak Swamp
      - Shocco Creek
        - Little Shocco Creek
        - Cabin Branch
        - Lees Branch
        - Buzzard Branch
      - Maple Swamp
      - Hogpen Branch
      - Bobs Branch
      - Gunters Creek
      - Reedy Branch
      - Long Branch
      - Buffalo Branch
      - Gum Pond Branch
      - Mill Branch
      - Wolfpit Branch
      - Black Branch
      - Possumquarter Creek
      - Richneck Creek
      - Bridle Creek
      - Horse Creek
      - Phoebes Creek
      - Owens Creek
      - Rocky Creek
      - Matthews Creek

==== Swift Creek ====
    - Swift Creek
      - Leggett Canal
      - White Oak Swamp
      - Moccasin Creek
      - Lane Swamp
      - Flat Rock Branch
      - Gideon Swamp
      - Sandy Creek
        - Tumbling Run
          - Jumping Run
          - Terry Branch
        - Red Bud Creek
        - Shelley Branch
        - Deer Branch
        - Richland Creek
          - Crabtree Creek
        - Devils Cradle Creek
          - Flatrock Creek
        - Buffalo Creek
        - Weaver Creek
        - Dickies Creek
        - Cattail Creek
        - Martin Creek
        - Pounder Branch
    - Penders Mill Run
      - Raccoon Branch
    - Key Branch
    - Walnut Creek
    - Beech Branch
      - Falling Run
    - Buck Swamp
    - Gay Branch
    - Hornbeam Branch
      - Compass Creek
    - Cowlick Branch
    - Goose Branch
    - Stony Creek
      - Pig Basket Creek
      - Little Peachtree Creek
      - Big Peachtree Creek
        - Back Swamp
        - Beaverdam Branch
        - Bear Creek
        - Wildcat Branch
    - Maple Creek
      - Polecat Branch
        - Hicks Branch
    - Grape Branch
    - Sapony Creek
      - Big Branch
      - Little Sapony Creek
      - Henry Branch
        - Gabe Branch
      - Bear Branch
    - Jacob Branch
    - Long Branch
    - Turkey Creek
      - Coker Creek
      - White Creek
    - Biddie Toe Creek
    - Cypress Creek
      - Long Branch
    - Crooked Creek
    - Cedar Creek
      - Big Branch Creek
      - Camping Creek
      - Brandy Creek
    - Jumping Run
    - Wolfpen Branch
    - Sycamore Creek
    - Fox Creek
    - Coole Creek
    - Bear Swamp Creek
    - Buffalo Creek
    - Lynch Creek
    - Billys Creek
    - Kings Creek
    - Buffalo Creek
    - Tabbs Creek
    - Taylors Creek
      - McGee Creek
    - Middle Creek
    - Ford Creek
    - Gibbs Creek
    - Sand Creek
    - Fishing Creek
      - Coon Creek
      - Hachers Run
    - Aycock Creek
      - Johnson Creek
    - Bollens Creek
      - Boulding Creek
    - Cattail Creek
    - Jackson Creek
    - Rocky Creek
    - Owen Creek
    - North Fork Tar River
    - Shelton Creek
      - Fox Creek
    - Cub Creek
        - Moore Swamp

==== Neuse River ====
- Neuse River
  - Swan Creek
  - Broad Creek
    - Brown Creek
  - Brown Creek
  - Orchard Creek
  - South River
    - Hardy Creek
    - Big Creek
    - Mulberry Creek
    - Old House Creek
    - Dixon Creek
    - Coffee Creek
    - Royal Creek
    - Little Creek
    - Eastman Creek
    - Southwest Creek
    - Doe Creek
    - Buck Creek
    - Duck Creek
    - Neal Creek
    - Elishu Creek
    - Miry Gut
    - West Fork
    - East Fork
      - Rich Island Gut
  - Pierce Creek
  - Berrys Creek
  - Garbacon Creek
  - Whittaker Creek
  - Greens Creek
    - Camp Creek
      - Smith Creek
        - Morris Creek
    - Kershaw Creek
  - Adams Creek
    - Godfrey Creek
    - Delamar Creek
    - Sandy Huss Creek
    - Dumpling Creek
    - Cedar Creek
      - Jonaquin Creek
      - Cullie Creek
    - Kellum Creek
    - Kearney Creek
    - Issac Creek
    - Back Creek
  - Courts Creek
  - Great Neck Creek
  - Long Creek
  - Dawson Creek
    - Tarkiln Creek
    - Granny Gut
    - Deep Run
    - Wheeler Gut
    - Fork Run
  - Clubfoot Creek
    - Mitchell Creek
      - Big Branch
      - Snake Branch
    - Gulden Creek
    - Mortens Mill Pond
      - East Prong
      - West Prong
  - Gatlin Creek
  - Sassafras Branch
  - King Creek
  - Cherry Branch
  - Alligator Gut
  - Gum Branch
  - Handcock Creek
    - Still Gut
      - Reeds Gut
    - Cohooque Creek
      - Still Gut
      - Barney Branch
      - Spe Branch
    - Little John Creek
    - Jacks Branch
    - Dolls Gut
    - Shop Branch
    - Deep Branch
    - Moebucks Branch
  - Mill Creek
  - Beard Creek
    - Caraway Creek
    - Purifoy Gut
    - Cedar Gut
    - East Prong
  - Slocum Creek
    - Anderson Creek
    - Tucker Creek
      - Sandy Run
        - Miry Branch
      - Goodwin Creek
      - Daniels Branch
    - Mill Creek
      - Hunters Branch
    - Alligator Gut
    - Cedar Creek
    - East Prong
      - Sandy Branch
      - Caps Branch
    - Southwest Prong
      - Wolf Pit Branch
      - Black Swamp Creek
      - East Branch
      - West Branch
  - Lower Duck Creek
  - Otter Creek
    - Crooked Run
  - Goose Creek
    - Cypress Creek
    - Alexander Swamp
    - Black Creek
    - Simmons Branch
    - Deep Run Branch
    - East Fork
    - West Fork
  - Upper Broad Creek
    - Deep Run
    - Sasses Branch
    - Mill Swamp
      - Morgan Swamp
    - Possum Swamp
      - Savannah Bridge Swamp
  - Northwest Creek
  - Duck Creek
  - Scotts Creek
  - Trent River
    - Lawson Creek
    - Brice Creek
      - East Prong
      - West Prong
      - Great Branch
      - Lees Branch
      - Black Branch
      - Georges Branch
    - Hoods Creek
    - Wilson Creek
    - Reedy Branch
    - Rocky Run
    - Miry Hole Branch
    - Island Creek
    - Scott Creek
    - West Prong Raccoon Creek
    - Mill Creek
    - Goshen Branch
    - Little Hell Creek
    - Mill Run
    - Long Branch
    - Beaverdam Creek
    - Jumping Creek
    - French Branch
    - Crooked Run
    - Musselshell Branch
    - Resolution Branch
    - Beaver Creek
    - Chinquapin Branch
    - Poplar Branch
    - Pocoson Branch
    - Little Chinquapin Branch
    - Jack Cabin Branch
    - Mill Branch
    - Cypress Creek
    - Reedy Branch
    - Black Swamp
    - Tuckahoe Creek
    - Joshua Creek
    - Beaverdam Swamp
    - Horse Branch
    - Running Branch
  - Smith Creek
  - Mills Branch
  - Rennys Creek
  - Bachelor Creek
    - Caswell Branch
    - Round Tree Branch
    - Beech Tree Branch
    - Jumping Run
    - Beaverdam Branch
    - Deep Branch
    - Rollover Creek
    - Hollis Branch
  - Swift Creek
    - Little Swift Creek
      - Fisher Swamp
        - Beaverdam Swamp
      - Pine Tree Swamp
      - Bushy Fork
    - Bear Branch
    - Mauls Swamp
    - Palmetto Swamp
    - Clayroot Swamp
      - Creeping Swamp
        - Polland Swamp
      - Indian Well Swamp
      - Thorofare Swamp
    - Fork Swamp
    - Simmon Branch
    - Horsepen Swamp
    - Gum Swamp
  - Pinetree Creek
  - Taylor Creek
  - Turkey Quarter Creek
  - Core Creek
    - Flat Swamp
    - Mill Branch
    - Grape Creek
  - Village Creek
  - Halfmoon Creek
  - Grinnel Creek
  - Alum Springs Branch
  - Contentnea Creek
    - Eagle Swamp
    - Little Contentnea Creek
      - Middle Swamp
        - Sandy Run
      - Pinelog Branch
      - Oldwoman Branch
      - Jacob Branch
        - Black Swamp
          - Langs Mill Run
      - Thompson Swamp
        - Lighter Knot Swamp
      - Ward Run
    - Polecat Branch
    - Wheat Swamp
      - Hallam Branch
    - Mussel Run
    - Beaverdam Run
    - Rainbow Creek
      - Sowell Run
      - Horsepen Branch
    - Shepherd Run
    - Poorhouse Run
    - Panther Swamp Creek
    - Tyson Marsh
      - Spring Branch
      - Reedy Branch
      - Mink Point Branch
      - Jacks Fork
    - Mill Run
      - Washington Branch
    - Fort Run
      - Lewis Branch
      - Lang Branch
    - Nahunta Swamp
      - Appletree Swamp
      - Cow Branch
      - Beaver Branch
      - Mill Branch
      - Button Branch
        - Buzzard Branch
        - Hams Prong
      - Beaver Dam
      - The Slough
        - Exum Mill Branch
          - Jimmy Prong
        - Mocassin Run
        - Long Branch
      - Poplar Branch
      - Buck Meadow Branch
      - Perkins Old Mill Branch
    - Beaman Run
      - Howell Swamp
    - Water Branch
    - Watery Branch
    - Toisnot Swamp
      - Goss Swamp
      - Whiteoak Swamp
        - Buck Branch
        - Mill Branch
      - Little Swamp
      - Beaverdam Creek
      - Whiteoak Swamp
    - Black Creek
      - Aycock Swamp
      - Mill Run
      - Great Swamp
        - Juniper Swamp
          - White Oak Swamp
          - Brandy Branch Swamp
      - Cedar Creek
      - Lee Swamp
      - Robin Swamp
    - Hominy Swamp
    - Bloomery Swamp
    - Shepard Branch
    - Mill Branch
    - Little Swamp
    - Marsh Swamp
    - Buckhorn Branch
    - Little Creek
    - Mill Branch
    - Turkey Creek
      - Haw Branch
        - Camp Branch
      - Big Branch
      - Driving Branch
      - Press Prong
      - Wolfharbor Branch
    - Moccasin Creek
      - Bull Branch
      - Little Creek
      - Beaverdam Creek
  - Mosley Creek
    - Alligator Branch
    - Snake Hole Branch
      - Little Snake Hole Branch
    - Harrys Branch
    - Folley Branch
  - Beaverdam Branch
  - Bone Gray Branch
  - Stonyton Creek
    - Jericho Run
    - Briery Run
      - Taylors Branch
  - Southwest Creek
    - Heath Branch
    - Mill Branch
    - Strawberry Branch
    - Mott Swamp
    - Spring Branch
    - Clarks Branch
    - Hornpipe Branch
    - Horse Branch
    - Turkey Branch
      - Deep Run
        - Toms Branch
        - Gray Branch
  - Adkin Branch
  - Peter Creek
  - Falling Creek
    - Gum Swamp Creek
    - White Marsh Run
    - Moseley Creek
      - Groundnut Creek
    - Jumping Run
  - Whitleys Creek
  - Squirrel Creek
  - Manley Branch
    - Vernon Branch
  - Belch Branch
  - Bear Creek
    - Mill Branch
    - Meeting House Branch
    - West Bear Creek
      - Peters Branch
      - Old Mill Branch
    - Little Marsh Run
    - Mill Run
    - Hullett Branch
      - Drew Branch
        - Hinson Branch
    - Seneca Branch
  - Hardy Mill Run
    - Trotters Creek
      - Frank Nunn Branch
      - Bens Branch
      - Tar River
      - Jacks Branch
    - Dalys Creek
      - Panther Creek
      - John Benton Branch
  - Cox Creek
    - South Prong
    - West Prong
  - Mill Creek
    - Still Creek
  - Walnut Creek
  - Walker Mill Run
    - Powell Run
  - Sleepy Creek
    - Cabin Branch
    - Tommy Reed Creek
      - Burnt Mill Branch
  - Pine Level Branch
  - Green Branch
  - Fellows Branch
  - Stoney Creek
    - Billy Branch
    - Reedy Branch
    - Howell Branch
    - Stoney Run
  - Carroway Creek
  - Poplar Branch
  - Little River
  - Walnut Creek
  - Crabtree Creek
    - Marsh Creek
    - Bridges Branch
    - Pigeon House Branch
    - Big Branch
    - Beaverdam Creek
    - Mine Creek
    - House Creek
    - Hare Snipe Creek
    - Richland Creek
    - Sycamore Creek
    - Reedy Creek
    - Haleys Branch
    - Stirrup Iron Creek
    - Coles Branch
    - Turkey Creek
  - Ellerbe Creek
  - Eno River
    - Little River
  - Flat River
- North River
- Newport River
- White Oak River
- New River

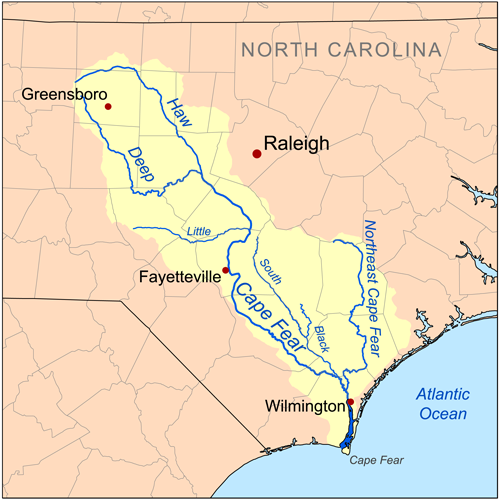
Cape Fear River

==== Cape Fear River ====
- Cape Fear River
  - Elizabeth River
  - Brunswick River
  - Northeast Cape Fear River
  - Black River
    - South River
      - Black River
    - Great Coharie Creek
      - Little Coharie Creek
    - Six Runs Creek
  - Donoho Creek
  - Bandeau Creek
  - Hammonds Creek
  - Pemberton Creek
  - Mulford Creek
  - Turnbull Creek
  - Browns Creek
  - Ellis Creek
  - Bakers Creek
  - Harrison Creek
  - Phillips Creek
  - Georgia Branch
  - Willis Creek
  - Grays Creek
  - Cedar Creek
  - Rockfish Creek (Cape Fear River tributary)
  - Cross Creek (Cape Fear River tributary)
  - Little River
  - Juniper Creek
  - Upper Little River
  - Thorntons Creek
  - Buies Creek
  - Poorhouse Creek
  - Dry Creek
  - Neills Creek
  - Hector Creek
  - Fish Creek
  - Little Creek
  - Avents Creek
  - Camels Creek
  - Cedar Creek
  - Parkers Creek
  - Daniels Creek
  - Fall Creek
  - Buckhorn Creek
  - Bush Creek
  - Gulf Creek
  - Lick Creek
  - Little Shaddox Creek
  - Wombles Creek
  - Deep River
    - Rocky Branch
    - Rocky River
      - Bear Creek
      - Harlands Creek
      - Landrum Creek
      - Tick Creek
      - Meadow Creek
      - Varnall Creek
      - Loves Creek
      - Nick Creek
      - Lacys Creek
      - Mud Lick Creek
      - Greenbrier Creek
      - North Rocky River Prong
    - Little Buffalo Creek
    - Georges Creek
    - Big Buffalo Creek
    - Cedar Creek
    - Patterson Creek
    - Pocket Creek
    - Indian Creek
    - Smiths Creek
    - Line Creek
    - Big Governors Creek
    - McLendons Creek
    - Lick Creek
    - Tysons Creek
    - Scotchman Creek
    - Buffalo Creek
    - Falls Creek
    - Cedar Creek
    - Bear Creek
    - Grassy Creek
    - Fork Creek
    - Flat Creek
    - Brush Creek
    - Richland Creek
    - Back Branch
    - Broad Mouth Branch
    - Millstone Creek
    - Mill Creek
    - Reed Creek
    - Sandy Creek
    - Bush Creek
    - Gabriels Creek
    - Hasketts Creek
    - Polecat Creek
    - Muddy Creek
    - Hickory Creek
    - Richland Creek
    - Copper Branch
    - Bull Run
    - West Fork Deep River
    - East Fork Deep River
  - Haw River
    - Shaddox Creek
    - New Hope River (submerged)
      - New Hope Creek
    - Stinking Creek
    - Roberson Creek
    - Pokeberry Creek
    - Brooks Creek
    - Wilkinson Creek
    - Dry Creek
    - Terrells Creek (Left Bank)
    - Collins Creek
    - Big Branch
    - Cane Creek (Right Bank)
    - Cane Creek (Left Bank)
    - Marys Creek
    - Motes Creek
    - Meadow Creek
    - Varnals Creek
    - Haw Creek
    - Big Alamance Creek
      - Little Alamance Creek
      - Stinking Quarter Creek
    - Back Creek
    - Boyds Creek
    - Service Creek
    - Stony Creek
    - Travis Creek
    - Reedy Fork
      - Buffalo Creek
      - Katie Branch
      - Rocky Branch
      - Smith Branch
      - Squirrel Creek
      - Richland Creek
      - Long Branch
      - Horsepen Creek
      - Brush Creek
      - Moores Creek
      - Beaver Creek
    - Giles Creek
    - Rose Creek
    - Little Troublesome Creek
    - Troublesome Creek
    - Candy Creek
    - Benaja Creek
    - Mears Fork
    - Rock Branch
- Lockwood Folly River
  - Pinch Gut Creek
- Shallotte River
- Calabash River
- Little River

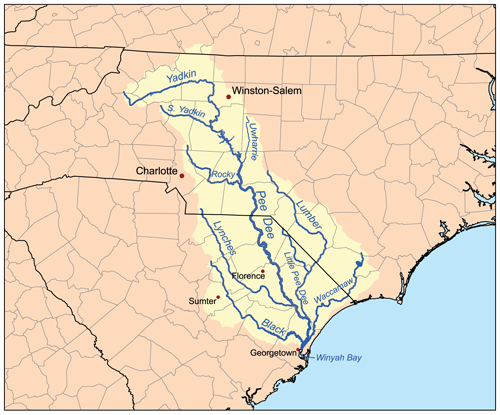
Yadkin–Pee Dee River Basin

==== Pee Dee River ====
- Pee Dee River
  - Waccamaw River
  - Little Pee Dee River (SC)
    - Lumber River
      - Drowning Creek
        - Hills Creek
        - Little Creek
        - Mountain Creek
        - Quewhiffle Creek
        - Aberdeen Creek
        - Horse Creek
          - Deep Creek
        - Big Branch
        - Naked Creek
        - Jackson Creek
  - Lynches River
  - Little River
  - Brown Creek
    - Pinch Gut Creek
  - Rocky River
    - Lanes Creek
    - Little Meadow Creek
    - Dutch Buffalo Creek
      - Adams Creek
      - Little Buffalo Creek
      - Black Run Creek
      - Jennie Wolf Creek
      - Lick Branch
    - Irish Buffalo Creek
      - Cold Water Creek
    - Back Creek
    - Mallard Creek
      - Stony Creek
      - Toby Creek
      - Doby Creek
      - Clarks Creek
      - Doby Creek
    - Coddle Creek
      - Wolf Meadow Branch
      - Afton Run
  - Uwharrie River
    - Caraway Creek
      - Taylors Creek
      - Back Creek
      - Little Caraway Creek
    - Little Uwharrie River
  - Yadkin River
    - Dutch John Creek
    - Abbotts Creek
    - South Yadkin River
    - Little Yadkin River
    - Ararat River
      - Skin Cabin Creek
      - Pilot Creek
      - Bull Creek
        - Whittier Creek
      - Toms Creek
      - Flat Shoal Creek
      - Oldfield Creek
      - Caddle Creek
      - Rutledge Creek
      - Stewarts Creek
        - Burkes Creek
        - Beech Creek
        - Turners Creek
        - Pauls Creek
          - Brushy Fork
        - Benson Creek
        - Moores Fork
        - Stony Creek
          - Huntington Branch
        - Naked Run
      - Lovills Creek
        - Rocky Creek
        - School House Creek
      - Seed Cane Creek
      - Faulkner Creek
      - Champ Creek
      - Johnson Creek
    - Fisher River
      - Davenport Creek
      - Pheasant Creek
      - Dunagan Creek
      - Bear Creek
      - Cody Creek
      - Little Beaver Creek
      - Beaver Creek
      - Horns Creek
      - Cooks Creek
      - Little Fisher River
      - Burris Creek
      - Flat Branch
      - Red Hill Creek
      - Endicott Creek
      - Sage Creek
      - Camp Branch
      - Roaring Fork
      - Gully Creek
    - Mitchell River
    - Elkin Creek
      - Long Branch
      - Grassy Creek
      - Grassy Fork
    - Little Elkin Creek
    - Grays Creek
    - Roaring River
      - Stewart Creek
    - Mulberry Creek
    - Reddies River
      - Hoopers Branch
      - Lousy Creek
      - Kilby Branch
      - Tumbling Shoals Creek
      - Quarry Branch

== Santee River ==
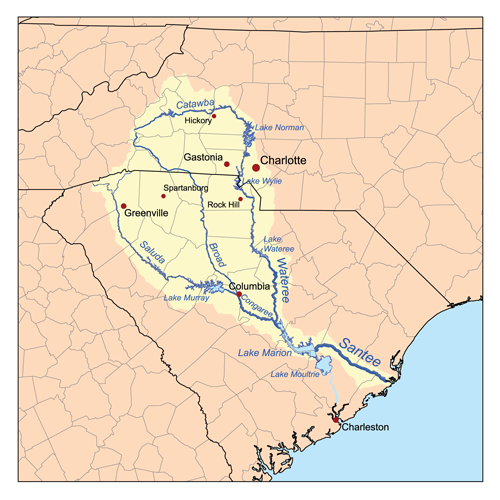
Santee drainage basin

- Santee River (SC)
  - Wateree River (SC)

=== Catawba River ===
- Catawba River

- South Fork Catawba River

- Henry Fork
- Jacob Fork River

- Lower Little River
- Middle Little River
- Upper Little River
- Johns River
- Linville River

- Congaree River (SC)

- Broad River

- Pacolet River (SC)

- North Pacolet River

- Bowens River
- First Broad River
- Second Broad River
- Green River

- Hungry River

- Little Hungry River

- Savannah River (SC and GA)
  - Seneca River (SC)
    - Keowee River (SC)

- Toxaway River

- Horsepasture River

- Whitewater River

- Thompson River

- Tugaloo River (SC and GA)

- Chattooga River
- Tallulah River

- Coleman River

- Adams Branch (Richardson Creek tributary)
- Fishing Creek (Catawba River) (NC and SC)

== Gulf of Mexico ==
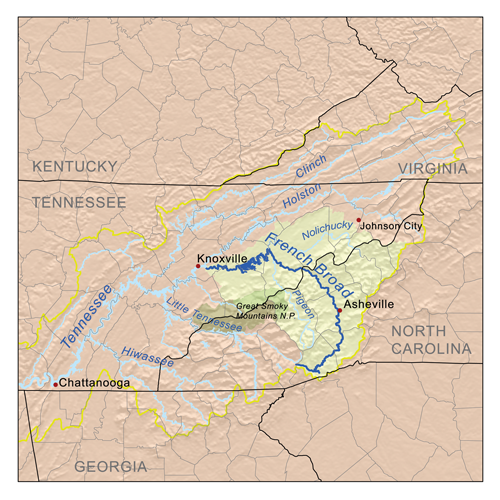
French Broad drainage basin

- Mississippi River
  - Ohio River (KY, WV)
    - Tennessee River (KY, TN)
      - Hiwassee River
        - Nottely River
        - Valley River
      - Little Tennessee River
        - Tellico River
        - Cheoah River
        - Tuckasegee River
          - Oconaluftee River
        - Nantahala River
        - Cullasaja River
      - French Broad River
        - Nolichucky River
          - Cane River
          - North Toe River
            - South Toe River
        - Pigeon River
        - Swannanoa River
        - Mills River
        - Little River
        - Davidson River
        - Ivy River (Creek)
      - Holston River (TN)
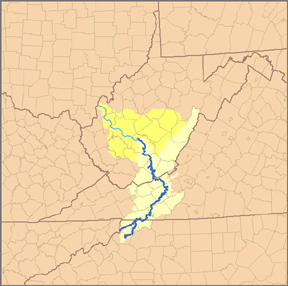
        New River drainage basin
        - South Fork Holston River (TN)
          - Watauga River
            - Elk River
    - Kanawha River (WV)
      - New River
        - Little River
        - North Fork New River
        - South Fork New River

== Alphabetically ==
- Adams Creek
- Afton Run
- Alligator River
- Ararat River
- Back Creek (Rocky River tributary)
- Barkers Branch
- Beaverdam Creek (Lanes Creek tributary)
- Big Branch (Lanes Creek tributary)
- Black River
- Black Run Creek
- Black Jack Branch (Brown Creek tributary)
- Blackwell Branch
- Bluewing Creek
- Bowes Branch
- Brice Creek
- Broad River
- Brown Creek (Pee Dee River tributary)
- Caddle Creek (Ararat River tributary)
- Cane Creek (Hyco River tributary)
- Cane River
- Canebreak Branch
- Cape Fear River
- Carolina Creek
- Cashie River
- Castle Creek
- Catawba River
- Cedar Branch (Lanes Creek tributary)
- Cheoah River
- Chowan River
- Clarks Creek
- Cobbs Creek
- Cold Water Creek
- Coleman River
- Coneys Creek
- Cool Spring Branch
- Cub Creek
- Cullasaja River
- Dan River
- Davidson River
- Deep River
- Doby Creek
- Double Creek
- Elk River
- Eno River
- First Broad River
- Fishing Creek (Catawba River)
- Fisher River
- French Broad River
- Great Pee Dee River
- Ghent Creek
- Gold Branch
- Gourdvine Creek
- Great Coharie Creek
- Green River
- Haw River
- Henry Fork
- Hoods Creek
- Hungry River
- Hyco Creek
- Hyco River
- Irish Buffalo Creek
- Jacob Fork
- Jennie Wolf Creek
- Johns River
- Jones Creek
- Kilgore Creek
- Lacey Branch
- Lick Branch
- Lick Branch (Lanes Creek tributary)
- Linville River
- Little Buffalo Creek
- Little Coharie Creek
- Little Duck Creek
- Little Fisher River
- Little Hungry River
- Little Meadow Creek
- Little River (Albemarle Sound)
- Little River (Cape Fear River tributary)
- Little River (Eno River tributary)
- Little River (French Broad River tributary)
- Little River (Horry County, South Carolina)
- Little River (Jacob Fork)
- Little River (Neuse River tributary)
- Little River (North Carolina-Virginia)
- Little River (Pee Dee River tributary)
- Little River (Roanoke River tributary)
- Little Tennessee River
- Little Uwharrie River
- Lockwood Folly River
- Lower Little River
- Lumber River
- Lynch Creek
- Lynches River
- Mallard Creek
- Mayo River
- McMullen Creek
- Meherrin River
- Middle Little River
- Mill Creek (Lanes Creek tributary)
- Mill Creek (Trent River tributary)
- Mills River
- Mill Run (Trent River tributary)
- Mitchell River
- Nantahala River
- Negro Creek
- Neuse River
- New Hope River
- New River – western North Carolina
- New River – southeastern North Carolina
- Nolichucky River
- Norkett Branch
- North Toe River
- Nottely River
- North Pacolet River
- Panther Branch
- Pine Log Creek
- North River
- Northeast Cape Fear River
- Pamlico River
- Panther Branch
- Pasquotank River
- Pee Dee River
- Perquimans River
- Pigeon River
- Powells Creek
- Reddies River
- Reedy Fork (Haw River tributary)
- Reedy Fork (Hyco Creek tributary)
- Richland Creek
- Roanoke River including Staunton River
- Roaring River
- Rocky River
- Rough Butt Creek
- Salem Creek
- Sargents Creek
- Scuppernong River
- Second Broad River
- Shallotte River
- Six Run Creek
- South Fork Catawba River
- South Hyco Creek
- South River
- South River (Neuse River estuary)
- South Toe River
- South Yadkin River
- Stegall Branch
- Stinking Quarter Creek
- Stony Creek
- Storys Creek
- Sugartree Creek
- Swannanoa River
- Tar River
- Toby Creek
- Trent River
- Tuckasegee River
- Upper Little River
- Uwharrie River
- Waccamaw River
- Watauga River
- Water Branch
- Waxhaw Branch
- White Oak River
- Whitewater River
- Wicker Branch
- Wide Mouth Branch
- Wilson Creek
- Wiccacon River
- Wolf Meadow Branch
- Yadkin River

== See also ==
- List of rivers in the United States
