= Adams Branch =

Adams Branch may refer to:

- Adams Branch (Richardson Creek tributary), a stream in Union County, North Carolina
- Adams Branch (South Grand River tributary), a stream in Cass County, Missouri
