= Fish Creek (Cape Fear River tributary) =

Stream in North Carolina, USA

Fish Creek Tributary to Cape Fear River
- Location of Fish Creek Creek mouth Fish Creek (Cape Fear River tributary) (the United States)

Location
- Country: United States
- State: North Carolina
- County: Harnett County

Physical characteristics
- Source: Camels Creek divide
  - location: Pond about 1 mile nonrt-northeast of Mamers, North Carolina
  - coordinates: 35°25′18″N 078°56′00″W
  - elevation: 335 ft (102 m)
- Mouth: Cape Fear River
  - location: about 4 miles southwest of Kipling, North Carolina
  - coordinates: 35°27′12″N 078°52′25″W
  - elevation: 115 ft (35 m)
- Length: 5.37 mi (8.64 km)
- Basin size: 7.68 square miles (19.9 km^{2})
- Discharge
  - location: Cape Fear River
  - average: 8.34 cu ft/s (0.236 m^{3}/s) at mouth with Cape Fear River

Basin features
- Progression: Cape Fear River → Atlantic Ocean
- River system: Cape Fear River
- Tributaries
  - left: unnamed tributaries
  - right: unnamed tributaries
- Bridges: US 421, Community Road, US 421, S River Road

Fish Creek is a 5.37 mi (8.64 km) long 2nd order tributary to the Cape Fear River in Harnett County, North Carolina. The lower reaches of this stream are in Raven Rock State Park.

== Course ==
Fish Creek rises in a pond about 1 mile north-northeast of Mamers, North Carolina and then flows southeast and makes a curve northeast to join the Cape Fear River about 4 miles southwest of Kipling, North Carolina.

== Watershed ==
Fish Creek drains 7.68 square miles (19.9 km^{2}) of area, receives about 46.1 in/year of precipitation, has a wetness index of 419.66 and is about 54% forested.

== See also ==
- List of rivers of North Carolina
