= Albemarle and Chesapeake Canal =

Historic district in North Carolina, US

- Albemarle and Chesapeake Canal Historic District
- U.S. National Register of Historic Places
- U.S. Historic district
- Virginia Landmarks Register
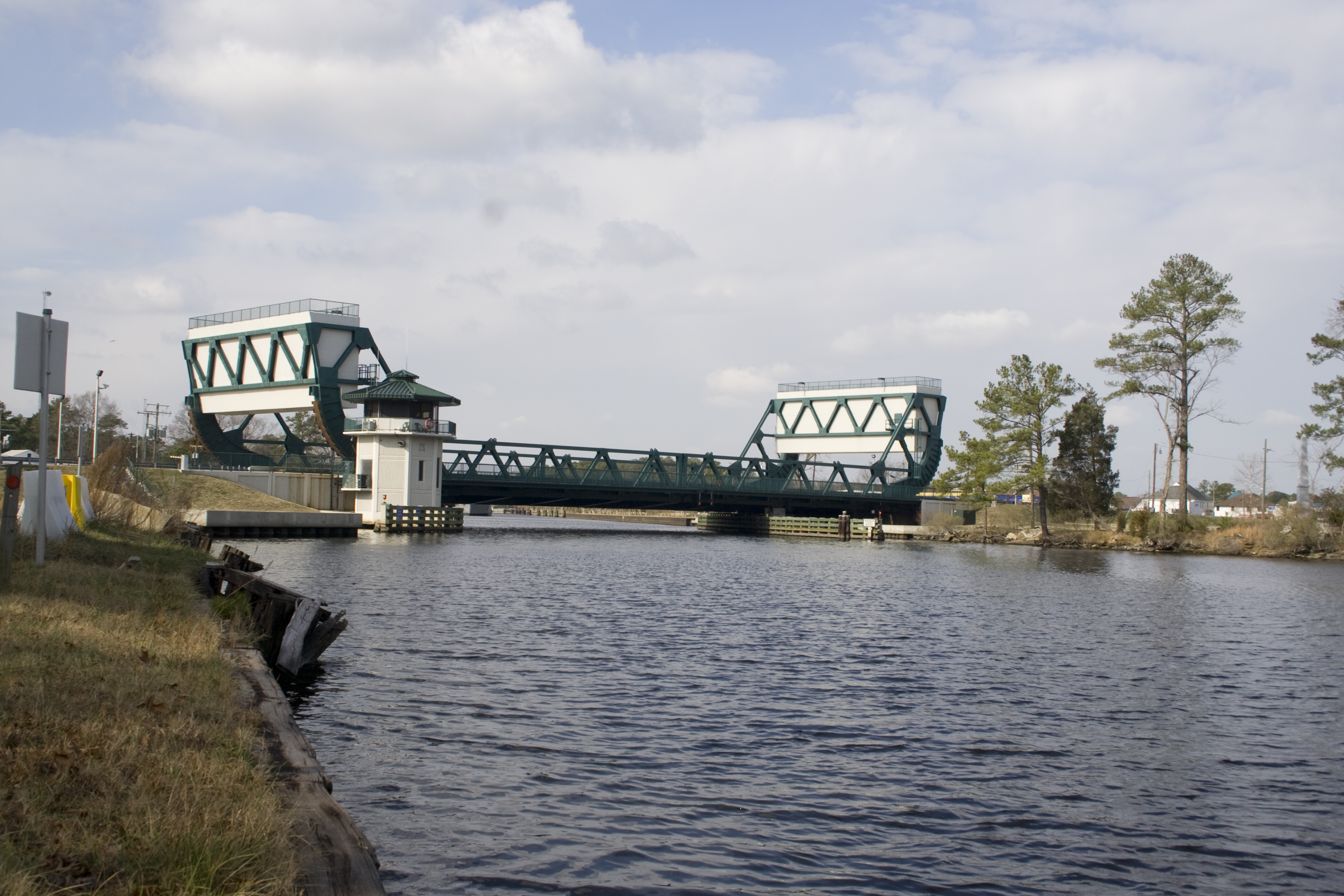
- The Great Bridge over the Canal

- Location within Virginia Location within the United States

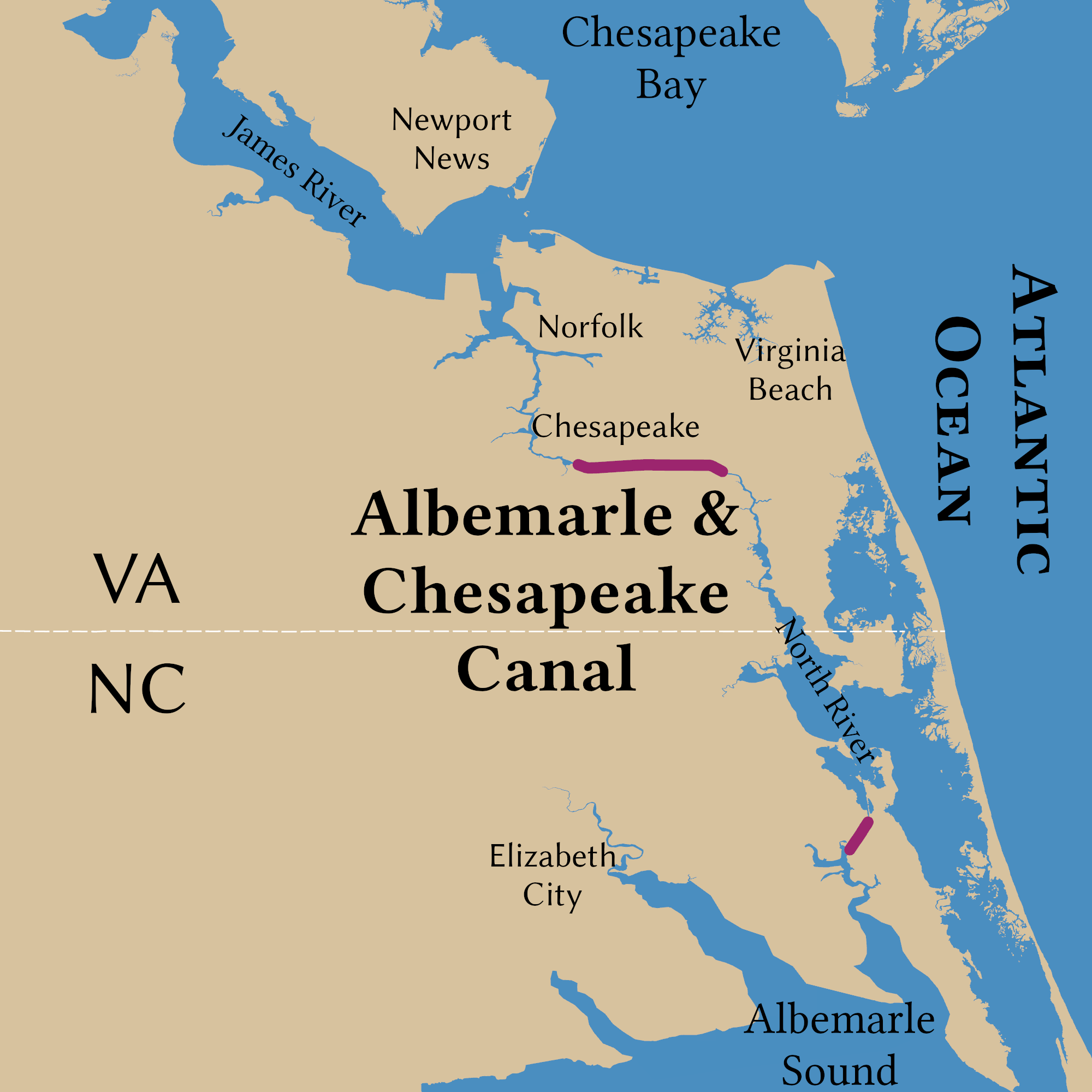
- Path of the canal
- Location: Albemarle and Chesapeake Canal, Chesapeake (Independent city), Virginia
- Coordinates: 36°43′34″N 76°6′33″W
- Area: 1,704 acres (690 ha)
- Built: 1775
- NRHP reference No.: 04000035
- VLR No.: 131-5333

Significant dates
- Added to NRHP: February 11, 2004
- Designated VLR: December 3, 2002

The Albemarle and Chesapeake Canal was built by a corporation in 1856–1860 to afford inland navigation between the Chesapeake Bay and the Albemarle Sound. It comprises two canals that are 30 miles (48 km) apart, one 8 1/2 mi (13.7 km) long between the Elizabeth River and the North Landing River in Virginia, and the other 5 1/2 mi (8.9 km) long between Currituck Sound and the North River in North Carolina.

It was listed on the National Register of Historic Places in 2003.

== Sources ==
- Dictionary of American History, by James Truslow Adams, New York: Charles Scribner's Sons, 1940
