= Little Creek (Cape Fear River tributary) =

Stream in North Carolina, US

Little Creek Tributary to Cape Fear River
- Location of Little Creek Creek mouth Little Creek (Cape Fear River tributary) (the United States)

Location
- Country: United States
- State: North Carolina
- County: Harnett County

Physical characteristics
- Source: Fish Creek divide
  - location: about 4 miles north-northeast of Mamers, North Carolina
  - coordinates: 35°27′54″N 078°53′13″W
  - elevation: 290 ft (88 m)
- Mouth: Cape Fear River
  - location: about 5 miles west-southwest of Kipling, North Carolina
  - coordinates: 35°27′54″N 078°53′13″W
  - elevation: 117 ft (36 m)
- Length: 1.61 mi (2.59 km)
- Basin size: 0.90 square miles (2.3 km^{2})
- Discharge
  - location: Cape Fear River
  - average: 1.08 cu ft/s (0.031 m^{3}/s) at mouth with Cape Fear River

Basin features
- Progression: Cape Fear River → Atlantic Ocean
- River system: Cape Fear River
- Tributaries
  - left: unnamed tributaries
  - right: unnamed tributaries
- Bridges: none

Little Creek is a 1.61 mi (2.59 km) long 1st order tributary to the Cape Fear River in Harnett County, North Carolina. This stream rises and flows entirely within Raven Rock State Park.

== Course ==
Little Creek rises about 4 miles north-northeast of Mamers, North Carolina in Raven Rock State Park and then flows northeast and east to join the Cape Fear River about 5 miles west-southwest of Kipling, North Carolina.

== Watershed ==
Little Creek drains 0.90 square miles (2.3 km^{2}) of area, receives about 46.5 in/year of precipitation, has a wetness index of 360.67 and is about 92% forested.

== See also ==
- List of rivers of North Carolina
