= Hectors Creek Township, Harnett County, North Carolina =

Township in Harnett County, North Carolina, U.S.

Coordinates: 35.4954421°N 78.8495889°W

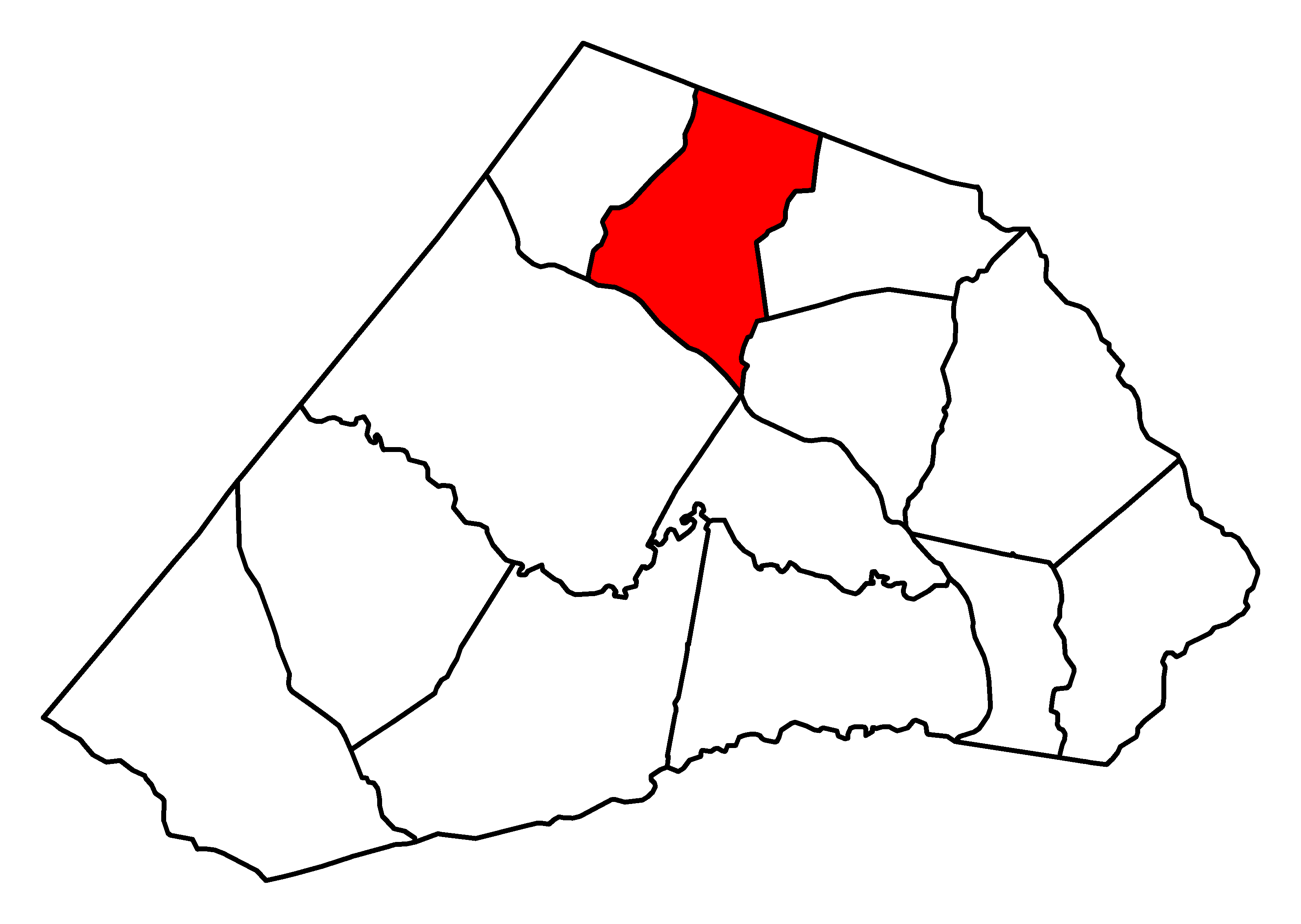
Location of Hectors Creek Township in Harnett County, N.C.

Hectors Creek Township is one of thirteen townships in Harnett County, North Carolina, United States. The township had a population of 3,629 according to the 2000 census. It is a part of the Dunn Micropolitan Area, which is also a part of the greater Raleigh–Durham–Cary Combined Statistical Area (CSA) as defined by the United States Census Bureau.

Geographically, Hectors Creek Township occupies 36.23 square miles (93.8 km^{2}) in northern Harnett County. There are no incorporated municipalities located in Hectors Creek Township, however, there are several unincorporated communities located there, including the communities of Chalybeate Springs, Kipling and Rawls. The township's northern border is with Wake County.

Hector Creek rises and joins the Cape Fear River within this township.
