= Hector Creek (Cape Fear River tributary) =

Stream in North Carolina, USA

Hector Creek Tributary to Cape Fear River
- Location of Hector Creek Creek mouth Hector Creek (Cape Fear River tributary) (the United States)

Location
- Country: United States
- State: North Carolina
- County: Harnett County; Wake

Physical characteristics
- Source: Buckhorn Creek divide
  - location: pond about 0.5 miles northeast of Duncan, North Carolina
  - coordinates: 35°33′02″N 078°50′33″W
  - elevation: 435 ft (133 m)
- Mouth: Cape Fear River
  - location: about 4 miles southwest of Kipling, North Carolina
  - coordinates: 35°26′52″N 078°51′50″W
  - elevation: 115 ft (35 m)
- Length: 10.81 mi (17.40 km)
- Basin size: 19.11 square miles (49.5 km^{2})
- Discharge
  - location: Cape Fear River
  - average: 20.46 cu ft/s (0.579 m^{3}/s) at mouth with Cape Fear River

Basin features
- Progression: Cape Fear River → Atlantic Ocean
- River system: Cape Fear River
- Tributaries
  - left: Cooper Branch
  - right: unnamed tributaries
- Bridges: NC 42, Wagstaff Road, Rock Spring Lane, Rawls Church Road, Baptist Grove Road, Kipling Road, Christian Light Road

Hector Creek is a 10.81 mi (17.40 km) long 3rd order tributary to the Cape Fear River in Harnett County, North Carolina.

== Course ==
Hector Creek rises in a pond about 0.5 miles northeast of Duncan, North Carolina in Wake County and then flows south to Harnett County to join the Cape Fear River about 4 miles southwest of Kipling, North Carolina.

== Watershed ==
Hector Creek drains 19.11 square miles (49.5 km^{2}) of area, receives about 46.6 in/year of precipitation, has a wetness index of 410.00 and is about 50% forested.

== See also ==
- List of rivers of North Carolina
