= Broadway Elementary School =

Broadway Elementary School may refer to:

- Broadway Elementary School - Venice, Los Angeles, California - List of Los Angeles Unified School District schools
- Broadway Elementary School - Broadway, North Carolina - Lee County Schools
- Broadway Elementary School - Tipp City, Ohio - Tipp City Schools
- Broadway Elementary School - Montgomery County (Spring postal address), Texas (Houston area) - Conroe Independent School District
- Broadway Elementary School - Spokane Valley, Washington - Central Valley School District
