= Avents Creek =

Stream in North Carolina, USA

Avents Creek Tributary to Cape Fear River
- Location of Avents Creek Creek mouth Avents Creek (the United States)

Location
- Country: United States
- State: North Carolina
- County: Harnett County

Physical characteristics
- Source: Buckhorn Creek divide
  - location: Pond in Duncan, North Carolina
  - coordinates: 35°32′23″N 078°53′55″W
  - elevation: 430 ft (130 m)
- Mouth: Cape Fear River
  - location: about 5 miles west of Kipling, North Carolina
  - coordinates: 35°28′28″N 078°54′42″W
  - elevation: 119 ft (36 m)
- Length: 7.60 mi (12.23 km)
- Basin size: 14.64 square miles (37.9 km^{2})
- Discharge
  - location: Cape Fear River
  - average: 16.29 cu ft/s (0.461 m^{3}/s) at mouth with Cape Fear River

Basin features
- Progression: Cape Fear River → Atlantic Ocean
- River system: Cape Fear River
- Tributaries
  - left: unnamed tributaries
  - right: Mill Creek
- Bridges: Oakridge River Road, Cokesbury Road, River Road

Avents Creek is a 7.60 mi (12.23 km) long 2nd order tributary to the Cape Fear River in Harnett County, North Carolina. This is the only stream of this name in the United States. The lower reaches flow through Raven Rock State Park.

== Course ==
Avents Creek rises in a pond in Duncan, North Carolina and then flows southwest to join the Cape Fear River about 5 miles west of Kipling, North Carolina.

== Watershed ==
Avents Creek drains 14.64 square miles (37.9 km^{2}) of area, receives about 46.9 in/year of precipitation, has a wetness index of 403.31 and is about 50% forested.

== See also ==
- List of rivers of North Carolina
