= Pemberton Creek (Cape Fear River tributary) =

Stream in North Carolina, USA

Pemberton Creek Tributary to Cape Fear River
- Location of Pemberton Creek mouth Pemberton Creek (Cape Fear River tributary) (the United States)

Location
- Country: United States
- State: North Carolina
- County: Bladen

Physical characteristics
- Source: Browns Creek divide
  - location: about 2 miles southeast of Elizabethtown, North Carolina
  - coordinates: 34°36′46″N 078°33′52″W
  - elevation: 37 ft (11 m)
- Mouth: Cape Fear River
  - location: about 3.5 miles south-southwest of White Lake, North Carolina
  - coordinates: 34°35′35″N 078°31′42″W
  - elevation: 15 ft (4.6 m)
- Length: 3.24 mi (5.21 km)
- Basin size: 1.66 square miles (4.3 km^{2})
- Discharge
  - location: Cape Fear River
  - average: 2.04 cu ft/s (0.058 m^{3}/s) at mouth with Cape Fear River

Basin features
- Progression: Cape Fear River → Atlantic Ocean
- River system: Cape Fear River
- Tributaries
  - left: unnamed tributaries
  - right: unnamed tributaries
- Bridges: none

Pemberton Creek is a 3.24 mi (5.21 km) long 1st order tributary to the Cape Fear River in Bladen County, North Carolina.

== Course ==
Pemberton Creek rises on the Browns Creek divide about 3.5 miles south-southwest of White Lake, North Carolina. Pemberton Creek then flows southeast to join the Cape Fear River about 2 miles southeast of Elizabethtown, North Carolina.

== Watershed ==
Pemberton Creek drains 1.66 square miles (4.3 km^{2}) of area, receives about 49.3 in/year of precipitation, has a wetness index of 569.34 and is about 7% forested.

== See also ==
- List of rivers of North Carolina
