= Fall Creek (Cape Fear River tributary) =

Stream in North Carolina, USA

Fall Creek Tributary to Cape Fear River
- Location of Fall Creek Creek mouth Fall Creek (Cape Fear River tributary) (the United States)

Location
- Country: United States
- State: North Carolina
- County: Lee

Physical characteristics
- Source: Patchet Creek divide
  - location: pond about 0.25 miles northwest of Broadway, North Carolina
  - coordinates: 35°28′06″N 079°03′45″W
  - elevation: 465 ft (142 m)
- Mouth: Cape Fear River
  - location: about 4 miles south of Corinth, North Carolina
  - coordinates: 35°31′54″N 078°58′55″W
  - elevation: 147 ft (45 m)
- Length: 7.98 mi (12.84 km)
- Basin size: 8.77 square miles (22.7 km^{2})
- Discharge
  - location: Cape Fear River
  - average: 10.37 cu ft/s (0.294 m^{3}/s) at mouth with Cape Fear River

Basin features
- Progression: Cape Fear River → Atlantic Ocean
- River system: Cape Fear River
- Tributaries
  - left: unnamed tributaries
  - right: unnamed tributaries
- Bridges: Salem Church Road, Copeland Road, Buckhorn Road

Fall Creek is a 7.98 mi (12.84 km) long 2nd order tributary to the Cape Fear River in Lee County, North Carolina.

== Course ==
Fall Creek rises in a pond about 0.25 miles northwest of Broadway, North Carolina and then flows northeasterly to join the Cape Fear River about 4 miles south of Corinth.

== Watershed ==
Fall Creek drains 8.77 square miles (22.7 km^{2}) of area, receives about 47.5 in/year of precipitation, has a wetness index of 392.92 and is about 57% forested.

== See also ==
- List of rivers of North Carolina
