= Georgia Branch (Cape Fear River tributary) =

Stream in North Carolina, USA

Georgia Branch Tributary to Cape Fear River
- Location of Georgia Branch mouth Georgia Branch (Cape Fear River tributary) (the United States)

Location
- Country: United States
- State: North Carolina
- County: Bladen

Physical characteristics
- Source: Burrells Bay
  - location: about 2 miles north of Tobermory, North Carolina
  - coordinates: 34°50′25″N 078°52′08″W
  - elevation: 146 ft (45 m)
- Mouth: Cape Fear River
  - location: about 2 miles east of Tobermory, North Carolina
  - coordinates: 34°48′53″N 078°49′17″W
  - elevation: 29 ft (8.8 m)
- Length: 3.65 mi (5.87 km)
- Basin size: 8.22 square miles (21.3 km^{2})
- Discharge
  - location: Cape Fear River
  - average: 9.36 cu ft/s (0.265 m^{3}/s) at mouth with Cape Fear River

Basin features
- Progression: Cape Fear River → Atlantic Ocean
- River system: Cape Fear River
- Tributaries
  - left: unnamed tributaries
  - right: Mines Creek
- Bridges: Walter Drive, Tobermory Road, NC 87, Glengerry Hill Road

Georgia Branch is a 9.65 mi (15.53 km) long 2nd order tributary to the Cape Fear River in Bladen County, North Carolina.

== Course ==
Georgia Branch rises in Burrells Bay about 2 miles north of Tobermory, North Carolina. Georgia Branch then flows southeast to join the Cape Fear River about 2 miles east of Tobermory.

== Watershed ==
Georgia Branch drains 8.22 square miles (21.3 km^{2}) of area, receives about 48.8 in/year of precipitation, has a wetness index of 590.29 and is about 21% forested.

== See also ==
- List of rivers of North Carolina
