= South River (Neuse River estuary) =

Coordinates: 34.982°N 76.587°W

The South River is a tidal estuary, approximately 8 mi (13 km) long in Carteret County, North Carolina in the United States.

It flows NNE and empties into the estuary of the Neuse River near its entrance into Pamlico Sound. The town of South River sits on western side near its mouth.

== See also ==
- List of North Carolina rivers
