= Luart, North Carolina =

Unincorporated community in North Carolina, US

Coordinates: 35°24′55″N 78°53′14″W

Luart is an unincorporated community located along old U.S. Route 421 in the Upper Little River Township of Harnett County, North Carolina, United States, situated between Mamers and the town of Lillington (Powell 1968, p. 303). It is a part of the Dunn Micropolitan Area, which is also a part of the greater Raleigh–Durham–Cary Combined Statistical Area (CSA) as defined by the United States Census Bureau.
