= Wilson Creek (Trent River tributary) =

Stream in North Carolina, USA

Wilson Creek Tributary to Trent River
- Location of Wilson Creek mouth Wilson Creek (Trent River tributary) (the United States)

Location
- Country: United States
- State: North Carolina
- County: Craven
- Town: Trent Woods

Physical characteristics
- Source: Jack Smith Creek divide
  - location: about 2 miles west of New Bern, North Carolina
  - coordinates: 35°06′38″N 077°06′15″W
  - elevation: 24 ft (7.3 m)
- Mouth: Trent River
  - location: Trent Woods, North Carolina
  - coordinates: 35°04′34″N 077°06′08″W
  - elevation: 0 ft (0 m)
- Length: 3.29 mi (5.29 km)
- Basin size: 5.83 square miles (15.1 km^{2})
- Discharge
  - location: Trent River
  - average: 8.64 cu ft/s (0.245 m^{3}/s) at mouth with Trent River

Basin features
- Progression: Trent River → Neuse River → Pamlico Sound → Atlantic Ocean
- River system: Neuse River
- Tributaries
  - left: unnamed tributaries
  - right: unnamed tributaries
- Bridges: Clubhouse Drive, Greenbrier Parkway, Yarmouth Road, Dr. Martin Luther King Boulevard, Trent Road, Trent Woods Drive

Wilson Creek is a 3.29 mi (5.29 km) long 2nd order tributary to the Trent River in Craven County, North Carolina.

== Course ==
Wilson Creek rises about 2 miles west of New Bern, North Carolina and then flows south to join the Trent River at Trent Woods.

== Watershed ==
Wilson Creek drains 5.83 square miles (15.1 km^{2}) of area, receives about 54.5 in/year of precipitation, has a wetness index of 578.57, and is about 9% forested.

== See also ==
- List of rivers of North Carolina
