= Stinking Quarter Creek =

Stream in North Carolina, U.S.

Coordinates: 36°01′01″N 79°25′26″W

Stinking Quarter Creek is a stream in the U.S. state of North Carolina. It is a tributary of Big Alamance Creek.

According to tradition, the name "Stinking Quarter" arose from the putrid stench of carrion after a buffalo hunt.

== See also ==
- List of rivers of North Carolina
