= Hares Branch =

Stream in North Carolina, USA

Hares Branch Tributary to Worrell Mill Swamp
- Location of Hares Branch mouth Hares Branch (the United States)

Location
- Country: United States
- State: North Carolina
- County: Hertford
- Town: Murfreesboro

Physical characteristics
- Source: Panther Swamp divide
  - location: about 0.5 miles south of Murfreesboro, North Carolina
  - coordinates: 36°25′32″N 077°06′55″W
  - elevation: 88 ft (27 m)
- Mouth: Worrell Millpond
  - location: Murfreesboro, North Carolina
  - coordinates: 36°26′10″N 077°05′15″W
  - elevation: 22 ft (6.7 m)
- Length: 2.85 mi (4.59 km)
- Basin size: 3.49 square miles (9.0 km^{2})
- Discharge
  - location: Worrell Millpond
  - average: 4.66 cu ft/s (0.132 m^{3}/s) at mouth with Worrell Millpond

Basin features
- Progression: generally northeast
- River system: Chowan River
- Tributaries
  - left: College Branch
  - right: unnamed tributaries
- Waterbodies: Worrell Millpond
- Bridges: US 158 (x3), Chowan College Road, NC 11

Hares Branch is a 2.85 mi (4.59 km) long 2nd order tributary to the Worrell Mill Swamp via Worrell Millpond in Hertford County, North Carolina. This is the only stream of this name in the United States.

== Course ==
Hares Branch rises on the Panther Swamp divide about 0.5 miles south of Murfreesboro, North Carolina, and then flows northeasterly to join Worrell Mill Swamp on the east side of Murfreesboro.

== Watershed ==
Hares Branch drains 3.49 square miles (9.0 km^{2}) of area, receives about 48.3 in/year of precipitation, has a wetness index of 515.21, and is about 23% forested.

== See also ==
- List of rivers of North Carolina
