= Bandeau Creek =

Stream in North Carolina, USA

Bandeau Creek Tributary to Cape Fear River
- Location of Bandeau Creek mouth Bandeau Creek (the United States)

Location
- Country: United States
- State: North Carolina
- County: Bladen

Physical characteristics
- Source: Hog Bay divide
  - location: about 0.25 miles southeast of Lagoon, North Carolina
  - coordinates: 34°33′11″N 078°25′34″W
  - elevation: 53 ft (16 m)
- Mouth: Cape Fear River
  - location: Jessups Landing on the Cape Fear River
  - coordinates: 34°32′59″N 078°26′08″W
  - elevation: 14 ft (4.3 m)
- Length: 1.10 mi (1.77 km)
- Basin size: 1.52 square miles (3.9 km^{2})
- Discharge
  - location: Cape Fear River
  - average: 1.93 cu ft/s (0.055 m^{3}/s) at mouth with Cape Fear River

Basin features
- Progression: Cape Fear River → Atlantic Ocean
- River system: Cape Fear River
- Tributaries
  - left: unnamed tributaries
  - right: unnamed tributaries
- Bridges: Phillip Wright Drive

Bandeau Creek is a 1.10 mi (1.77 km) long 1st order tributary to the Cape Fear River in Bladen County, North Carolina.

== Course ==
Bandeau Creek rises on the Hog Bay divide about 0.25 miles southeast of Lagoon, North Carolina. Bandeau Creek then flows south to join the Cape Fear River at Jessups Landing.

== Watershed ==
Bandeau Creek drains 1.52 square miles (3.9 km^{2}) of area, receives about 50.0 in/year of precipitation, has a wetness index of 577.91 and is about 21% forested.

== See also ==
- List of rivers of North Carolina
