= Caddle Creek (Ararat River tributary) =

Stream in North Carolina, US

Caddle Creek Tributary to Ararat River
- Location of Caddle Creek mouth Caddle Creek (Ararat River tributary) (the United States)

Location
- Country: United States
- State: North Carolina
- County: Surry

Physical characteristics
- Source: Fisher River divide
  - location: about 0.5 miles east of Turners Mountain
  - coordinates: 36°25′27″N 080°39′21″W
  - elevation: 1,260 ft (380 m)
- Mouth: Ararat River
  - location: about 2 miles southeast of White Plains, North Carolina
  - coordinates: 36°26′23″N 080°36′09″W
  - elevation: 930 ft (280 m)
- Length: 4.02 mi (6.47 km)
- Basin size: 3.85 square miles (10.0 km^{2})
- Discharge
  - location: Ararat River
  - average: 5.85 cu ft/s (0.166 m^{3}/s) at mouth with Ararat River

Basin features
- Progression: Ararat River → Yadkin River → Pee Dee River → Winyah Bay → Atlantic Ocean
- River system: Yadkin River
- Tributaries
  - left: unnamed tributaries
  - right: unnamed tributaries
- Bridges: Simpson Mill Road, Hickman Hollow Trail, Old Creed Road, Siloam Road

Caddle Creek is a 4.02 mi (6.47 km) long 2nd order tributary to the Ararat River in Surry County, North Carolina.

== Variant names ==
According to the Geographic Names Information System, it has also been known historically as:

- Cadel Creek
- Cadels Creek

== Course ==
Caddle Creek rises on the Fisher River divide about 0.5 miles east of Turner Mountain. Caddle Creek then flows east-northeast to join the Ararat River about 2 miles southeast of White Plains, North Carolina.

== Watershed ==
Caddle Creek drains 3.85 square miles (10.0 km^{2}) of area, receives about 47.8 in/year of precipitation, has a wetness index of 316.91, and is about 51% forested.

== See also ==
- List of rivers of North Carolina
