= Wombles Creek =

Stream in North Carolina, USA

Wombles Creek Tributary to Cape Fear River
- Location of Wombles Creek mouth Wombles Creek (the United States)

Location
- Country: United States
- State: North Carolina
- County: Lee

Physical characteristics
- Source: unnamed tributary to Deep River
  - location: about 0.5 miles southwest of Blacknel, North Carolina
  - coordinates: 35°36′39″N 079°07′18″W
  - elevation: 332 ft (101 m)
- Mouth: Cape Fear River
  - location: about 2 miles southeast of Moncure, North Carolina
  - coordinates: 35°34′59″N 079°03′05″W
  - elevation: 165 ft (50 m)
- Length: 5.04 mi (8.11 km)
- Basin size: 6.44 square miles (16.7 km^{2})
- Discharge
  - location: Cape Fear River
  - average: 7.81 cu ft/s (0.221 m^{3}/s) at mouth with Cape Fear River

Basin features
- Progression: Cape Fear River → Atlantic Ocean
- River system: Cape Fear River
- Tributaries
  - left: unnamed tributaries
  - right: unnamed tributaries
- Bridges: Goat Hill Lane, US 1, Lower Moncure Road, Lower River Road, Cape Fear Lane

Wombles Creek is a 5.04 mi (8.11 km) long 2nd order tributary to the Cape Fear River in Lee County, North Carolina. This is the only stream of this name in the United States.

== Course ==
Wombles Creek rises about 0.5 miles southwest of Blacknel, North Carolina and then flows southeast to join the Cape Fear River about 2 miles southeast of Moncure, North Carolina.

== Watershed ==
Wombles Creek drains 6.44 square miles (16.7 km^{2}) of area, receives about 47.7 in/year of precipitation, has a wetness index of 451.79 and is about 60% forested.

== See also ==
- List of rivers of North Carolina
