= Great Alamance Creek =

Stream in North Carolina, USA

Great Alamance Creek Tributary to Haw River
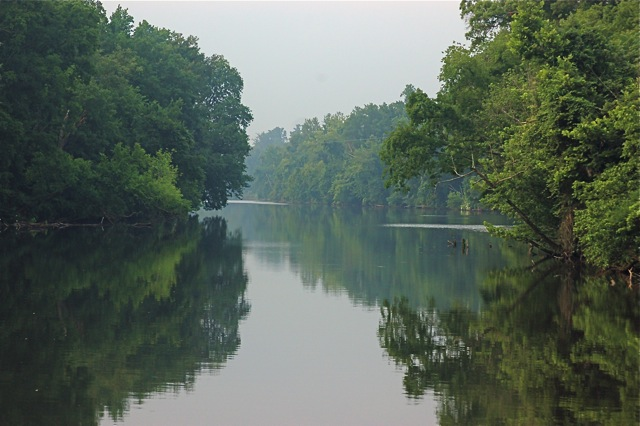
- Convergence of Great Alamance Creek and the Haw River in Swepsonville, North Carolina

- Location of Great Alamance Creek mouth Great Alamance Creek (the United States)

Location
- Country: United States
- State: North Carolina
- Counties: Alamance; Guilford

Physical characteristics
- Source: divide between Great Alamance Creek and Deep River
  - location: about 1 mile north of Pleasant Garden, North Carolina
  - coordinates: 35°58′40.49″N 079°44′57.10″W
  - elevation: 780 ft (240 m)
- Mouth: Haw River
  - location: Swepsonville, North Carolina
  - coordinates: 36°01′2.50″N 079°21′57.07″W
  - elevation: 458 ft (140 m)
- Length: 37.12 mi (59.74 km)
- Basin size: 262.23 square miles (679.2 km^{2})
- Discharge
  - location: Haw River
  - average: 268.41 cu ft/s (7.601 m^{3}/s) at mouth with Haw River

Basin features
- Progression: Haw River → Cape Fear River → Atlantic Ocean
- River system: Haw River
- Tributaries
  - left: Little Alamance Creek (Pleasant Garden Creek); Back Creek; Little Alamance Creek
  - right: Climax Creek; Stinking Quarter Creek

Great Alamance Creek, also called Big Alamance Creek, is a 37-mile long creek that is a tributary of the Haw River. The creek's headwaters are in Guilford County, but it flows primarily through Alamance County, North Carolina. It is a major source of water for the cities of Burlington and Greensboro through the Lake Mackintosh Reservoir. It was called "Alamance" after an old local Native American word used to describe the blue-colored mud in the bottom of the creek.

The creek was a part of the site of the Battle of Alamance, fought in 1771 between the colonial militia under the command of Governor William Tryon. When Alamance County was formed from Orange County in 1849, it was named for this battle and creek.

Great Alamance Creek has a tributary that is also called "Alamance Creek" - Little Alamance Creek, which is actually a little longer than Great Alamance Creek at over 12 miles, much of it in Burlington. However, it has less water flow than Great Alamance Creek. Little Alamance Creek flows through City Park in Burlington.

== Variant names ==
According to the Geographic Names Information System, it has also been known historically as:

- Alamance Creek
- Aramanchy River (In the 1751 Fry-Jefferson map, the "m" is obscured at the fold.)
- Aramancy River
- Big Alamance Creek

== See also ==
- List of rivers of North Carolina
