= Bush Creek (Cape Fear River tributary) =

Stream in North Carolina, USA

Bush Creek Tributary to Cape Fear River
- Location of Bush Creek Creek mouth Bush Creek (Cape Fear River tributary) (the United States)

Location
- Country: United States
- State: North Carolina
- County: Lee

Physical characteristics
- Source: Fall Creek divide
  - location: about 4 miles northeast of Sanford, North Carolina
  - coordinates: 35°30′01″N 079°02′28″W
  - elevation: 298 ft (91 m)
- Mouth: Cape Fear River
  - location: about 1 mile southeast of Brickhaven, North Carolina
  - coordinates: 35°32′32″N 079°00′36″W
  - elevation: 151 ft (46 m)
- Length: 4.00 mi (6.44 km)
- Basin size: 7.25 square miles (18.8 km^{2})
- Discharge
  - location: Cape Fear River
  - average: 7.54 cu ft/s (0.214 m^{3}/s) at mouth with Cape Fear River

Basin features
- Progression: Cape Fear River → Atlantic Ocean
- River system: Cape Fear River
- Tributaries
  - left: unnamed tributaries
  - right: unnamed tributaries
- Bridges: none

Bush Creek is a 4.00 mi (6.44 km) long 2nd order tributary to the Cape Fear River in Lee County, North Carolina.

== Course ==
Bush Creek rises about 4 miles northeast of Sanford, North Carolina and then flows northeasterly to join the Cape Fear River about 1 mile southeast of Brickhaven, North Carolina.

== Watershed ==
Bush Creek drains 7.25 square miles (18.8 km^{2}) of area, receives about 47.6 in/year of precipitation, has a wetness index of 407.09 and is about 60% forested.

== See also ==
- List of rivers of North Carolina
