= Rawls, North Carolina =

Unincorporated community in North Carolina, US

Coordinates: 35°32′14″N 78°48′55″W

Rawls is an unincorporated community located in the Hector's Creek Township of Harnett County, North Carolina, United States.
