= Cross Creek (Cape Fear River tributary) =

Stream in North Carolina, USA

Cross Creek Tributary to Cape Fear River
- Location of Cross Creek mouth Cross Creek (Cape Fear River tributary) (the United States)

Location
- Country: United States
- State: North Carolina
- County: Cumberland
- City: Fayetteville

Physical characteristics
- Source: Little Cross Creek divide
  - location: pond in Fort Bragg on west side of Fayetteville, North Carolina
  - coordinates: 35°07′52″N 078°56′33″W
  - elevation: 190 ft (58 m)
- Mouth: Cape Fear River
  - location: east side of Fayetteville, North Carolina
  - coordinates: 35°03′04″N 078°51′25″W
  - elevation: 48 ft (15 m)
- Length: 9.70 mi (15.61 km)
- Basin size: 40.09 square miles (103.8 km^{2})
- Discharge
  - location: Cape Fear River
  - average: 39.75 cu ft/s (1.126 m^{3}/s) at mouth with Cape Fear River

Basin features
- Progression: Cape Fear River → Atlantic Ocean
- River system: Cape Fear River
- Tributaries
  - left: unnamed tributaries
  - right: Little Cross Creek; Blounts Creek
- Waterbodies: Rose Lake
- Bridges: NC 295, Shaw Mill Road, Country Club Drive, Langdon Street, Murchison Road, Blue Street, US 401, NC 24, Bragg Boulevard, Hillsboro Street, Ray Avenue, Green Street, Ann Street, N Cool Spring Street, NC 210, I-95-US 301

Cross Creek is a 9.70 mi (15.61 km) long 4th order tributary to the Cape Fear River in Cumberland County, North Carolina.

== Variant names ==
According to the Geographic Names Information System, it has also been known historically as:

- Crosscreek
- Fayetteville

== Course ==
Cross Creek rises on the west side of Fayetteville, North Carolina in Fort Bragg. Cross Creek then flows southeast through Fayetteville to join the Cape Fear River on the east side of Fayetteville.

== Watershed ==
Cross Creek drains 40.09 square miles (103.8 km^{2}) of area, receives about 47.2 in/year of precipitation, has a wetness index of 489.33 and is about 20% forested.

== See also ==
- List of rivers of North Carolina
