= Worrell Mill Swamp =

Stream in North Carolina, USA

Worrell Mill Swamp Tributary to Meherrin River
- Location of Worrell Mill Swamp mouth Worrell Mill Swamp (the United States)

Location
- Country: United States
- State: North Carolina
- County: Hertford
- Town: Murfreesboro

Physical characteristics
- Source: Worrell Millpond
  - location: Murfreesboro, North Carolina
  - coordinates: 36°26′26″N 077°05′00″W
  - elevation: 5 ft (1.5 m)
- Mouth: Meherrin River
  - location: Murfreesboro, North Carolina
  - coordinates: 36°26′49″N 077°04′28″W
  - elevation: 0 ft (0 m)
- Length: 0.69 mi (1.11 km)
- Basin size: 4.02 square miles (10.4 km^{2})
- Discharge
  - location: Meherrin River
  - average: 5.34 cu ft/s (0.151 m^{3}/s) at mouth with Meherrin River

Basin features
- Progression: Meherrin River → Chowan River → Albemarle Sound
- River system: Chowan River
- Tributaries
  - left: Hares Branch
  - right: unnamed tributaries
- Waterbodies: Worrell Millpond
- Bridges: US 158

Worrell Mill Swamp is a 0.69 mi (1.11 km) long 2nd order tributary to the Meherrin River in Hertford County, North Carolina. This is the only stream of this name in the United States.

== Course ==
Worrell Mill Swamp begins at the dam of Worrell Millpond in Murfreesboro, North Carolina, and then flows northeast to join the Meherrin River on the northeast side of Murfreesboro.

== Watershed ==
Worrell Mill Swamp drains 4.02 square miles (10.4 km^{2}) of area, receives about 48.3 in/year of precipitation, has a wetness index of 509.68, and is about 28% forested.

== See also ==
- List of rivers of North Carolina
