= Harrison Creek (Cape Fear River tributary) =

Stream in North Carolina, USA

Harrison Creek Tributary to Cape Fear River
- Location of Harrison Creek mouth Harrison Creek (Cape Fear River tributary) (the United States)

Location
- Country: United States
- State: North Carolina
- County: Bladen; Cumberland

Physical characteristics
- Source: Harrison Creek Bay
  - location: about 5 miles southeast of Cedar Creek, North Carolina
  - coordinates: 34°54′40″N 078°41′55″W
  - elevation: 110 ft (34 m)
- Mouth: Cape Fear River
  - location: about 1.5 miles south of Burney, North Carolina
  - coordinates: 34°42′41″N 078°42′52″W
  - elevation: 25 ft (7.6 m)
- Length: 12.84 mi (20.66 km)
- Basin size: 50.36 square miles (130.4 km^{2})
- Discharge
  - location: Cape Fear River
  - average: 52.94 cu ft/s (1.499 m^{3}/s) at mouth with Cape Fear River

Basin features
- Progression: Cape Fear River → Atlantic Ocean
- River system: Cape Fear River
- Tributaries
  - left: Indian Creek
  - right: unnamed tributaries
- Bridges: Troy Fisher Road, Cedar Creek Road, Johnson Road, Privateer Farm Road, Camp Bowers Trail, River Road, Burney Road

Harrison Creek is a 12.84 mi (20.66 km) long 2nd order tributary to the Cape Fear River in Bladen County, North Carolina.

== Course ==
Harrison Creek rises in Harrison Creek Bay, a Carolina Bay, about 5 miles southeast of Cedar Creek, North Carolina in Cumberland County. Harrison Creek then flows south into Bladen County to join the Cape Fear River about 1.5 miles south of Burney, North Carolina. The course of Harrison Creek is hard to determine in swamps and with channelization of the stream.

== Watershed ==
Harrison Creek drains 50.36 square miles (130.4 km^{2}) of area, receives about 48.7 in/year of precipitation, has a wetness index of 620.10 and is about 17% forested.

== See also ==
- List of rivers of North Carolina
