= Hammonds Creek =

Stream in North Carolina, USA

Hammonds Creek Tributary to Cape Fear River
- Location of Hammonds Creek mouth Hammonds Creek (the United States)

Location
- Country: United States
- State: North Carolina
- County: Bladen

Physical characteristics
- Source: Whites Creek divide
  - location: about 3 miles south of Elizabethtown, North Carolina
  - coordinates: 34°35′36″N 078°38′27″W
  - elevation: 112 ft (34 m)
- Mouth: Cape Fear River
  - location: about 0.25 miles south of Atkinson Landing on the Cape Fear River
  - coordinates: 34°34′23″N 078°23′37″W
  - elevation: 14 ft (4.3 m)
- Length: 11.05 mi (17.78 km)
- Basin size: 35.44 square miles (91.8 km^{2})
- Discharge
  - location: Cape Fear River
  - average: 39.27 cu ft/s (1.112 m^{3}/s) at mouth with Cape Fear River

Basin features
- Progression: Cape Fear River → Atlantic Ocean
- River system: Cape Fear River
- Tributaries
  - left: Bog Branch; Plum Branch; Broad Branch
  - right: Upton Creek; Whites Creek
- Bridges: Fontana Lane, Manor Ridge Drive, Mercer Mill Brown Marsh Road, Coley Road, Airport Road, NC 87

Hammonds Creek is a 11.05 mi (17.78 km) long 3rd order tributary to the Cape Fear River in Bladen County, North Carolina.

== Variant names ==
According to the Geographic Names Information System, it has also been known historically as:

- Hammond Creek

== Course ==
Hammonds Creek rises on the Whites Creek divide about 3 miles south of Elizabethtown, North Carolina. Hammonds Creek then flows east to join the Cape Fear River about 0.25 miles south of Atkinson Landing.

== Watershed ==
Hammonds Creek drains 35.44 square miles (91.8 km^{2}) of area, receives about 49.5 in/year of precipitation, has a wetness index of 514.36 and is about 31% forested.

== See also ==
- List of rivers of North Carolina
