= Ellis Creek (Cape Fear River tributary) =

Stream in North Carolina, USA

Ellis Creek Tributary to Cape Fear River
- Location of Ellis Creek mouth Ellis Creek (Cape Fear River tributary) (the United States)

Location
- Country: United States
- State: North Carolina
- County: Bladen

Physical characteristics
- Source: Suggs Mill Pond
  - location: about 5 miles west of Ammon, North Carolina
  - coordinates: 34°47′56″N 078°39′00″W
  - elevation: 95 ft (29 m)
- Mouth: Cape Fear River
  - location: about 1 mile south of Yorick, North Carolina
  - coordinates: 34°39′17″N 078°38′31″W
  - elevation: 24 ft (7.3 m)
- Length: 11.76 mi (18.93 km)
- Basin size: 52.26 square miles (135.4 km^{2})
- Discharge
  - location: Cape Fear River
  - average: 55.15 cu ft/s (1.562 m^{3}/s) at mouth with Cape Fear River

Basin features
- Progression: Cape Fear River → Atlantic Ocean
- River system: Cape Fear River
- Tributaries
  - left: unnamed tributaries
  - right: Lake Run
- Bridges: Opportunity Lane, Dowd Dairy Road, Gum Shaw Road, NC 53

Ellis Creek is an 11.76 mi (18.93 km)-long 2nd-order tributary to the Cape Fear River in Bladen County, North Carolina.

== Course ==
Ellis Creek rises in Suggs Mill Pond, one of the Carolina bays, about 5 miles west of Ammon, North Carolina in Bladen County. Ellis Creek then flows south-southeast to join the Cape Fear River about 1 mile south of Yorick, North Carolina.

== Watershed ==
Ellis Creek drains 52.26 square miles (135.4 km^{2}) of area, receives about 49 inches per year of precipitation, has a wetness index of 610.62, and is about 19% forested.

== See also ==
- List of rivers of North Carolina
