= Phillips Creek (Cape Fear River tributary) =

Stream in North Carolina, USA

Phillips Creek Tributary to Cape Fear River
- Location of Phillips Creek mouth Phillips Creek (Cape Fear River tributary) (the United States)

Location
- Country: United States
- State: North Carolina
- County: Bladen

Physical characteristics
- Source: Bakers Lake
  - location: about 5 miles northeast of Newlight, North Carolina
  - coordinates: 34°48′25″N 078°45′55″W
  - elevation: 90 ft (27 m)
- Mouth: Cape Fear River
  - location: about 1 mile east-northeast of Tarheel, North Carolina
  - coordinates: 34°43′52″N 078°45′34″W
  - elevation: 28 ft (8.5 m)
- Length: 7.07 mi (11.38 km)
- Basin size: 10.37 square miles (26.9 km^{2})
- Discharge
  - location: Cape Fear River
  - average: 11.60 cu ft/s (0.328 m^{3}/s) at mouth with Cape Fear River

Basin features
- Progression: Cape Fear River → Atlantic Ocean
- River system: Cape Fear River
- Tributaries
  - left: unnamed tributaries
  - right: unnamed tributaries
- Bridges: Burney Road, Tarheel Ferry Road, River Road

Phillips Creek is a 7.07 mi (11.38 km) long 2nd order tributary to the Cape Fear River in Bladen County, North Carolina.

== Course ==
Phillips Creek rises in Bakers Lake about 5 miles northeast of Newlight, North Carolina. Phillips Creek then flows south to join the Cape Fear River about 1 miles east of Tarheel, North Carolina.

== Watershed ==
Phillips Creek drains 10.37 square miles (26.9 km^{2}) of area, receives about 48.9 in/year of precipitation, has a wetness index of 575.45 and is about 30% forested.

== See also ==
- List of rivers of North Carolina
