= Willis Creek (Cape Fear River tributary) =

Stream in North Carolina, USA

Willis Creek Tributary of Cape Fear River
- Location of Willis Creek mouth Willis Creek (Cape Fear River tributary) (the United States)

Location
- Country: United States
- State: North Carolina
- County: Cumberland

Physical characteristics
- Source: confluence of Swans Creek and Kirks Mill Creek
  - location: about 5 miles northeast of Tobermory, North Carolina
  - coordinates: 34°51′31″N 78°51′03″W
  - elevation: 80 ft (24 m)
- Mouth: Cape Fear River
  - location: about 1.5 miles southwest of Elease, North Carolina
  - coordinates: 34°51′05″N 78°49′38″W
  - elevation: 33 ft (10 m)
- Length: 1.42 mi (2.29 km)
- Basin size: 13.53 square miles (35.0 km^{2})
- Discharge
  - location: Cape Fear River
  - average: 15.07 cu ft/s (0.427 m^{3}/s) at mouth with Cape Fear River

Basin features
- Progression: Cape Fear River → Atlantic Ocean
- River system: Cape Fear River
- Tributaries
  - left: Swans Creek
  - right: Kirks Mill Creek

Willis Creek is a 1.42-mile-long (2.29 km) second-order tributary of the Cape Fear River in Cumberland County, North Carolina.

== Course ==
Willis Creek is formed by the junction of Swans Creek and Kirks Mill Creek near North Carolina Highway 87 northeast of St. Pauls, North Carolina. Cross Creek then flows eastward to join the Cape Fear River near the border between Cumberland County and Bladen County.

== Watershed ==
Willis Creek drains 13.53 square miles (35.0 km^{2}) of area, receives about 48.7 in/year of precipitation, has a wetness index of 560.85 and is about 19% forested.

== See also ==
- List of rivers of North Carolina
