= Parkers Creek (Cape Fear River tributary) =

Stream in North Carolina, USA

Parkers Creek Tributary to Cape Fear River
- Location of Parkers Creek Creek mouth Parkers Creek (Cape Fear River tributary) (the United States)

Location
- Country: United States
- State: North Carolina
- County: Harnett County

Physical characteristics
- Source: Buckhorn Creek divide
  - location: Pond at Duncan, North Carolina
  - coordinates: 35°33′40″N 078°52′31″W
  - elevation: 435 ft (133 m)
- Mouth: Cape Fear River
  - location: about 3 miles west of Cokesbury, North Carolina
  - coordinates: 35°31′11″N 078°58′01″W
  - elevation: 142 ft (43 m)
- Length: 7.13 mi (11.47 km)
- Basin size: 9.31 square miles (24.1 km^{2})
- Discharge
  - location: Cape Fear River
  - average: 10.83 cu ft/s (0.307 m^{3}/s) at mouth with Cape Fear River

Basin features
- Progression: Cape Fear River → Atlantic Ocean
- River system: Cape Fear River
- Tributaries
  - left: unnamed tributaries
  - right: unnamed tributaries
- Bridges: Cokesbury Park Lane, Wade Stephenson Road, Ball Road

Parkers Creek is a 7.13 mi (11.47 km) long 3rd order tributary to the Cape Fear River in Harnett County, North Carolina.

== Course ==
Parkers Creek rises in a pond at Duncan, North Carolina and then flows southwest to join the Cape Fear River about 3 miles west of Cokesbury, North Carolina.

== Watershed ==
Parkers Creek drains 9.31 square miles (24.1 km^{2}) of area, receives about 47.2 in/year of precipitation, has a wetness index of 376.70 and is about 66% forested.

== See also ==
- List of rivers of North Carolina
