= Mulford Creek (Cape Fear River tributary) =

Stream in North Carolina, USA

Mulford Creek Tributary to Cape Fear River
- Location of Mulford Creek mouth Mulford Creek (Cape Fear River tributary) (the United States)

Location
- Country: United States
- State: North Carolina
- County: Bladen

Physical characteristics
- Source: Mulford Bay divide
  - location: about 3 miles south-southwest of White Lake, North Carolina
  - coordinates: 34°36′15″N 078°29′46″W
  - elevation: 57 ft (17 m)
- Mouth: Cape Fear River
  - location: about 3 miles south of White Lake, North Carolina
  - coordinates: 34°35′41″N 078°31′25″W
  - elevation: 15 ft (4.6 m)
- Length: 1.47 mi (2.37 km)
- Basin size: 3.72 square miles (9.6 km^{2})
- Discharge
  - location: Cape Fear River
  - average: 4.45 cu ft/s (0.126 m^{3}/s) at mouth with Cape Fear River

Basin features
- Progression: Cape Fear River → Atlantic Ocean
- River system: Cape Fear River
- Tributaries
  - left: unnamed tributaries
  - right: unnamed tributaries
- Bridges: none

Mulford Creek is a 1.47 mi (2.37 km) long 1st order tributary to the Cape Fear River in Bladen County, North Carolina.

== Course ==
Mulford Creek rises on the Mulford Bay divide about 3 miles south-southwest of White Lake, North Carolina. Mulford Creek then flows southwest to join the Cape Fear River about 3 miles south of White Lake.

== Watershed ==
Mulford Creek drains 3.72 square miles (9.6 km^{2}) of area, receives about 49.5 in/year of precipitation, has a wetness index of 603.54 and is about 20% forested.

== See also ==
- List of rivers of North Carolina
