= Turnbull Creek (Cape Fear River tributary) =

Stream in North Carolina, USA

Turnbull Creek Tributary to Cape Fear River
- Location of Turnbull Creek mouth Turnbull Creek (Cape Fear River tributary) (the United States)

Location
- Country: United States
- State: North Carolina
- County: Bladen; Cumberland

Physical characteristics
- Source: between Bushy Lake and Rollins Pond
  - location: about 5 miles west-southwest of Roseboro, North Carolina
  - coordinates: 34°54′19″N 078°41′10″W
  - elevation: 110 ft (34 m)
- Mouth: Cape Fear River
  - location: about 1.5 miles east of Elizabethtown, North Carolina
  - coordinates: 34°37′29″N 078°33′24″W
  - elevation: 23 ft (7.0 m)
- Length: 27.78 mi (44.71 km)
- Basin size: 88.27 square miles (228.6 km^{2})
- Discharge
  - location: Cape Fear River
  - average: 91.99 cu ft/s (2.605 m^{3}/s) at mouth with Cape Fear River

Basin features
- Progression: Cape Fear River → Atlantic Ocean
- River system: Cape Fear River
- Tributaries
  - left: Little Turnbull Creek; Indian Creek; White Lake Drain; Tubmill Creek
  - right: Briary Stream; Spring Branch; Panther Branch; Smith Swamp
- Bridges: Turnbull Road, Squatting Bear Drive, Avery Road, Walter West Road, Braxton Edge Road, NC 242, Lula Long Road, Johnsontown Road, Sweet Home Church Road, Old Hoover Bridge Road, US 701-NC 41

Turnbull Creek is a 27.78 mi (44.71 km) long 3rd order tributary to the Cape Fear River in Bladen County, North Carolina.

== Course ==
Turnbull Creek rises in between Bushy Lake and Rollins Pond, a Carolina Bay, about 5 miles east of Roseboro, North Carolina in Cumberland County. Turnbull Creek then flows southeast to Bladen County to join the Cape Fear River about 1.5 miles east of Elizabethtown, North Carolina.

== Watershed ==
Turnbull Creek drains 88.27 square miles (228.6 km^{2}) of area, receives about 49.1 in/year of precipitation, has a wetness index of 617.26 and is about 23% forested.

== See also ==
- List of rivers of North Carolina
