= Hoods Creek (Trent River tributary) =

Stream in North Carolina, USA

Hoods Creek Tributary to Trent River
- Location of Hoods Creek mouth Hoods Creek (Trent River tributary) (the United States)

Location
- Country: United States
- State: North Carolina
- County: Craven

Physical characteristics
- Source: Georges Branch divide
  - location: about 1.5 miles southwest of James City, North Carolina
  - coordinates: 35°03′17″N 077°04′44″W
  - elevation: 15 ft (4.6 m)
- Mouth: Trent River
  - location: Timothy Chapel, North Carolina
  - coordinates: 35°04′06″N 077°04′39″W
  - elevation: 0 ft (0 m)
- Length: 1.02 mi (1.64 km)
- Basin size: 1.03 square miles (2.7 km^{2})
- Discharge
  - location: Trent River
  - average: 1.68 cu ft/s (0.048 m^{3}/s) at mouth with Trent River

Basin features
- Progression: Trent River → Neuse River → Pamlico Sound → Atlantic Ocean
- River system: Neuse River
- Tributaries
  - left: unnamed tributaries
  - right: unnamed tributaries
- Bridges: Brices Creek Road

Hoods Creek is a 1.02 mi (1.64 km) long 1st order tributary to the Trent River in Craven County, North Carolina.

== Course ==
Hoods Creek rises at Timothy Chapel, North Carolina and then flows north to join the Trent River about 1.5 miles southwest of James City.

== Watershed ==
Hoods Creek drains 1.03 square miles (2.7 km^{2}) of area, receives about 55.1 in/year of precipitation, has a wetness index of 556.52, and is about 7% forested.

== See also ==
- List of rivers of North Carolina
