= Grays Creek (Cape Fear River tributary) =

Stream in North Carolina, USA

Grays Creek Tributary to Cape Fear River
- Location of Grays Creek mouth Grays Creek (Cape Fear River tributary) (the United States)

Location
- Country: United States
- State: North Carolina
- County: Cumberland

Physical characteristics
- Source: Rockfish Creek divide
  - location: Roslin, North Carolina
  - coordinates: 34°55′53″N 078°56′11″W
  - elevation: 170 ft (52 m)
- Mouth: Cape Fear River
  - location: about 1 mile southwest of Lena, North Carolina
  - coordinates: 34°53′34″N 078°49′01″W
  - elevation: 41 ft (12 m)
- Length: 9.00 mi (14.48 km)
- Basin size: 13.07 square miles (33.9 km^{2})
- Discharge
  - location: Cape Fear River
  - average: 39.75 cu ft/s (1.126 m^{3}/s) at mouth with Cape Fear River

Basin features
- Progression: Cape Fear River → Atlantic Ocean
- River system: Cape Fear River
- Tributaries
  - left: unnamed tributaries
  - right: unnamed tributaries
- Waterbodies: Rainey Pond
- Bridges: Cypress Lakes Road, NC 87, Blossum Road

Grays Creek is a 9.00-mile-long (14.48 km) 2nd order tributary to the Cape Fear River in Cumberland County, North Carolina.

== Course ==
Grays Creek rises in Roslin, North Carolina and then flows in a southeasterly direction to join the Cape Fear River about 1 mile southwest of Lena, North Carolina.

== Watershed ==
Grays Creek drains 13.07 square miles (33.9 km^{2}) of area, receives about 48.3 in/year of precipitation, has a wetness index of 559.06 and is about 15% forested.

== See also ==
- List of rivers of North Carolina
