= Rough Butt Creek =

Stream in North Carolina, USA

Rough Butt Creek Tributary to Caney Fork
- Location of Rough Butt Creek mouth Rough Butt Creek (the United States)

Location
- Country: United States
- State: North Carolina
- County: Jackson

Physical characteristics
- Source: divide between Rough Butt Creek and Wolf Creek
  - location: about 0.5 miles southwest of Rough Butt Bald
  - coordinates: 35°18′42″N 082°58′27″W
  - elevation: 4,900 ft (1,500 m)
- Mouth: Caney Fork
  - location: about 2 miles east-northeast of Rich Mountain, North Carolina
  - coordinates: 35°19′29″N 082°01′36″W
  - elevation: 2,930 ft (890 m)
- Length: 3.31 mi (5.33 km)
- Basin size: 3.51 square miles (9.1 km^{2})
- Discharge
  - location: Caney Fork
  - average: 11.89 cu ft/s (0.337 m^{3}/s) at mouth with Caney Fork

Basin features
- Progression: west-northwest
- River system: Tuckasegee
- Tributaries
  - left: unnamed tributaries
  - right: unnamed tributaries

Rough Butt Creek is a stream in Jackson County, North Carolina, in the United States. It is located within the Nantahala National Forest.

A hiking trail along Rough Butt Creek leads to a 35-foot (11 m) waterfall.

== See also ==
- List of rivers of North Carolina
