= Brice Creek (Trent River tributary) =

Stream in North Carolina, USA

Brice Creek Tributary to Trent River
- Location of Brice Creek mouth Brice Creek (Trent River tributary) (the United States)

Location
- Country: United States
- State: North Carolina
- County: Craven

Physical characteristics
- Source: confluence of West Prong and East Prong Brice Creek
  - location: about 0.5 miles southwest of James City, North Carolina
  - coordinates: 34°58′57″N 077°00′01″W
  - elevation: 35 ft (11 m)
- Mouth: Trent River
  - location: about 6 miles northwest of Havelock, North Carolina
  - coordinates: 35°04′34″N 077°03′31″W
  - elevation: 0 ft (0 m)
- Length: 12.27 mi (19.75 km)
- Basin size: 68.14 square miles (176.5 km^{2})
- Discharge
  - location: Trent River
  - average: 97.17 cu ft/s (2.752 m^{3}/s) at mouth with Trent River

Basin features
- Progression: Trent River → Neuse River → Pamlico Sound → Atlantic Ocean
- River system: Neuse River
- Tributaries
  - left: West Prong Brice Creek; Black Branch; Georges Branch
  - right: East Prong Brice Creek; Great Branch; Lees Branch
- Bridges: Old Airport Road, Brices Creek Road

Brice Creek is a 12.23 mi (19.68 km) long 3rd order tributary to the Trent River in Craven County, North Carolina.

== Course ==
Brice Creek is formed at the confluence of East Prong and West Prong Brice Creek about 6 miles northwest of Havelock, North Carolina and then flows north-northwest to join the Trent River about 0.5 miles southwest of James City.

== Watershed ==
Brice Creek drains 68.14 square miles (176.5 km^{2}) of area, receives about 55.6 in/year of precipitation, has a wetness index of 631.01, and is about 23% forested.

== See also ==
- List of rivers of North Carolina
