= Potecasi Creek =

Stream in North Carolina, USA

Potecasi Creek Tributary to Meherrin River
- Location of Potecasi Creek mouth Potecasi Creek (the United States)

Location
- Country: United States
- State: North Carolina
- County: Hertford; Northampton

Physical characteristics
- Source: confluence of Ramsey Creek and Wiccacanee Swamp
  - location: about 2 miles east of Jackson, North Carolina
  - coordinates: 36°23′26″N 077°20′47″W
  - elevation: 65 ft (20 m)
- Mouth: Meherrin River
  - location: Parkers Ferry on Meherrin River
  - coordinates: 36°26′11″N 076°57′24″W
  - elevation: 0 ft (0 m)
- Length: 41.28 mi (66.43 km)
- Basin size: 41.28 square miles (106.9 km^{2})
- Discharge
  - location: Meherrin River
  - average: 263.69 cu ft/s (7.467 m^{3}/s) at mouth with Meherrin River

Basin features
- Progression: Meherrin River → Chowan River → Albemarle Sound
- River system: Chowan River
- Tributaries
  - left: Wildcat Swamp; Paddys Delight Creek; Panther Swamp; Old Tree Swamp; Bells Branch
  - right: Urabaw Swamp; Cutawhiskie Creek; Mill Branch
- Bridges: Creeksville Road, NC 35, US 258, Benthall Bridge Road, NC 11, US 158

Potecasi Creek is a 41.28 mi (66.43 km) long 4th order tributary to the Meherrin River in Hertford County, North Carolina. This is the only stream of this name in the United States.

== Variant names ==
According to the Geographic Names Information System, it has also been known historically as:

- Catawhisky Creek
- Meherrin Creek

== Course ==
Potecasi Creek begins at the confluence of Ramsey Creek and Wiccacanee Swamp in Northampton County, North Carolina about 2 miles east of Jackson, and then flows easterly into Hertford County to join the Meherrin River at Parkers Ferry.

== Watershed ==
Potecasi Creek drains 257.42 square miles (666.7 km^{2}) of area, receives about 47.3 in/year of precipitation, has a wetness index of 592.69, and is about 29% forested.

== See also ==
- List of rivers of North Carolina
