= Donoho Creek =

Stream in North Carolina, USA

Donoho Creek Tributary to Cape Fear River
- Location of Donoho Creek mouth Donoho Creek (the United States)

Location
- Country: United States
- State: North Carolina
- County: Bladen

Physical characteristics
- Source: Carvers Creek divide
  - location: about 1 mile northwest of Westbrook, North Carolina
  - coordinates: 34°29′23″N 078°27′00″W
  - elevation: 90 ft (27 m)
- Mouth: Cape Fear River
  - location: about 0.25 miles northeast of Westbrook, North Carolina
  - coordinates: 34°28′52″N 078°24′48″W
  - elevation: 13 ft (4.0 m)
- Length: 2.20 mi (3.54 km)
- Basin size: 2.04 square miles (5.3 km^{2})
- Discharge
  - location: Cape Fear River
  - average: 2.65 cu ft/s (0.075 m^{3}/s) at mouth with Cape Fear River

Basin features
- Progression: Cape Fear River → Atlantic Ocean
- River system: Cape Fear River
- Tributaries
  - left: unnamed tributaries
  - right: unnamed tributaries
- Bridges: NC 87, N Braddy Plantation Road

Donoho Creek is a 2.20 mi (3.54 km) long 1st order tributary to the Cape Fear River in Bladen County, North Carolina. This is the only stream of this name in the United States.

== Course ==
Donoho Creek rises on the Carvers Creek divide about 1 mile northwest of Westbrook, North Carolina. Donoho Creek then flows southeast to join the Cape Fear River about 0.25 miles northeast of Westbrook.

== Watershed ==
Donoho Creek drains 2.04 square miles (5.3 km^{2}) of area, receives about 50.3 in/year of precipitation, has a wetness index of 552.49 and is about 20% forested.

== See also ==
- List of rivers of North Carolina
