= Little Shaddox Creek =

Stream in North Carolina, USA

Little Shaddox Creek Tributary to Cape Fear River
- Location of Little Shaddox Creek mouth Little Shaddox Creek (the United States)

Location
- Country: United States
- State: North Carolina
- County: Lee

Physical characteristics
- Source: Hughes Creek divide
  - location: about 3 miles south-southeast of Blacknel, North Carolina
  - coordinates: 35°34′59″N 079°05′25″W
  - elevation: 198 ft (60 m)
- Mouth: Cape Fear River
  - location: about 3 miles south of Moncure, North Carolina
  - coordinates: 35°34′29″N 079°02′51″W
  - elevation: 155 ft (47 m)
- Length: 3.10 mi (4.99 km)
- Basin size: 1.98 square miles (5.1 km^{2})
- Discharge
  - location: Cape Fear River
  - average: 2.50 cu ft/s (0.071 m^{3}/s) at mouth with Cape Fear River

Basin features
- Progression: Cape Fear River → Atlantic Ocean
- River system: Cape Fear River
- Tributaries
  - left: unnamed tributaries
  - right: unnamed tributaries
- Bridges: Lower Moncure Road, Lower River Road

Little Shaddox Creek is a 3.10 mi (4.99 km) long 1st order tributary to the Cape Fear River in Lee County, North Carolina. This is the only stream of this name in the United States.

== Course ==
Little Shaddox Creek rises about 3 miles south-southwest of Blacknel, North Carolina and then flows easterly to join the Cape Fear River about 3 miles south of Moncure, North Carolina.

== Watershed ==
Little Shaddox Creek drains 1.98 square miles (5.1 km^{2}) of area, receives about 47.7 in/year of precipitation, has a wetness index of 526.18 and is about 59% forested.

== See also ==
- List of rivers of North Carolina
