= Adams Branch (Richardson Creek tributary) =

Stream in North Carolina, USA

Adams Branch Tributary to Richardson Creek
- Location of Adams Branch mouth

Location
- Country: United States
- State: North Carolina
- Counties: Union

Physical characteristics
- Source: divide between Adams Branch and Lynches River
  - location: Pond about 1.5 miles southwest of Alton, North Carolina
  - coordinates: 34°53′01″N 080°35′26″W
  - elevation: 698 ft (213 m)
- Mouth: Richardson Creek
  - location: about 3 miles north-northwest of Alton, North Carolina
  - coordinates: 34°55′34″N 080°33′29″W
  - elevation: 528 ft (161 m)
- Length: 4.64 mi (7.47 km)
- Basin size: 6.11 square miles (15.8 km^{2})
- Discharge
  - location: Richardson Creek
  - average: 7.45 cu ft/s (0.211 m^{3}/s) at mouth with Richardson Creek

Basin features
- Progression: generally north
- River system: Pee Dee River
- Tributaries
  - left: unnamed tributaries
  - right: unnamed tributaries
- Bridges: Plyler Mill Road, Richardson Road, Austin Road, Buford Shortcut Road

Adams Branch is a 4.64 mi (7.47 km) tributary of Richardson Creek in south-central North Carolina that rises in Union County near Alton, North Carolina and then flows generally north through Union County to Richardson Creek.

== Maps ==
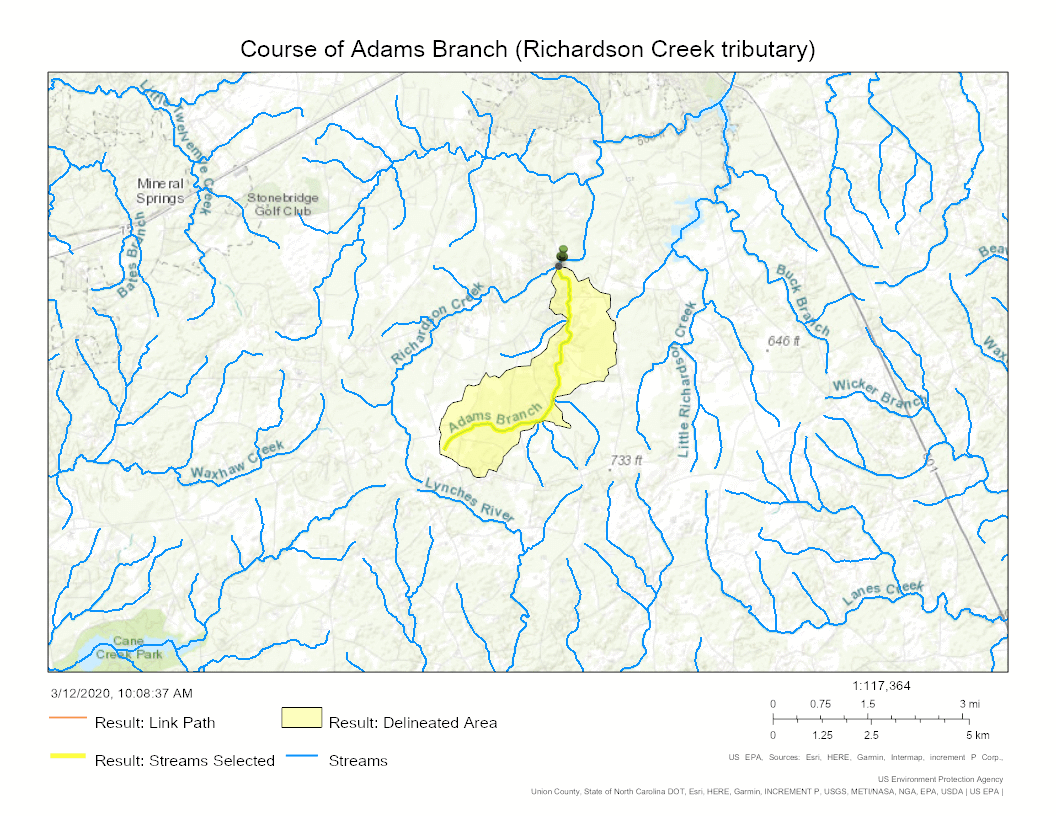
Course of Adams Branch (Richardson Creek tributary)

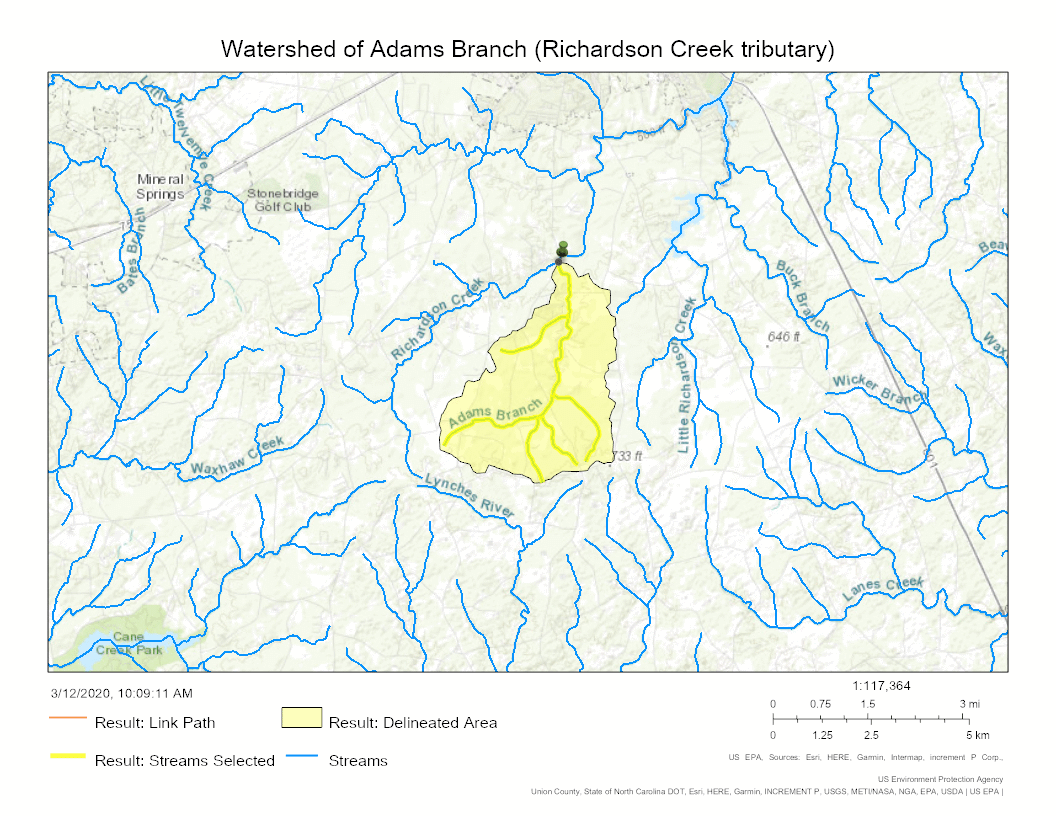
Watershed of Adams Branch (Richardson Creek tributary)

== See also ==
- List of North Carolina rivers
