= Browns Creek (Cape Fear River tributary) =

Stream in North Carolina, USA

Browns Creek Tributary to Cape Fear River
- Location of Browns Creek mouth Browns Creek (Cape Fear River tributary) (the United States)

Location
- Country: United States
- State: North Carolina
- County: Bladen
- City: Elizabethtown

Physical characteristics
- Source: Sheriff White Bay, a Carolina Bay
  - location: about 1 mile southeast of Dublin, North Carolina
  - coordinates: 34°38′03″N 078°41′07″W
  - elevation: 125 ft (38 m)
- Mouth: Cape Fear River
  - location: about 1.5 miles east of Elizabethtown, North Carolina
  - coordinates: 34°37′33″N 078°33′36″W
  - elevation: 23 ft (7.0 m)
- Length: 18.79 mi (30.24 km)
- Basin size: 18.79 square miles (48.7 km^{2})
- Discharge
  - location: Cape Fear River
  - average: 21.00 cu ft/s (0.595 m^{3}/s) at mouth with Cape Fear River

Basin features
- Progression: Cape Fear River → Atlantic Ocean
- River system: Cape Fear River
- Tributaries
  - left: unnamed tributaries
  - right: unnamed tributaries
- Waterbodies: Cross Pond
- Bridges: Hugs Hog Farm Road, Browns Creek Church Road, Westwood Drive, unnamed road, Peanut Plant Road, NC 87, Martin Luther King Drive, US 701-NC 242, Mercer Mill Road, NC 87

Browns Creek is a 27.78 mi (44.71 km) long 2nd order tributary to the Cape Fear River in Bladen County, North Carolina.

== Course ==
Browns Creek rises in Sheriff White Pond, a Carolina Bay, about 1 mile southeast of Dublin, North Carolina. Browns Creek then flows southeast and east through the south side of Elizabethtown to join the Cape Fear River about 1.5 miles east of Elizabethtown, North Carolina.

== Watershed ==
Browns Creek drains 18.79 square miles (48.7 km^{2}) of area, receives about 49.2 in/year of precipitation, has a wetness index of 561.30 and is about 21% forested.

== See also ==
- List of rivers of North Carolina
