= McMullen Creek =

Stream and associated greenway in Charlotte, North Carolina

Coordinates: 35.0664°N 80.8693°W

McMullen Creek is a stream located in the southern part of Charlotte, North Carolina, within Mecklenburg County. It is a major tributary in the county's network of waterways and is known locally for the extensive greenway trail that runs along its banks.

== Course and Watershed ==
McMullen Creek is situated entirely within the urbanized limits of Charlotte and Mecklenburg County. The stream is part of the larger Catawba River Basin, which is the ultimate destination for the water flow.

The McMullen Creek watershed is characterized as highly urbanized, with residential land use making up over 80% of the drainage area. The stream is monitored by the United States Geological Survey (USGS), which maintains stream gauges to track water levels and flow. At the gauge near Sharon View Road, the drainage area is documented as approximately 6.95 square miles. Certain sections of the stream are prone to flooding, which is monitored by the National Weather Service (NWS) via gauges such as the one located near Lincrest Place.

== Greenway ==
The creek is most widely known for the McMullen Creek Greenway, a segment of the larger Mecklenburg County Greenway System. The McMullen Creek Greenway is connected to the Lower McAlpine Creek Greenway and the Four Mile Creek Greenway, forming a continuous multi-use pathway network. This interconnected route is approximately 5.8 miles (9.3 km) long. The greenway features varied surfaces, including pavement, crushed gravel, and elevated wooden boardwalks that traverse swampy sections of the floodplain. The path runs through a protected riparian area consisting of woodland, floodplain, and wetland habitats. The greenway corridor is an important ecological site, hosting the first documented great blue heron rookery in Mecklenburg County. The area also provides shelter for various other bird species, including the migratory American redstart and scarlet tanager.

== See also ==
- Catawba River
- Little Sugar Creek Greenway
