= North Landing River =

River in Virginia and North Carolina, United States of America

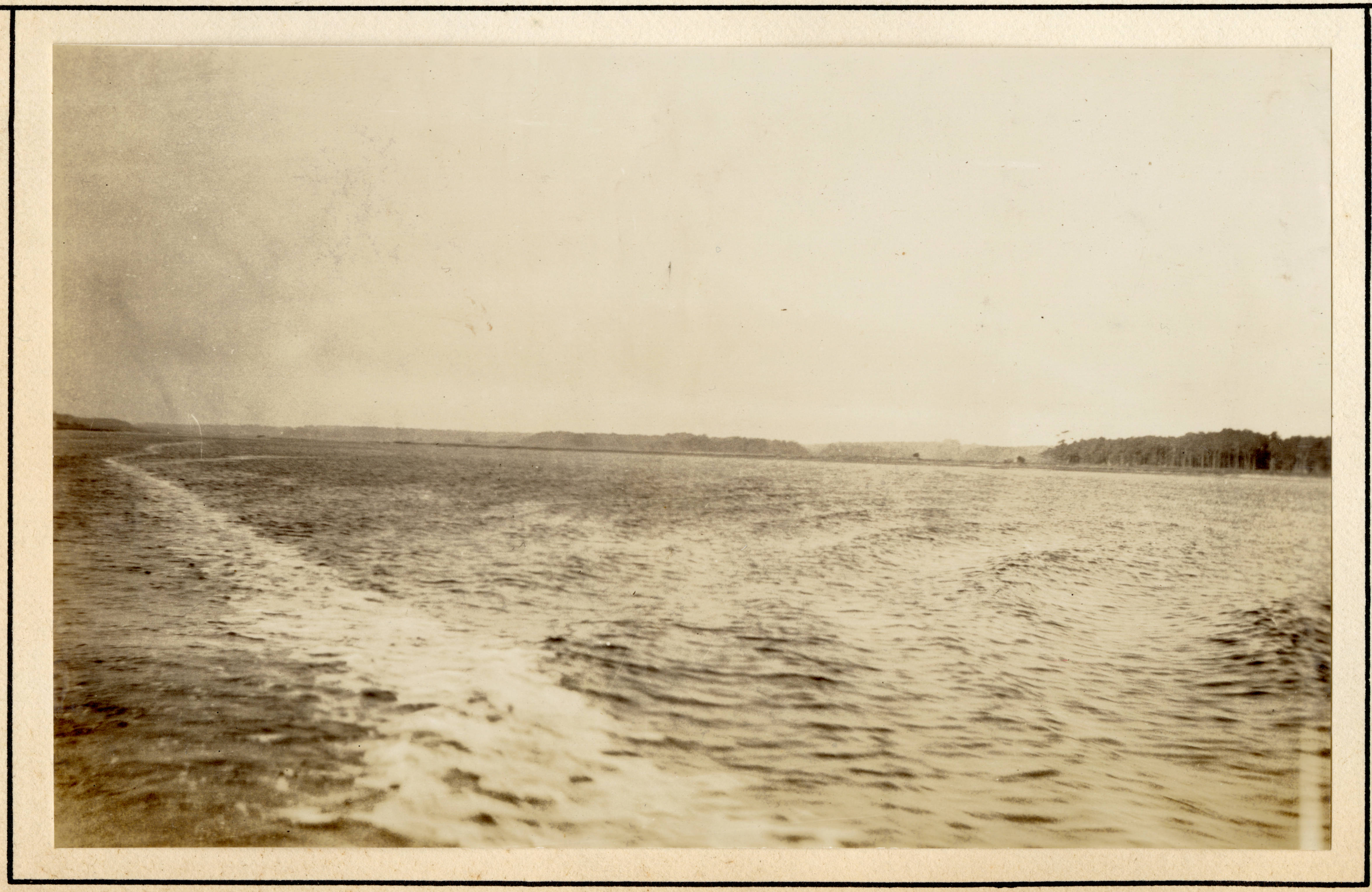
- 1930 photo of the river

- Location of mouth

Location
- Country: United States
- State: Virginia, North Carolina

Physical characteristics
- Source
  - location: Virginia
  - coordinates: 36°49′03″N 76°08′58″W
- Mouth
  - location: North Carolina
  - coordinates: 36°35′43″N 76°03′35″W

The North Landing River is a river in the U.S. states of Virginia and North Carolina.

== See also ==
- List of rivers of North Carolina
- List of rivers of Virginia
