= Adams Branch (South Grand River tributary) =

Stream in Missouri, U.S.

Adams Branch Tributary to South Grand River
- Location of Adams Branch mouth

Location
- Country: United States
- State: Missouri
- County: Cass

Physical characteristics
- Source: Wolf Creek divide
  - location: about 3 miles northeast of Freeman, Missouri
  - coordinates: 38°40′08″N 94°27′47″W
  - elevation: 960 ft (290 m)
- Mouth: South Grand River
  - location: about 2 miles southeast of Freeman, Missouri
  - coordinates: 38°36′30″N 94°27′47″W
  - elevation: 807 ft (246 m)
- Length: 5.21 mi (8.38 km)
- Basin size: 7.07 square miles (18.3 km^{2})
- Discharge
  - location: South Grand River
  - average: 8.43 cu ft/s (0.239 m^{3}/s) at mouth with South Grand River

Basin features
- Progression: South Grand River → Osage River → Missouri River → Mississippi River → Gulf of Mexico
- River system: Osage River
- Tributaries
  - left: unnamed tributaries
  - right: unnamed tributaries
- Bridges: E 251st Street, S Baiers Den Road, E 255th Street, E 261st Street, E 264th Street, MO 2

Adams Branch is a stream in Cass County, Missouri. It is a tributary of the South Grand River.

Adams Branch was named after William Adams, a pioneer citizen.

== Course ==
Adams Branch rises about 3 miles northeast of Freeman, Missouri, in Cass County and then flows south to join the South Grand River about 2 miles southeast of Freeman.

== Watershed ==
Adams Branch drains 7.07 square miles (18.3 km^{2}) of area, receives about 40.2 in/year of precipitation, has a wetness index of 447.51, and is about 15% forested.

== See also ==
- List of rivers of Missouri
