= Sargents Creek (Hyco River tributary) =

Stream in North Carolina, USA

Sargents Creek Tributary to Hyco River
- Location of Sargents Creek mouth Sargents Creek (Hyco River tributary) (the United States)

Location
- Country: United States
- State: North Carolina
- County: Person

Physical characteristics
- Source: Little Duck Creek divide
  - location: about 0.25 miles north of Olive Hill, North Carolina
  - coordinates: 36°25′46″N 079°02′40″W
  - elevation: 598 ft (182 m)
- Mouth: Hyco River
  - location: about 4 miles east-southeast of Semora, North Carolina
  - coordinates: 36°29′42″N 079°04′50″W
  - elevation: 410 ft (120 m)
- Length: 5.08 mi (8.18 km)
- Basin size: 6.09 square miles (15.8 km^{2})
- Discharge
  - location: Hyco River
  - average: 7.59 cu ft/s (0.215 m^{3}/s) at mouth with Hyco River

Basin features
- Progression: Hyco River → Dan River → Roanoke River → Albemarle Sound
- River system: Roanoke River
- Tributaries
  - left: unnamed tributaties
  - right: unnamed tributaries
- Bridges: Concord Sefco Road, Concord Ceffo Road, Roxboro Plant Road

Sargents Creek is a 5.08 mi (8.18 km) long 1st order tributary to the Hyco River in Person County, North Carolina. Sargents Creek joins the Hyco River within Hyco Lake.

== Course ==
Sargents Creek rises in a pond about 0.25 miles north of Olive Hill, North Carolina and then flows north-northwest to join the Hyco River about 4 miles east-southeast of Semora.

== Watershed ==
Sargents Creek drains 6.09 square miles (15.8 km^{2}) of area, receives about 46.3 in/year of precipitation, has a wetness index of 438.41, and is about 46% forested.
