= Duncan, North Carolina =

Unincorporated community in North Carolina, US

Coordinates: 35°33′46″N 78°52′19″W

Duncan is an unincorporated community located in the Buckhorn Township of Harnett County, North Carolina (Powell 1968, p. 151), United States. It is a part of the Dunn Micropolitan Area, which is also a part of the greater Raleigh–Durham–Cary Combined Statistical Area (CSA) as defined by the United States Census Bureau.

Duncan was formerly known as Casma at least into the 1930s. As the rail road activity expanded along the Duncan Depot Station, the community became known as Duncan.

Avents Creek and Parkers Creek, both tributaries to the Cape Fear River, rise in ponds near Duncan.
