= Chalybeate Springs, North Carolina =

Unincorporated community in North Carolina, US

Coordinates: 35°30′31″N 78°48′50″W

Chalybeate Springs (/kəˈlɪbi.ət sprɪŋz/ kə-LIB-ee-ət SPRINGZ) (sometimes simply Chalybeate) is an unincorporated community located in the Hector's Creek Township of Harnett County, North Carolina, United States. It is a part of the Dunn Micropolitan Area, which is also a part of the greater Raleigh–Durham–Cary Combined Statistical Area (CSA) as defined by the United States Census Bureau.

The community was first settled in 1760 and was named for the nearby springs containing iron salts, around which developed an early health resort (Powell 1968, p. 98). The community was formally laid out as a 100-acre (0.40 km^{2}) town in 1902 along the Raleigh and Cape Fear Railway (Hairr 2002, p. 104), which is now part of the Norfolk Southern Railway.
