= Meherrin River =

River in Virginia and North Carolina in the United States

Meherrin River Tributary to the Chowan River
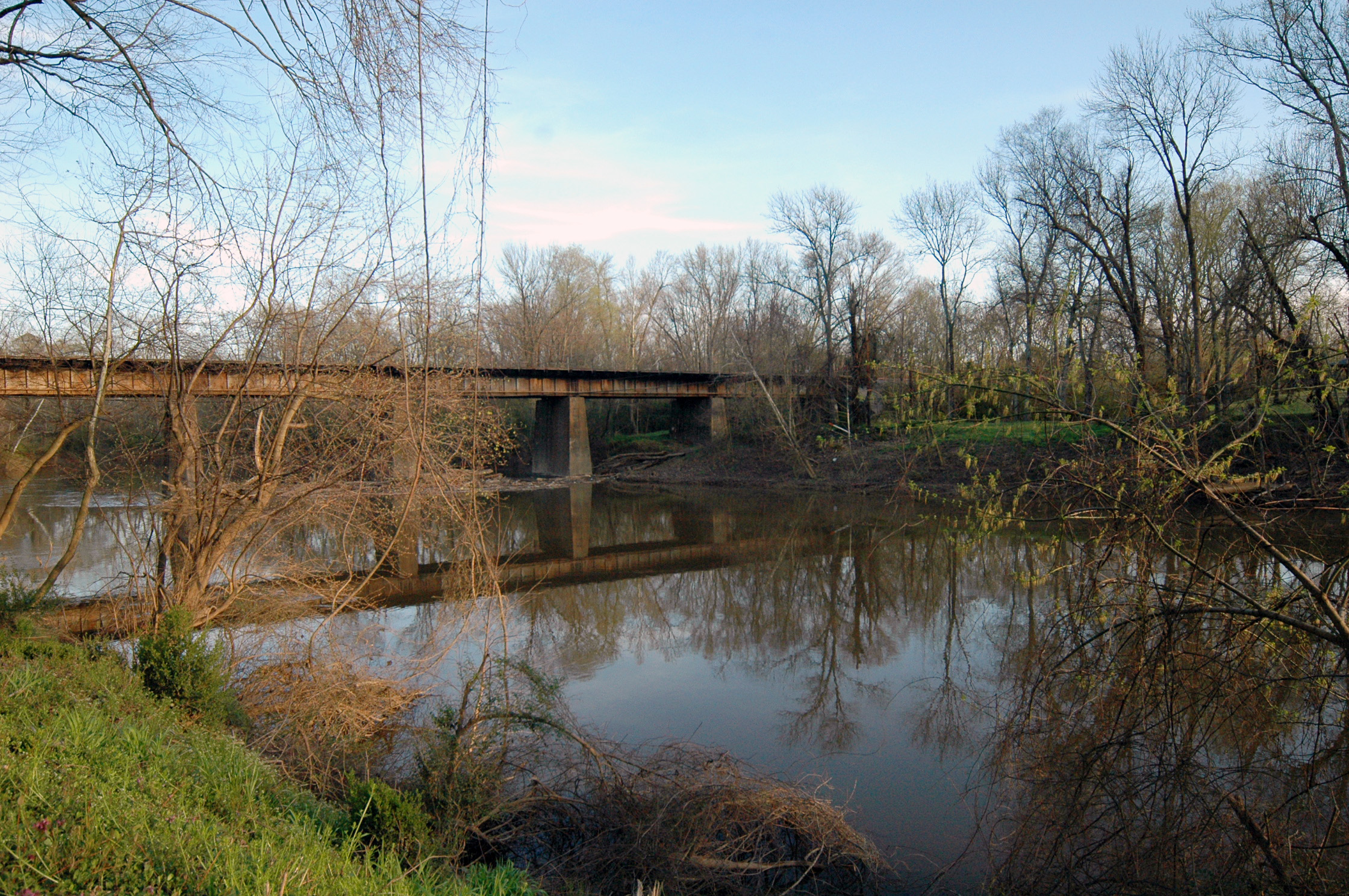
- The Meherrin River at Emporia, Virginia.

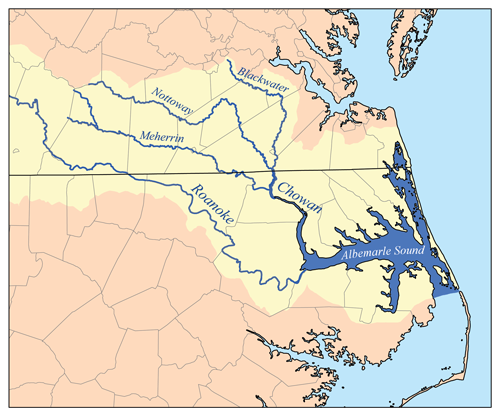
- Chowan River watershed

- Location of the Meherrin River's mouth Meherrin River (the United States)

Location
- Country: United States
- State: Virginia; North Carolina
- County: Hertford (NC); Northampton (NC); Southampton (VA); Greensville (VA); Brunswick (VA); Mecklenburg (VA); Lunenburg (VA)
- City: Emporia, Virginia; Murfreesboro, North Carolina

Physical characteristics
- Source: confluence of South Meherrin River and North Meherrin River
  - location: Reekes Mill, Virginia
  - coordinates: 36°49′11″N 078°16′32″W
  - elevation: 258 ft (79 m)
- Mouth: Chowan River
  - location: about 0.5 miles north of Chowan Beach, North Carolina
  - coordinates: 36°25′54″N 076°56′53″W
  - elevation: 0 ft (0 m)
- Length: 143.37 mi (230.73 km)
- Basin size: 1,601.05 square miles (4,146.7 km^{2})
- Discharge
  - location: Chowan River
  - average: 1,565.82 cu ft/s (44.339 m^{3}/s) at mouth with Chowan River

Basin features
- Progression: Chowan River → Albemarle Sound
- River system: Chowan River
- Tributaries
  - left: North Meherrin River, Mason Creek, Crooked Creek, Flat Rock Creek, Stony Creek, Aaron Creek, Shining Creek, Briery Branch, Flat Branch, Saddletree Creek, Totaro Creek, Great Creek, Robinson Creek, Reedy Creek, Greensville Creek, Metcalf Branch, Caney Branch, Big Branch, Buckhorn Swamp, Burnt Reeds Swamp
  - right: South Meherrin River, Buckhorn Creek, Piney Creek, Mountain Creek, Smith Creek, Taylors Creek, Evans Creek, Genito Creek, Hays Creek, Allen Creek, Coldwater Creek, Big Branch, Brandy Creek, Lightfoot Creek, Millpond Creek, Douglas Run, Falling Run, Fountains Creek, Cypress Creek, Kirbys Creek, Worrell Mill Swamp, Potecasi Creek
- Bridges: Oral Oaks Road, North Whittles Mill Road, Craig Mill Road, VA 138, Dixie Bridge Road, I-85, US 1, US 58, Robinson Ferry Road, Meherrin Beach Road, VA 46, Iron Bridge Road, Western Mill Road, I-95, Main Street, Hicksford Avenue, Little Texas Road, NC 186, Branches Bridge Road, NC 35, Boones Bridge Road, US 258,

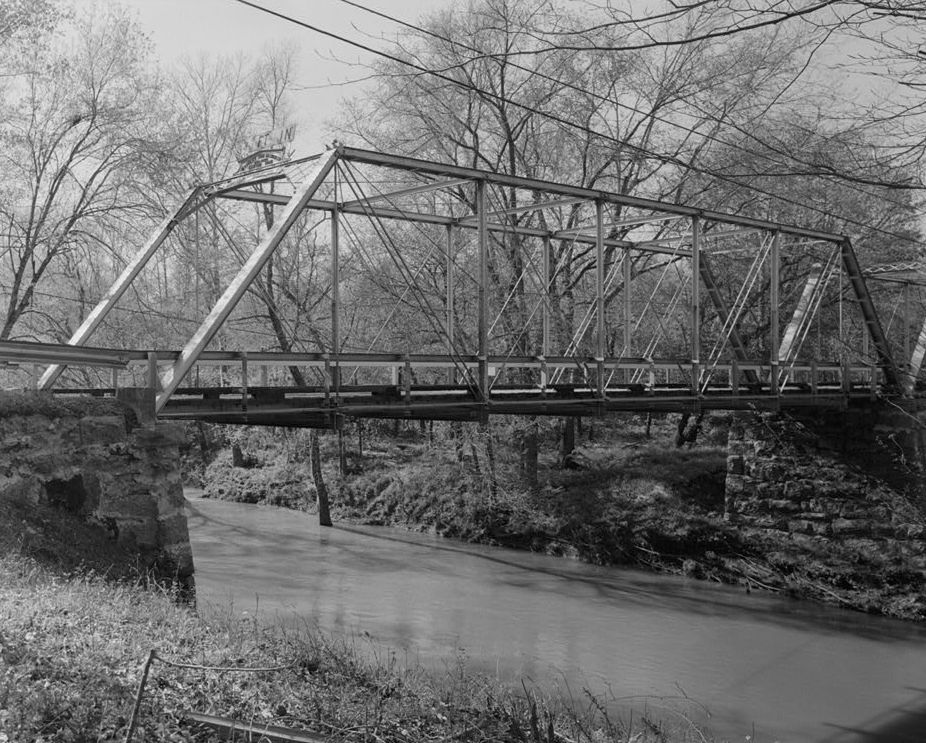
Gholson Bridge, spanning the Meherrin River at Virginia State Route 715 in Brunswick County, Virginia.

The Meherrin River is a 143.37 mi (230.73 km) long river in Virginia and North Carolina in the United States. It is a sixth-order tributary of the Chowan River, which it joins in Hertford County, North Carolina.

== Etymology ==
The river was named after the Meherrin Indians, whose territory was along it. According to the Geographic Names Information System, it has also been known historically as the:

- Maherine River
- Maherrin River
- Mehearin River
- Meherin River
- Pochike River
- Wayanock
- Woodford River

== Course ==
The Meherrin River forms at the confluence of the North Meherrin River and South Meherrin River at Reekes Mill, Virginia, then flows southeastward into North Carolina to join the Chowan River about 0.5 miles (0.8 km) north of Chowan Beach in Hertford County, North Carolina. A 20-foot (6.1 m) high dam on the river creates a reservoir in Emporia, Virginia. For most of its length, the Meherrin is not large enough for commercial traffic, but it widens somewhat between Murfreesboro, North Carolina, and the Chowan. Prior to the American Civil War (1861–1865), this wider section of the river was a significant trading route for Northeastern North Carolina.

== Watershed ==
The Meherrin River drainage basin includes an area of 1,601.05 square miles (4,146.7 km^{2}), receives an average of about 46.3 inches (1,176 mm) of precipitation per year, has a wetness index of 495.22, and is about 46% forested.

== See also ==
- List of rivers of Virginia
