= Mamers, North Carolina =

- Census-designated place
- Location within North Carolina Location within the United States
- Coordinates: 35°24′58″N 78°56′21″W
- Country: United States
- State: North Carolina
- County: Harnett

Area
  - Total: 6.05 sq mi (15.67 km^{2})
  - Land: 6.04 sq mi (15.65 km^{2})
  - Water: 0.0077 sq mi (0.02 km^{2})
- Elevation: 338 ft (103 m)

Population (2020)
  - Total: 814
  - Density: 134.7/sq mi (52.02/km^{2})
- Time zone: UTC-5 (Eastern (EST))
  - Summer (DST): UTC-4 (EDT)
- ZIP code: 27552
- Area codes: 910, 472
- FIPS code: 37-40860
- GNIS feature ID: 2584325

Mamers (/ˈmeɪmɜːrs/ MAY-murs is an unincorporated community and census-designated place (CDP) in Harnett County, North Carolina, United States. As of the 2020 census, Mamers had a population of 814. It is a part of the Dunn Micropolitan Area, which is also a part of the greater Raleigh–Durham–Cary Combined Statistical Area (CSA) as defined by the United States Census Bureau.

== Geography ==
The community is in west-central Harnett County in Upper Little River Township. U.S. Route 421 is the main road through the northern side of the community, and Old US Highway 421 runs through the center. Lillington, the county seat, is 7 miles (11 km) to the east, and Sanford is 15 miles (24 km) to the west. Immediate neighbors of Mamers are Luart to the east and Ryes to the west. According to the United States Census Bureau, the Mamers CDP has a total area of 6.1 square miles (15.7 km^{2}), of which 0.01 square miles (0.02 km^{2}), or 0.15%, are water.

Prominent nearby landmarks include the community United States Post Office (ZIP Code 27552). Mamers is in the Boone Trail Elementary School district as well as in the Western Harnett middle and high school districts.

== Demographics ==
Historical population
| Census | Pop. | Note | %± |
|---|---|---|---|
| 2020 | 814 | | — |
U.S. Decennial Census
