= North River (North Carolina) =

River in North Carolina, United States

Coordinates: 36°15′45″N 75°57′45″W

The North River is a tidal river, approximately 18 miles (29 km) long, in eastern North Carolina, the United States. It forms the boundary between Currituck and Camden counties.

The river rises in the Great Swamp, 10 miles east of Elizabeth City, North Carolina at the juncture of Indiantown Creek. The river's mouth, where it is approximately four miles wide, is in Albemarle Sound, midway between the mouth of the Pasquotank River to the west and the south end of Currituck Sound to the east. The lower two-thirds of the river is part of the Intracoastal Waterway.

A reservation was established for the Weapemeoc (Yeopim) tribe in 1704 along the North River. A total of 10, 240 acres were set aside for this tribe. However, due to rampant colonialism, this reservation was disestablished and subsequently sold to settlers in 1739.
