= Broadway, North Carolina =

- Town
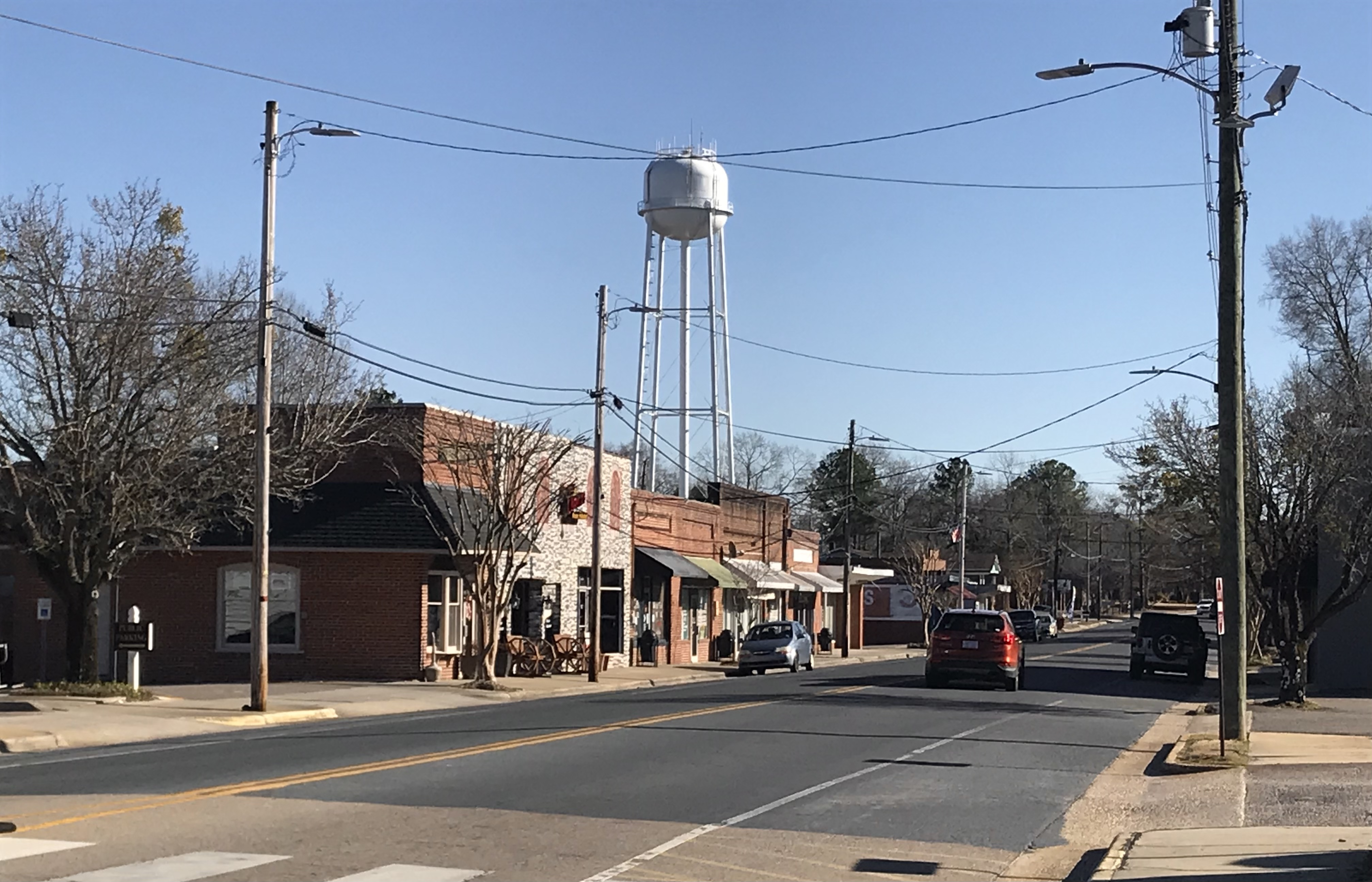
- South Main Street

- Location within North Carolina Location within the United States
- Coordinates: 35°27′28″N 79°03′17″W
- Country: United States
- State: North Carolina
- Counties: Lee, Harnett

Government
  - Mayor: Donald F. Andrews

Area
  - Total: 1.33 sq mi (3.44 km^{2})
  - Land: 1.29 sq mi (3.35 km^{2})
  - Water: 0.035 sq mi (0.09 km^{2})
- Elevation: 472 ft (144 m)

Population (2020)
  - Total: 1,267
  - Density: 979.0/sq mi (377.99/km^{2})
- Time zone: UTC-5 (Eastern (EST))
  - Summer (DST): UTC-4 (EDT)
- ZIP Code: 27505
- Area code: 919
- FIPS code: 37-08080
- GNIS feature ID: 2405324
- Website: broadwaync.com

Broadway is a town in Lee County, North Carolina, United States. As of the 2020 census, Broadway had a population of 1,267.

== History ==
According to the book, Broadway North Carolina: 1870-1970, Broadway was settled in 1870 and incorporated as a town in 1907. The name "Broadway" comes from a broad level opening in the region's vast pine forest where the town was established. Among the early settlers of the area which is now Broadway were Hugh Matthews, Grisham Thomas, Tilmon Thomas, M.M. Watson, and Captain J.O.A. Kelly. African American families that settled in the area included the Buchanans, Camerons, McLeans, Minters, and Womacks.

Broadway celebrated the centennial of its settlement in October 1970. During this event men and women had a street dance and dressed as they did in the 1870s. Broadway celebrated the centennial of its incorporation as well as the centennial of Lee County in 2007. Broadway recently celebrated "Broadway Our Way" in April 2009. A few years into the 21st century, many citizens of Broadway town proper paid a visit to New York to see a Broadway show, and in return Broadway, New York, came to Broadway, North Carolina. A show was put on at Broadway Elementary School with Sandy Duncan, actress of television and stage leading the way.

== Government ==
The town of Broadway has a mayor and council form of government. Past mayors of the town include M.A. McLeod, A.P. Thomas, Vernon Stevens, Sion Hubert Rosser, Leonard Rosser, H.A. Thomas, Thelma Sloan, Ralph Hunter, Henry Green, Harold Harrington. The current mayor is Donald Andrews.

== Emergency Services ==
The town of Broadway is covered by the Broadway Police Department & the Lee County Sheriff's Office for law enforcement matters. The Cape Fear Rural Fire Department provides fire protection to the town. The fire department was established in 1953 and has been providing services since. First Health of the Carolinas EMS provides emergency medical services and received the county contract in 2023.

== Finance ==
The Bank of Broadway was started by D.E. Shaw in 1909. During the Great Depression the Bank of Broadway kept operations running, and it was noted in the Sanford Herald on January 23, 1930: "Bank of Broadway is an unusual institution. In the midst of financial depression, it is in a flourishing condition." It is widely believed and recorded somewhere in the annals of the SEC and FDIC history that on the March 6, 1933, Bank Holiday, the Bank of Broadway did not close its doors, the examiners stated that the books were in proper order and the accounts were solvent, keep operating. The Bank of Broadway has changed hands over the years, becoming first the Central Bank and Trust Company, then the Carolina Bank, the branch was closed in 2018.

== Geography ==
Broadway is located in eastern Lee County. It is 8 miles (13 km) east of Sanford, the county seat. U.S. Route 421 passes south of the town limits, leading west to Sanford and east 14 miles (23 km) to Lillington.

According to the United States Census Bureau, the town of Broadway has a total area of 1.3 square miles (3.4 km^{2}), of which 1.3 square miles (3.3 km^{2}) are land and 0.04 square miles (0.1 km^{2}), or 2.55%, are water.

== Demographics ==
Historical population
Census	Pop.	Note	%±
1910	149		—
1920	250		67.8%
1930	347		38.8%
1940	338		−2.6%
1950	469		38.8%
1960	466		−0.6%
1970	694		48.9%
1980	908		30.8%
1990	973		7.2%
2000	1,015		4.3%
2010	1,229		21.1%
2020	1,267		3.1%
U.S. Decennial Census

=== 2020 census ===
Broadway racial composition
Race	Number	Percentage
White (non-Hispanic)	927	73.16%
Black or African American (non-Hispanic)	83	6.55%
Native American	15	1.18%
Asian	8	0.63%
Other/Mixed	65	5.13%
Hispanic or Latino	169	13.34%

As of the 2020 United States census, there were 1,267 people, 544 households, and 384 families residing in the town.

=== 2000 census ===
As of the census of 2000, there were 1,015 people, 400 households, and 318 families residing in the town. The population density was 812.2 inhabitants per square mile (313.6/km^{2}). There were 419 housing units at an average density of 335.3 units per square mile (129.5 units/km^{2}). The racial makeup of the town was 90.54% White, 8.47% African American, 0.49% Native American, and 0.49% from two or more races. Hispanic or Latino of any race were 1.48% of the population.

There were 400 households, out of which 31.5% had children under the age of 18 living with them, 65.5% were married couples living together, 8.0% had a female householder with no husband present, and 20.5% were non-families. 17.0% of all households were made up of individuals, and 8.8% had someone living alone who was 65 years of age or older. The average household size was 2.54 and the average family size was 2.83.

In the town, the population was spread out, with 23.0% under the age of 18, 5.9% from 18 to 24, 28.7% from 25 to 44, 29.1% from 45 to 64, and 13.4% who were 65 years of age or older. The median age was 40 years. For every 100 females, there were 97.5 males. For every 100 females age 18 and over, there were 89.3 males.

The median income for a household in the town was $52,917, and the median income for a family was $57,500. Males had a median income of $36,357 versus $24,667 for females. The per capita income for the town was $24,397. About 4.1% of families and 6.4% of the population were below the poverty line, including 11.0% of those under age 18 and 12.9% of those age 65 or over.
