= Kipling, North Carolina =

Unincorporated community in North Carolina, US

Coordinates: 35°28′48″N 78°49′16″W

Kipling is an unincorporated community located along U.S. Route 401 in the Hectors Creek Township of Harnett County, North Carolina, United States, situated between the communities of Cape Fear and Chalybeate Springs north of Lillington. It is a part of the Dunn Micropolitan Area, which is also a part of the greater Raleigh–Durham–Cary Combined Statistical Area (CSA) as defined by the United States Census Bureau.

Kipling was formerly known as Bradley's Store during the late 19th century (Powell 1968, p. 265). An incorporation effort for the community failed in 2001. Notable landmarks here include the community post office (ZIP code 27543).
