= Crabtree Creek (Neuse River tributary) =

Stream in North Carolina, US

Crabtree Creek Tributary to Neuse River
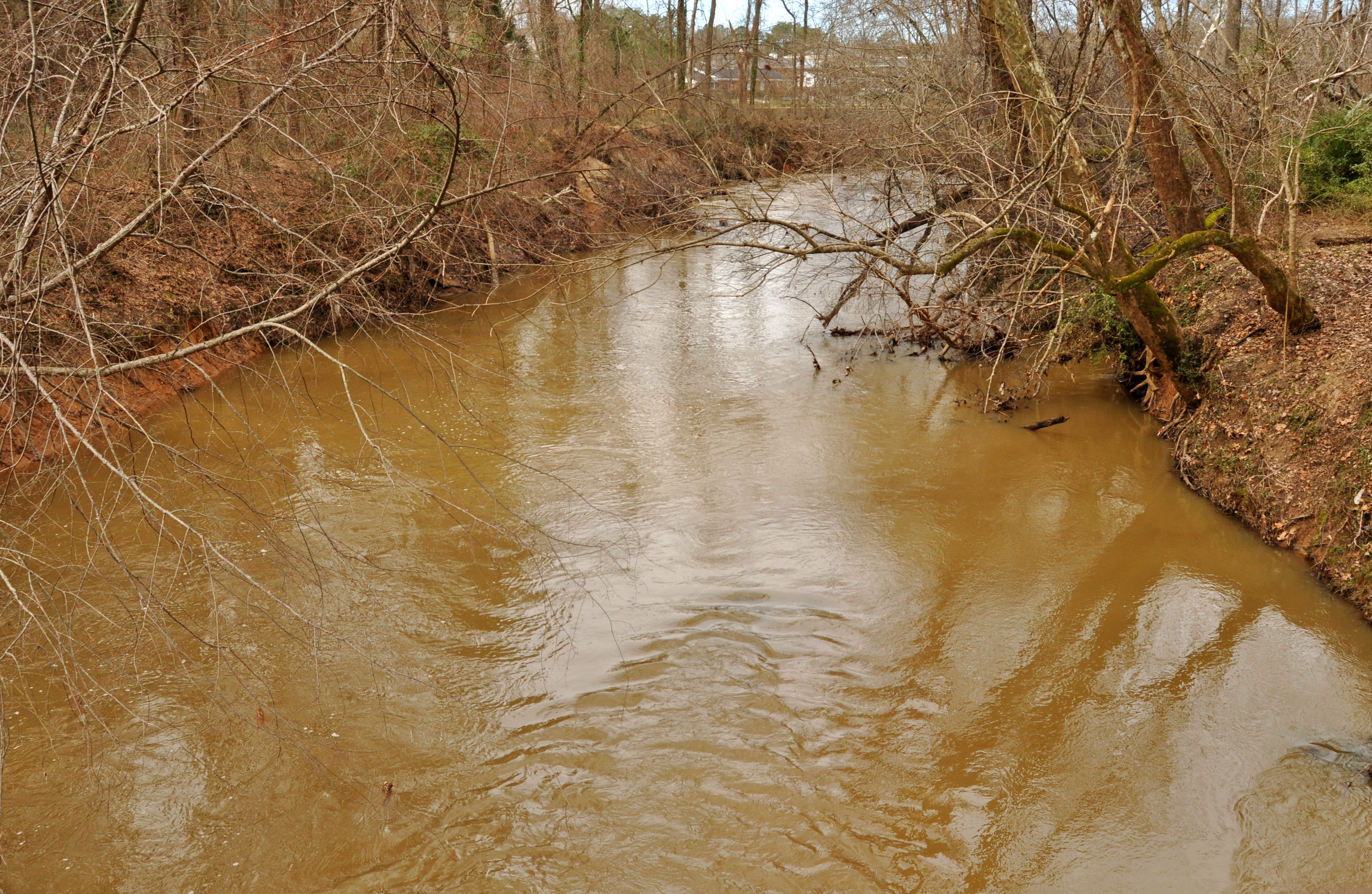
- Crabtree Creek east of Lassiter Mill Road

- Location of Crabtree Creek mouth Crabtree Creek (Neuse River tributary) (the United States)

Location
- Country: United States
- State: North Carolina
- County: Wake
- City: Raleigh; Cary

Physical characteristics
- Source: between Cary and Apex, North Carolina, southwest of Bond Park
  - location: Cary, North Carolina
  - coordinates: 35°45′30″N 078°50′41″W
  - elevation: 450 ft (140 m)
- Mouth: Neuse River
  - location: about 2 mi (3.2 km) southeast of Wilders Grove, North Carolina
  - coordinates: 35°45′59″N 078°32′22″W
  - elevation: 157 ft (48 m)
- Length: 28.73 mi (46.24 km)
- Basin size: 145.27 square miles (376.2 km^{2})
- Discharge
  - location: Neuse River
  - average: 174.58 cu ft/s (4.944 m^{3}/s) at mouth with Neuse River

Basin features
- Progression: Neuse River → Pamlico Sound → Atlantic Ocean
- River system: Neuse River
- Tributaries
  - left: Turkey Creek; Stirrup Iron Creek Haleys Branch; Sycamore Creek; Hare Snipe Creek; Mine Creek; Big Branch; Marsh Creek
  - right: Coles Branch; Reedy Creek; Richland Creek; House Creek; Beaverdam Creek; Pigeon House Branch; Bridges Branch
- Waterbodies: Lake Crabtree; Bond Lake

Crabtree Creek is a tributary of the Neuse River in central Wake County, North Carolina, United States. The creek begins in the town of Cary and flows through Morrisville, William B. Umstead State Park, and the northern sections of Raleigh (roughly along I-440) before emptying into the Neuse at Anderson Point Park, a large city park located in East Raleigh.

== History ==
=== Mills ===
According to the City of Raleigh plaque at the site, one of Wake County's first mills was located on Crabtree Creek at a site known as "the Great Falls of Crabtree." The first mill was constructed before 1764, and the current foundations are remnants of a grist mill constructed by Cornelius Jesse Lassiter in 1908. The mill was destroyed by fire in 1958. Today, the Lassiter Mill site is a Raleigh city park, part of the greenway system, and is open to the public.

Anderson Page established Company Mill, a grist mill, on the Creek in the late 1800s. Ruins of the mill, including the stone wall of the mill dam, can be seen just off Company Mill Trail in Umstead Park. The site of the millpond is now known as Adams Crossroads. His grandson, journalist Walter Hines Page, wrote The Southerner, a novel partially set at Company Mill.

=== Flooding ===
The creek lies within a flood plain that is historically prone to frequent flooding throughout its length, even after moderate rainfall. Construction of lakes on the creek and its tributaries to control floods have only partially alleviated this problem because rapid development of Wake County has greatly increased storm runoff. Crabtree Mall derives its name from the creek; when the mall was constructed, the creek was redirected into an artificial channel behind the mall. At the time of construction there were predictions that the mall would flood. In fact, the new channel of the creek at the mall has proved to be inadequate for peak flows.

The highest recorded level of Crabtree Creek, measured at Glenwood Avenue near the mall, was 27.69 feet (8.44 m) in June 1973 shortly after the mall's completion. Tropical Storm Alberto in June 2006 caused the second-highest water level on record, 23.77 feet (7.25 m); and Hurricane Fran in September 1996 caused the third-highest water level, 23.00 feet (7.01 m). All three events flooded the lower level of the mall, inundated the mall's parking lots, and obstructed traffic in the vicinity. Even moderate storms wreak minor havoc around the mall; for instance, a storm in August 2006 caused an evacuation of the mall and significant property damage.

The United States Geological Survey has a monitoring station on Crabtree Creek at Highway 70 in Raleigh. The station's data provides for better modeling and flood forecasting. There is an educational installation on Crabtree Creek Trail between Crabtree Valley Mall and Glenwood Avenue with a visualization of the creek's flooding over the past 50 years.

=== Dams ===
Numerous flood control dams have been built on Crabtree Creek.

In 1970, an earth dam was built in the Cary/Morrisville area. The U.S. Department of Agriculture Natural Resources Conservation Services (USDA NRCS) designed dam is 1,320 feet long and 45 feet tall. Originally called Crabtree Creek W/S Structure #3, the dam is now called the Fred G. Bond Dam because of its association with Bond Lake and the Fred G. Bond Metro Park in Cary. The dam was repaired during the winter between January 2016 and January 2020.

In the Cary/Morrisville area, the creek was dammed in 1988 to create Lake Crabtree, a 520-acre (2.1 km^{2}) flood control lake. Lake Crabtree Dam or Crabtree W/S Structure #23 is an earth structure 1,200 feet long and 45 feet tall, designed by USDA NRCS. Lake Crabtree County Park, Raleigh's Crabtree Boulevard and Raleigh's Crabtree Park are all either named after the creek or the adjoining lake. The Crabtree Creek Trail, a branch of the Capital Area Greenway, follows the course of the creek from a location just west of Crabtree Mall to the confluence with the Neuse River at Anderson Point Park.

== Crabtree Creek Greenway ==
The Crabtree Creek greenway is a 14.6-mile (23.5 km) paved trail that follows Crabtree Creek northwest from the Neuse River Trail beginning at Anderson Point Park to Lindsay Dr. The final 4.1-mile (6.6 km) "east extension" section was completed in 2015 connecting the existing trail at Milburnie Road to the Neuse River Trail at Anderson Point Park. The city is planning a "west extension" (which will extend the 14.6 miles) to Umstead State Park. That project's planning will take approximately 12 months to complete with construction beginning on 2021-10. The completed Crabtree Creek Trail will extend across the city, connecting numerous important areas and facilities: Umstead State Park, Crabtree Mall, North Raleigh, Shelley Lake, Sertoma Park, Lassiter Mill, Kiwanis Park, and Anderson Point Park. As of 2023 the section between Duraleigh Road and Umstead State Park is open.

== Research ==
In 2025, researchers from North Carolina State University released plastic bottles with GPS monitors and QR codes into the creek to study how litter from Raleigh travels to the Atlantic Ocean.

== Watershed ==
=== Tributaries ===
Tributaries of Crabtree Creek (Neuse River tributary)

Name, Bank	Watershed Area in Square Miles (km^{2})	Average Discharge	Mouth Coordinates	Mouth Elevation	Source Coordinates	Source Elevation	Remarks
Mouth	145.27 square miles (376.2 km^{2})	174.58 cu ft/s (4.944 m^{3}/s)	35°45′59″N 078°32′22″W	157 ft (48 m)	35°45′30″N 078°50′41″W	450 ft (140 m)	Crabtree Creek begins between Cary and Apex, North Carolina southwest of Bond Park. The creek drains a large part of Raleigh, North Carolina.
Marsh Creek, left bank	9.58 square miles (24.8 km^{2})	13.24 cu ft/s (0.375 m^{3}/s)	35°47′43″N 078°35′43″W	174 ft (53 m)	35°52′19″N 078°37′03″W	408 ft (124 m)	Marsh Creek rises near Northridge Country Club in Raleigh, North Carolina, on the divide of it and Perry Creek. The creek then flows southeast to Crabtree Creek.
Bridges Branch, right bank	0.46 square miles (1.2 km^{2})	0.59 cu ft/s (0.017 m^{3}/s)	35°48′13″N 078°36′30″W	197 ft (60 m)	35°47′15″N 078°47′15″W	300 ft (91 m)	Bridges Branch is the smallest named tributary to Crabtree Creek and drains Lions Park. It rises near St. Augustine's University and flows north to Crabtree Creek.
Pigeon House Branch, right bank	4.69 square miles (12.1 km^{2})	5.29 cu ft/s (0.150 m^{3}/s)	35°48′16″N 078°36′32″W	190 ft (58 m)	35°47′20″N 078°38′40″W	280 ft (85 m)	Pigeon House Branch rises in downtown Raleigh, North Carolina, on the divide between it and Rocky Branch. It then flows northeast to Crabtree Creek in northeast Raleigh.
Big Branch, left bank	3.98 square miles (10.3 km^{2})	4.70 cu ft/s (0.133 m^{3}/s)	35°49′05″N 078°37′44″W	200 ft (61 m)	35°51′54″N 078°37′44″W	400 ft (120 m)	Big Branch rises in a pond on the divide between Big Branch and Mine Creek. It then flows south to Crabtree Creek.
Beaverdam Creek, right bank	3.66 square miles (9.5 km^{2})	4.36 cu ft/s (0.123 m^{3}/s)	35°49′28″N 078°38′52″W	200 ft (61 m)	35°48′58″N 078°39′41″W	252 ft (77 m)	Beaverdam Creek is formed at the confluence of Southeast Prong and Southwest Prong of the creek. Most of the creek flows through Carolina Country Club.
Mine Creek, left bank	10.21 square miles (26.4 km^{2})	11.59 cu ft/s (0.328 m^{3}/s)	35°50′18″N 078°39′51″W	210 ft (64 m)	35°51′48″N 078°38′25″W	395 ft (120 m)	Mine Creek rises to the west of Falls of the Neuse Road in Raleigh, North Carolina, and then flows south through Shelley Lake and on to Crabtree Creek.
House Creek, right bank	2.81 square miles (7.3 km^{2})	3.36 cu ft/s (0.095 m^{3}/s)	35°50′12″N 078°40′35″W	223 ft (68 m)	35°47′59″N 078°42′00″W	425 ft (130 m)	House Creek rises in a lake on the campus of the North Carolina State University Veterinary School and then flows northeast to meet Crabtree Creek near Crabtree Mall.
Hare Snipe Creek, left bank	7.24 square miles (18.8 km^{2})	8.18 cu ft/s (0.232 m^{3}/s)	35°50′42″N 078°41′20″W	223 ft (68 m)	35°54′23″N 078°43′02″W	430 ft (130 m)	Hare Snipe Creek rises about 0.5 miles southeast of Leesville, North Carolina and then flows southeast to meet Crabtree Creek upstream of Crabtree Mall. Dammed by Lake Lynn.
Richland Creek, right bank	6.84 square miles (17.7 km^{2})	7.87 cu ft/s (0.223 m^{3}/s)	35°50′42″N 078°43′15″W	226 ft (69 m)	35°47′19″N 078°43′47″W	440 ft (130 m)	Richland Creek rises in a pond at the North Carolina State Fairgrounds and then flows north through Schenck Forest to meet Crabtree Creek about 1 mile west of Raleigh, North Carolina.
Sycamore Creek, left bank	16.31 square miles (42.2 km^{2})	17.26 cu ft/s (0.489 m^{3}/s)	35°50′47″N 078°43′33″W	230 ft (70 m)	35°56′06″N 078°45′02″W	440 ft (130 m)	Sycamore Creek rises in a pond about 0.1 miles northeast of Lynn Crossroads, North Carolina on the divide between it and Lick Creek. Sycamore Creek then flows generally southeast to meet Crabtree Creek about 1 mile west of Raleigh, North Carolina. Sycamore Creek flows most of its length through William B. Umstead State Park and has two impoundments, Big Lake and Sycamore Lake. Sycamore Creek is the second largest tributary to Crabtree Creek by both volume and drainage area.
Reedy Creek, right bank	4.44 square miles (11.5 km^{2})	5.14 cu ft/s (0.146 m^{3}/s)	35°50′27″N 078°44′36″W	243 ft (74 m)	35°47′40″N 078°45′44″W	460 ft (140 m)	Reedy Creek rises near the WPTF radio towers in Cary, North Carolina and then flows north through William B. Umstead State Park to Crabtree Creek. Reedy Creek Lake is an impoundment of this stream.
Haleys Branch, left bank	2.19 square miles (5.7 km^{2})	2.51 cu ft/s (0.071 m^{3}/s)	35°50′18″N 078°47′04″W	272 ft (83 m)	35°52′07″N 078°47′05″W	385 ft (117 m)	Haleys Branch rises just south of the Raleigh-Durham International Airport (RDU) on the Little Brier Creek divide and then flows south to meet Crabtree Creek in Lake Crabtree.
Stirrup Iron Creek, left bank	26.05 square miles (67.5 km^{2})	27.35 cu ft/s (0.774 m^{3}/s)	35°50′15″N 078°47′50″W	272 ft (83 m)	35°56′01″N 078°50′40″W	400 ft (120 m)	Stirrup Iron Creek rises in a pond by Brassfield, Granville County, North Carolina on the divide of Northeast Creek and then flows southeast to meet Crabtree Creek in Lake Crabtree. Stirrup Iron Creek is the largest tributary to Crabtree Creek by both volume and drainage area.
Coles Branch, right bank	2.60 square miles (6.7 km^{2})	3.13 cu ft/s (0.089 m^{3}/s)	35°48′10″N 078°50′02″W	305 ft (93 m)	35°46′59″N 078°48′19″W	416 ft (127 m)	Coles Branch rises in west Cary, North Carolina and then flows northwest to meet Crabtree Creek in Cary.
Turkey Creek, left bank	1.80 square miles (4.7 km^{2})	2.21 cu ft/s (0.063 m^{3}/s)	35°48′07″N 078°50′02″W	305 ft (93 m)	35°46′39″N 078°50′38″W	400 ft (120 m)	Turkey Creek rises near Upchurch, North Carolina and then flows northeast to meet Crabtree Creek in Cary, North Carolina.

== Gallery ==
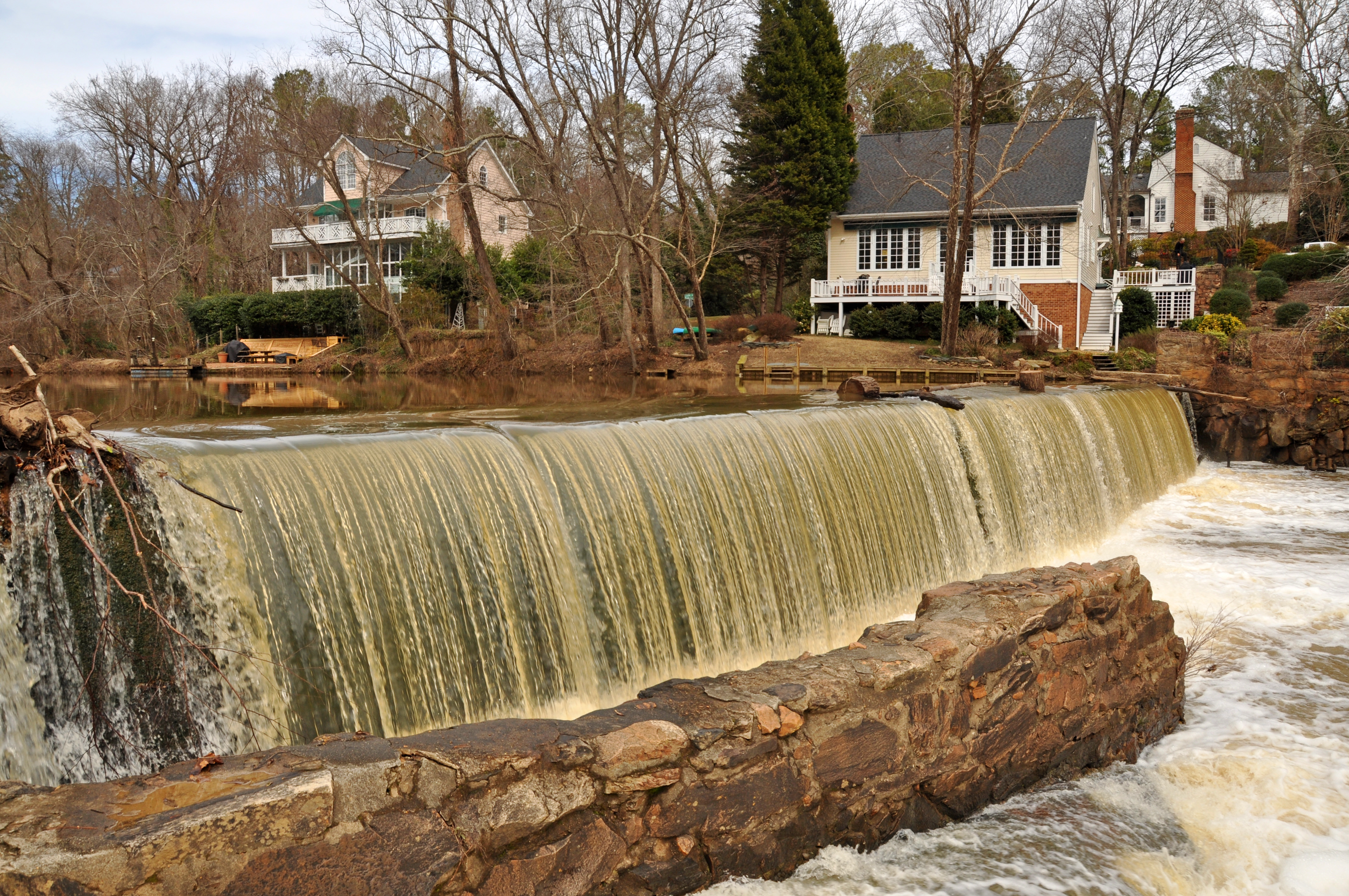
Dam across Crabtree Creek at Lassiter Mill

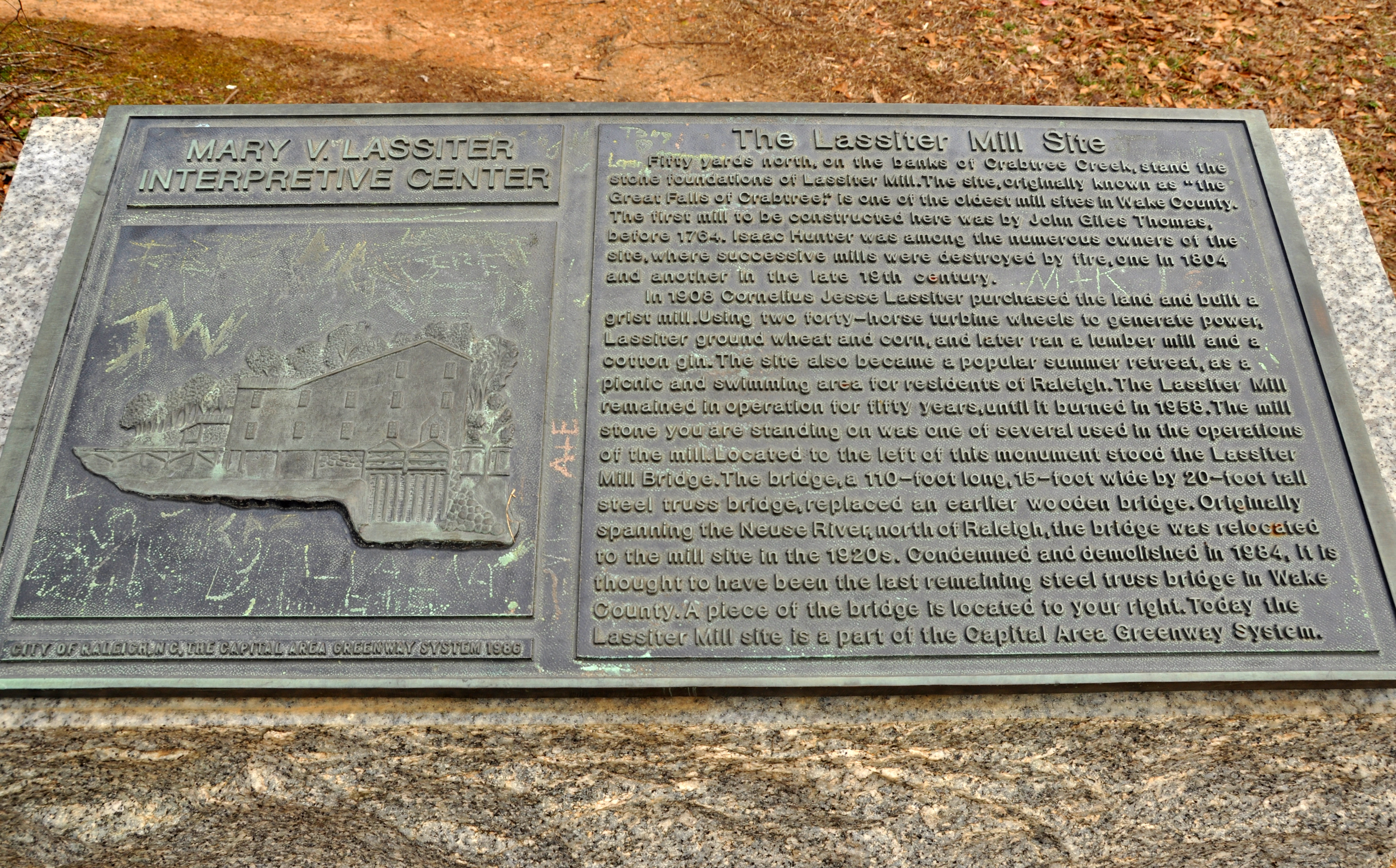
Plaque marking the site of Lassiter Mill

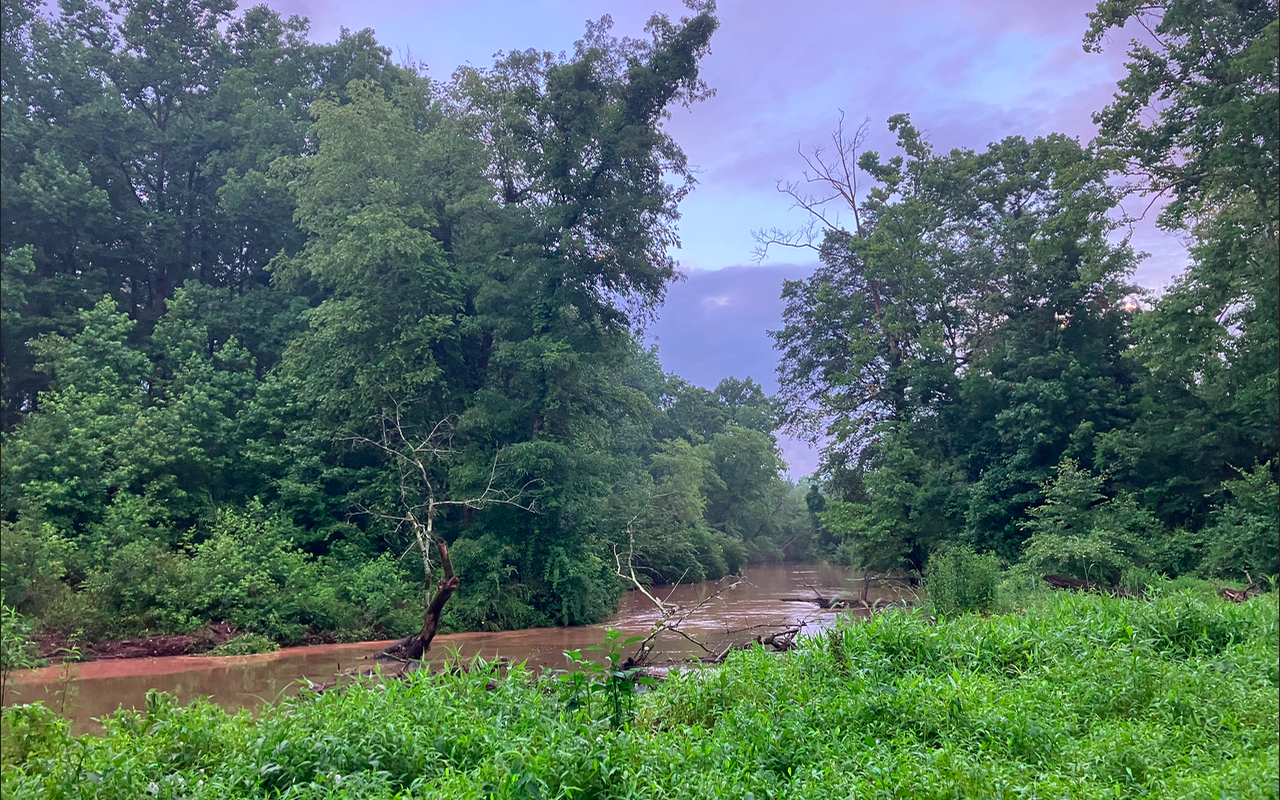
Crabtree Creek in Cary

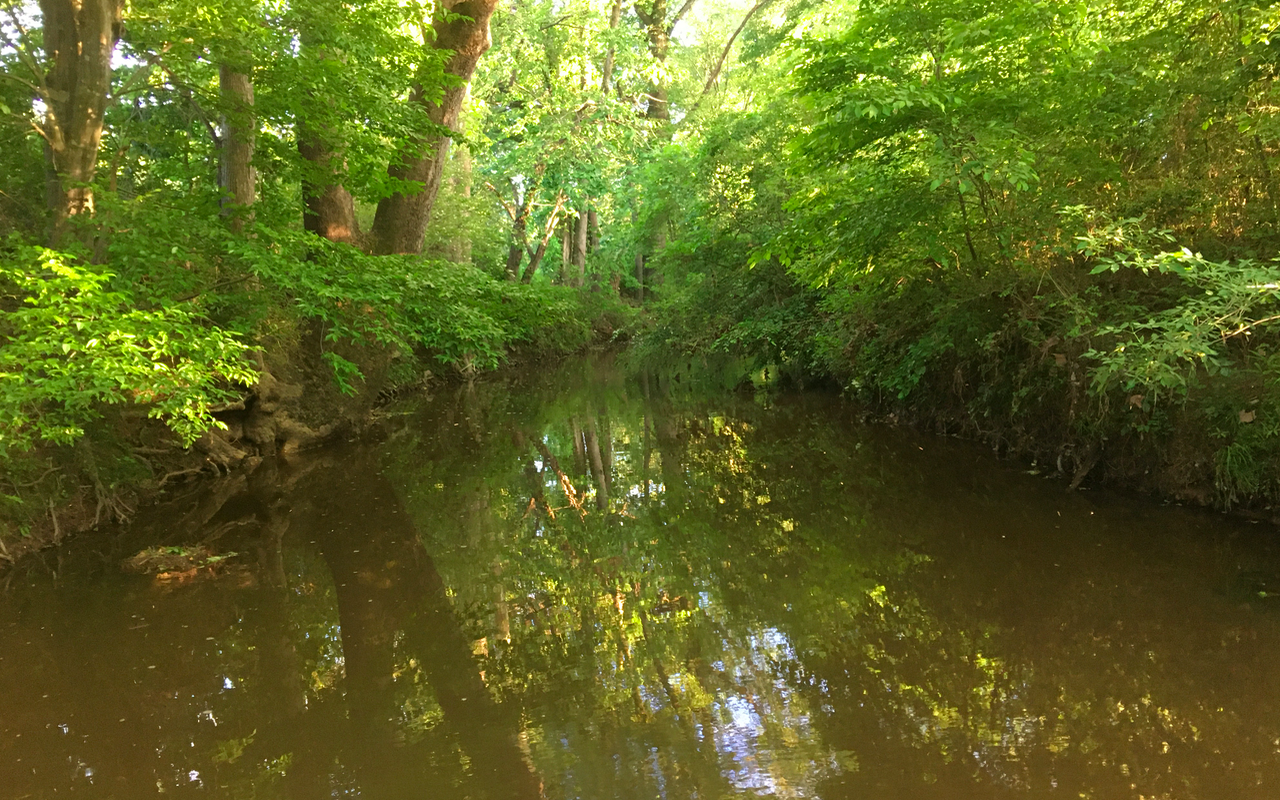
Crabtree Creek in Morrisville

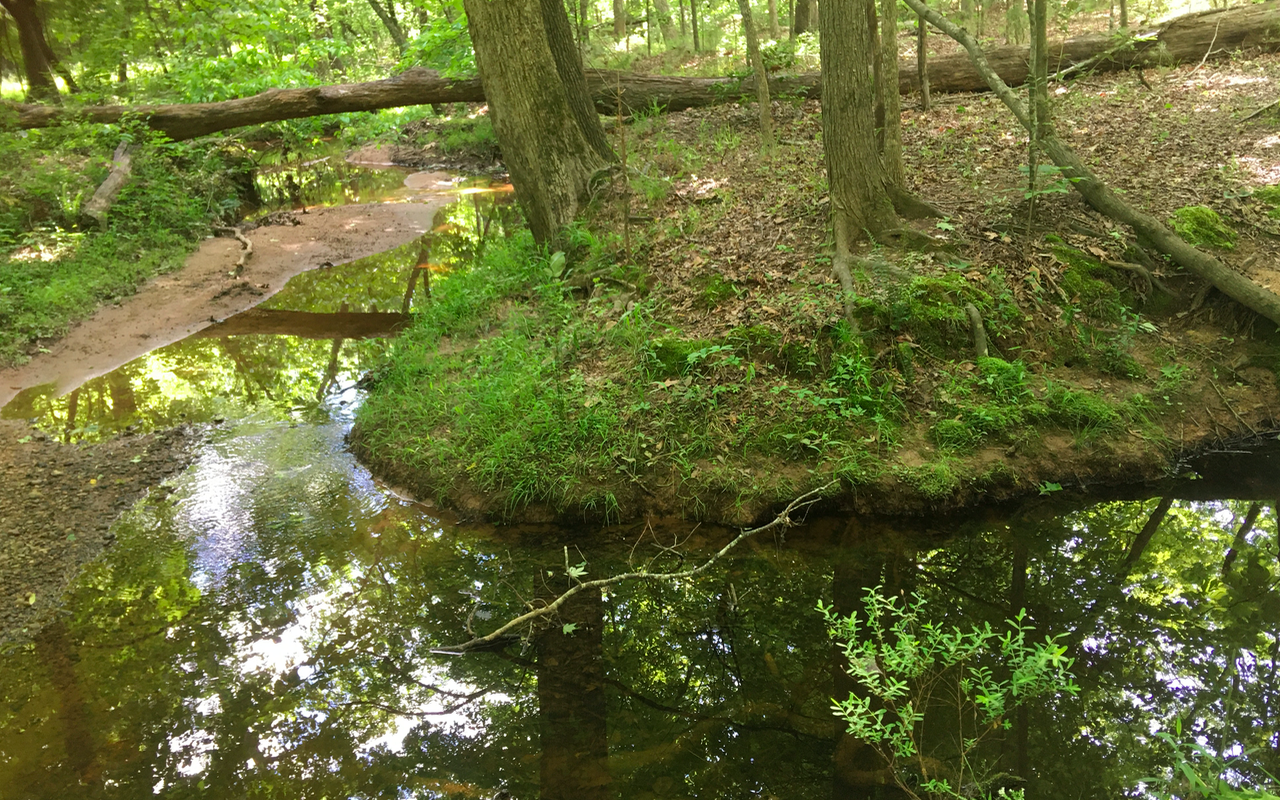
Crabtree Creek near its source
