= Crabtree (shopping mall) =

Shopping mall in North Carolina, US

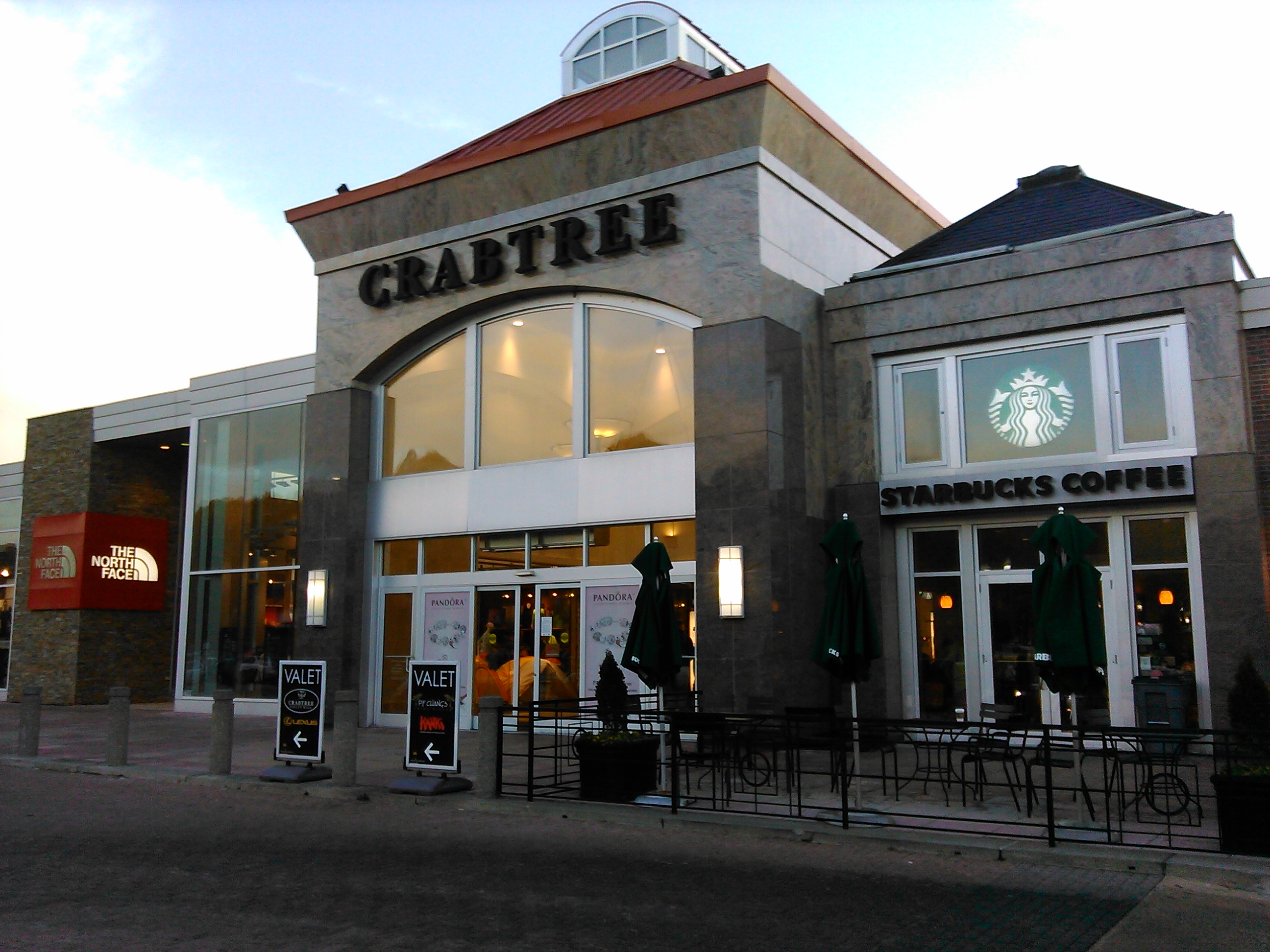
- Exterior mall entrance (2014)
- Former names: Crabtree Valley Mall

General information
- Status: Open
- Type: Shopping mall
- Coordinates: 35°50′24″N 78°40′48″W
- Opened: August 8, 1972; 54 years ago
- Owner: Macerich
- Operator: Macerich

Technical details
- Floor count: 2 (mall concourse); 3 (Belk)
- Floor area: 1,343,109 square feet (124,778.9 m^{2}) of gross leasable area

Design and construction
- Developer: Seby B. Jones; James Davidson

Other information
- Number of stores: 200
- Number of anchors: 3 (occupied); 1 (vacant)

Website
- shopcrabtree.com

Crabtree (also known as Crabtree Valley Mall) is a shopping mall in Raleigh, North Carolina, United States. The mall spans 1,343,109 square feet (124,778.9 m^{2}) of selling space, making it the largest mall in the Research Triangle area. As of 2025, the mall is anchored by Belk, Macy's, and Dick's House of Sport.

== History ==
Crabtree Valley Mall opened on August 2, 1972 at the intersection of US 70/NC 50 (Glenwood Avenue) and the I-440 Beltline. Original anchors were Hudson Belk, Sears, G.C. Murphy, Miller & Rhoads and Thalhimer's.

From the start, the mall pulled shoppers from all over central and eastern North Carolina. Many of them came to the 251,000-square-foot (23,300 m^{2}) Hudson Belk, which is still the largest store in the complex and today serves as a Belk flagship location. The mall was remodeled in the mid-1980s and added many specialty stores and a food court. It faced little competition in its market until the 1990s, when Cary Towne Center in nearby Cary doubled in size and spawned a companion mall, Crossroads Plaza.

In response, Crabtree Valley Mall embarked on a major expansion starting in 1993. G.C. Murphy, Miller & Rhoads, and Piccadilly all closed down during this period. Thalhimer's converted to Hecht's, and began planning for a new, larger location at the mall. In 1993 a 40 by 110-foot (34 m) section of the parking deck collapsed just three months after it had been completely rebuilt. Sears closed its Crabtree Valley Mall store in 1994 and opened a new location adjacent to it that August. The old Sears was reconstructed for additional stores and connected to a new, larger Hecht's, which opened in August 1995, while the original Hecht's became a Lord & Taylor.

Lord & Taylor closed in 2006. The upper level became a Belk Men's store, while the lower level was renovated as additional in-line stores, including the first H&M in North Carolina in 2010. All Hecht's stores were renamed Macy's in September 2006.

On August 22, 2018, it was announced that Sears would close. In June 2019, it was reported that the Sears store would be demolished for construction of a 30-story office tower. Cost estimates for the initial portion of the project were cited at about $290 million, with expectations to create more than 1,300 jobs. These plans eventually fell through.

In 2020, Pacific Retail assumed management of Crabtree Valley Mall, and soon after began marketing it simply as Crabtree.

On July 25, 2022, The News & Observer reported that furniture stores Pottery Barn, Arhaus, and Williams-Sonoma have closed their stores at Crabtree due to the opening of Fenton, a new shopping center that recently opened in Cary, across the street from the defunct Cary Towne Center.

On May 6, 2025, it was announced that Dick's Sporting Goods would be opening a "House of Sport" store in the former Sears anchor space. The store opened on September 30, 2026, with a grand opening from October 9-11.

On June 24, 2025, it was announced that ownership of Crabtree was acquired by California based Macerich for $290 Million. The new owners began a $60 million renovation of the mall shortly after purchasing the property. Along with these renovations, new stores have opened in the mall.

In March 2026, the Belk men's store was consolidated back into the main Belk building as part of the full remodel of the Belk building.

== Crabtree Special Police ==
Crabtree was the only mall in the Research Triangle area that had its own private police force. The force was sworn in under North Carolina General Statutes Chapter 74E, more commonly known as the Company Police Act, which gave them the power of arrest, and required them to be state certified officers as any municipal police agency. Crabtree Police officers were not allowed to carry firearms while on duty.

The force was disbanded in April 2020 after a change in mall management.

== Flooding ==
Crabtree is situated in a low spot along Crabtree Creek, a tributary of the Neuse River that begins near Morrisville and winds through Umstead State Park as well as western and North Central Raleigh. Because the watershed around the mall has become increasingly covered with impervious parking lots the creek floods easily following major storms. Such floods occurred frequently in the mall's early years, but diminished with the construction of Lake Crabtree and large retaining basins upstream of the mall. However, the problem has returned and lower levels are still likely to flood during heavy rains in the summer months.

Heavy rains caused by the remnants of Tropical Storm Alberto flooded the lower level parking lots of the mall on June 14, 2006, as well as a great deal of the bottom level of anchor stores, forcing the mall to close for the day. A similar situation occurred with Hurricane Fran in 1996, when flood waters flowed through the first floor of the mall and caused a few stores to remain closed for nearly two months.

The lower level of the parking structure along with small parts of the main building have also flooded in June 2013 and in March 2016; on July 16, 2016 an intense thunderstorm led to Crabtree Creek rose 8 feet, closing some roads that surrounded the mall and flooding parking lots. The storm left dozens stranded and cars flooded.

== Incidents ==
Crabtree has been the subject of several mass-panic events involving the mistaken perception of an active shooter due to loud, sudden noises. A widely reported event in August 2016 officially concluded with no shots fired, and no explanation as to the cause of the sudden noise despite extensive follow-up investigations and recorded noise analysis. Similar events occurred in August 2022, as well as both February and November 2023, each requiring wide-spread lockdowns, extensive police involvement, and injuries during the panic.

On July 5, 2019, a small fire burned in a Macy's fitting room. The sprinkler system extinguished the flames before firefighters arrived.
