= Reedy Creek (Crabtree Creek tributary) =

Stream in North Carolina, USA

Reedy Creek Tributary to Crabtree Creek
- Location of Reedy Creek mouth Reedy Creek (Crabtree Creek tributary) (the United States)

Location
- Country: United States
- State: North Carolina
- County: Wake
- City: Raleigh; Cary

Physical characteristics
- Source: divide between Reedy Creek and Walnut Creek
  - location: near the WPTF towers in Cary, North Carolina
  - coordinates: 35°47′40″N 078°45′44″W
  - elevation: 460 ft (140 m)
- Mouth: Crabtree Creek
  - location: William B. Umstead State Park, about 1 mile west of Raleigh, North Carolina
  - coordinates: 35°50′27″N 078°44′36″W
  - elevation: 243 ft (74 m)
- Length: 4.50 mi (7.24 km)
- Basin size: 4.44 square miles (11.5 km^{2})
- Discharge
  - location: Crabtree Creek
  - average: 5.14 cu ft/s (0.146 m^{3}/s) at mouth with Crabtree Creek

Basin features
- Progression: Crabtree Creek → Neuse River → Pamlico Sound → Atlantic Ocean
- River system: Neuse River
- Tributaries
  - left: unnamed tributaries
  - right: unnamed tributaries
- Waterbodies: Reedy Creek Lake

Reedy Creek is a 4.50 mi (7.24 km) long 2nd order tributary to Crabtree Creek in Wake County, North Carolina.

== Course ==
Reedy Creek rises near the WPTF radio towers then flows north into William B. Umstead State Park where it meets Crabtree Creek. The watershed is about 50% forested.

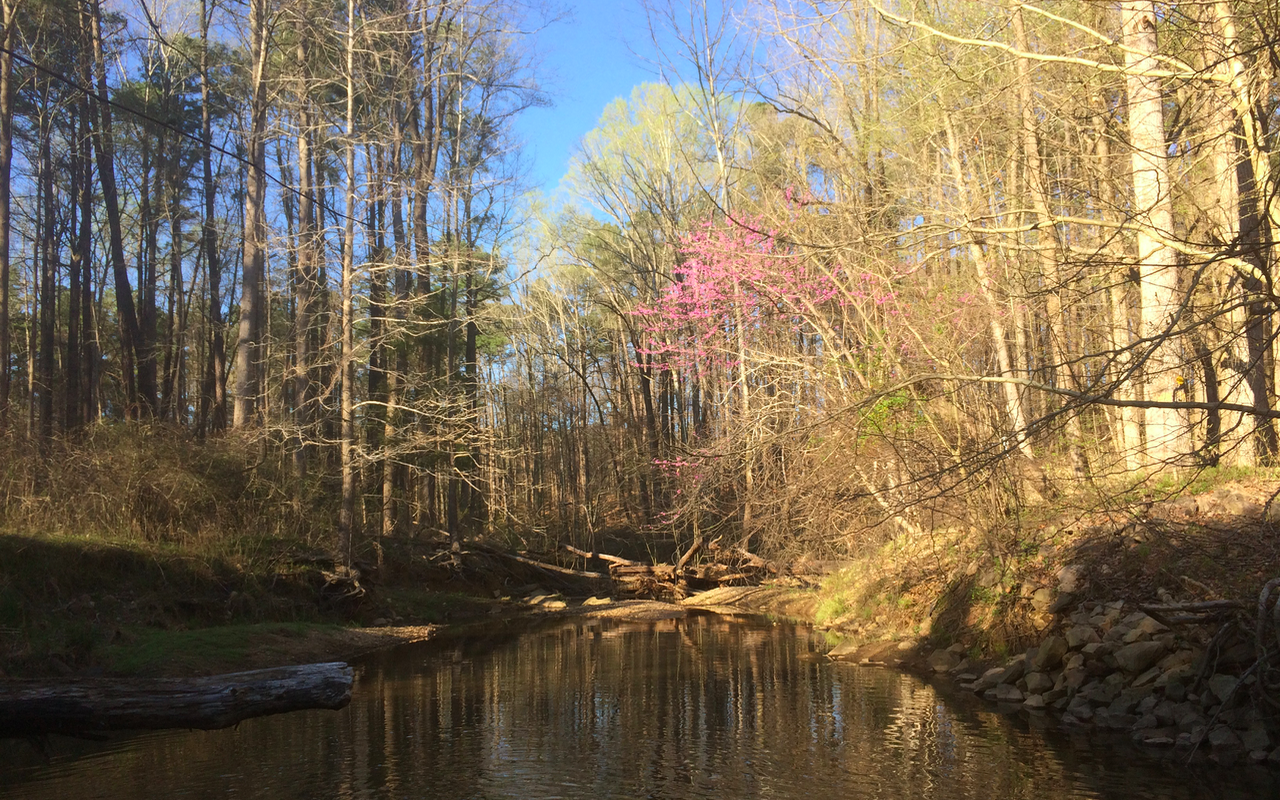
View of Reedy Creek

== Watershed ==
Reedy Creek drains 4.44 square miles (11.5 km^{2}) of area and is underlaid by the Raleigh terrane geologic formation. The watershed receives an average of 46.1 in/year of precipitation and has a wetness index of 386.39.

== See also ==
- List of rivers of North Carolina
