= Bridges Branch (Crabtree Creek tributary) =

Stream in North Carolina, USA

Bridges Branch Tributary to Crabtree Creek
- Location of Bridges Branch mouth Bridges Branch (Crabtree Creek tributary) (the United States)

Location
- Country: United States
- State: North Carolina
- County: Wake
- City: Raleigh

Physical characteristics
- Source: divide between Bridges Branch and Pigeon House Branch
  - location: Raleigh, North Carolina near St. Augustines College
  - coordinates: 35°47′15″N 078°37′08″W
  - elevation: 300 ft (91 m)
- Mouth: Crabtree Creek
  - location: Raleigh, North Carolina
  - coordinates: 35°48′13″N 078°36′30″W
  - elevation: 197 ft (60 m)
- Length: 1.26 mi (2.03 km)
- Basin size: 0.46 square miles (1.2 km^{2})
- Discharge
  - location: Crabtree Creek
  - average: 0.59 cu ft/s (0.017 m^{3}/s) at mouth with Crabtree Creek

Basin features
- Progression: Crabtree Creek → Neuse River → Pamlico Sound → Atlantic Ocean
- River system: Neuse River
- Tributaries
  - left: unnamed tributaries
  - right: unnamed tributaries
- Bridges: George Pup William Drive, Glascock Street, Barksdale Drive

Bridges Branch is a 1.26 mi (2.03 km) long tributary to Crabtree Creek in Wake County, North Carolina and is classed as a 1st order stream on the EPA waters geoviewer site.

== Course ==
Bridges Branch is the smallest named tributary to Crabtree Creek and rises in eastern Raleigh, North Carolina near St. Augustines College then flows northeast through Lions Park to meet Crabtree Creek just downstream of Pigeon House Branch. About 4% of the watershed is forested with the rest being developed.

== Watershed ==
Bridges Branch drains 0.46 square miles (1.2 km^{2}) of Raleigh Gneiss geology. The watershed receives an average of 46.7 in/year of precipitation and has a wetness index of 426.39.

== See also ==
- List of rivers of North Carolina
