= Crossroads Plaza =

Crossroads Plaza may refer to:

- Crossroads Plaza (North Carolina), US
- Crossroads Plaza (Salt Lake City), Utah, US
