= Leesville Township, Wake County, North Carolina =

Township in Wake County, North Carolina, U.S.

Coordinates: 35.9141245°N 78.713608°W

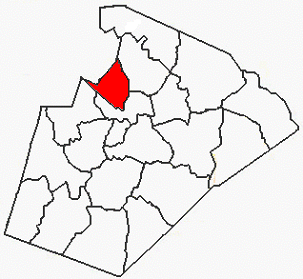

Leesville Township (also designated Township 8) is one of twenty townships within Wake County, North Carolina, United States. As of the 2010 United States census, Leesville Township had a population of 41,850, a 39.5% increase over 2000.

Leesville Township, occupying 21.4 square miles (55.4 km^{2}) in northwestern Wake County, includes portions of the city of Raleigh. It is approximately bounded by the Durham County line, Glenwood Ave (US 70), Millbrook Rd (SR 1822), Leesville Rd (SR 1839), Ray Rd (SR 1826), Howard Rd (SR 1828), Creedmoor Rd (NC 50), and Old Creedmoor Rd (SR 1831)
