= Lake Lynn (Raleigh, North Carolina) =

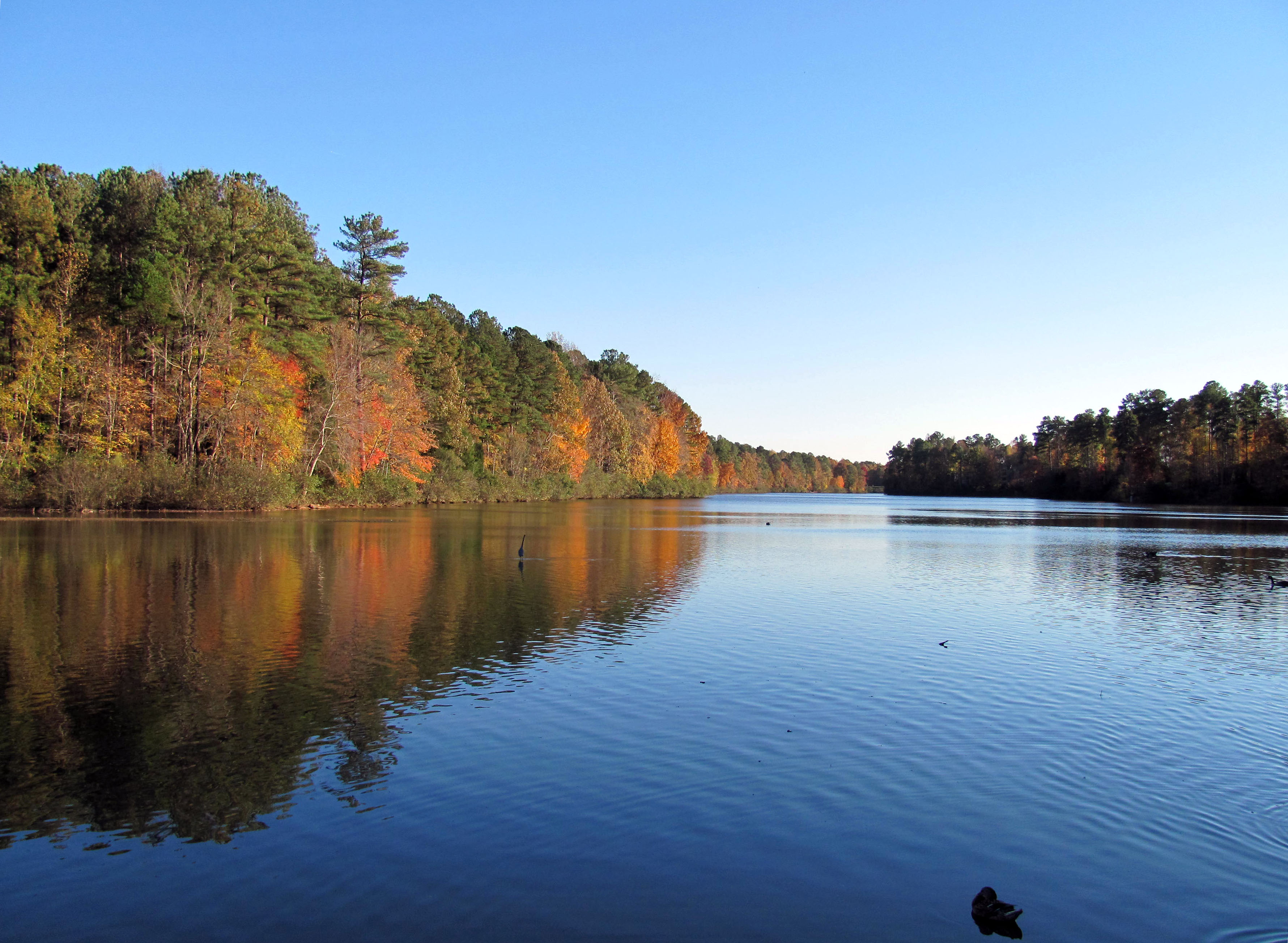
- Lake Lynn in November, looking south toward the dam

- Location within North Carolina
- Location: Wake County, North Carolina
- Coordinates: 35°52′41″N 78°41′56″W
- Type: man-made lake
- Basin countries: United States
- Surface area: 55.7 acres (22.5 ha)
- Surface elevation: 384 ft (117 m)

Lake Lynn is a man-made lake in Raleigh, North Carolina. The lake was created for flood control purposes in 1976 by damming Hare Snipe Creek, a tributary of Crabtree Creek. The lake has an area of 55.7 acres (22.5 ha) and lies entirely within the city of Raleigh's 75-acre (30 ha) Lake Lynn Park. The park includes a 2.8 mi (4.5 km) paved trail around the lake (part of the Capital Area Greenway system), as well as a community center, playground, and tennis courts.

Lake Lynn Dam (also named Crabtree Watershed Dam #22b), is a 42 foot (13 m) high, 620 foot (190 m) long earth dam.

== Wildlife ==
Lake Lynn has an aquatic wildlife that includes common varieties of lake fish found in North Carolina. Turtles are also commonly seen in the shallower parts of the lake and it is not uncommon to see the turtles come out of the lake on a sunny day. Snakes and birds are also commonly seen around this mini ecosystem.

== See also ==
- Crabtree Creek (Neuse River)
- William B. Umstead State Park
- Eno River State Park
- Falls Lake State Recreation Area
