= Township 8 =

Township 8 may refer to:

- Leesville Township, Wake County, North Carolina
- Township 8, Benton County, Arkansas
- Township 8, Rooks County, Kansas
