= Richland Creek (Crabtree Creek tributary) =

Stream in North Carolina, USA

Richland Creek Tributary to Crabtree Creek
- Location of Richland Creek mouth Richland Creek (Crabtree Creek tributary) (the United States)

Location
- Country: United States
- State: North Carolina
- County: Wake
- City: Raleigh

Physical characteristics
- Source: Pond at the North Carolina State Fairgrounds in Raleigh, North Carolina
  - location: Raleigh, North Carolina
  - coordinates: 35°47′19″N 078°43′47″W
  - elevation: 440 ft (130 m)
- Mouth: Crabtree Creek
  - location: Raleigh, North Carolina
  - coordinates: 35°50′42″N 078°43′15″W
  - elevation: 236 ft (72 m)
- Length: 5.25 mi (8.45 km)
- Basin size: 6.84 square miles (17.7 km^{2})
- Discharge
  - location: Crabtree Creek
  - average: 7.87 cu ft/s (0.223 m^{3}/s) at mouth with Crabtree Creek

Basin features
- Progression: Crabtree Creek → Neuse River → Pamlico Sound → Atlantic Ocean
- River system: Neuse River
- Tributaries
  - left: unnamed tributaries
  - right: unnamed tributaries
- Waterbodies: unnamed waterbodies

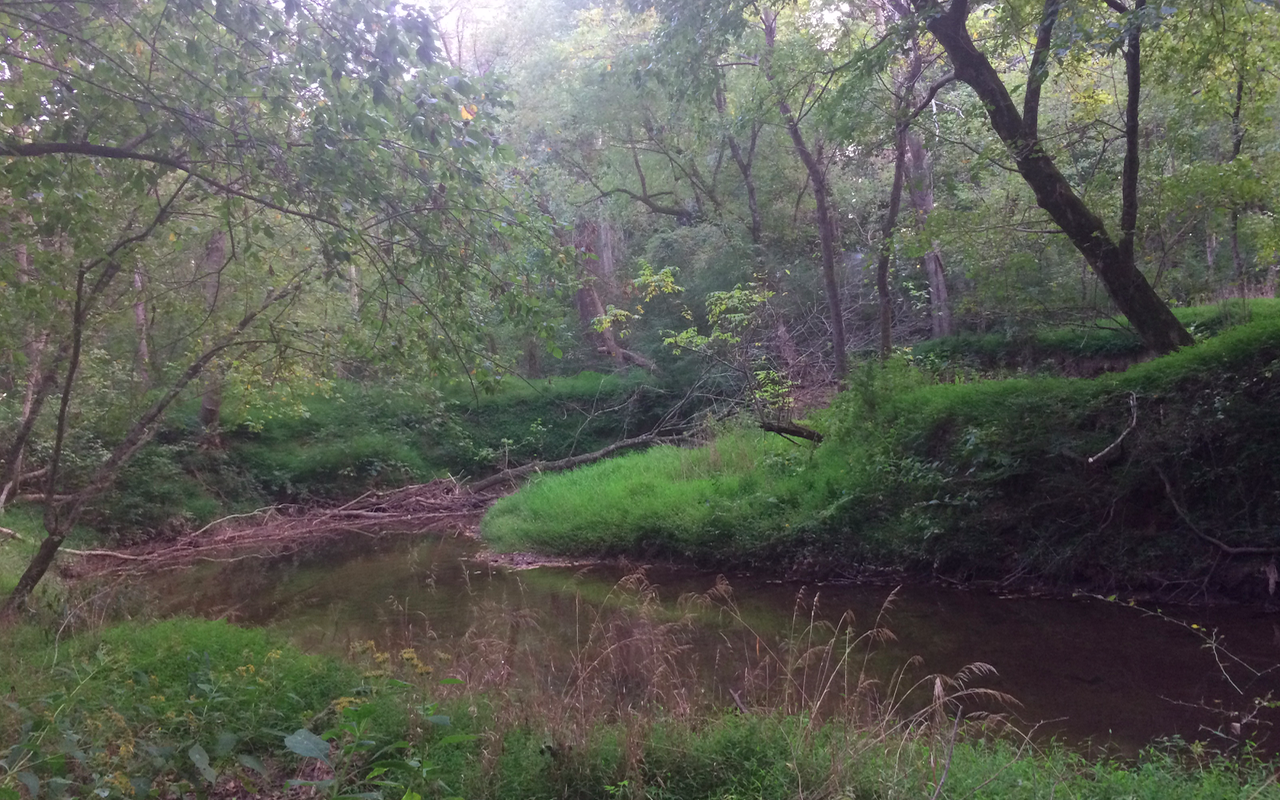
Richland Creek in Umstead State Park

Richland Creek is a 5.25 mi (8.45 km) long 2nd order tributary to Crabtree Creek in Raleigh, North Carolina that rises in a pond on the North Carolina State Fairgrounds. The creek then flows north across I-40 and through Schenck Forest to eventually join Crabtree Creek. The watershed is mainly developed with about 30% of it forested.

== Course ==
Richland Creek rises in a pond on the North Carolina State Fairgrounds and then flows north across I-40 and through Schenck Forest to join Crabtree Creek. The watershed is about 30% forested.

== Watershed ==
Reedy Creek drains 4.44 square miles (11.5 km^{2}) of area and is underlaid by the Raleigh terrane geologic formation. The watershed receives an average of 46.3 in/year of precipitation and has a wetness index of 407.29.

== Development ==
In 2024, Pacific Elm Properties and the Carolina Hurricanes requested rezoning for a proposed Raleigh Sports and Entertainment District. The proposal included a mixed-use subdistrict, Zone C, with retail, residential and office space along the creek, with buildings up to 40 stories high.

The Triangle Land Conservancy has helped to preserve two areas along the creek, one at the site of the proposed Duraleigh Connector and one at the former Walton Farm at the boundary of Umstead Park.

== Wastewater ==
In March 2021, over 57,000 gallons of raw sewage spilled from a manhole near a tributary of the creek in West Raleigh. The spill was attributed to "wipes and rope in a sewer gravity main."

In July 2021, heavy rainfall from Tropical Storm Elsa caused 62,000 gallons of untreated wastewater to spill into a tributary of the creek in Franklin County.

== See also ==
- List of rivers of North Carolina
