= House Creek (Crabtree Creek tributary) =

Stream in North Carolina, USA

House Creek Tributary to Crabtree Creek
- Location of House Creek mouth House Creek (Crabtree Creek tributary) (the United States)

Location
- Country: United States
- State: North Carolina
- County: Wake
- City: Raleigh

Physical characteristics
- Source: divide between House Creek and Walnut Creek
  - location: Lake on the North Carolina State University Veterinary Science School
  - coordinates: 35°47′59″N 078°42′00″W
  - elevation: 425 ft (130 m)
- Mouth: Crabtree Creek
  - location: Raleigh, North Carolina near Crabtree Valley Mall
  - coordinates: 35°50′12″N 078°40′35″W
  - elevation: 223 ft (68 m)
- Length: 3.22 mi (5.18 km)
- Basin size: 2.81 square miles (7.3 km^{2})
- Discharge
  - location: Crabtree Creek
  - average: 3.36 cu ft/s (0.095 m^{3}/s) at mouth with Crabtree Creek

Basin features
- Progression: Crabtree Creek → Neuse River → Pamlico Sound → Atlantic Ocean
- River system: Neuse River
- Tributaries
  - left: unnamed tributaries
  - right: unnamed tributaries

House Creek is a 3.22 mi (5.18 km) long 1st order tributary of Crabtree Creek in Wake County, North Carolina.

== Course ==
House Creek rises in western Raleigh, North Carolina and flows northeast to meet Crabtree Creek near Crabtree Valley Mall. The watershed is about 50% forested.

In 2021, the City of Raleigh replaced a culvert at Blue Ridge Road to allow the creek to drain adequately to Crabtree Creek.

== Watershed ==
House Creek drains 2.81 square miles (7.3 km^{2}) of area and is underlaid by the Crabtree terrane geologic formation. The watershed receives an average of 46.5 in/year of precipitation and has a wetness index of 389.18. The watershed is about 12% forested.

== See also ==
- List of rivers of North Carolina
