= Sycamore Creek (Crabtree Creek tributary) =

Stream in North Carolina, USA

Sycamore Creek Tributary to Crabtree Creek
- Location of Sycamore Creek mouth Sycamore Creek (Crabtree Creek tributary) (the United States)

Location
- Country: United States
- State: North Carolina
- County: Wake; Durham

Physical characteristics
- Source: divide between Sycamore Creek and Lick Creek
  - location: about 0.1 miles northeast of Lynns Crossroads, North Carolina
  - coordinates: 35°56′06″N 078°45′02″W
  - elevation: 440 ft (130 m)
- Mouth: Crabtree Creek
  - location: about 1 mile west of Raleigh, North Carolina
  - coordinates: 35°50′47″N 078°43′33″W
  - elevation: 230 ft (70 m)
- Length: 9.39 mi (15.11 km)
- Basin size: 16.31 square miles (42.2 km^{2})
- Discharge
  - location: Crabtree Creek
  - average: 17.26 cu ft/s (0.489 m^{3}/s) at mouth with Crabtree Creek

Basin features
- Progression: Crabtree Creek → Neuse River → Pamlico Sound → Atlantic Ocean
- River system: Neuse River
- Tributaries
  - left: Pots Branch; Turkey Branch
- Waterbodies: Big Lake; Sycamore Lake

Sycamore Creek is a tributary to Crabtree Creek that rises in a pond near Lynns Crossroads in Durham County then flows southward to join Crabtree Creek in Wake County, North Carolina. Sycamore Creek flows mostly through William B. Umstead State Park. The watershed is more forested at 43% than most in the Crabtree Creek watershed.

In 2026 the development company Mill Creek sought to rezone a section of the land between Leesville and Shady Grove roads. Concerns have been raised over the wetland environment where Sycamore Creek passes through the middle of the 32 acre plot.

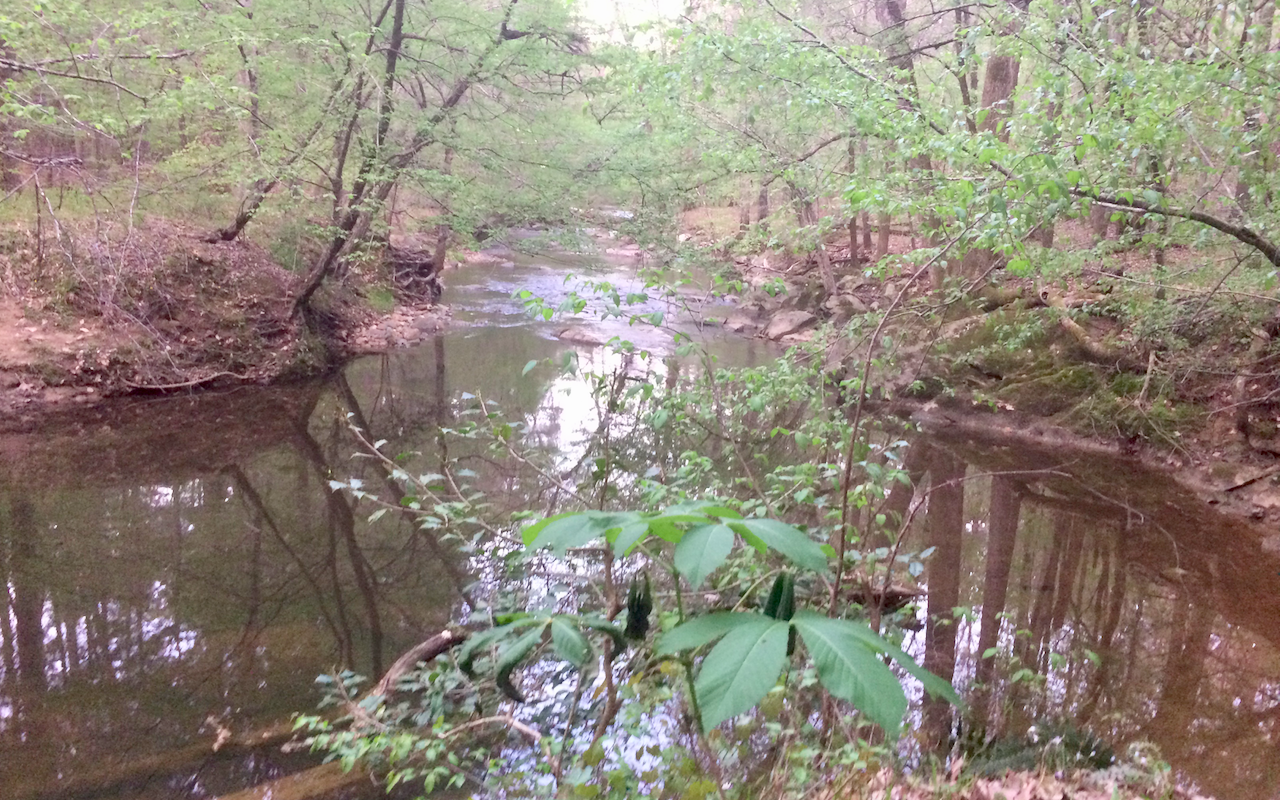
Sycamore Creek

== See also ==
- List of rivers of North Carolina
