= Hare Snipe Creek =

Stream in North Carolina, USA

Hare Snipe Creek Tributary to Crabtree Creek
- Location of Hare Snipe Creek mouth Hare Snipe Creek (the United States)

Location
- Country: United States
- State: North Carolina
- County: Wake
- City: Raleigh

Physical characteristics
- Source: divide between Hare Snipe Creek and Lower Barton Creek
  - location: about 0.5 miles southeast of Leesville, North Carolina
  - coordinates: 35°54′23″N 078°43′02″W
  - elevation: 430 ft (130 m)
- Mouth: Crabtree Creek
  - location: Raleigh, North Carolina
  - coordinates: 35°50′42″N 078°41′20″W
  - elevation: 223 ft (68 m)
- Length: 5.23 mi (8.42 km)
- Basin size: 7.24 square miles (18.8 km^{2})
- Discharge
  - location: Crabtree Creek
  - average: 8.18 cu ft/s (0.232 m^{3}/s) at mouth with Crabtree Creek

Basin features
- Progression: Crabtree Creek → Neuse River → Pamlico Sound → Atlantic Ocean
- River system: Neuse River
- Tributaries
  - left: unnamed tributaries
  - right: unnamed tributaries
- Waterbodies: Lake Lynn

Hare Snipe Creek is a tributary of Crabtree Creek that rises in the northern Raleigh, North Carolina. The creek then flows south to Lake Lynn and on to Crabtree Creek. The watershed is about 19% forested.

== Wastewater ==
In June of 2018, approximately 364,000 gallons of untreated wastewater were released into a tributary of the creek because erosion of the stream's banks led to a broken sewer main.

In August of 2021, a damaged pipe caused about 6,300 gallons of sewage to spill and enter the Creek north of Crabtree Valley Mall.

== See also ==
- List of rivers of North Carolina
