= Haleys Branch (Crabtree Creek tributary) =

Stream in North Carolina, USA

Haleys Branch Tributary to Crabtree Creek
- Location of Haleys Branch mouth Haleys Branch (Crabtree Creek tributary) (the United States)

Location
- Country: United States
- State: North Carolina
- County: Wake
- City: Raleigh

Physical characteristics
- Source: divide between Haleys Branch and Little Brier Creek
  - location: just south of Raleigh-Durham (RDU) airport
  - coordinates: 35°52′07″N 078°47′05″W
  - elevation: 358 ft (109 m)
- Mouth: Crabtree Creek
  - location: Lake Crabtree
  - coordinates: 35°50′18″N 078°47′04″W
  - elevation: 272 ft (83 m)
- Length: 2.33 mi (3.75 km)
- Basin size: 2.19 square miles (5.7 km^{2})
- Discharge
  - location: Crabtree Creek
  - average: 2.51 cu ft/s (0.071 m^{3}/s) at mouth with Crabtree Creek

Basin features
- Progression: Crabtree Creek → Neuse River → Pamlico Sound → Atlantic Ocean
- River system: Neuse River
- Tributaries
  - left: unnamed tributaries
  - right: unnamed tributaries
- Waterbodies: Lake Crabtree

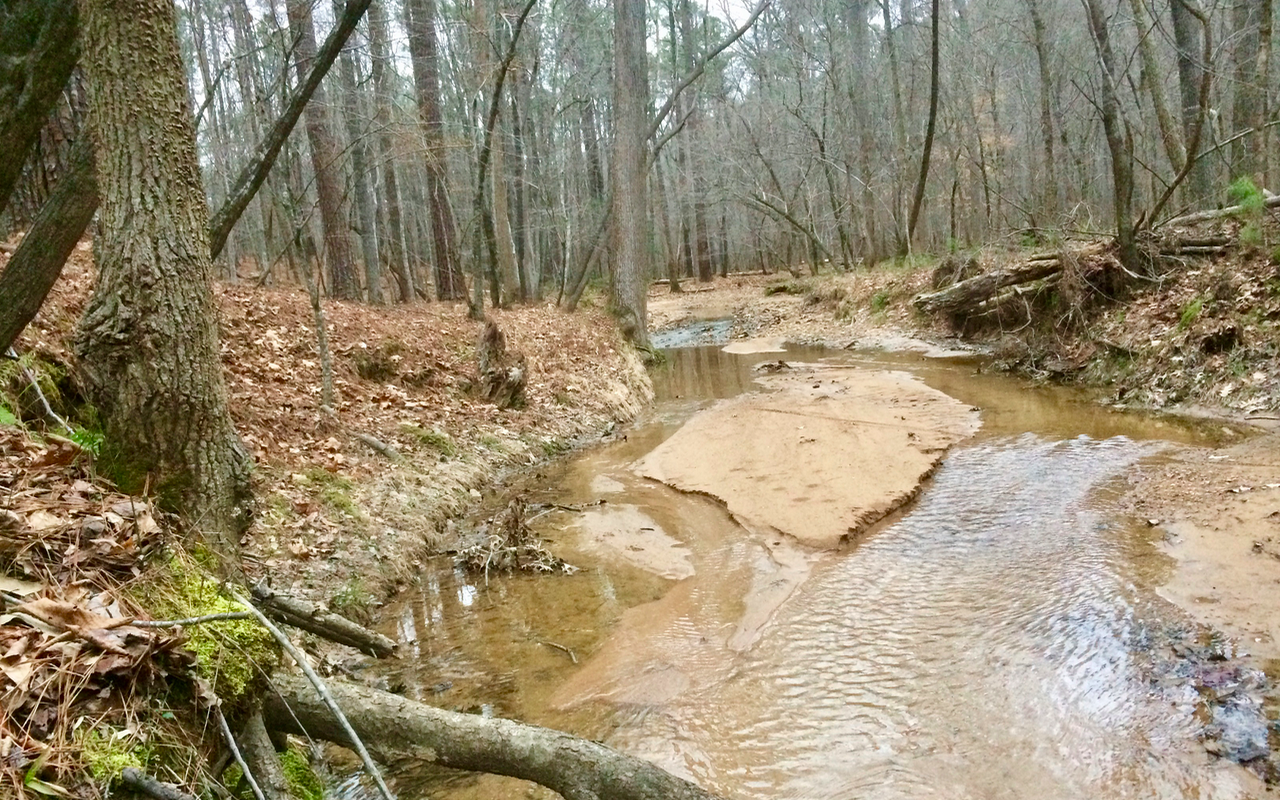
Haleys Branch

Haleys Branch is a tributary to Crabtree Creek that rises just south of the Raleigh-Durham (RDU) airport then flows south to meet Crabtree Creek in Lake Crabtree. The watershed is about 68% forested.

In 2024, residents expressed concern that new parking at RDU would pollute the creek, in spite of the planned use of submerged gravel wetlands and other measures to control stormwater runoff. The Umstead Coalition questioned the effectiveness of the measures and requested monitoring of the water quality in Haleys Branch.

== See also ==
- List of rivers of North Carolina
