= Big Branch (Crabtree Creek tributary) =

Stream in North Carolina, USA

Big Branch Tributary to Crabtree Creek
- Location of Big Branch mouth Big Branch (Crabtree Creek tributary) (the United States)

Location
- Country: United States
- State: North Carolina
- County: Wake
- City: Raleigh

Physical characteristics
- Source: divide between Big Branch and Mine Creek
  - location: Raleigh, North Carolina near Falls of the Neuse Road
  - coordinates: 35°51′54″N 78°37′44″W
  - elevation: 400 ft (120 m)
- Mouth: Crabtree Creek
  - location: Raleigh, North Carolina
  - coordinates: 35°49′02″N 78°37′44″W
  - elevation: 200 ft (61 m)
- Length: 3.59 mi (5.78 km)
- Basin size: 3.98 square miles (10.3 km^{2})
- Discharge
  - location: Crabtree Creek
  - average: 4.70 cu ft/s (0.133 m^{3}/s) at mouth with Crabtree Creek

Basin features
- Progression: Crabtree Creek → Neuse River → Pamlico Sound → Atlantic Ocean
- River system: Neuse River
- Tributaries
  - left: unnamed tributaries
  - right: unnamed tributaries
- Bridges: Shanda Drive, Spring Forest Road, Maple Ridge Road, East Millbrook Road, Purdue Street, Compton Road, Hardimont Road, St. Albans Drive, US 1, Cheswick Drive, Six Forks Road

Big Branch is a 3.59 mi (5.78 km) long tributary of Crabtree Creek in Wake County, North Carolina, and is classed as a 2nd order stream on the EPA waters geoviewer site.

== Course ==
Big Branch rises in northern Raleigh, North Carolina, then flows south to meet Crabtree Creek across from Kiwanis Park. It is a developed watershed with only 7% of the watershed considered to be forested.

== Watershed ==
Big Branch drains 3.98 square miles (10.3 km^{2}) of area. The upper part of the watershed is underlain by Falls Leucogneiss. The middle and lower watershed is underlain by Raleigh Gneiss geology. The watershed receives an average of 46.5 in/year of precipitation and has a wetness index of 415.15.

== Development ==
In 2021, the creek featured prominently in Kane Realty's proposal for the North Hills Innovation District. The creek runs through the middle of the district and forms a key feature of the district's outdoor space.

Also in 2021, the Interstate 40 (I-40) bridge over the creek was identified by the American Road & Transportation Builders Association as one of the six most-traveled bridges in North Carolina that was also "structurally deficient."

== Wastewater ==
In November 2020, heavy rains caused 87,780 gallons of sewage to overflow from a manhole; the sewage entered a tributary of Big Branch Creek.

In November 2018, heavy rains caused 220,000 of untreated wastewater to be discharged into a tributary of Big Branch Creek.

== See also ==
- List of rivers of North Carolina
