= Mine Creek (Crabtree Creek tributary) =

Stream in North Carolina, USA

Mine Creek Tributary to Crabtree Creek
- Location of Mine Creek mouth Mine Creek (Crabtree Creek tributary) (the United States)

Location
- Country: United States
- State: North Carolina
- County: Wake
- City: Raleigh

Physical characteristics
- Source: divide between Mine Creek and Perry Creek
  - location: Raleigh, North Carolina near Falls of the Neuse Road
  - coordinates: 35°51′48″N 078°38′25″W
  - elevation: 395 ft (120 m)
- Mouth: Crabtree Creek
  - location: Raleigh, North Carolina
  - coordinates: 35°50′18″N 078°39′51″W
  - elevation: 210 ft (64 m)
- Length: 4.58 mi (7.37 km)
- Basin size: 10.21 square miles (26.4 km^{2})
- Discharge
  - location: Crabtree Creek
  - average: 11.59 cu ft/s (0.328 m^{3}/s) at mouth with Crabtree Creek

Basin features
- Progression: Crabtree Creek → Neuse River → Pamlico Sound → Atlantic Ocean
- River system: Neuse River
- Tributaries
  - left: unnamed tributaries
  - right: unnamed tributaries
- Waterbodies: Shelley Lake

Mine Creek is a tributary of Crabtree Creek that rises in northern Raleigh, North Carolina. The creek then flows southwest to Shelley Lake and then south to Crabtree Creek. The watershed is about 19% forested.

In 2020, the City of Raleigh replaced the pedestrian bridge located about 100 feet upstream from where Mine Creek joins Crabtree Creek.

== See also ==
- List of rivers of North Carolina
