= Cary Towne Center =

Former shopping mall in Cary, North Carolina, United States

Coordinates: 35.773153°N 78.759087°W

- Location: Cary, North Carolina, United States
- Address: 1105 Walnut Street
- Opened: February 21, 1979
- Closed: January 31, 2021
- Demolished: March–April 2022
- Previous names: Cary Village Mall (1979–1991)
- Developer: Seby Jones and J.W. York
- Owner: Epic Games
- Num. of anchor tenants: 5 (all vacant)
- Floor area: 1,004,210 square feet (93,294 m^{2}).
- Floors: 1 (2 in former Belk, former Dillards, and former Macy's)
- Parking: 4,868 spaces
- Website: Archived official website at the Wayback Machine (archived January 30, 2021)

Cary Towne Center was an indoor shopping mall in Cary, North Carolina. It was anchored by Belk, Dillard's, Macy's, JCPenney, and Sears. It opened as Cary Village Mall in 1979, and was expanded and renamed in 1991. The mall, after years of struggle, closed in January 2021, eventually being demolished in Spring 2022.

== History ==
=== Cary Village Mall ===
Originally planned in 1972, the mall was first proposed as the adjacent Cary Village Mall and Cary Village Square projects, part of a $25 million Village Center by local developers Seby Jones (who built Crabtree Mall and J.W. York (who built Cameron Village). Village Center was to be a 78-acre (320,000 m^{2}), 75 store project including 3 office buildings as well as a (never built) motel. Cary Village Center fills the intersection between Maynard Road (a loop around central Cary), Walnut Street, and Cary Towne Boulevard (originally Western Boulevard Extension), the latter two of which continue to nearby freeways. The enclosed mall was built on the eastern part of the site, with office buildings at the center and two open-air retail pavilions on the north, separated by Cary Towne Boulevard.

The request to rezone the area to allow construction of the mall drew much controversy from nearby residents calling themselves "Citizens for the Better Direction of Cary" who worried about increased traffic as well as the property's proximity to Cary High School, Henry Adams School, and East Cary School. The group hired an attorney and pressured the town council to closely monitor the development causing York to complain that everything had to be approved "10 times".

Cary Village Mall opened on February 21, 1979, with 325,000 square feet (30,200 m^{2}) of retail space anchored by Ivey's (purchased by Dillard's in 1990) and Hudson Belk (now Belk) as well as outbuildings occupied by Big Star Markets (later Harris Teeter). The mall's design was a modified pinwheel with four wings, three either parallel to or facing the three streets around it, and a fourth facing to the rear of the mall where additional land remained for future expansion. At the center of the pinwheel was a sunken, triangular food court. A large southern red oak tree on the expansion land became an unofficial mascot of the mall, and was retained on a raised terrace at the considerable expense even after the mall parking area grew around it. The tree died a few years later and its terrace was removed and the location added to the parking lot.

=== Expansion/transition to Cary Towne Center ===
In 1988, the mall applied for a zoning change for a major expansion, perhaps spurred by proposals for a "mega-mall" at Crossroads Plaza emerged only a mile away. In 1991, the mall completed its expansion to 1.1 million square feet and was renamed Cary Towne Center by then-owners Richard E. Jacobs Group.

The new mall included a food court adjacent to the oak tree, a Center Court with palm trees, and three new anchors: Thalhimers, JCPenney, and Sears. In 1992, Dillard's opened a new, larger store adjacent to its original building, which became inline shops. A year later, Thalhimer's became Hecht's in 1993, which became Macy's in 2006.

In 1995, Barnes & Noble officially opened across the street from Cary Towne Center.

In 2001, the mall was sold to CBL & Associates Properties as part of a portfolio of 21 properties in nine states.

=== Changes in retail landscape ===
On November 6, 2013, Dave & Buster's opened in the mall. Harris Teeter moved across the street in October 2014 to a larger location, later replaced with Jumpstreet, an indoor trampoline, bounce house, and entertainment complex.

Sears closed its Cary Towne location in January 2015, citing continual financial struggles on the corporate level. In 2015, Topgolf sought zoning approval from the town to open in what had been the Sears space. However, plans were later withdrawn due to concerns over lighting and noise issues with a nearby neighborhood. Macy's closed its location in early 2016 due to disappointing sales and earnings performance. The Sears space was filled in May 2016 by a local furniture store, Cary Towne Furniture.

On January 31, 2019, JCPenney announced that they would close their Cary Towne Center location as part of a plan to close 27 stores nationwide; the store closed by May 3, 2019. On July 12, 2019, Dillard's announced it was closing its Cary Towne Center store by December, according to a notification filed with the State of North Carolina.

=== Decline and transformation ===
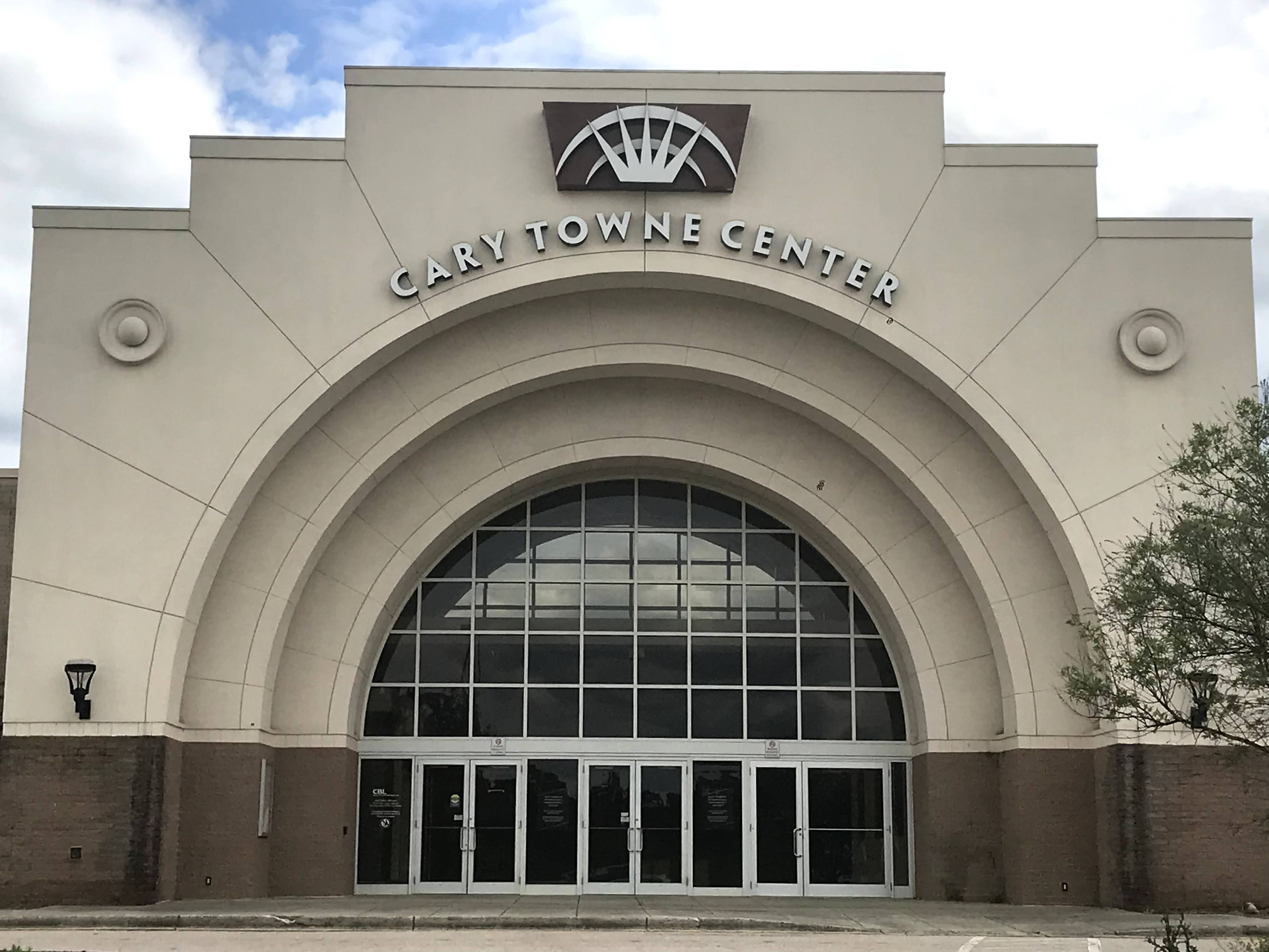
Cary Towne Center (after closing)

Plans had been in the works to transform Cary Towne Center from a traditional mall to a mixed-used development for many years. Spurred on by an announcement made by IKEA to open a 350,000-square-foot store in 2020 where Sears and Macy's were once located, CBL began the rezoning process alongside the Town of Cary to redevelop the property. The submitted mixed use proposal included retail (352,000 SF), residential (800 dwelling units), office (600,000 SF), hotel (600 rooms) and community spaces. However, in late May 2018, IKEA reversed its earlier plans and publicly announced the retailer was no longer coming to Cary because of the retail apocalypse. As a result, CBL announced that it had defaulted on the mall's mortgage and was going to sell the mall. On January 31, 2019, Turnbridge Equities and Denali Properties announced they had purchased the mall.

Turnbridge and Denali announced plans in October 2020 to close and demolish Cary Towne Mall to transform it into a mixed-use project called Carolina Yards, which would include retail, hotel, residential, and office space, along with plenty of open outdoor space for gatherings, recreation, and events. However, it was announced in January 2021 that Epic Games had acquired Cary Towne Center for $95 million from Turnbridge and Denali, with the goal of transforming the property into its new headquarters campus by 2024, including facilities for both office buildings and recreational spaces. While Belk was to initially stay open during the Carolina Yards transformation, the store closed on January 30, 2021 following the mall’s purchase from Epic Games. The store did not have a closing sale and most of the store’s merchandise was transferred to other Belk locations.

The mall closed permanently on January 31, 2021 with the exception of Dave & Buster's, which planned to remain in the new Epic headquarters campus, relocating to a new site. As of January 17, 2022, Dave & Buster's opened in its relocated site in the former JumpStreet trampoline park at 1111 Walnut Street.

Demolition began in March 2022 and was completed by the end of April. However, work has stalled following demolition with no updates from Epic Games. In January 2025, Epic Games announced that the town of Cary has withdrawn their zoning request after more than three years of inactivity. As of April 2026, the site still stands vacant with only the former Belk building still intact, and future plans are unknown.
