= Stirrup Iron Creek =

Stream in North Carolina, USA

Stirrup Iron Creek Tributary to Crabtree Creek
- Location of Stirrup Iron Creek mouth Stirrup Iron Creek (the United States)

Location
- Country: United States
- State: North Carolina
- County: Wake; Durham
- City: Cary

Physical characteristics
- Source: divide between Stirrup Iron Creek and Northeast Creek
  - location: pond by Brassfield, North Carolina
  - coordinates: 35°56′01″N 078°50′40″W
  - elevation: 400 ft (120 m)
- Mouth: Crabtree Creek
  - location: Lake Crabtree
  - coordinates: 35°50′15″N 078°47′50″W
  - elevation: 272 ft (83 m)
- Length: 9.12 mi (14.68 km)
- Basin size: 26.05 square miles (67.5 km^{2})
- Discharge
  - location: Crabtree Creek
  - average: 27.35 cu ft/s (0.774 m^{3}/s) at mouth with Crabtree Creek

Basin features
- Progression: Crabtree Creek → Neuse River → Pamlico Sound → Atlantic Ocean
- River system: Neuse River
- Tributaries
  - left: Brier Creek
  - right: unnamed tributaries
- Waterbodies: Lake Crabtree

Stirrup Iron Creek is a tributary to Crabtree Creek that rises near Brassfield, North Carolina and then flows south-southeast into Lake Crabtree. The watershed is about 31% forested.

== Wastewater ==
On June 16, 2026, a collapsed pipe resulted in discharge of approximately 95,000 gallons of untreated wastewater into Stirrup Iron Creek.

On June 15, 2025, there was a discharge of 20,447 gallons of untreated wastewater into the creek due to grease and flushable wipes in the line.

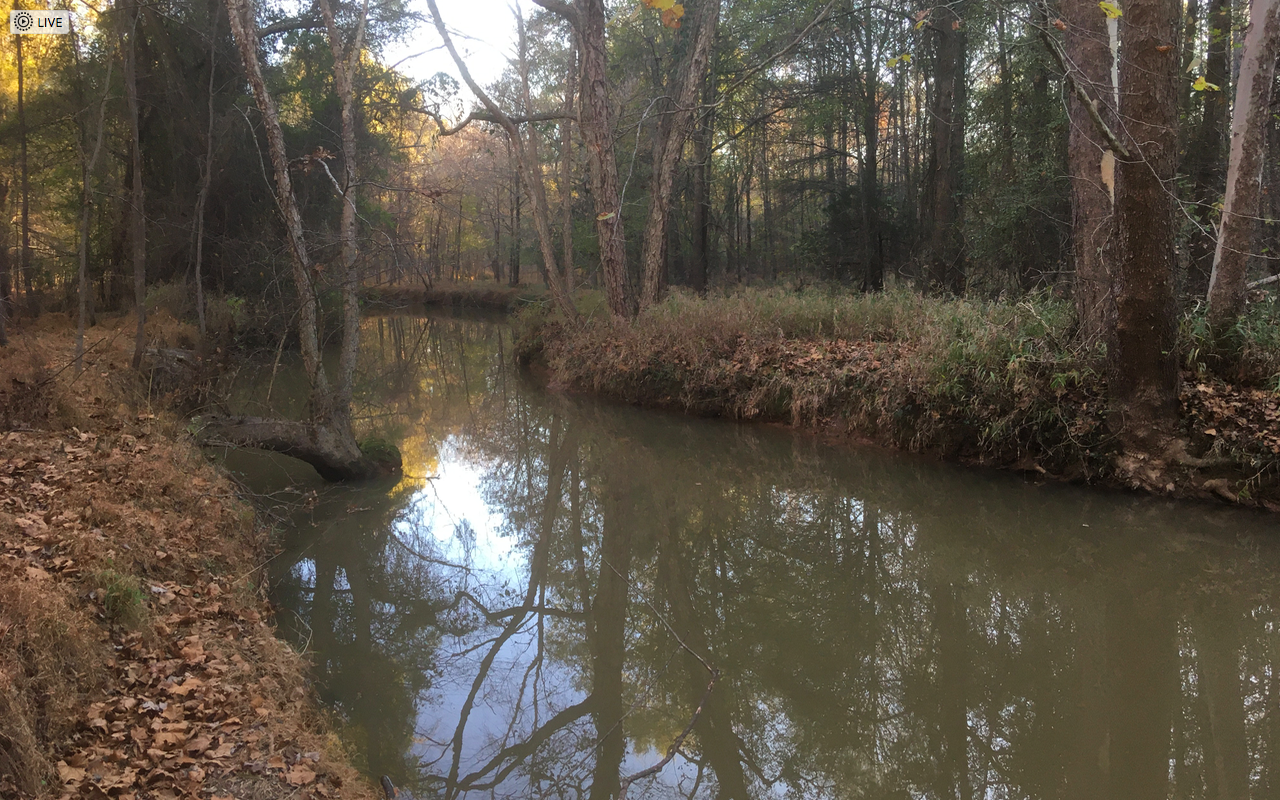
Stirrup Iron Creek

== See also ==
- List of rivers of North Carolina
