= Beaverdam Creek (Crabtree Creek tributary) =

Stream in North Carolina, USA

Beaverdam Creek Tributary to Crabtree Creek
- Location of Beaverdam Creek mouth Beaverdam Creek (Crabtree Creek tributary) (the United States)

Location
- Country: United States
- State: North Carolina
- County: Wake
- City: Raleigh

Physical characteristics
- Source: confluence of Southwest Prong and Southeast Prong of Beaverdam Creek
  - location: Raleigh, North Carolina
  - coordinates: 35°48′58″N 078°39′41″W
  - elevation: 252 ft (77 m)
- Mouth: Crabtree Creek
  - location: Raleigh, North Carolina
  - coordinates: 35°49′28″N 078°38′52″W
  - elevation: 200 ft (61 m)
- Length: 1.04 mi (1.67 km)
- Basin size: 3.66 square miles (9.5 km^{2})
- Discharge
  - location: Crabtree Creek
  - average: 4.36 cu ft/s (0.123 m^{3}/s) at mouth with Crabtree Creek

Basin features
- Progression: Crabtree Creek → Neuse River → Pamlico Sound → Atlantic Ocean
- River system: Neuse River
- Tributaries
  - left: Southwest Prong
  - right: Southeast Prong
- Bridges: Glenwood Avenue (US 70), Scotland Street

Beaverdam Creek is a 1.04 mi (1.67 km) long tributary to Crabtree Creek in Wake County, North Carolina and is classed as a 2nd order stream on the EPA waters geoviewer site.

== Course ==
Beaverdam Creek is formed at the confluence of the Southeast and Southwest Prongs in northwestern Raleigh, North Carolina. It then flows northeast through the Carolina Country Club to meet Crabtree Creek. About 5% of the watershed is considered to be forested.

== Watershed ==
Beaverdam Creek drains 3.66 square miles (9.5 km^{2}) of area. The confluence is at the border of felsic gneiss, but the stream then flows over Falls Leucogneiss. The watershed receives an average of 46.6 in/year of precipitation and has a wetness index of 390.31.

== See also ==
- List of rivers of North Carolina
