= Millbrook, North Carolina =

Former village in North Carolina, US

Coordinates: 35.8509839°N 78.6052805°W

Millbrook was a village in Wake County, North Carolina. Growth of Raleigh suburbs in the mid to late twentieth century swallowed up the village. Millbrook High, Middle, and Elementary school in Raleigh are named after the village.

== History ==
The community developed in the early 1860s around an important gristmill situated on Marsh Creek. The gristmill, known as "Mill Brook," is believed to be the origin of the village's name. Historians believe that the remains of this original mill still exist today, though they are largely unrecognized by many locals.

The village grew around the Raleigh and Gaston Railroad, which established a station in the village in 1860. This railroad line, chartered in 1835 and completed in 1840, was North Carolina's second railroad, connecting Raleigh to Gaston, North Carolina. The establishment of the railroad station facilitated the growth of Millbrook by providing transportation and access to markets.

In the mid-20th century, the expansion of Raleigh's suburbs led to the annexation of Millbrook, and the village gradually faded from history. Today, very few remnants of the Millbrook community remain. Some abandoned homesteads can be found near Falls Lake, serving as ruins from another era.

== Geography ==
Located approximately six miles north of present downtown Raleigh, at the intersection of what is now East Millbrook Road and Old Wake Forest Road (now Falls of Neuse Road). The area was characterized by rolling hills and fertile farmland, with an approximate elevation of 328 feet (100 meters) above sea level.

The village developed along Marsh Creek, a 6.21-mile-long tributary of Crabtree Creek. The creek's watershed encompasses approximately 9.58 square miles, primarily characterized by developed land with limited forest cover. Marsh Creek flows southeast through eastern Raleigh, eventually merging with Crabtree Creek near the US 64 and I-440 interchange.
