= Turkey Creek (Crabtree Creek tributary) =

Stream in North Carolina, USA

Turkey Creek Tributary to Crabtree Creek
- Location of Turkey Creek mouth Turkey Creek (Crabtree Creek tributary) (the United States)

Location
- Country: United States
- State: North Carolina
- County: Wake
- City: Cary

Physical characteristics
- Source: divide between Turkey Creek and White Oak Creek
  - location: Cary, North Carolina
  - coordinates: 35°46′39″N 078°50′02″W
  - elevation: 400 ft (120 m)
- Mouth: Crabtree Creek
  - location: Cary, North Carolina
  - coordinates: 35°48′07″N 078°50′02″W
  - elevation: 305 ft (93 m)
- Length: 2.17 mi (3.49 km)
- Basin size: 1.80 square miles (4.7 km^{2})
- Discharge
  - location: Crabtree Creek
  - average: 2.21 cu ft/s (0.063 m^{3}/s) at mouth with Crabtree Creek

Basin features
- Progression: Crabtree Creek → Neuse River → Pamlico Sound → Atlantic Ocean
- River system: Neuse River
- Tributaries
  - left: unnamed tributaries
  - right: unnamed tributaries

Turkey Creek rises in southwest Cary, North Carolina and then flows northeast to join Crabtree Creek. The watershed is about 5% forested.

On May 12, 2026, a significant amount of untreated wastewater was introduced into Turkey Creek by a contractor working on an airport expansion project. The City of Raleigh immediately began cleanup, which was completed May 21 and also issued notices of violation to the contractors involved in the discharge of wastewater and its introduction into the stormwater system.

The Turkey Creek Scenic Byway was added to the list of North Carolina Scenic Byways in 2019. The designation was given to 11 miles of roadway.

== See also ==
- List of rivers of North Carolina
