= Coles Branch (Crabtree Creek tributary) =

Stream in North Carolina, US

Coles Branch Tributary to Crabtree Creek
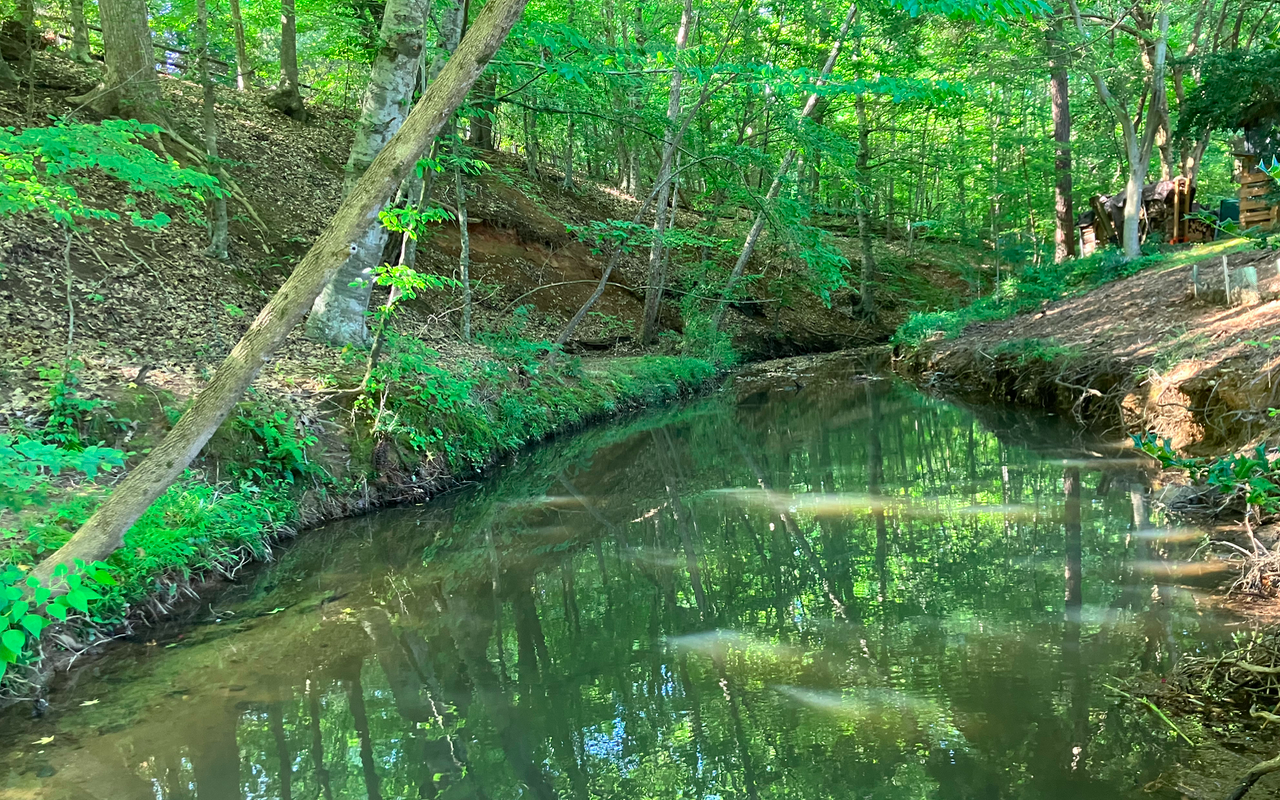
- Coles Branch in Cary

- Location of Coles Branch mouth Coles Branch (Crabtree Creek tributary) (the United States)

Location
- Country: United States
- State: North Carolina
- County: Wake
- City: Cary

Physical characteristics
- Source: divide between Coles Branch and Swift Creek
  - location: Cary, North Carolina
  - coordinates: 35°46′59″N 078°48′19″W
  - elevation: 416 ft (127 m)
- Mouth: Crabtree Creek
  - location: Cary, North Carolina
  - coordinates: 35°48′10″N 078°50′02″W
  - elevation: 305 ft (93 m)
- Length: 2.7 mi (4.3 km)
- Basin size: 2.60 square miles (6.7 km^{2})
- Discharge
  - location: Crabtree Creek
  - average: 2.60 cu ft/s (0.074 m^{3}/s) at mouth with Crabtree Creek

Basin features
- Progression: Crabtree Creek → Neuse River → Pamlico Sound → Atlantic Ocean
- River system: Neuse River
- Tributaries
  - left: unnamed tributaries
  - right: unnamed tributaries

Coles Branch is a 2.7 mi (4.3 km) long tributary to Crabtree Creek in Wake County, North Carolina, and is classed as a 2nd order stream on the EPA waters GeoViewer site.

== Course ==
Coles Branch rises in a pond in western Cary, North Carolina, and then flows northwest to Crabtree Creek. It is a developed watershed with seven percent of the watershed considered to be forested.

== Watershed ==
Coles Branch drains 2.60 square miles (6.7 km^{2}) of area in the western part of Cary. Coles Branch is underlaid by the Deep River Basin. The watershed receives an average of 46.4 inches (118 cm) per year of precipitation and has a wetness index of 413.95.
