= Umstead Park United Church of Christ =

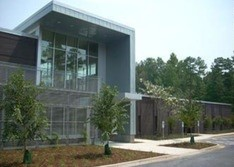
- Umstead Park UCC

Religion
- Affiliation: United Church of Christ, Open and Affirming, North Carolina Council of Churches
- Leadership: Mary Elizabeth Hanchey, interim pastor
- Status: Active

Location
- Location: Raleigh, North Carolina, United States
- Interactive map of Umstead Park United Church of Christ
- Coordinates: 35°53′12″N 78°44′54″W

Architecture
- Architect: BBH Design
- Completed: 2007

Website
- www.upucc.org

Umstead Park United Church of Christ (UPUCC) is a progressive United Church of Christ congregation located next to the William B. Umstead State Park in Raleigh, North Carolina.

== History ==
On March 28, 1999, North Raleigh United Church met for its first service of worship at Durant Road Middle School in Raleigh. Invitations to a new, progressive community of faith were mailed to area households, and 120 people attended the first gathering. Over the next few months, some of those people wrote a covenant, which would serve as the central document for the church. On October 3, 1999, 70 prospective members signed the Covenant and become Covenant Partners. The church later met at the Kerr Family YMCA for a time, then purchased their current building and on August 26, 2007, held the first worship service at 8208 Brownleigh Drive, changing the name of the church to Umstead Park UCC.

Umstead Park UCC was the first UCC church in the Eastern NC Association of the UCC Southern Conference to be established as an Open and Affirming (ONA) congregation. Other existing UCC congregations had adopted ONA covenants prior to this, but because a new congregation must be accepted by the local association, there was reluctance on the part of some member churches to accept the new church. Eventually, this issue was resolved and UPUCC became a member of the Eastern NC Association of the UCC. However, in the process, some conservative UCC churches left the conference in protest.

In 2006 the church joined in partnership with BBH Design (now Ewing Cole) to buy and retrofit an existing building adjacent to Umstead Park; and in 2009 the Brownleigh Drive building was the first church in the southeast to be LEED Gold Certified. In 2020 a PV solar array was added to generate electricity.

The Justice Theater Project has an office in the building and uses space in the church for Summer Camp, storage, rehearsals and performances.

In October 2017 the church voted to provide sanctuary for an undocumented immigrant, whose children are US citizens, while he awaits a ruling on his stay of removal from the country. He first came to the United States from Mexico to escape an abusive father when he was 17. A U.S. Immigration and Customs Enforcement (ICE) policy largely prohibits enforcement actions at sensitive locations such as churches or schools.

In November 2019 the church provided the space for a forum organized by the national Latino advocacy organization Mijente where then presidential candidate Elizabeth Warren spoke and was questioned about ICE and deportation.

In March 2021 US immigration policies eased sufficiently so that sanctuary was no longer necessary for the undocumented 42-year-old immigrant who had been living at the church for over three years. A total of 71 undocumented immigrants fled to churches in the wake of former President Donald Trump's harsh immigration crackdown. About 22 remain, according to Church World Service, which has tracked the publicly known cases. They have formed what is sometimes called the "New Sanctuary movement."

In February 2025, more than two dozen religious groups, including the North Carolina Council of Churches, filed a lawsuit against the Department of Homeland Security challenging the Trump administration's reversal of a policy that barred Immigration and Customs Enforcement from conducting raids at houses of worship. Umstead Park UCC is a member of the NC Council of Churches.

== See also ==
- Sanctuary Movement
- Progressive Christianity
