= Lake Crabtree County Park =

Park in Wake County, North Carolina

- Boat ramp at Lake Crabtree County Park
- Interactive map of Lake Crabtree County Park
- Type: County Park
- Location: Wake County, North Carolina, U.S.
- Nearest town: Morrisville, North Carolina

Lake Crabtree County Park is a park in Wake County, North Carolina. It is a forested area between Cary, Morrisville, and Raleigh-Durham International Airport (RDU), bounded by the northeastern shore of Lake Crabtree, I-40, and Aviation Parkway. The main entrance is on the Aviation Parkway side and is equipped with two playgrounds (for different age groups), a boat dock (as well as rentable sailboats), bathrooms, an observation tower, and other amenities. A system of hiking and biking trails crosses through the park, with the most used one (especially by hikers) along the lakeshore. This trail connects the park entrance to the Black Creek Greenway-Old Reedy Creek Road intersection, near the entrance to William B. Umstead State Park.

Lake Crabtree County Park is Wake County's oldest and most-visited county park, with an estimated 330,000 visitors in 2024.

== History ==
Early measures to control flooding and erosion on the land that became the park date back to the 1950s, as documented in the Crabtree Creek Watershed Work Plan.

In 1967, RDU took control of the land that came to Lake Crabtree County Park, as well as the adjacent tract that came to be known as 286. This acquisition may have initially relied on federal funds from an FAA grant for Project 9-31-011-C709 which were later repurposed.

RDU began leasing the land to Wake County for $1 per year. The lease started in 1985 (or 1988), first including 33 acres on the lake with boating and other facilities and adding an additional 148 acres used for mountain biking trails in 1991.

== Athletics ==
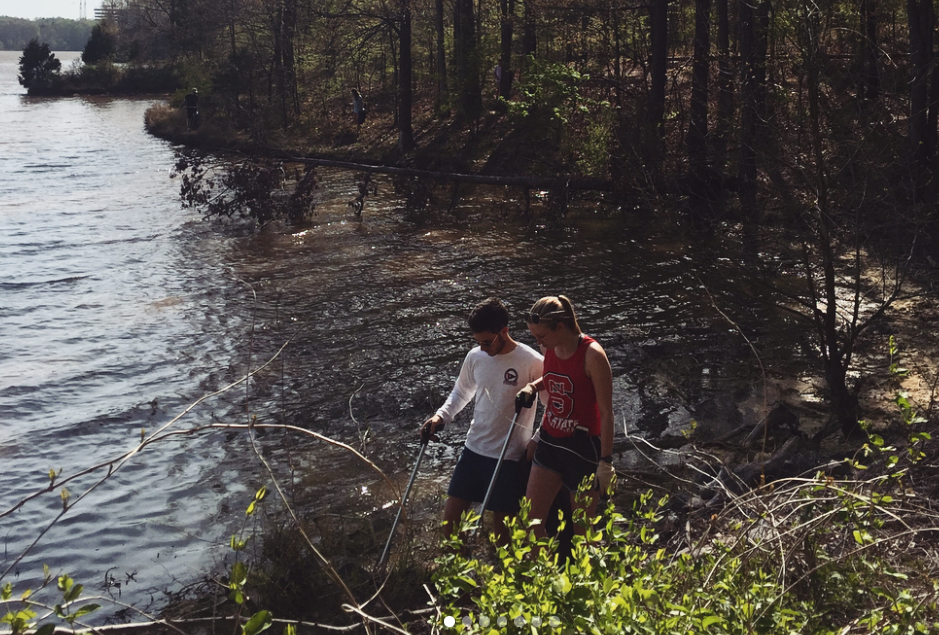
Students from NC State University participate in a shoreline cleanup at Lake Crabtree County Park

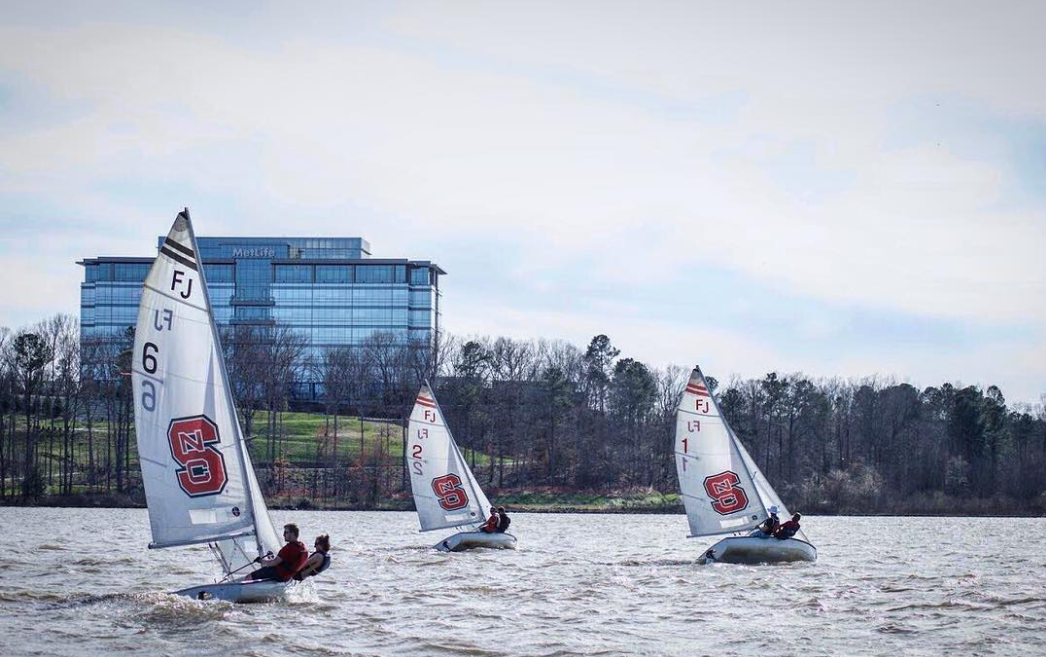
Sailboats on Lake Crabtree

Since 2012, Lake Crabtree County Park has been a host venue for the Valor Games Southeast, a three-day adapted-sports competition for veterans and members of the Armed Forces with disabilities. The park features a wheelchair accessible dock providing access to the water for people with disabilities.

In 2013, the dirt event of the annual Trans Jam BMX bike riding competition was held at the park.

Since 2016, Lake Crabtree is home to the NC State University Sailing Team, and the host venue for the SailPack Women's Intercollegiate Regatta, as well as the Triangle Tango Regatta, a co-ed fleet racing event, both held in the fall. In February 2025, the team hosted the first Thomas H. Stafford Trophy Regatta on the lake. The club also hosts lake cleanup events at the park. Community Sailing is a featured activity during the summer at the Lake. The RTP High School sailing program is also located at Lake Crabtree.

== Development ==
Since the 1988 agreement, changes to Federal Aviation Administration (FAA) regulations such as the introduction of 49 U.S.C. § 47133 and 49 U.S.C. § 47107(b) required RDU to get fair market value for land it leases and to seek financial self-sufficiency. RDU officials argued that the community use exemption did not apply to the 2025 renewal of the park's lease because RDU originally purchased the land with local rather than federal funds.

In January, 2025, following the lapse of the 1985 lease, RDU International Airport announced that they were looking for opportunities to redevelop 136 acres of the park. Initial plans included attempts to develop the park into a revenue-generating entertainment district. The redevelopment plans were met with strong community resistance. During a public discussion on 29 January held by the airport's governing board, inviting ideas on how to redevelop the land residents voiced support for keeping the park as it was. Residents questioned whether the income brought in through the redevelopment efforts would compensate for the goodwill towards the airport authority and utility of the park that would be lost in the redevelopment. Residents also suggested leasing the land to restaurants and other business to serve hikers and bikers who frequently used the trails of the park or creating spaces for art shows, weddings or concerts. On May 31, 2025, hundreds of cyclists gathered at the park for the Rally to Save Lake Crabtree. The next day, the park closed its cycling trails in preparation for expiration of the lease on June 30.

Following the consultation with the public, on June 16, Wake County Commissioners approved a new lease for approximately 70 acres of the park near the lake, including picnic, playground, volleyball, and boating facilities. The lease runs for 20 years with options for two 10-year renewals. Rent for the first year is $214,488 and will increase 3% increase per year, with additional adjustments possible every five years. On July 17, the RDU Airport Authority board approved a non-binding agreement with Dallas-based real-estate firm Pacific Elm Properties, the only company to respond to their request for proposals to redevelop the rest of the park not leased to the Wake County. The proposal is for a "recreation and wellness destination" which may include restaurants, outdoor-related retail, a boutique hotel and facilities for climbing, skating, zip-lining and mountain biking.

== Gallery ==
Boat launch and radio sailboat tent

Paddleboat rentals

Path along the lake

Viewing tower

Gazebo with access ramp

Amphitheater

Playground

Volleyball field

Recycling bins
