= Lake Crabtree =

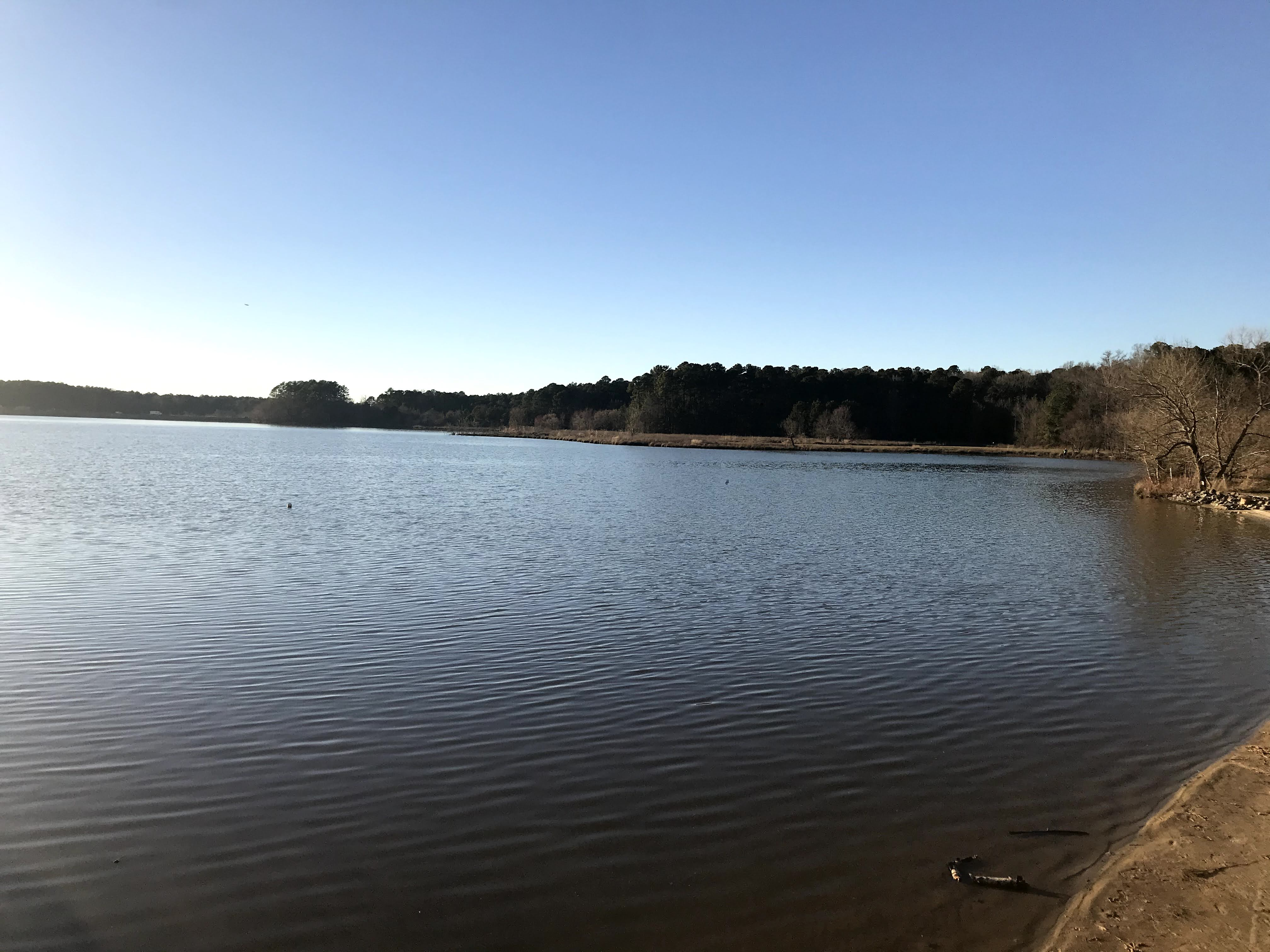

- Location within North Carolina Location within the United States
- Location: Cary, North Carolina, United States
- Coordinates: 35°50′13″N 78°47′59″W
- Type: Reservoir
- Primary inflows: Crabtree Creek, Haleys Branch, Stirrup Iron Creek
- Primary outflows: Crabtree Creek
- Basin countries: United States
- Surface area: 520 acres (210 ha)
- Average depth: 6.5 ft (2.0 m)
- Max. depth: 13 ft (4.0 m)
- Shore length^{1}: ~5 mi (8.0 km)
- Surface elevation: 282 ft (86 m)
- ^{1} Shore length is not a well-defined measure.

Lake Crabtree is a 520-acre (2.1 km^{2}) reservoir in Cary, North Carolina. In order to alleviate the possibility of flooding, it was constructed in 1989 by the Natural Resources Conservation Service via damming the Crabtree Creek. It is currently within the Lake Crabtree County Park and provides sailing and recreation opportunities to nearby residents.

== Gallery ==
Crabtree Creek entering Lake Crabtree.

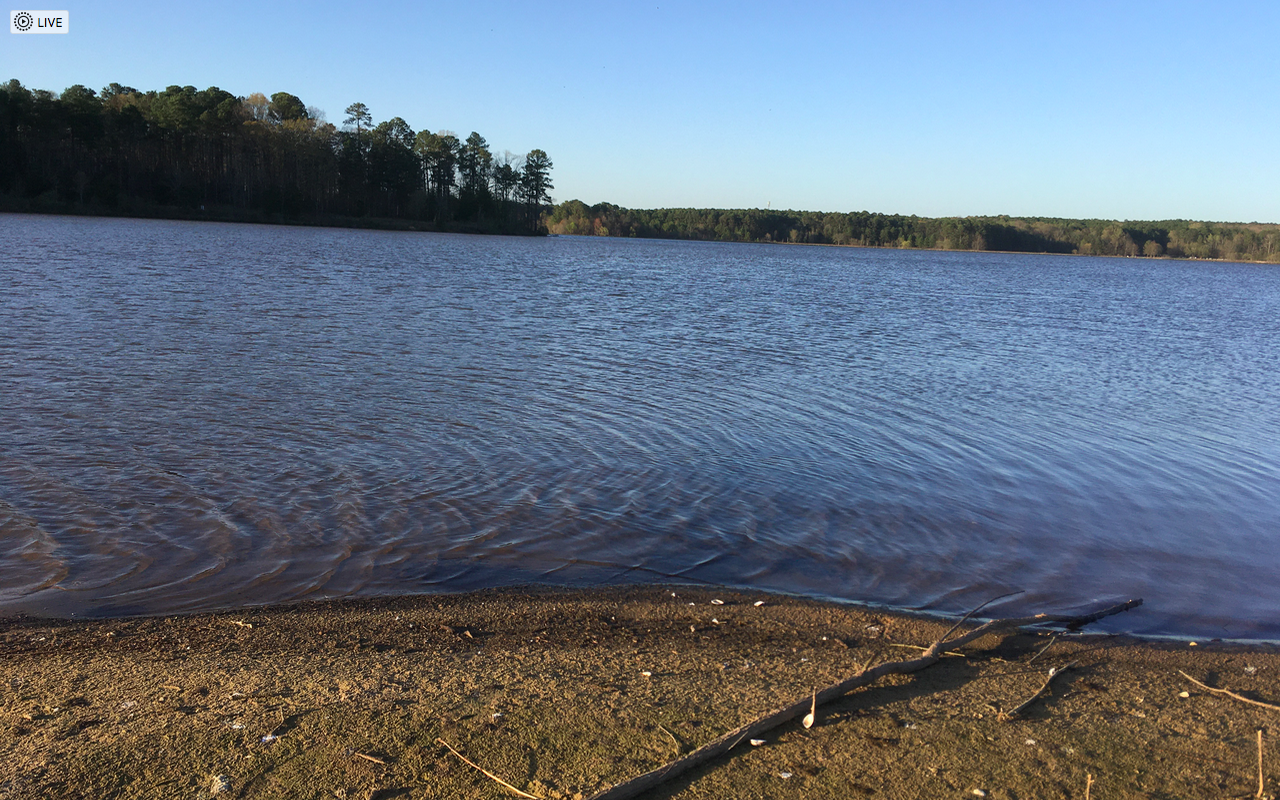
View from an island in Lake Crabtree

Lake Crabtree at sunset
