= Marsh Creek (Crabtree Creek tributary) =

Stream in North Carolina, USA

Marsh Creek Tributary to Crabtree Creek
- Location of Marsh Creek mouth Marsh Creek (Crabtree Creek tributary) (the United States)

Location
- Country: United States
- State: North Carolina
- County: Wake
- City: Raleigh

Physical characteristics
- Source: divide between Marsh Creek and Perry Creek
  - location: Raleigh, North Carolina in Northridge Country Club
  - coordinates: 35°52′19″N 078°37′03″W
  - elevation: 408 ft (124 m)
- Mouth: Crabtree Creek
  - location: east side of Raleigh, North Carolina
  - coordinates: 35°47′43″N 078°35′43″W
  - elevation: 174 ft (53 m)
- Length: 6.21 mi (9.99 km)
- Basin size: 9.58 square miles (24.8 km^{2})
- Discharge
  - location: Crabtree Creek
  - average: 13.24 cu ft/s (0.375 m^{3}/s) at mouth with Crabtree Creek

Basin features
- Progression: Crabtree Creek → Neuse River → Pamlico Sound → Atlantic Ocean
- River system: Neuse River
- Tributaries
  - left: unnamed tributaries
  - right: unnamed tributaries
- Bridges: Spring Forest Road, Volant Drive, Falls Church Road, Quail Ridge Road, Hodge Creek Drive, Old Wake Forest Road, Atlantic Avenue, East Millbrook Road, New Hope Church Road, Ingram Drive, US 1, Stoney Brook Drive, North Raleigh Boulevard, Timberlake Drive, I-440, Yonkers Road

Marsh Creek is a 6.21 mi (9.99 km) long tributary to Crabtree Creek in Wake County, North Carolina and is classed as a 2nd order stream on the EPA waters geoviewer site.

== Course ==
Marsh Creek rises in northeastern Raleigh then flows southeast through the eastern parts Raleigh, NC to meet Crabtree Creek near the US 64 and I-440 interchange. About 6% of the watershed is forested and most of the watershed is developed.

== Watershed ==
Marsh Creek drains 9.58 square miles (24.8 km^{2}) of area that is underlaid by Raleigh Gneiss geology. The watershed receives an average of 46.6 in/year of precipitation and has a wetness index of 451.60.

== Flooding ==
Firefighters rescued three children from floodwaters during Tropical Storm Debby, when rain caused the creek to expand from its usual width of about five feet to 10-15 feet.

== Wastewater ==
In 2018, approximately 5 million gallons of sewage spilled into the creek at Yonkers Road. A construction area flooded and an equipment trailer was pushed into a bypass pipe that was in use during repairs.

== Research ==
In 2025, researchers from North Carolina State University released plastic bottles with GPS monitors and QR codes into the creek to study how litter from Raleigh travels to the Atlantic Ocean.

== See also ==
- List of rivers of North Carolina
