= Pigeon House Branch =

Stream in North Carolina, USA

Pigeon House Branch Tributary to Crabtree Creek
- Location of Pigeon House Branch mouth Pigeon House Branch (the United States)

Location
- Country: United States
- State: North Carolina
- County: Wake
- City: Raleigh

Physical characteristics
- Source: divide between Pigeon House Branch and Rocky Branch
  - location: Raleigh, North Carolina
  - coordinates: 35°47′20″N 078°38′40″W
  - elevation: 280 ft (85 m)
- Mouth: Crabtree Creek
  - location: Raleigh, North Carolina
  - coordinates: 35°48′16″N 078°36′32″W
  - elevation: 190 ft (58 m)
- Length: 2.88 mi (4.63 km)
- Basin size: 4.69 square miles (12.1 km^{2})
- Discharge
  - location: Crabtree Creek
  - average: 5.29 cu ft/s (0.150 m^{3}/s) at mouth with Crabtree Creek

Basin features
- Progression: Crabtree Creek → Neuse River → Pamlico Sound → Atlantic Ocean
- River system: Neuse River
- Tributaries
  - right: Cemetery Branch
- Bridges: Wade Avenue, US 1/401, Old Louisburg Road, Crabtree Boulevard

Pigeon House Branch is a 2.88 mi (4.63 km) long tributary to Crabtree Creek in Wake County, North Carolina and is classed as a 2nd order stream on the EPA waters geoviewer site.

== Course ==
Pigeon House Branch rises in downtown Raleigh, North Carolina then flows northeast to meet Crabtree Creek just upstream of Bridges Branch. It is one of the more developed tributaries with less than 1% of the watershed considered to be forested.

== Watershed ==
Pigeon House Branch drains 4.69 square miles (12.1 km^{2}) of area that is underlaid by Raleigh Gneiss geology. The watershed receives an average of 46.7 in/year of precipitation and has a wetness index of 433.76.

== Development ==
In August 2024, Interior Secretary Deb Haaland visited the future Smoky Hollow Park location on the site of the former Devereux Meadow. Through the Outdoor Recreation Legacy Partnership Grants Program, the U.S. Department of the Interior funded restoration of the portion of Pigeon House Branch that runs through the park.

Artist Vicki Scuri cited Pigeon House Branch (along with Raleigh's oak trees) as inspiration for the metal panels that form part of the public artworks added in 2021 to two recently replaced bridges in downtown Raleigh.

== Flooding ==
In August 2025, after heavy rainfall, Pigeon House Branch overflowed its banks, flooding a nearby car dealership on Capital Boulevard in Raleigh.

== See also ==
- List of rivers of North Carolina
