= Upchurch, North Carolina =

Upchurch is a community within the Town of Cary in Wake County, North Carolina, United States.

== Geography ==
Upchurch is located at 35°47′22″N 78°51′27″W (35.7893170 -78.857507), south of the community of Carpenter.

== History ==
Upchurch is a former unincorporated community that was recently annexed into the Town of Cary.
