= Leesville, North Carolina =

- unincorporated community
- Location within North Carolina
- Coordinates: 35°54′26″N 78°33′34″W
- Country: United States
- State: North Carolina
- County: Wake
- Time zone: UTC-5 (Eastern (EST))
  - Summer (DST): UTC-4 (EDT)
- ZIP code: 27613
- Area code: 919
- GNIS feature ID: 0988319
- Website: http://rolesvillenc.gov/

Leesville is an unincorporated community located in Wake County, North Carolina, United States.
