= Crossroads Plaza (North Carolina) =

Shopping center in North Carolina, United States

Coordinates: 35.760983°N 78.738102°W

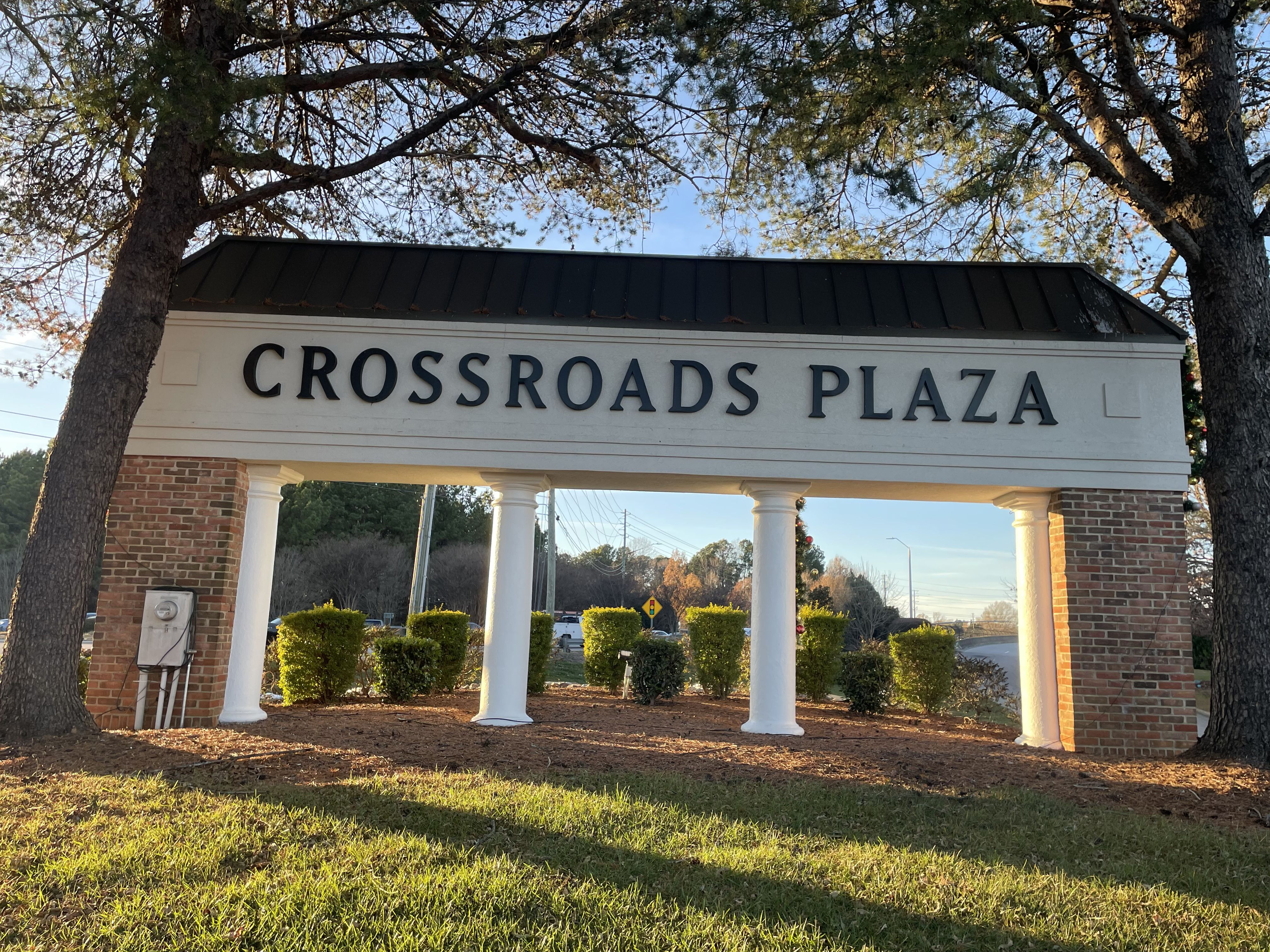

Crossroads Plaza is an outdoor shopping center located in Cary, North Carolina, United States. The shopping center was opened in 1992 and has been added onto and renovated several times since then. It contains over 60 stores, including national chains and locally owned stores.

== History ==
The Crossroads site comprises 237 acres (96 ha) and was originally developed by NCNB (now Bank of America), acting as trustee for the Public Employees Retirement System of Ohio, as a commercial development with an enclosed shopping mall plus 250,000-square-foot (23,000 m^{2}) of non-retail space including a corporate park and hotel. NCNB enlisted LJ Hooker Corporation, who was embarking on an ill-fated plan to build malls across the United States, to develop the mall on 87.7 acres (35.5 ha) at the northern end of the site.

Hooker filed plans in 1988 for a $240 million regional mall with 1,350,000-square-foot (125,000 m^{2}) of retail space on two levels, five department stores ranging from 80,000-square-foot (7,400 m^{2}) to 200,000-square-foot (19,000 m^{2}), a 65-foot (20 m) tall glass-roofed center court enclosing 1.5-acre (6,100 m^{2}), and 6,853 parking spaces. The planned development would have increased Cary's tax base by 18%. Site clearance and road work began, but construction was halted when a national recession forced the company to declare bankruptcy in late 1989.

The Crossroads Mall site was soon purchased by New Market Development. In 1990, they filed drastically changed plans. Instead of an enclosed mall at the center of the site, they proposed a 628,610-square-foot (58,400 m^{2}) power center with 11 big-box anchors and a few smaller shops lining the edge of the site and 3,458 parking spaces at the center. Although the new proposal had half as much retail space, it was very large for an outdoor retail center at the time.

The plaza opened in 1991 with anchors including Toys "R" Us, Uptons department store, Stein Mart, Bookstar, Pet Depot, Marshalls, REI, OfficeMax, Home Quarters Warehouse, and Phar-Mor. Service Merchandise opened after the grand opening.

Several of the original anchors have changed. Bookstar shut after acquisition by Barnes & Noble, and others have gone bankrupt: Home Quarters was replaced with Dick's Sporting Goods and Bed Bath & Beyond (which closed in 2023 when the company went bankrupt. It has since been replaced by Bob’s Discount Furniture), Phar-Mor was replaced by Best Buy, Service Merchandise was replaced by DSW, Inc. and A.C. Moore (which has since been subdivided into Aerie and American Eagle Outfitters) and Uptons was replaced with Michaels and Old Navy. Pet Depot became Petco, REI was replaced by HomeGoods, OfficeMax was replaced by Ross, Rugged Warehouse was replaced by Home Centric, and Toys "R" Us closed in 2018 after their "Going out of Business" sale. Its space was filled by Hobby Lobby in February 2020.

The center was purchased by Kimco Realty in 2014, which also owns the adjacent Centrum at Crossroads shopping center.

== Surrounding shopping area ==
Since Crossroads was built, several adjacent or nearby shopping centers have been established. These surrounding centers have grocery stores or discount stores as anchors, though they also include competitors of anchors of Crossroads itself. Cary Towne Center, built in 1979 and closed in 2021, was located approximately 1-mile (1.6 km) from Crossroads Plaza down Walnut Street.
