= William B. Umstead State Park =

State park in North Carolina, United States

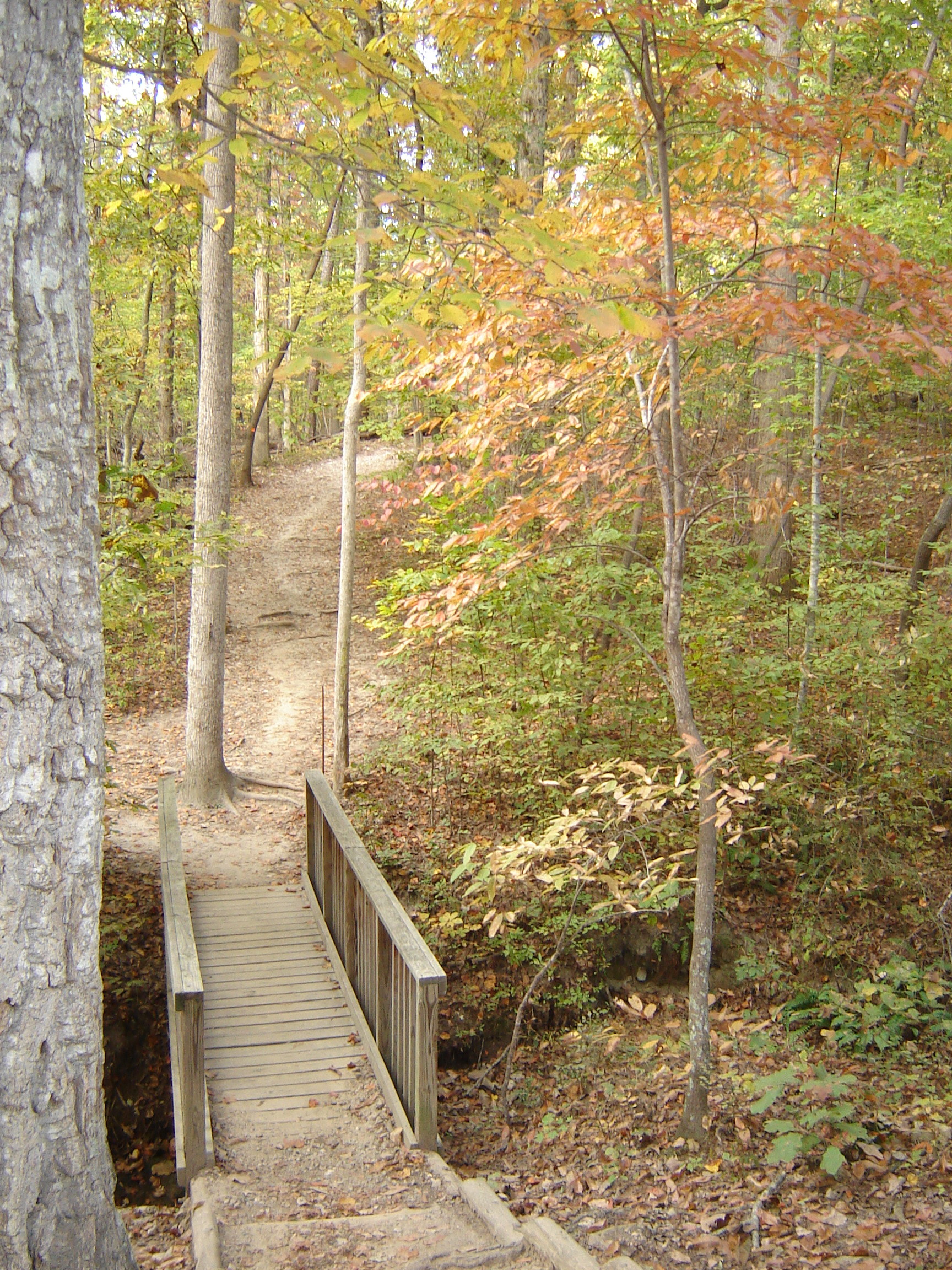

- Location within North Carolina Location within the United States
- Interactive map of William B. Umstead State Park
- Location: Wake County, North Carolina, United States
- Coordinates: 35°53′26″N 78°45′01″W
- Area: 5,599 acres (2,266 ha)
- Established: 1937 (demonstration area); 1943 (state park)
- Administrator: North Carolina Division of Parks and Recreation
- Named for: William Bradley Umstead
- Website: Official website
- Crabtree Creek Recreational Demonstration Area
- U.S. National Register of Historic Places
- U.S. Historic district
- Architect: J.R. Marks, CCC
- MPS: Wake County MPS
- NRHP reference No.: 95000783
- Added to NRHP: June 30, 1995

William B. Umstead State Park is a North Carolina state park in Wake County, North Carolina, in the United States. It covers 5,442 acres (8.503 mi^{2}; 22.02 km^{2}) nestled between the expanding cities of Raleigh, Cary, and Durham, North Carolina. It offers a combined 34.3 miles (55.2 km) hiking, bike and bridle trails, camping, picnic areas, and educational programs.

Part of the East Coast Greenway, a 3,000 mile long system of trails connecting Maine to Florida, runs through the park.

== History ==
Long before the first settlers, the area now known as William B. Umstead State Park was an untamed land. American bison, elk, bobcats and wolves roamed forests of oak, hickory and beech. Native Americans later inhabited the land and avenues of trade were developed nearby. Such avenues included the Occoneeche trail to the north and the Pee Dee trail to the south. In 1774, land grants opened the area for settlement.

Forests were cleared as agricultural interests sprouted. While early farming efforts were successful, poor cultivation practices and one-crop production led to depletion and erosion of the soil. During the Depression, farmers made futile attempts to grow cotton in worn-out soil around Crabtree Creek.

In 1934, under the Resettlement Administration, federal and state agencies united to buy 5,000 acres (20 km^{2}) of this submarginal land to develop a recreation area. The Civilian Conservation Corps, as well as the Works Progress Administration, helped construct the site while providing much needed jobs. The park was constructed between 1936 and 1947.

Four camps along with day-use and picnic facilities were built and the park opened to the public in 1937.

The state purchased this area, known as Crabtree Creek Recreational Demonstration Area, for $1, and more facilities were built as the General Assembly made its first state parks division appropriation in the 1940s. In 1950, more than 1,000 acres (4.0 km^{2}) of the park were established as a separate park for African-Americans. This area was named Reedy Creek State Park. Crabtree Creek Recreational Demonstration Area was renamed a few years later after former Governor William Bradley Umstead because of his conservation efforts. In 1966, the Crabtree Creek and Reedy Creek areas were united under the same name; William B. Umstead State Park was open to everyone.

Prior to the purchase of the land for public use, it had historically been used for timberland, as well as a site for several mills along Crabtree Creek. Remnants of milling operations can still be found preserved within the park.

During segregation, the Highway 70 entrance was for whites and the Reedy Creek entrance for blacks. Currently, the Reedy Creek entrance is the main entrance to the park for North Carolina State University. Forestry courses use this entrance to examine the trees native to the park. Additionally, many Raleigh runners use this more private entrance to run in an area of the park that is less frequented by tourist and hiking groups. A clear consequence of this segregation of entrances is the lack of a public road that connects both entrances - vehicles that access the park by one entrance cannot go through the park to the other side.

== Information ==
Umstead is bordered by Raleigh-Durham International Airport on the west, Interstate 40 on the south, US 70 on the north, and by the western outskirts of Raleigh on the east. The main bridle and bike trail is Reedy Creek Road, which is open to traffic in western Raleigh (connecting the North Carolina Museum of Art to the park entrance), closed except to rangers' vehicles as it crosses the park from east to west (a distance of 3.5 miles), and then heads south into Cary where it becomes open to traffic again. At the edge of the park it connects to Black Creek Greenway and the Lake Crabtree County Park trails. Crabtree Creek also flows across Umstead; its source is Lake Crabtree right at the park's edge, and it flows eastward throughout much of the southern part of the park (with trails in varying degrees of maintenance along its length) and then crosses Reedy Creek Road to flow north. The main entrances are the two ends of Reedy Creek Road, two entrances off of Ebenezer Church Road in Raleigh near where Crabtree Creek leaves the park, the official Reedy Creek entrance at the end of Cary's Harrison Avenue, and the park's main entrance at Highway 70 in the north. The latter are equipped with parking lots, bathrooms, and campgrounds; at the Highway 70 entrance there is also a visitors' center and a campground. Other important bike and bridle trails include Graylyn Road, connecting the Ebenezer Church entrance to Reedy Creek Road, and Turkey Creek Road, which winds through the northern part of the park; hiking trails include the Company Mill trail in the south and the Sycamore Trail in the north, both of which are loops of moderate difficulty, as well as many others. Bikes and horses are prohibited on hiking trails.

Umstead is part of the Southeastern mixed forests ecoregion. The topography is hilly, and it has several artificial lakes (which are very common in Wake County, partially due to a flood control plan implemented over the last half-century).

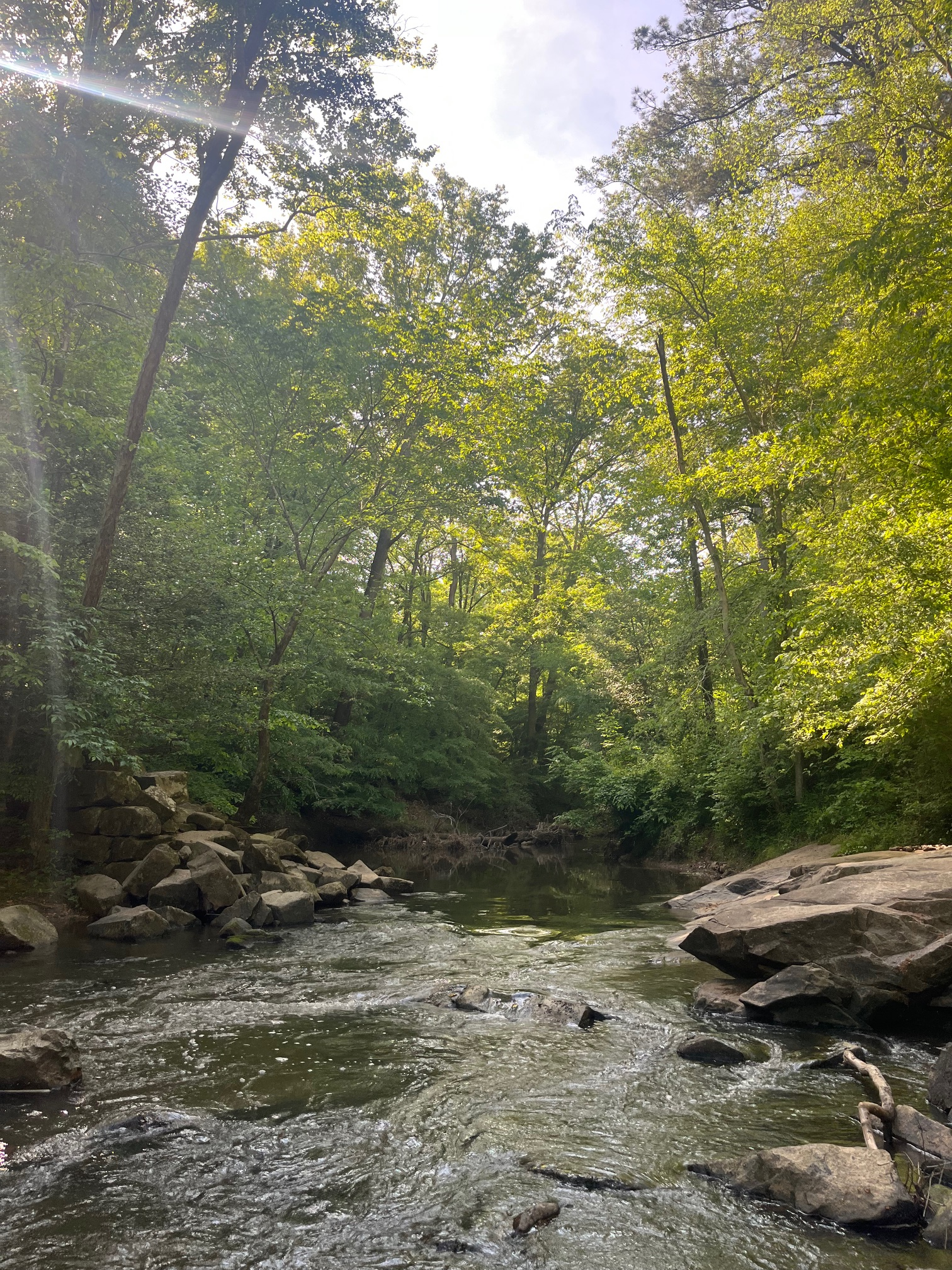
Rock outcrop on Crabtree Creek off of Company Mill trail.

== Piedmont Beech Natural Area ==
Is a 61-acre (0.25 km^{2}) National Natural Landmark located inside the park, which protects a mixed mesophytic forest and maturing stands of beech trees. The natural area was designated in 1974. Access to the area is allowed only by special permit.

== See also ==
- List of National Natural Landmarks in North Carolina
- List of Registered Historic Places in North Carolina
- Umstead Park United Church of Christ
