= Gulf Township, Chatham County, North Carolina =

- Township
- Location of Gulf Township in Chatham County

- Location of Chatham County in North Carolina
- Coordinates: 35.591°N 79.312°W
- Country: United States
- State: North Carolina
- County: Chatham

Area
  - Total: 74.33 sq mi (192.51 km^{2})
- Highest elevation (high point at north end of township): 616 ft (188 m)
- Lowest elevation (Deep River): 208 ft (63 m)

Population (2010)
  - Total: 3,363
  - Density: 45.24/sq mi (17.47/km^{2})
- Time zone: UTC-4 (EST)
  - Summer (DST): UTC-5 (EDT)
- Area codes: 919; 984

Gulf Township, population 3,363, is one of thirteen townships in Chatham County, North Carolina. Gulf Township is 74.33 square miles (192.5 km^{2}) in size and located in southwestern Chatham County. Gulf Township does not contain any towns in it.

== Geography ==
The south and southeastern part of Gulf Township are drained by the Deep River and its tributaries, Cedar Creek, Indian Creek, Bear Creek, and Line Creek. The north is drained by Bear Creek and its tributaries, Harts Creek and Sandy Branch.
