= Bear Creek Township, Chatham County, North Carolina =

Coordinates: 35.564456°N 79.4928857°W

- Township
- Location of Bear Creek Township in Chatham County

- Location of Chatham County in North Carolina
- Country: United States
- State: North Carolina
- County: Chatham

Area
  - Total: 82.22 sq mi (212.96 km^{2})
- Highest elevation (Hinson Hill at the northwestern end of the township): 704 ft (215 m)
- Lowest elevation (Tysons Creek where it flows out of the township at the southeast end): 316 ft (96 m)

Population (2010)
  - Total: 3,602
  - Density: 43.81/sq mi (16.92/km^{2})
- Time zone: UTC-4 (EST)
  - Summer (DST): UTC-5 (EDT)
- Area code: 919 / 984

The Bear Creek Township is a rural settlement located in Chatham County, North Carolina, United States. It has a population of 3,419. The heart of Bear Creek is located at the intersection of NC highway 902 and old US highway 421. Chatham Central High School is one of the primary landmarks. Also, in and around Bear Creek are a post office, hair salon, florist, gas station, and several churches. The area is mainly a residential and farming community. The township is located close to Pittsboro, NC and Siler City, NC.

== Geography ==
Bear Creek Township is drained by tributaries of the Rocky River and of the Deep River. Tributaries of the Rocky River include Tick Creek and Bear Creek, while tributaries of the Deep River are Indian Creek, Tysons Creek, and Little Brush Creek.
