= Falls Creek (Deep River tributary) =

Stream in North Carolina, USA

Falls Creek Tributary to Deep River
- Location of Falls Creek mouth Falls Creek (Deep River tributary) (the United States)

Location
- Country: United States
- State: North Carolina
- County: Moore; Chatham

Physical characteristics
- Source: Bear Creek divide
  - location: Pond about 1 mile northwest of Harpers Crossroads, North Carolina
  - coordinates: 35°34′49″N 079°28′46″W
  - elevation: 505 ft (154 m)
- Mouth: Deep River
  - location: about 0.25 miles southeast of High Falls, North Carolina
  - coordinates: 35°28′51″N 079°30′40″W
  - elevation: 275 ft (84 m)
- Length: 10.80 mi (17.38 km)
- Basin size: 14.34 square miles (37.1 km^{2})
- Discharge
  - location: Deep River
  - average: 18.31 cu ft/s (0.518 m^{3}/s) at mouth with Deep River

Basin features
- Progression: Rocky River → Deep River → Cape Fear River → Atlantic Ocean
- River system: Deep River
- Tributaries
  - left: unnamed tributaries
  - right: unnamed tributaries
- Bridges: Twelve Oaks Lane, NC 902, NC 42, Falls Creek Church Road, Wilson Road, River Road

Falls Creek is a 10.80 mi (17.38 km) long 2nd order tributary to the Deep River in Moore and Chatham Counties, North Carolina.

== Course ==
Falls Creek rises in a pond about 1 mile northwest of Harpers Crossroads, North Carolina in Chatham County and then flows south to join the Deep River about 0.25 miles northwest of High Falls.

== Watershed ==
Falls Creek drains 14.34 square miles (37.1 km^{2}) of area, receives about 47.7 in/year of precipitation, and has a wetness index of 411.24 and is about 53% forested.

== See also ==
- List of rivers of North Carolina
