= North Carolina Highway 902 =

State highway in Chatham County, North Carolina, US

North Carolina Highway 902

Route information
- Maintained by NCDOT
- Length: 24.9 mi (40.1 km)
- Existed: 1929–present
- Tourist routes: Devil's Stompin' Ground Road

Major junctions
- West end: NC 22 / NC 42 near Bennett
- US 421 near Bear Creek
- East end: US 64 Bus. / NC 87 in Pittsboro

Location
- Country: United States
- State: North Carolina
- Counties: Chatham

Highway system
- North Carolina Highway System; Interstate; US; State; Scenic
← NC 901	→ NC 903

North Carolina Highway 902 (NC 902) is a primary state highway in the U.S. state of North Carolina. The highway connects southwest Chatham County with the county seat of Pittsboro. NC 902 is routed through primarily rural areas of the county and travels in a northeastern direction. NC 902 was created in 1929, running from U.S. Route 64 (US 64) near Asheboro to Carthage, but has been truncated to its current routing in the decades since.

== Route description ==
NC 902 begins at NC 22/NC 42 south of Bennett. NC 902 heads east from there and crosses Falls Creek. From there NC 902 turns northeast and goes through Harpers Crossroads at the intersection of Siler City Glendon Road. The road intersects Edwards Hill Church Road (Secondary Road 1141 or SR 1141) on its way to Bear Creek. The road crosses over Bear Creek before reaching the eponymous town about one mile (1.6 km) down the road. When the route finally enters Bear Creek it crosses over a Norfolk Southern railroad and then intersects Old US 421 S. After the road leaves Bear Creek it crosses over Sandy Branch. NC 902 intersects US 421 northeast of Bear Creek and from there continues northeast to cross Landrum Creek. Approximately one mile from the crossing of Landrum Creek, NC 902 turns to the east to parallel US 64. The road turns left on Pittsboro Goldston Road, and starts to again head northeast towards Pittsboro. NC 902 intersects NC 87 just south of downtown Pittsboro and turns north. NC 902 ends at US 64 Business (US 64 Bus.) in downtown Pittsboro.

== History ==
NC 902 first appeared on the North Carolina state highway map running from US 64/NC 90 in Asheboro to NC 74 (now NC 24/NC 27) west of Carthage. By 1933, NC 902 was removed off its routing from Bennett to its western terminus near Carthage. Instead NC 902 was routed along a concurrency with NC 64 and then along new routing to US 421 near Bear Creek.

Between 1958-63, NC 902 was truncated, just south of Bennett, at NC 22/NC 42; the old alignment became part of NC 42. In 1964, NC 902 was extended east to its current eastern terminus at US 64 (now US 64 Bus.) and NC 87 in Pittsboro. In 2000, NC 87 was rerouted onto 0.8 miles (1.3 km) of NC 902 in Pittsboro.

=== Tropical Storm Chantal ===
In 2025, portions of NC 902 sustained severe damage from Tropical Storm Chantal. Damages included multiple culvert washouts and two sections of the route washed away due to heavy rainfall, with one section near Chatham Central Road and another section near Alex Cockman Road.

NC 902 near Chatham Central Road after Tropical Storm Chantal

== Junction list ==
The entire route is in Chatham County.

Location	mi	km	Destinations	Notes
Bennett	0.0	0.0	NC 22 / NC 42 – Coleridge, High Falls, Carthage	
Bear Creek	11.7	18.8	US 421 – Siler City, Sanford	
Pittsboro	24.1	38.8	US 15 south / US 501 south / NC 87 south – Sanford	South end of US 15 / US 501 / NC 87 overlap
Pittsboro	24.9	40.1	US 15 north / US 501 north / NC 87 north / US 64 Bus. (West Street) – Siler City, Mandale	North end of US 15 / US 501 / NC 87 overlap
1.000 mi = 1.609 km; 1.000 km = 0.621 mi: Concurrency terminus
