= Cedar Creek (Deep River tributary, Moore) =

Stream in North Carolina, USA

Cedar Creek Tributary to Deep River
- Location of Cedar Creek Creek mouth Cedar Creek (Deep River tributary, Moore) (the United States)

Location
- Country: United States
- State: North Carolina
- County: Moore; Randolph; Chatham

Physical characteristics
- Source: Flat Creek divide
  - location: about 1.5 miles northwest of High Falls, North Carolina
  - coordinates: 35°33′41″N 079°32′06″W
  - elevation: 485 ft (148 m)
- Mouth: Deep River
  - location: Pond about 0.25 miles southeast of Bennett, North Carolina
  - coordinates: 35°29′42″N 079°32′24″W
  - elevation: 295 ft (90 m)
- Length: 5.62 mi (9.04 km)
- Basin size: 8.02 square miles (20.8 km^{2})
- Discharge
  - location: Deep River
  - average: 9.63 cu ft/s (0.273 m^{3}/s) at mouth with Deep River

Basin features
- Progression: Rocky River → Deep River → Cape Fear River → Atlantic Ocean
- River system: Deep River
- Tributaries
  - left: unnamed tributaries
  - right: unnamed tributaries
- Bridges: E Carthage Street, NC 22, Bernard Purvis Road, Jerry Frye Road, Bernard Purvis Road, George P Road

Cedar Creek is a 5.62 mi (9.04 km) long 2nd order tributary to the Deep River in Moore, Randolph, and Chatham Counties, North Carolina. This stream is one of two streams named Cedar Creek on the left bank of the Deep River. The other Cedar Creek has its confluence in Chatham County.

== Course ==
Cedar Ceeek Creek rises in a pond in Chatham County and then flows south into Moore County to join the Deep River about 1.5 miles northwest of High Falls, North Carolina.

== Watershed ==
Cedar Creek Creek drains 8.02 square miles (20.8 km^{2}) of area, receives about 47.6 in/year of precipitation, and has a wetness index of 414.45 and is about 48% forested.

== See also ==
- List of rivers of North Carolina
