= Patterson Creek (disambiguation) =

Patterson Creek is a creek in West Virginia.

Patterson Creek may also refer to:

- Patterson Creek (Iowa), a stream in Iowa
- Patterson Creek (Buffalo Creek), a stream in Missouri and Oklahoma
- Patterson Creek (Deep River tributary), a stream in Lee County, North Carolina
- Patterson Creek, West Virginia, an unincorporated community
- Patterson Creek (Ottawa), a stream in Ottawa, Canada
- Patterson Creek (Lake Erie), a watershed administered by the Long Point Region Conservation Authority, that drains into Lake Erie
