= Tysons Creek =

Stream in North Carolina, USA

Tysons Creek Tributary to Deep River
- Location of Tysons Creek mouth Tysons Creek (the United States)

Location
- Country: United States
- State: North Carolina
- County: Moore; Chatham

Physical characteristics
- Source: Bear Creek divide
  - location: Pond about 0.25 miles northeast of Harpers Crossroads, North Carolina
  - coordinates: 35°34′29″N 079°27′17″W
  - elevation: 530 ft (160 m)
- Mouth: Deep River
  - location: about 1 mile northwest of Glendon, North Carolina
  - coordinates: 35°29′35″N 079°26′46″W
  - elevation: 228 ft (69 m)
- Length: 8.51 mi (13.70 km)
- Basin size: 12.81 square miles (33.2 km^{2})
- Discharge
  - location: Deep River
  - average: 15.51 cu ft/s (0.439 m^{3}/s) at mouth with Deep River

Basin features
- Progression: Rocky River → Deep River → Cape Fear River → Atlantic Ocean
- River system: Deep River
- Tributaries
  - left: unnamed tributaries
  - right: unnamed tributaries
- Bridges: Siler City-Glendon Road, Mert McManus Road, NC 42, Jesse Phillips Road, River Road

Tysons Creek is a 4.18 mi (6.73 km) long 3rd order tributary to the Deep River in Moore County, North Carolina. This is the only stream in the United States by this name.

== Course ==
Tysons Creek rises in a pond about 0.25 miles northeast of Harpers Crossroads in Chatham County and then flows south into Moore County to join the Deep River about 1 mile northwest of Glendon, North Carolina.

== Watershed ==
Tysons Creek drains 12.81 square miles (33.2 km^{2}) of area, receives about 47.8 in/year of precipitation, and has a wetness index of 400.09 and is about 51% forested.

== See also ==
- List of rivers of North Carolina
