= McLendons Creek =

Stream in North Carolina, USA

McLendons Creek Tributary to Deep River
- Location of McLendons Creek mouth McLendons Creek (the United States)

Location
- Country: United States
- State: North Carolina
- County: Moore

Physical characteristics
- Source: Drowning Creek divide
  - location: about 0.25 miles southeast of Elberta, North Carolina
  - coordinates: 35°17′10″N 079°37′49″W
  - elevation: 595 ft (181 m)
- Mouth: Deep River
  - location: about 1.5 miles southeast of Glendon, North Carolina
  - coordinates: 35°27′42″N 079°23′23″W
  - elevation: 226 ft (69 m)
- Length: 28.20 mi (45.38 km)
- Basin size: 101.21 square miles (262.1 km^{2})
- Discharge
  - location: Deep River
  - average: 111.48 cu ft/s (3.157 m^{3}/s) at mouth with Deep River

Basin features
- Progression: Deep River → Cape Fear River → Atlantic Ocean
- River system: Deep River
- Tributaries
  - left: Suck Creek; Richland Creek; Persimmon Glade Branch
  - right: Big Juniper Creek; Little Creek
- Bridges: Mount Carmel Road, Bethlehem Road, NC 24, Coles Mill Road, Cool Springs Road, Glendon-Carthage Road

McLendons Creek is a 28.20 mi (45.38 km) long 4th order tributary to the Deep River in Moore County, North Carolina. This creek is the only stream of this name in the United States.

== Variant names ==
According to the Geographic Names Information System, it has also been known historically as:

- Buck Creek

== Course ==
McLendons Creek rises about 0.25 miles southeast of Elberta in Moore County and then flows northeast to join the Deep River about 1.5 miles southeast of Glendon, North Carolina.

== Watershed ==
McLendons Creek drains 101.21 square miles (262.1 km^{2}) of area, receives about 48.6 in/year of precipitation, and has a wetness index of 407.24 and is about 60% forested.

== See also ==
- List of rivers of North Carolina
