= Gabriels Creek =

Stream in North Carolina, USA

Gabriels Creek Tributary to Deep River
- Location of Gabriels Creek mouth Gabriels Creek (the United States)

Location
- Country: United States
- State: North Carolina
- County: Randolph

Physical characteristics
- Source: Squirrel Creek divide
  - location: Pond about 0.5 miles east of Asheboro, North Carolina
  - coordinates: 35°42′40″N 079°45′10″W
  - elevation: 805 ft (245 m)
- Mouth: Deep River
  - location: about 0.5 miles west of Cedar Falls, North Carolina
  - coordinates: 35°45′04″N 079°44′40″W
  - elevation: 535 ft (163 m)
- Length: 4.62 mi (7.44 km)
- Basin size: 6.89 square miles (17.8 km^{2})
- Discharge
  - location: Deep River
  - average: 8.26 cu ft/s (0.234 m^{3}/s) at mouth with Deep River

Basin features
- Progression: Deep River → Cape Fear River → Atlantic Ocean
- River system: Deep River
- Tributaries
  - left: unnamed tributaries
  - right: unnamed tributaries
- Bridges: Vista Parkway, Luck Road, Trogdon Hill Road, US 64-NC 49, Old Cedar Falls Road

Gabriels Creek is a 4.62 mi (7.44 km) long 2nd order tributary to the Deep River in Randolph County, North Carolina. Gabriels Creek is the only stream in the United States by this name in the plural. There are two other streams by the name of Gabriel Creek (no s).

== Course ==
Gabriels Creek rises in a pond about 0.5 miles east of Asheboro in Randolph County, North Carolina and then flows northeast to join the Deep River about 0.5 miles west of Cedar Falls, North Carolina.

== Watershed ==
Gabriels Creek drains 6.89 square miles (17.8 km^{2}) of area, receives about 46.9 in/year of precipitation, and has a wetness index of 374.54 and is about 60% forested.
