= Scotchman Creek (Deep River tributary) =

Stream in North Carolina, USA

Scotchman Creek Tributary to Deep River
- Location of Scotchman Creek mouth Scotchman Creek (Deep River tributary) (the United States)

Location
- Country: United States
- State: North Carolina
- County: Moore

Physical characteristics
- Source: Buffalo Creek divide
  - location: about 1 mile northwest of Parkland, North Carolina
  - coordinates: 35°26′23″N 079°30′43″W
  - elevation: 420 ft (130 m)
- Mouth: Deep River
  - location: about 2.5 miles southeast of High Falls, North Carolina
  - coordinates: 35°28′01″N 079°29′12″W
  - elevation: 260 ft (79 m)
- Length: 3.10 mi (4.99 km)
- Basin size: 5.33 square miles (13.8 km^{2})
- Discharge
  - location: Deep River
  - average: 6.56 cu ft/s (0.186 m^{3}/s) at mouth with Deep River

Basin features
- Progression: Deep River → Cape Fear River → Atlantic Ocean
- River system: Deep River
- Tributaries
  - left: unnamed tributaries
  - right: Lick Creek
- Bridges: Spence Road, NC 22

Scotchman Creek is a 3.10 mi (4.99 km) long 2nd order tributary to the Deep River in Moore County, North Carolina.

== Course ==
Scotchman Creek rises about 1 mile northwest of Parkland, North Carolina in Moore County and then flows northeast to join the Deep River about 2.5 miles northwest of High Falls, North Carolina.

== Watershed ==
Scotchman Creek drains 5.33 square miles (13.8 km^{2}) of area, receives about 48.1 in/year of precipitation, and has a wetness index of 396.73 and is about 73% forested.

== See also ==
- List of rivers of North Carolina
