= Grassy Creek (Deep River tributary) =

Stream in North Carolina, USA

Grassy Creek Tributary to Deep River
- Location of Grassy Creek mouth Grassy Creek (Deep River tributary) (the United States)

Location
- Country: United States
- State: North Carolina
- County: Moore

Physical characteristics
- Source: Reedy Creek divide
  - location: about 0.25 miles northeast of Westmoore School
  - coordinates: 35°29′26″N 079°40′22″W
  - elevation: 542 ft (165 m)
- Mouth: Deep River
  - location: about 3 miles west of High Falls, North Carolina
  - coordinates: 35°29′22″N 079°34′46″W
  - elevation: 312 ft (95 m)
- Length: 7.56 mi (12.17 km)
- Basin size: 12.57 square miles (32.6 km^{2})
- Discharge
  - location: Deep River
  - average: 14.73 cu ft/s (0.417 m^{3}/s) at mouth with Deep River

Basin features
- Progression: Deep River → Cape Fear River → Atlantic Ocean
- River system: Deep River
- Tributaries
  - left: unnamed tributaries
  - right: unnamed tributaries
- Bridges: Needham Grove Road, Smyrna Church Road, N Howard Mill Road, Reynolds Mill Road

Grassy Creek is a 7.56 mi (12.17 km) long 3rd order tributary to the Deep River in Moore County, North Carolina.

== Course ==
Grassy Creek rises about 0.25 miles northeast of Westmoore School in Moore County and then flows east to join the Deep River about 3 miles west of High Falls, North Carolina.

== Watershed ==
Grassy Creek drains 12.57 square miles (32.6 km^{2}) of area, receives about 47.6 in/year of precipitation, and has a wetness index of 423.32 and is about 54% forested.

== See also ==
- List of rivers of North Carolina
