= Reed Creek =

Reed Creek may refer to:

- Reed Creek, Georgia, a community
- Reed Creek (Susquehanna River), a tributary of the Susquehanna River in New York
- Reed Creek (Deep River tributary), a stream in Randolph County, North Carolina
- Reed Creek (Virginia), a creek
- Reid Creek, Montana
- Read Creek, New York
