= Deep River (North Carolina) =

River in North Carolina, USA

Deep River Tributary to Cape Fear River
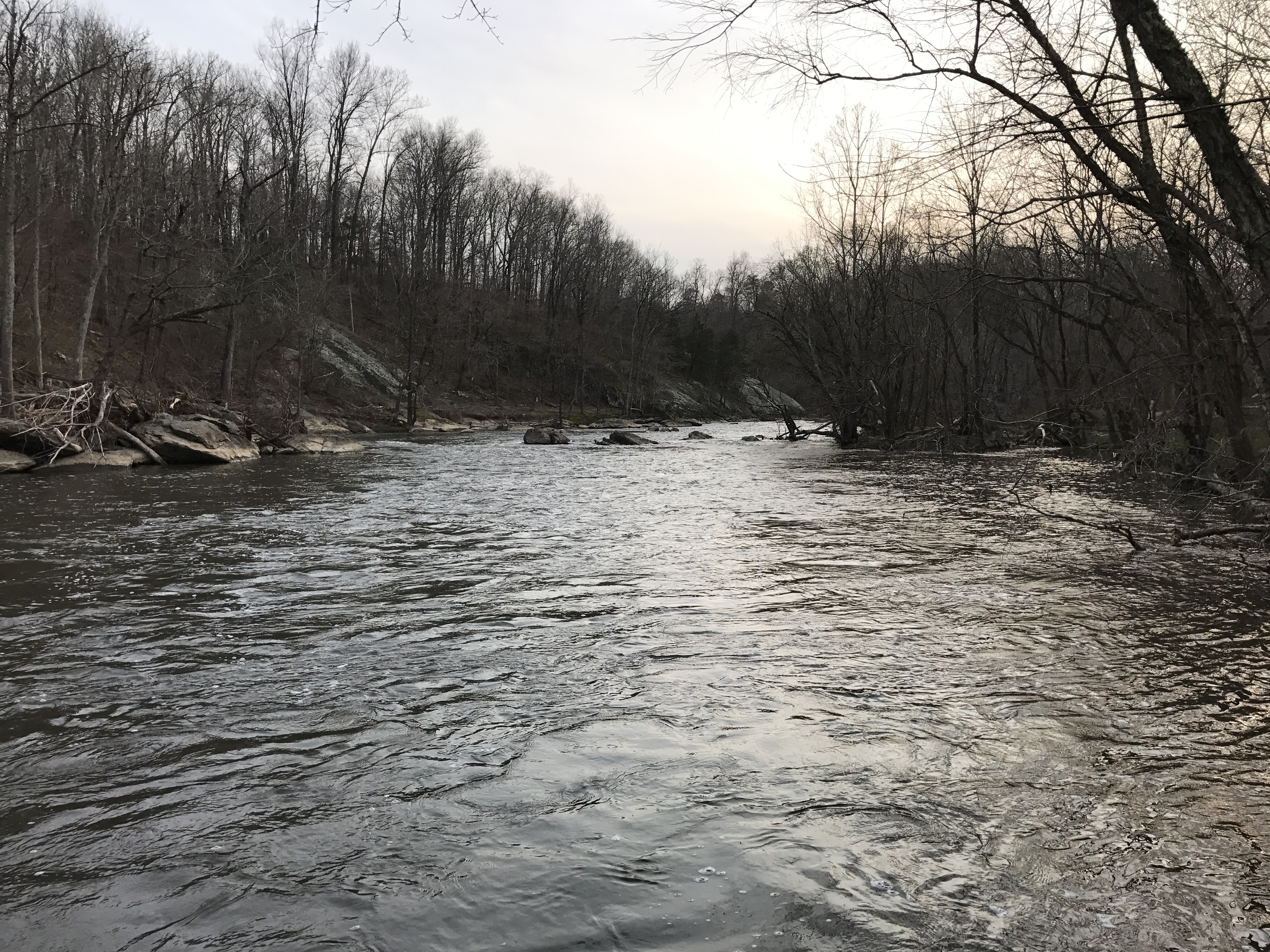
- The Deep River in Franklinville, North Carolina

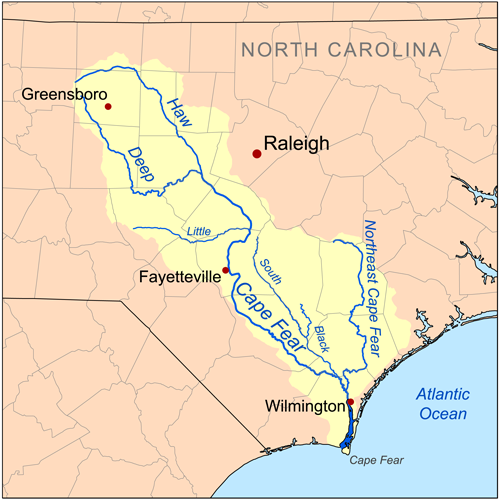
- Map of the Cape Fear drainage basin showing Deep River

Location
- Country: United States
- State: North Carolina
- Counties: Chatham; Guilford; Lee; Moore; Randolph
- Cities: Ramseur; Franklinville; Randleman

Physical characteristics
- Source: confluence of West and East Fork of Deep River
  - location: High Point, North Carolina
  - coordinates: 35°59′44″N 079°56′44″W
  - elevation: 757 ft (231 m)
- Mouth: Cape Fear River
  - location: Moncure, North Carolina
  - coordinates: 35°35′48″N 079°03′11″W
  - elevation: 160 ft (49 m)
- Length: 112.97 mi (181.81 km)
- Basin size: 1,450.17 square miles (3,755.9 km^{2})
- Discharge
  - location: Cape Fear River
  - average: 1,525.72 cu ft/s (43.204 m^{3}/s) at mouth with Cape Fear River

Basin features
- Progression: Cape Fear River → Atlantic Ocean
- River system: Cape Fear River
- Tributaries
  - left: East Fork of Deep River; Bull Run; Hickory Creek; Polecat Creek; Bush Creek; Sandy Creek; Reed Creek; Millstone Creek; Broad Mouth Branch; Back Branch; Brush Creek; Flat Creek; Cedar Creek; Falls Creek; Tysons Creek; Line Creek; Indian Creek; Cedar Creek; Georges Creek; Rocky River; Rocky Branch
  - right: West Fork Deep River; Copper Branch; Richland Creek; Muddy Creek; Hasketts Creek; Gabriels Creek; Mill Creek; Richland Creek; Fork Creek; Grassy Creek; Bear Creek; Buffalo Creek; Scotchman Creek; Lick Creek; McLendons Creek; Big Governors Creek; Smiths Creek; Pocket Creek; Patterson Creek; Big Buffalo Creek; Little Buffalo Creek
- Waterbodies: High Point City Lake

Deep River is a tributary of the Cape Fear River, approximately 125 miles (201 km) long, in north central North Carolina in the United States. Deep River is a translation of the Indian name sapponah, "deep river".

Paddling is popular on the river. Deep River is flanked by the planned Deep River State Trail and several other parks and preservation areas including Carbonton Dam Park, House in the Horseshoe Historic Site, Deep River Park and Deep River Camelback Truss Bridge, Endor Iron Furnace, White Pines Nature Preserve, Lockville Dam, Canal and Powerhouse, and Mermaid Point.

There river is habitat to two federally-endangered species, the Cape Fear shiner, a critically endangered minnow, and the Atlantic Pigtoe, an endangered mussel.

== Course ==
Deep River rises in the Piedmont country in western Guilford County, east of Kernersville. It flows southeast past High Point and Randleman, forming the Randleman Lake. It passes northeast of Asheboro, then flows east to Franklinville then to Ramseur, then passing north of Sanford. The Rocky River enters the Deep River at the White Pines Nature Preserve. Deep River joins Haw River at Mermaid Point near Moncure to form the Cape Fear River.

== Dams ==
Deep River has 12 dams or relict dam structures and is the source river of the Randleman lake project that covers 3,000 acres (12 km^{2}) of property on the river near U.S. Route 220. The river crosses the Fall Line of North Carolina, an area where rivers are quite rocky and have a moderately high gradient. This gradient was used to power mills along the river to support the early textile industry in North Carolina. The river, popular with canoeists, was a center of a great deal of activity during the American Revolution at places such as Franklinville and the House In The Horseshoe.

The Lockville Dam, built of stone, is the only portion of the 19th-century Deep River lock and dam system that remains today.

Until recently, the Deep River was host to the Carbonton Dam, the largest dam on the river at 17 feet (5.2 m) high and 270 feet (82 m) wide. In the fall of 2005, the dam was removed for the purpose of creating environmental mitigation credit by Restoration Systems, LLC, a leading environmental mitigation company in North Carolina. The project restored 10 miles (16 km) of the former impoundment around the House in the Horseshoe to free-flowing river.

== Tributaries ==
Tributaries of the Deep River in Chatham and Lee Counties
Name, Bank	Watershed Area in Square Miles (km^{2})	Average Discharge	Stream Length	Mouth Coordinates	Mouth Elevation	Source Coordinates	Source Elevation	% of Average Discharge	Remarks
Mouth	1,450.17 square miles (3,755.9 km^{2})	1,525.72 cu ft/s (43.204 m^{3}/s)	112.97 mi (181.81 km)	35°35′48″N 079°03′11″W	160 ft (49 m)	35°59′44″N 079°56′44″W	757 ft (231 m)	N/A	The Deep River is formed at the confluence of the East and West Fork in High Point, North Carolina and flows southeast and east to join the Haw River to form the Cape Fear River near Moncure, North Carolina.
Rocky Branch, left bank	5.02 square miles (13.0 km^{2})	6.19 cu ft/s (0.175 m^{3}/s)	4.98 mi (8.01 km)	35°37′26″N 079°08′07″W	188 ft (57 m)	35°40′25″N 079°09′36″W	455 ft (139 m)	< 1%	Rocky Branch rises in a pond about 2 miles south of Pittsboro, North Carolina on the divide between Rocky Branch and Turkey Creek. Rocky Branch is a 2nd order tributary that flows generally south to meet the Deep River about 1 mile northeast of Blacknel, North Carolina.
Rocky River, left bank	243.42 square miles (630.5 km^{2})	262.64 cu ft/s (7.437 m^{3}/s)	42.50 mi (68.40 km)	35°37′02″N 079°09′01″W	198 ft (60 m)	35°50′56″N 079°34′31″W	755 ft (230 m)	17%	Rocky River rises in a pond in Liberty, North Carolina at the Rocky River, Sandy Creek, and North Prong divide. From the divide it flows in a southeasterly direction through the middle of Chatham County to meet the Deep River about 3 miles west of Moncure, North Carolina. Rocky River is the largest tributary in area and discharge on the Deep River.
Little Buffalo Creek, right bank	8.20 square miles (21.2 km^{2})	9.80 cu ft/s (0.278 m^{3}/s)	9.33 mi (15.02 km)	35°34′44″N 079°11′21″W	198 ft (60 m)	35°27′43″N 079°09′12″W	400 ft (120 m)	< 1%	Little Buffalo Creek rises in Sanford, North Carolina on the Gasters Creek divide and then takes a northerly course to meet the Deep River about 2 miles east-northeast of Farmville, North Carolina. This stream contributes less than 1% of the average discharge of the Deep River.
Georges Creek, left bank	12.88 square miles (33.4 km^{2})	15.15 cu ft/s (0.429 m^{3}/s)	8.25 mi (13.28 km)	35°34′01″N 079°12′00″W	200 ft (61 m)	35°37′45″N 079°16′38″W	445 ft (136 m)	1%	Georges Creek, a 3rd order tributary rises in a pond on the Bear Creek divide about 2 miles northeast of Goldston, North Carolina. Georges Creek takes a southeasterly course to meet the Deep River about 0.5 miles east of Farmville, North Carolina.
Big Buffalo Creek, right bank	20.28 square miles (52.5 km^{2})	23.35 cu ft/s (0.661 m^{3}/s)	7.48 mi (12.04 km)	35°33′08″N 079°13′34″W	205 ft (62 m)	35°28′33″N 079°11′48″W	285 ft (87 m)	1.5%	Big Buffalo Creek, a 3rd order tributary, is formed at the confluence of Skunk Creek and Persimmon Creek in Sanford, North Carolina. From the confluence it flows northwest and then curves east and north to meet the Deep River 0.25 miles southeast of Cumnock, North Carolina.
Cedar Creek, left bank	13.19 square miles (34.2 km^{2})	15.50 cu ft/s (0.439 m^{3}/s)	5.41 mi (8.71 km)	35°34′04″N 079°14′41″W	208 ft (63 m)	35°35′48″N 079°18′18″W	390 ft (120 m)	1%	Cedar Creek, a 3rd order tributary, rises about 0.5 miles east of Goldston, North Carolina on the Bear Creek divide. It then takes a southeasterly course to meet the Deep River about 1 mile east-northeast of Gulf, North Carolina. This stream is one of two Cedar Creeks on the left bank of the Deep River.
Patterson Creek, right bank	7.22 square miles (18.7 km^{2})	8.64 cu ft/s (0.245 m^{3}/s)	7.72 mi (12.42 km)	35°32′34″N 079°15′21″W	208 ft (63 m)	35°27′57″N 079°13′32″W	425 ft (130 m)	< 1%	Patterson Creek, a 2nd order tributary, rises in a pond about 1 mile north of Sanford, North Carolina on the Persimmon Creek and Raccoon Creek divide. Patterson Creek then flows north to meet the Deep River about 1.5 miles southeast of Gulf, North Carolina.
Pocket Creek, right bank	37.65 square miles (97.5 km^{2})	42.61 cu ft/s (1.207 m^{3}/s)	16.44 mi (26.46 km)	35°32′03″N 079°16′49″W	208 ft (63 m)	35°23′11″N 079°16′46″W	475 ft (145 m)	2.8%	Pocket Creek, a 3rd order tributary, rises in a pond in White Hill, North Carolina on the Herds Creek divide. Pocket Creek then flows north to meet the Deep River about 1.5 miles south of Gulf, North Carolina.
Indian Creek, left bank	25.92 square miles (67.1 km^{2})	29.95 cu ft/s (0.848 m^{3}/s)	7.15 mi (11.51 km)	35°32′40″N 079°19′26″W	210 ft (64 m)	35°35′46″N 079°21′07″W	440 ft (130 m)	2%	Indian Creek, a 3rd order tributary, rises about 0.5 miles west of Goldston, North Carolina on the Bear Creek divide. Indian Creek then flows roughly southeast to meet the Deep River about 1.5 miles southwest of Gulf, North Carolina.
Smiths Creek, right bank	3.56 square miles (9.2 km^{2})	4.37 cu ft/s (0.124 m^{3}/s)	4.18 mi (6.73 km)	35°31′57″N 079°18′40″W	210 ft (64 m)	35°29′09″N 079°18′53″W	337 ft (103 m)	< 1%	Smiths Creek, a 2nd order tributary, rises about 1.5 miles southwest of Gulf, North Carolina on the Little Pocket Creek divide. Smiths Creek then flows north to meet the Deep River about 1 mile southwest of Ebenezer Church.
Line Creek, left bank	2.20 square miles (5.7 km^{2})	2.76 cu ft/s (0.078 m^{3}/s)	2.96 mi (4.76 km)	35°31′05″N 079°21′01″W	225 ft (69 m)	35°31′49″N 079°23′06″W	418 ft (127 m)	< 1%	Line Creek, a 1st order tributary, rises in a pond about 3 miles northwest of Carbonton, North Carolina. Line Creek then takes an easterly course to meet the Deep River at Carbonton, North Carolina.
Big Governors Creek, right bank	40.87 square miles (105.9 km^{2})	46.70 cu ft/s (1.322 m^{3}/s)	13.71 mi (22.06 km)	35°28′39″N 079°21′35″W	226 ft (69 m)	35°22′15″N 079°18′25″W	465 ft (142 m)	3.1%	Big Governors Creek, a 3rd order tributary, about 0.5 miles southwest of White Hill, North Carolina. Big Governors Creek then flows northwest and north to meet the Deep River about 1.5 miles southeast of Haw Branch, North Carolina.

Tributaries of the Deep River in Moore County
Name, Bank	Watershed Area in Square Miles (km^{2})	Average Discharge	Stream Length	Mouth Coordinates	Mouth Elevation	Source Coordinates	Source Elevation	% of Average Discharge	Remarks
McLendons Creek, right bank	101.21 square miles (262.1 km^{2})	111.48 cu ft/s (3.157 m^{3}/s)	28.20 mi (45.38 km)	35°27′42″N 079°23′23″W	226 ft (69 m)	35°17′10″N 079°37′49″W	595 ft (181 m)	7.3%	McLendons Creek, a 4th order tributary, rises about 0.25 miles southeast of Elberta, North Carolina on the Drowning Creek divide. It then flows northeast to meet the Deep River about 1.5 miles northeast of Glendon, North Carolina.
Lick Creek, right bank	8.35 square miles (21.6 km^{2})	2.95 cu ft/s (0.084 m^{3}/s)	4.53 mi (7.29 km)	35°28′24″N 079°23′30″W	228 ft (69 m)	35°28′27″N 079°26′26″W	385 ft (117 m)	< 1%	Lick Creek, a 1st order tributary, rises in a pond about 1 mile southwest of Glendon, North Carolina on the divide of an unnamed tributary to the Deep River. Lick Creek then flows easterly to meet the Deep River about 1 mile southeast of Glendon.
Tysons Creek, left bank	12.81 square miles (33.2 km^{2})	15.51 cu ft/s (0.439 m^{3}/s)	8.51 mi (13.70 km)	35°29′35″N 079°26′46″W	228 ft (69 m)	35°34′29″N 079°27′17″W	530 ft (160 m)	1%	Tysons Creek, a 3rd order tributary, rises in a pond about 3.5 miles southwest of Harpers Crossroads, North Carolina in Chatham County on the Falls Creek divide. It then flows south into Moore County and meets the Deep River about 1 mile northwest of Glendon, North Carolina.
Scotchman Creek, right bank	5.33 square miles (13.8 km^{2})	6.56 cu ft/s (0.186 m^{3}/s)	3.10 mi (4.99 km)	35°28′01″N 079°29′12″W	260 ft (79 m)	35°26′23″N 079°30′43″W	420 ft (130 m)	< 1%	Scotchman Creek, a 2nd order tributary, rises about 1 mile northwest of Parkland, North Carolina on the Buffalo Creek divide. It then flows northeast to meet the Deep River about 2.5 miles southeast of High Falls, North Carolina.
Buffalo Creek, right bank	21.80 square miles (56.5 km^{2})	25.79 cu ft/s (0.730 m^{3}/s)	12.73 mi (20.49 km)	35°28′39″N 079°30′20″W	265 ft (81 m)	35°22′16″N 079°33′38″W	615 ft (187 m)	1.7%	Buffalo Creek, a 3rd order tributary, rises in a pond about 0.5 miles northeast of Zion Grove, North Carolina on the Suck Creek divide. It then flows north to meet the Deep River about 0.5 miles southeast of High Falls, North Carolina.
Falls Creek, left bank	18.34 square miles (47.5 km^{2})	16.95 cu ft/s (0.480 m^{3}/s)	10.80 mi (17.38 km)	35°28′51″N 079°30′40″W	275 ft (84 m)	35°34′49″N 079°28′46″W	505 ft (154 m)	1.1%	Falls Creek, a 2nd order tributary, rises in a pond about 1 mile northwest of Harpers Crossroads, North Carolina in Chatham County on the Bear Creek divide. It then follows a southerly course to Moore County and meets the Deep River about 0.25 miles southeast of High Falls, North Carolina.
Cedar Creek, left bank	8.02 square miles (20.8 km^{2})	9.63 cu ft/s (0.273 m^{3}/s)	5.62 mi (9.04 km)	35°29′42″N 079°32′24″W	295 ft (90 m)	35°31′41″N 079°32′06″W	485 ft (148 m)	< 1%	Cedar Creek, a 2nd order tributary, rises in a pond about 0.25 miles southeast of Bennett, North Carolina in Chatham County on the Flat Creek divide. It then takes a southerly course into Moore County to meet the Deep River about 1.5 miles northwest of High Falls, North Carolina. This stream is one of two Cedar Creeks on the left bank of the Deep River.
Bear Creek, right bank	145.43 square miles (376.7 km^{2})	155.13 cu ft/s (4.393 m^{3}/s)	21.78 mi (35.05 km)	35°28′47″N 079°33′16″W	298 ft (91 m)	35°32′07″N 079°46′04″W	700 ft (210 m)	10.2%	Bear Creek, a 4th order tributary, rises in a pond in Seagrove, North Carolina in Randolph County on the Asheworth Branch divide. Bear Creek then flows southeast and curves northeast to meet the Deep River about 1 mile west of High Falls, North Carolina. Bear Creek is the second largest tributary in area and discharge on the Deep River.
Grassy Creek, right bank	12.57 square miles (32.6 km^{2})	14.73 cu ft/s (0.417 m^{3}/s)	7.56 mi (12.17 km)	35°29′22″N 079°34′46″W	312 ft (95 m)	35°29′26″N 079°40′22″W	542 ft (165 m)	1.0%	Grassy Creek, a 3rd order tributary, rises about 0.25 miles northeast of Westmoore School on the Reedy Creek divide. It then flows east to meet the Deep River about 3 miles west of High Falls, North Carolina.

Tributaries of the Deep River in Randolph County
Name, Bank	Watershed Area in Square Miles (km^{2})	Average Discharge	Stream Length	Mouth Coordinates	Mouth Elevation	Source Coordinates	Source Elevation	% of Average Discharge	Remarks
Fork Creek, right bank	48.28 square miles (125.0 km^{2})	53.98 cu ft/s (1.529 m^{3}/s)	15.46 mi (24.88 km)	35°31′04″N 079°35′57″W	326 ft (99 m)	35°35′25″N 079°46′08″W	665 ft (203 m)	3.5%	Fork Creek, a 4th order tributary, rises about 1 mile northeast of Michfield, North Carolina on the Bachelor Creek divide. Fork Creek then flows southeast to meet the Deep River 3 miles east-northeast of Jugtown, North Carolina.
Flat Creek, left bank	14.24 square miles (36.9 km^{2})	16.87 cu ft/s (0.478 m^{3}/s)	9.07 mi (14.60 km)	35°32′49″N 079°35′09″W	329 ft (100 m)	35°36′36″N 079°30′38″W	535 ft (163 m)	1%	Flat Creek, a 2nd order tributary, rises in a pond about 4 miles northwest of Harpers Crossroads, North Carolina in Chatham County on the Little Brush Creek divide. It then flows southwest to Randolph County to meet the Deep River about 2 miles southwest of Bennett, North Carolina.
Brush Creek, left bank	180.01 square miles (466.2 km^{2})	80.67 cu ft/s (2.284 m^{3}/s)	23.09 mi (37.16 km)	35°35′32″N 079°36′27″W	347 ft (106 m)	35°47′30″N 079°35′32″W	685 ft (209 m)	5.3%	Brush Creek, a 3rd order tributary, rises about 1.5 miles west of Staley, North Carolina on the Mount Pleasant Creek divide. Bruah Creek then flows southeast into Chatham County and then turns southwest back into Randolph County to meet the Deep River about 1 mile west of Cheeks, North Carolina.
Richland Creek, right bank	66.06 square miles (171.1 km^{2})	73.18 cu ft/s (2.072 m^{3}/s)	15.00 mi (24.14 km)	35°36′34″N 079°36′26″W	351 ft (107 m)	35°38′39″N 079°46′39″W	573 ft (175 m)	4.8%	Richland Creek, a 4th order tributary, is formed at the confluence of the North and South Prong southeast of Harvey Mountain. Richland Creek then flows southeast to meet the Deep River about 1 mile northwest of Cheeks, North Carolina.
Back Branch, left bank	3.29 square miles (8.5 km^{2})	4.15 cu ft/s (0.118 m^{3}/s)	4.54 mi (7.31 km)	35°38′52″N 079°37′14″W	398 ft (121 m)	35°40′45″N 079°35′27″W	655 ft (200 m)	< 1%	Back Branch, a 2nd order tributary, rises about 2 miles northeast of Coleridge, North Carolina on the Broad Mouth Branch divide. Back Branch then flows southwest to meet the Deep River about 0.25 miles north of Coleridge.
Broad Mouth Branch, left bank	2.15 square miles (5.6 km^{2})	2.80 cu ft/s (0.079 m^{3}/s)	2.67 mi (4.30 km)	35°39′53″N 079°37′21″W	399 ft (122 m)	35°40′32″N 079°35′41″W	605 ft (184 m)	< 1%	Broad Mouth Branch, a 1st order tributary, rises in a pond about 2.5 miles northeast of Coleridge, North Carolina on the Back Branch divide. Broad Mouth Branch then flows southwest to meet the Deep River about 1.5 miles north of Coleridge.
Millstone Creek, left bank	10.02 square miles (26.0 km^{2})	12.34 cu ft/s (0.349 m^{3}/s)	7.08 mi (11.39 km)	35°40′39″N 079°37′40″W	405 ft (123 m)	35°43′43″N 079°35′53″W	625 ft (191 m)	< 1%	Millstone Creek, 3rd order tributary, rises about 0.1 miles south of Browns Crossroads, North Carolina on the Brush Creek divide. Millstone Creek then flows southwest to meet the Deep River about 2 miles southwest of Parks Crossroads, North Carolina.
Mill Creek, right bank	17.95 square miles (46.5 km^{2})	20.97 cu ft/s (0.594 m^{3}/s)	10.02 mi (16.13 km)	35°41′04″N 079°38′03″W	407 ft (124 m)	35°43′19″N 079°44′39″W	685 ft (209 m)	1.4%	Mill Creek, a 3rd order tributary, rises in a pond about 2 miles northwest of Fox Mountain on the Gabriels Creek divide. Mill Creek then flows southeast to meet the Deep River about 2 southwest of Parks Crossroads, North Carolina.
Reed Creek, left bank	10.12 square miles (26.2 km^{2})	12.43 cu ft/s (0.352 m^{3}/s)	9.63 mi (15.50 km)	35°42′28″N 079°38′45″W	415 ft (126 m)	35°47′16″N 079°35′29″W	710 ft (220 m)	< 1%	Reed Creek, a 3rd order tributary, rises about 0.5 miles west of Staley, North Carolina on the Brush Creek and Mount Pleasant Creek divide. Reed Creek then flows southwest to meet the Deep River about 1 mile south of Ramseur, North Carolina.
Sandy Creek, left bank	60.03 square miles (155.5 km^{2})	67.94 cu ft/s (1.924 m^{3}/s)	19.94 mi (32.09 km)	35°45′55″N 079°40′18″W	435 ft (133 m)	35°54′39″N 079°41′23″W	805 ft (245 m)	4.5%	Sandy Creek, a 4th order tributary, rises in a pond about 1 mile east of Climax, North Carolina in Guilford County on the Climax Creek divide. Sandy Creek then takes a southerly course into Randolph County to meet the Deep River at Ramseur, North Carolina.
Bush Creek, left bank	13.41 square miles (34.7 km^{2})	15.83 cu ft/s (0.448 m^{3}/s)	7.97 mi (12.83 km)	35°44′44″N 079°42′22″W	438 ft (134 m)	35°50′38″N 079°42′56″W	805 ft (245 m)	1%	Bush Creek, a 3rd order tributary, rises in a pond about 0.5 miles southwest of Lineberry, North Carolina on the Little Polecat Creek divide. Bush Creek then flows south to meet the Deep River at Franklinville, North Carolina.
Gabriels Creek, right bank	6.89 square miles (17.8 km^{2})	8.26 cu ft/s (0.234 m^{3}/s)	4.62 mi (7.44 km)	35°45′04″N 079°44′40″W	515 ft (157 m)	35°42′40″N 079°45′10″W	805 ft (245 m)	< 1%	Gabriels Creek, a 2nd order tributary, rises in a pond about 0.5 miles east of Asheboro, North Carolina on the Squirrel Creek divide. Gabriels Creek then flows northeast to meet the Deep River about 0.5 miles west of Cedar Falls, North Carolina.
Hasketts Creek, right bank	14.20 square miles (36.8 km^{2})	14.33 cu ft/s (0.406 m^{3}/s)	7.25 mi (11.67 km)	35°46′05″N 079°46′29″W	565 ft (172 m)	35°42′25″N 079°49′11″W	810 ft (250 m)	< 1%	Hasketts Creek, a 3rd order tributary, rises in Asheboro, North Carolina on the Cedar Fork Creek divide. Hasketts Creek then flows north-northeast to meet the Deep River about 0.25 miles north of Central Falls, North Carolina.
Polecat Creek, left bank	56.27 square miles (145.7 km^{2})	62.63 cu ft/s (1.773 m^{3}/s)	18.91 mi (30.43 km)	35°48′12″N 079°46′39″W	582 ft (177 m)	35°59′46″N 079°48′28″W	830 ft (250 m)	4.1%	Polecat Creek, a 4th order tributary, rises on the south end of Greensboro, North Carolina in Guilford County on the South Buffalo Creek divide. Polecat Creek then takes a southerly course into Randolph County to meet the Deep River at Worthville, North Carolina.
Muddy Creek, right bank	26.45 square miles (68.5 km^{2})	29.94 cu ft/s (0.848 m^{3}/s)	14.28 mi (22.98 km)	35°50′50″N 079°49′48″W	628 ft (191 m)	35°55′08″N 079°59′54″W	805 ft (245 m)	2%	Muddy Creek, a 4th order tributary, rises in Archdale, North Carolina in Guilford County on the Mile Branch divide. Muddy Creek then flows southeast into Randolph County to meet the Deep River about 1.5 miles northwest of Randleman, North Carolina.

Tributaries of the Deep River in Guilford County
Name, Bank	Watershed Area in Square Miles (km^{2})	Average Discharge	Stream Length	Mouth Coordinates	Mouth Elevation	Source Coordinates	Source Elevation	% of Average Discharge	Remarks
Hickory Creek, left bank	20.49 square miles (53.1 km^{2})	22.94 cu ft/s (0.650 m^{3}/s)	7.23 mi (11.64 km)	35°55′39″N 079°52′08″W	655 ft (200 m)	36°00′47″N 079°51′15″W	805 ft (245 m)	1.5%	Hickory Creek, a 3rd order tributary, rises at the south end of Greensboro, North Carolina on the South Buffalo Creek divide. Hickory Creek then takes a southerly course to meet the Deep River about 2 miles southeast of Freeman Mill, North Carolina.
Richland Creek, left bank	16.11 square miles (41.7 km^{2})	18.31 cu ft/s (0.518 m^{3}/s)	8.76 mi (14.10 km)	35°56′27″N 079°53′57″W	678 ft (207 m)	35°56′27″N 080°01′09″W	870 ft (270 m)	1.2%	Richland Creek, a 3rd order tributary, rises in High Point, North Carolina on the Payne Creek divide. Richland Creek then takes an easterly course to meet the Deep River about 3 miles southeast of High Point. This stream is one of two tributaries named Richland Creek to the Deep River. The other is in Randolph County.
Copper Branch, right bank	1.0 square mile (2.6 km^{2})	1.26 cu ft/s (0.036 m^{3}/s)	1.50 mi (2.41 km)	35°57′58″N 079°54′50″W	680 ft (210 m)	35°57′47″N 079°56′14″W	790 ft (240 m)	< 1%	Copper Branch, a 1st order tributary, rises about 1 mile east of High Point, North Carolina on the divide of an unnamed tributary. Copper Branch then flows east to meet the Deep River about 2 miles east of High Point.
Bull Run, left bank	7.78 square miles (20.2 km^{2})	8.87 cu ft/s (0.251 m^{3}/s)	6.64 mi (10.69 km)	35°58′47″N 079°55′42″W	688 ft (210 m)	36°03′14″N 079°54′40″W	885 ft (270 m)	< 1%	Bull Run, a 3rd order tributary, rises in a pond about 1 mile west of Greensboro, North Carolina on the Long Branch divide. Bull Run then flows southwest to meet the Deep River about 0.1 miles southwest of Oakdale, North Carolina.
West Fork Deep River, right bank	39.71 square miles (102.8 km^{2})	42.73 cu ft/s (1.210 m^{3}/s)	12.76 mi (20.54 km)	35°59′51″N 079°57′36″W	757 ft (231 m)	36°06′42″N 080°03′42″W	950 ft (290 m)	2.8%	West Fork Deep River, a 3rd order tributary, rises in Kernersville, North Carolina on the Reedy Fork divide. West Fork than flows southeast to meet the East Fork Deep River to form the Deep River in High Point Lake.
East Fork Deep River, left bank	21.67 square miles (56.1 km^{2})	28.30 cu ft/s (0.801 m^{3}/s)	9.25 mi (14.89 km)	36°01′13″N 079°56′24″W	757 ft (231 m)	36°05′54″N 079°59′42″W	935 ft (285 m)	1.9%	East Fork Deep River, a 3rd order tributary, rises about 3 miles northwest of Greensboro, North Carolina on the Reedy Fork divide. East Fork then flows southeast to meet the West Fork to form the Deep River in High Point Lake.
