= Buffalo Creek (Deep River tributary) =

Stream in North Carolina, US

Buffalo Creek Tributary to Deep River
- Location of Buffalo Creek mouth Buffalo Creek (Deep River tributary) (the United States)

Location
- Country: United States
- State: North Carolina
- County: Moore

Physical characteristics
- Source: Suck Creek divide
  - location: Pond about 0.5 miles northeast of Zion Grove, North Carolina
  - coordinates: 35°22′16″N 079°33′38″W
  - elevation: 615 ft (187 m)
- Mouth: Deep River
  - location: about 0.5 miles southeast of High Falls, North Carolina
  - coordinates: 35°28′39″N 079°30′20″W
  - elevation: 265 ft (81 m)
- Length: 12.73 mi (20.49 km)
- Basin size: 21.80 square miles (56.5 km^{2})
- Discharge
  - location: Deep River
  - average: 21.8 cu ft/s (0.62 m^{3}/s) at mouth with Deep River

Basin features
- Progression: Deep River → Cape Fear River → Atlantic Ocean
- River system: Deep River
- Tributaries
  - left: Meadow Creek
  - right: Gold Mine Branch
- Bridges: NC 24-27, Plank Road, Ritter Road, NC 22

Buffalo Creek is a 12.73 mi (20.49 km) long 3rd order tributary to the Deep River in Moore County, North Carolina.

== Course ==
Buffalo Creek rises in a pond about 0.5 miles northeast of Zion Grove, North Carolina in Moore County and then flows north to join the Deep River about 0.5 miles southeast of High Falls, North Carolina.

== Watershed ==
Buffalo Creek drains 21.80 square miles (56.5 km^{2}) of area, receives about 48.1 in/year of precipitation, and has a wetness index of 423.53 and is about 65% forested.

== See also ==
- List of rivers of North Carolina
