= Line Creek (Deep River tributary) =

Stream in North Carolina, USA

Line Creek Tributary to Deep River
- Location of Line Creek mouth Line Creek (Deep River tributary) (the United States)

Location
- Country: United States
- State: North Carolina
- County: Moore; Chatham
- City: Carbonton

Physical characteristics
- Source: Indian Creek divide
  - location: Pond about 3 miles northwest of Carbonton, North Carolina
  - coordinates: 35°31′49″N 079°23′06″W
  - elevation: 418 ft (127 m)
- Mouth: Deep River
  - location: Carbonton, North Carolina
  - coordinates: 35°31′05″N 079°21′01″W
  - elevation: 225 ft (69 m)
- Length: 2.93 mi (4.72 km)
- Basin size: 2.20 square miles (5.7 km^{2})
- Discharge
  - location: Deep River
  - average: 2.76 cu ft/s (0.078 m^{3}/s) at mouth with Deep River

Basin features
- Progression: Rocky River → Deep River → Cape Fear River → Atlantic Ocean
- River system: Deep River
- Tributaries
  - left: unnamed tributaries
  - right: unnamed tributaries
- Bridges: Lakewood Falls Road (x2), Alston House Road

Line Creek is a 2.93 mi (4.72 km) long 1st order tributary to the Deep River in Chatham County, North Carolina. This stream straddles the Moore-Chatham County line in its lower reach, hence the name.

== Course ==
Line Creek rises in a pond about 3 miles northwest of Carbonton, North Carolina in Chatham County and then flows easterly to the Moore-Chatham County line to join the Deep River at Carbonton.

== Watershed ==
Line Creek drains 2.20 square miles (5.7 km^{2}) of area, receives about 47.7 in/year of precipitation, and has a wetness index of 392.93 and is about 64% forested.

== See also ==
- List of rivers of North Carolina
