= Georges Creek (Deep River tributary) =

Stream in North Carolina, USA

Georges Creek Tributary to Deep River
- Location of Georges Creek mouth Georges Creek (Deep River tributary) (the United States)

Location
- Country: United States
- State: North Carolina
- County: Chatham

Physical characteristics
- Source: Pond on the Bear Creek divide
  - location: about 2 miles northeast of Goldston, North Carolina
  - coordinates: 35°37′45″N 079°16′38″W
  - elevation: 445 ft (136 m)
- Mouth: Deep River
  - location: about 0.5 miles east of Farmville, North Carolina
  - coordinates: 35°34′01″N 079°12′00″W
  - elevation: 200 ft (61 m)
- Length: 12.88 mi (20.73 km)
- Basin size: 12.88 square miles (33.4 km^{2})
- Discharge
  - location: Deep River
  - average: 15.15 cu ft/s (0.429 m^{3}/s) at mouth with Deep River

Basin features
- Progression: Rocky River → Deep River → Cape Fear River → Atlantic Ocean
- River system: Deep River
- Tributaries
  - left: Rocky Branch
  - right: unnamed tributaries
- Bridges: Cole Thomas Road, Henry Oldham Road, Rosser Road, Everett Dowdy Road

Georges Creek is a 12.88 mi (20.73 km) long 3rd order tributary to the Deep River in Chatham County, North Carolina.

== Course ==
Georges Creek rises about 2 miles northeast of Goldston, North Carolina in Chatham County and then flows southeast to the Deep River about 0.5 miles east of Farmville, North Carolina.

== Watershed ==
Georges Creek drains 12.88 square miles (33.4 km^{2}) of area, receives about 47.5 in/year of precipitation, and has a wetness index of 426.24 and is about 65% forested.

== See also ==
- List of rivers of North Carolina
