= Smiths Creek (Deep River tributary) =

Stream in North Carolina, USA

Smiths Creek Tributary to Deep River
- Location of Smiths Creek mouth Smiths Creek (Deep River tributary) (the United States)

Location
- Country: United States
- State: North Carolina
- County: Lee

Physical characteristics
- Source: Little Pocket Creek divide
  - location: about 1 mile southwest of Ebenezer Church
  - coordinates: 35°29′09″N 079°18′53″W
  - elevation: 337 ft (103 m)
- Mouth: Deep River
  - location: about 1.5 miles southwest of Gulf, North Carolina
  - coordinates: 35°31′57″N 079°18′40″W
  - elevation: 210 ft (64 m)
- Length: 4.18 mi (6.73 km)
- Basin size: 3.56 square miles (9.2 km^{2})
- Discharge
  - location: Deep River
  - average: 4.37 cu ft/s (0.124 m^{3}/s) at mouth with Deep River

Basin features
- Progression: Deep River → Cape Fear River → Atlantic Ocean
- River system: Deep River
- Tributaries
  - left: unnamed tributaries
  - right: unnamed tributaries
- Bridges: NC 42

Smiths Creek is a 4.18 mi (6.73 km) long 2nd order tributary to the Deep River in Lee County, North Carolina.

== Variant names ==
According to the Geographic Names Information System, it has also been known historically as:

- Smith Creek

== Course ==
Smiths Creek rises about 1 mile southwest of Ebenezer Church in Lee County, North Carolina and then flows north to join the Deep River about 1.5 miles southwest of Gulf, North Carolina.

== Watershed ==
Smiths Creek drains 3.56 square miles (9.2 km^{2}) of area, receives about 47.7 in/year of precipitation, and has a wetness index of 384.73 and is about 76% forested.
