= Lick Creek (Deep River tributary) =

Stream in North Carolina, USA

Lick Creek Tributary to Deep River
- Location of Lick Creek mouth Lick Creek (Deep River tributary) (the United States)

Location
- Country: United States
- State: North Carolina
- County: Moore

Physical characteristics
- Source: Unnamed tributary to Deep River divide
  - location: Pond about 1 mile southwest of Glendon, North Carolina
  - coordinates: 35°28′27″N 079°26′26″W
  - elevation: 385 ft (117 m)
- Mouth: Deep River
  - location: about 1 mile southeast of Glendon, North Carolina
  - coordinates: 35°28′24″N 079°23′30″W
  - elevation: 228 ft (69 m)
- Length: 4.53 mi (7.29 km)
- Basin size: 2.35 square miles (6.1 km^{2})
- Discharge
  - location: Deep River
  - average: 2.95 cu ft/s (0.084 m^{3}/s) at mouth with Deep River

Basin features
- Progression: Deep River → Cape Fear River → Atlantic Ocean
- River system: Deep River
- Tributaries
  - left: unnamed tributaries
  - right: unnamed tributaries
- Bridges: Glendon-Carthage Road

Lick Creek is a 4.53 mi (7.29 km) long 1st order tributary to the Deep River in Moore County, North Carolina.

== Course ==
Lick Creek rises in a pond about 1 mile southwest of Glendon in Moore County and then flows easterly to join the Deep River about 1 mile southeast of Glendon, North Carolina.

== Watershed ==
Lick Creek drains 2.35 square miles (6.1 km^{2}) of area, receives about 48.0 in/year of precipitation, and has a wetness index of 400.17 and is about 55% forested.

== See also ==
- List of rivers of North Carolina
