= Deep River Camelback Truss Bridge =

- U.S. National Register of Historic Places
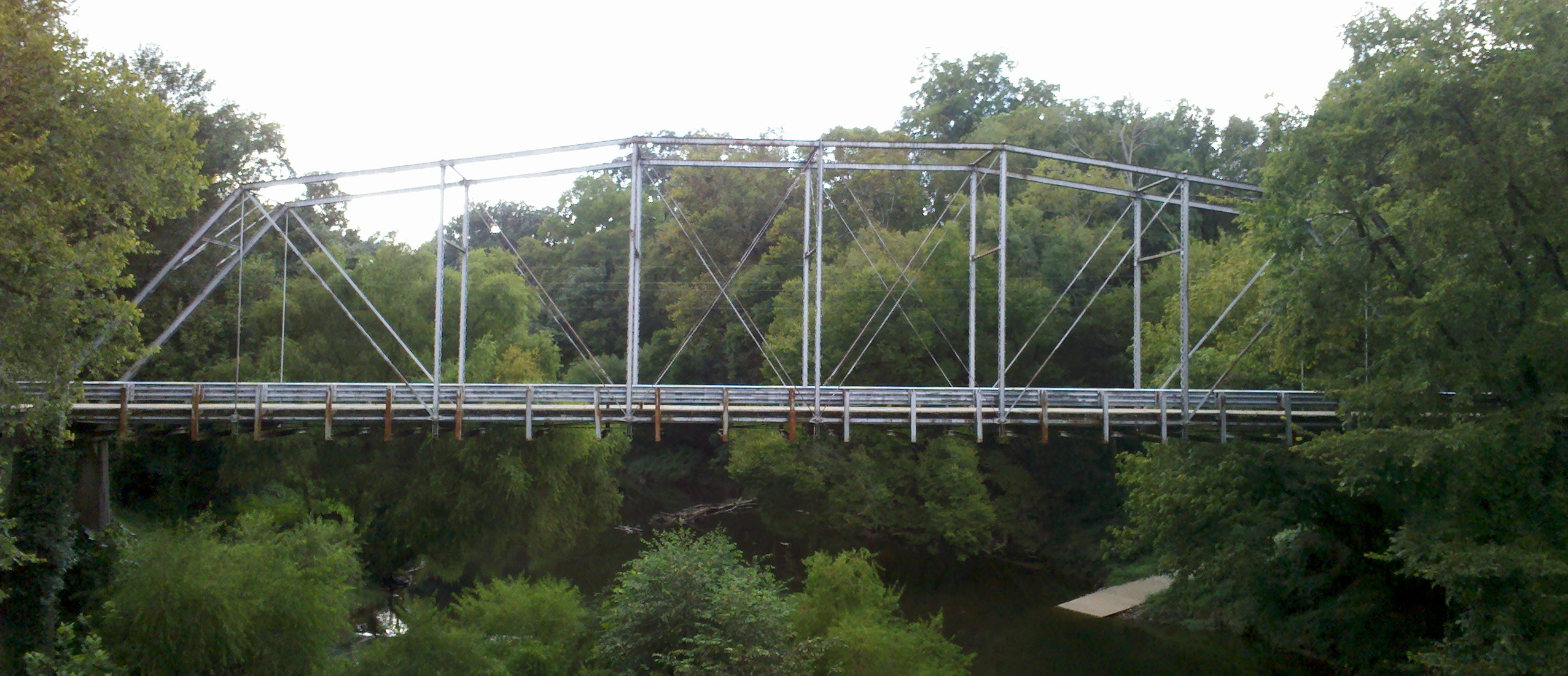
- Deep River Camelback Bridge in August 2012

- Location within North Carolina Location within the United States
- Nearest city: Cumnock-Gulf, North Carolina
- Coordinates: 35°34′13″N 79°14′28″W
- Area: less than one acre
- Built: about 1901
- Architectural style: Camelback Truss
- NRHP reference No.: 95000696
- Added to NRHP: June 9, 1995

The Deep River Camelback Truss Bridge is a steel camelback truss resting on stone and concrete piers, with a macadam road surface covering a plank deck.

It spans the Deep River in North Carolina, United States between the hamlets of Gulf in Chatham County and Cumnock in Lee County in a quiet rural setting amid woods and farmlands on both sides of the river. It was originally constructed in 1901. The bridge is listed on the National Register of Historic Places. The bridge is open to pedestrian traffic only. Vehicles may use a replacement bridge located about a hundred yards east of the historic structure.

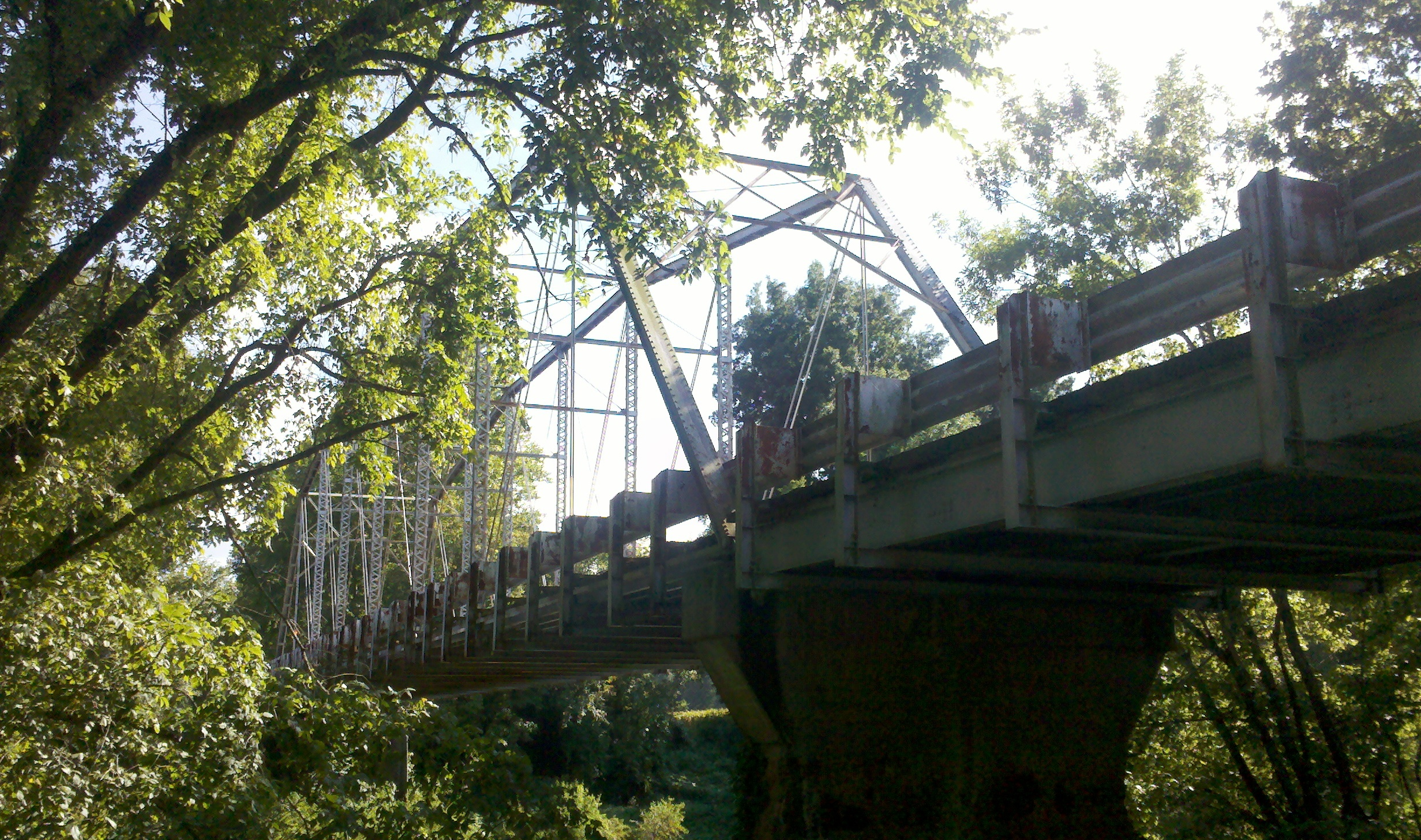
Camelback bridge, view from the south end, Aug. 2012

== Location ==
The bridge is located within Deep River Park, which also includes picnic facilities and a boat ramp. It is a popular spot for geocaching. To reach from US-421 at the Deep River, go southeast and take a left onto Cumnock Road. Follow the road to the county line. As you cross the river on the new bridge, look to your left for a view of the truss bridge. Continue 0.1 mile north to an intersection with Everett Dowdy Road, and the park entrance, on your left.

== History ==
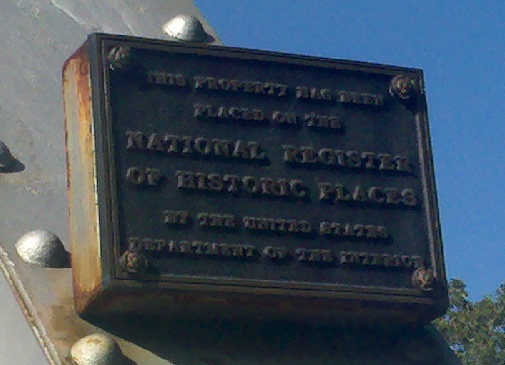
Deep River Camelback Bridge Aug 2012

The Deep River Camelback Truss Bridge, identified as Truss Bridge #155 by the North Carolina Department of Transportation, spans the Deep River on SR 2153 north of the community of Cumnock in northern Lee County, providing access between Cumnock and the Gulf community in southern Chatham County. This section along the Deep River was the site of coal, iron, and copper mining operations and iron foundries through much of the nineteenth century. The present bridge was originally erected in 1901 as part of a multi- span bridge over the Cape Fear River at Lillington, about thirty miles to the southeast in Neal's Creek Township, Harnett County. After a span of the bridge collapsed in December 1930, the remaining spans were disassembled in order for a new bridge to be constructed at the site in 1931, and in 1932 one of the salvaged spans was re-erected at the present site over the Deep River to replace a wooden covered bridge that had burned about 1929. Bridges have served this location at least as early as 1833. A nineteenth-century fieldstone pier supports the present bridge on the north end may date to an earlier bridge at the site, called Evans Bridge after Peter Evans, whose plantation, Egypt, lay on the south bank of the river.

In 1979 the bridge was one of thirty-five bridges (including eight camelback trusses) formally determined eligible for the National Register as important examples of metal truss engineering technology in the state from 1880 to 1935, and for associations with transportation improvements in the state in the early twentieth century. Today Truss Bridge #155 is one of only four camelback trusses surviving in North Carolina. In 1992 the Department of Transportation completed a new concrete bridge spanning the Deep River east of Truss Bridge #155. Ownership of the older bridge was transferred to the Deep River Park Association, and it will be preserved in place as part of the group's Rails-Trails route under development.

== Design ==
Truss Bridge #155 is a camelback truss bridge, 160 feet long and divided into eight panels, with the two trusses joined by a system of portal, lateral, and sway braces. The truss system is pin-joined. The trusses have die-punched eyes on the bottom chords but also forge-welded double clevises on all tie bars. The bridge is supported by coarse stone (north side) and concrete piers, with a macadam covered plank road surface. The remains of the earthen base and timber support for the central pier of an earlier bridge may be seen below the bridge.
