= Millstone Creek (Deep River tributary) =

Stream in North Carolina, USA

Millstone Creek Tributary to Deep River
- Location of Millstone Creek mouth Millstone Creek (Deep River tributary) (the United States)

Location
- Country: United States
- State: North Carolina
- County: Randolph

Physical characteristics
- Source: Brush Creek divide
  - location: about 0.1 miles south of Browns Crossroads, North Carolina
  - coordinates: 35°43′43″N 079°35′53″W
  - elevation: 625 ft (191 m)
- Mouth: Deep River
  - location: about 2 miles south of Parks Crossroads, North Carolina
  - coordinates: 35°40′39″N 079°37′40″W
  - elevation: 405 ft (123 m)
- Length: 7.08 mi (11.39 km)
- Basin size: 10.02 square miles (26.0 km^{2})
- Discharge
  - location: Deep River
  - average: 12.34 cu ft/s (0.349 m^{3}/s) at mouth with Deep River

Basin features
- Progression: Rocky River → Deep River → Cape Fear River → Atlantic Ocean
- River system: Deep River
- Tributaries
  - left: unnamed tributaries
  - right: unnamed tributaries
- Bridges: Parks Crossroads Church Road, Foushee Road, Lee Layne Road, Old Siler City Road, NC 22

Millstone Creek is a 7.08 mi (11.39 km) long 3rd order tributary to the Deep River in Randolph, North Carolina.

== Course ==
Millstone Creek rises on the Brush Creek divide about 0.1 miles south of Browns Crossroads in Randolph County, North Carolina and then flows southwesterly to join the Deep River about 2 miles southwest of Parks Crossroads, North Carolina.

== Watershed ==
Millstone Creek drains 10.02 square miles (26.0 km^{2}) of area, receives about 47.3 in/year of precipitation, and has a wetness index of 389.06 and is about 37% forested.

== See also ==
- List of rivers of North Carolina
