= Pocket Creek (Deep River tributary) =

Stream in North Carolina, USA

Pocket Creek Tributary to Deep River
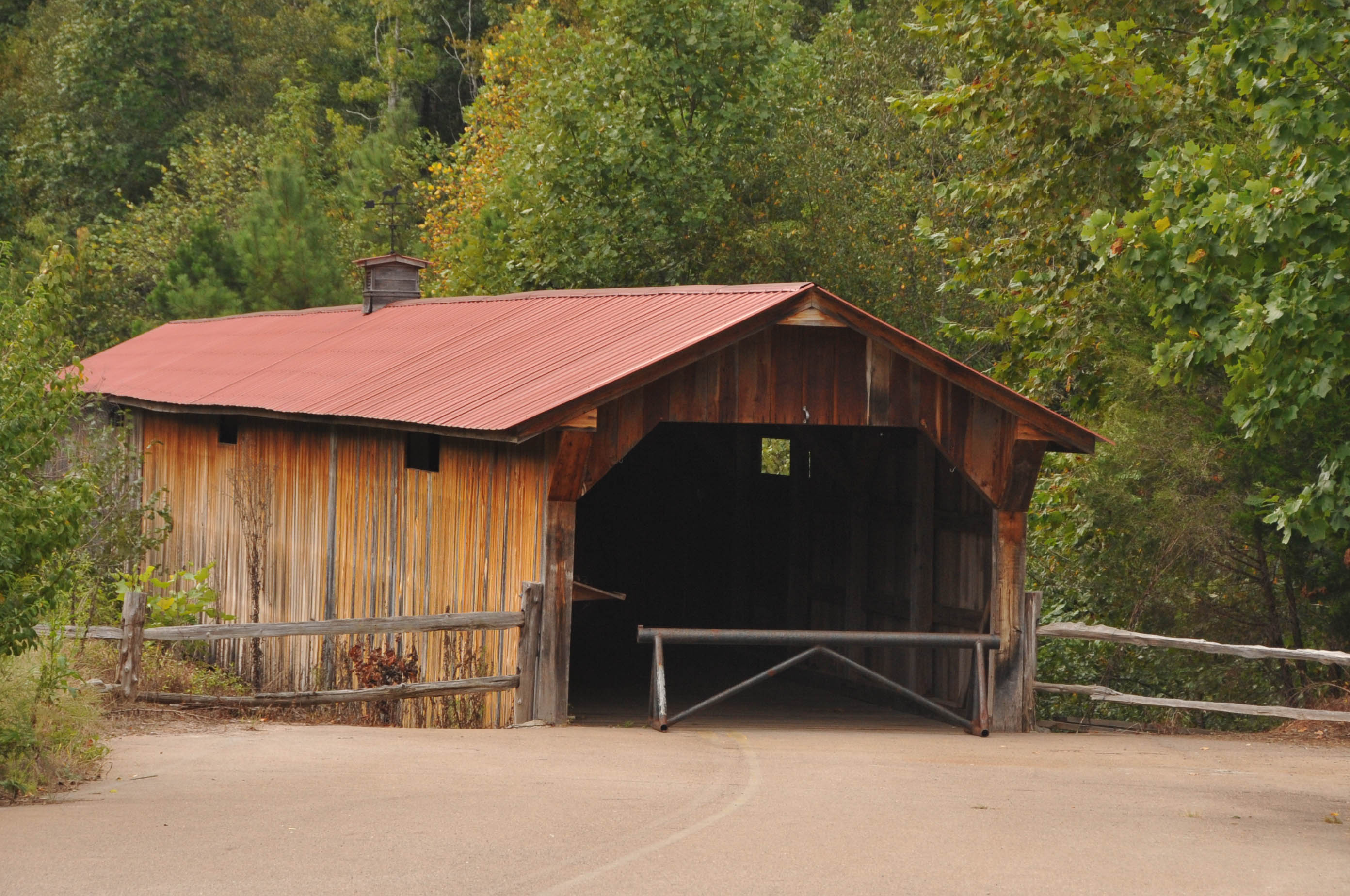
- GILLIAM PARK COVERED BRIDGE, LEE COUNTY, NC

- Location of Pocket Creek mouth Pocket Creek (Deep River tributary) (the United States)

Location
- Country: United States
- State: North Carolina
- County: Lee

Physical characteristics
- Source: divide between Pocket Creek, Herds Creek, and Little Crane Creek
  - location: White Hill, North Carolina
  - coordinates: 35°23′11″N 079°16′46″W
  - elevation: 475 ft (145 m)
- Mouth: Deep River
  - location: about 1.5 miles south of Gulf, North Carolina
  - coordinates: 35°32′03″N 079°16′49″W
  - elevation: 208 ft (63 m)
- Length: 16.44 mi (26.46 km)
- Basin size: 37.65 square miles (97.5 km^{2})
- Discharge
  - location: Deep River
  - average: 42.61 cu ft/s (1.207 m^{3}/s) at mouth with Deep River

Basin features
- Progression: Deep River → Cape Fear River → Atlantic Ocean
- River system: Deep River
- Tributaries
  - left: Dry Fork; Little Pocket Creek
  - right: Raccoon Creek
- Bridges: Villanow Drive, Chris Cole Road, Center Church Road, Covered Bridge Lane, Henley Road, Steel Bridge Road, Carbonton Road (NC 42)

Pocket Creek is a 16.44 mi (26.46 km) long 3rd order tributary to the Deep River in Lee County, North Carolina. The longest covered bridge (Gilliam Park Covered Bridge) in North Carolina crosses this creek.

== Course ==
Pocket Creek rises in a pond in White Hill, North Carolina and then flows north to join the Deep River about 1.5 miles south of Gulf, North Carolina.

== Watershed ==
Pocket Creek drains 37.65 square miles (97.5 km^{2}) of area, receives about 47.9 in/year of precipitation, has a wetness index of 390.19 and is about 63% forested.

== See also ==
- List of rivers of North Carolina
