= Reed Creek (Deep River tributary) =

Stream in North Carolina, USA

Reed Creek Tributary to Deep River
- Location of Reed Creek mouth Reed Creek (Deep River tributary) (the United States)

Location
- Country: United States
- State: North Carolina
- County: Randolph

Physical characteristics
- Source: Brush Creek and Mt Pleasant Creek divides
  - location: about 1.5 miles west of Staley, North Carolina
  - coordinates: 35°47′16″N 079°35′29″W
  - elevation: 710 ft (220 m)
- Mouth: Deep River
  - location: about 1 mile south of Ramseur, North Carolina
  - coordinates: 35°42′28″N 079°38′45″W
  - elevation: 415 ft (126 m)
- Length: 8.63 mi (13.89 km)
- Basin size: 10.12 square miles (26.2 km^{2})
- Discharge
  - location: Deep River
  - average: 12.43 cu ft/s (0.352 m^{3}/s) at mouth with Deep River

Basin features
- Progression: Rocky River → Deep River → Cape Fear River → Atlantic Ocean
- River system: Deep River
- Tributaries
  - left: unnamed tributaries
  - right: unnamed tributaries
- Bridges: Wright Country Road, US 64, Lee Layne Road, Reed Creek Road, Foushee Road, NC 22

Reed Creek is a 8.63 mi (13.89 km) long 3rd order tributary to the Deep River in Randolph County, North Carolina.

== Course ==
Reed Creek rises about 1.5 miles west of Staley, North Carolina in Randolph County, North Carolina and then flows southwesterly to join the Deep River about 1 mile south of Ramseur, North Carolina.

== Watershed ==
Reed Creek drains 10.12 square miles (26.2 km^{2}) of area, receives about 47.2 in/year of precipitation, and has a wetness index of 404.77 and is about 38% forested.

== See also ==
- List of rivers of North Carolina
