= Fork Creek (Deep River tributary) =

Stream in North Carolina, USA

Fork Creek Tributary to Deep River
- Location of Fork Creek mouth Fork Creek (Deep River tributary) (the United States)

Location
- Country: United States
- State: North Carolina
- County: Randolph

Physical characteristics
- Source: Bachelor Creek divide
  - location: about 1 mile northeast of Michfield, North Carolina
  - coordinates: 35°35′26″N 079°46′08″W
  - elevation: 665 ft (203 m)
- Mouth: Deep River
  - location: about 3 miles east-northeast of Jugtown, North Carolina
  - coordinates: 35°31′04″N 079°35′57″W
  - elevation: 326 ft (99 m)
- Length: 15.46 mi (24.88 km)
- Basin size: 48.29 square miles (125.1 km^{2})
- Discharge
  - location: Deep River
  - average: 53.98 cu ft/s (1.529 m^{3}/s) at mouth with Deep River

Basin features
- Progression: Deep River → Cape Fear River → Atlantic Ocean
- River system: Deep River
- Tributaries
  - left: Little Creek
  - right: Lambert Creek; Meadow Branch; Reedy Creek
- Bridges: Bachelor Creek Road, Fork Creek Mill Road, Union Grove Church Road, Erect Road, Riverside Road

Fork Creek is a 15.46 mi (24.88 km) long 4th order tributary to the Deep River in Randolph County, North Carolina.

== Variant names ==
According to the Geographic Names Information System, it has also been known historically as:

- Crooked Creek
- Pork Creek

== Course ==
Fork Creek rises about 1 mile northeast of Michfield, North Carolina in Randolph County and then flows southeasterly to join the Deep River about 3 miles east-northeast of Jugtown.

== Watershed ==
Fork Creek drains 48.29 square miles (125.1 km^{2}) of area, receives about 47.3 in/year of precipitation, and has a wetness index of 393.07 and is about 54% forested.

== See also ==
- List of rivers of North Carolina
