= Richland Creek (Deep River tributary, Randolph) =

Stream in North Carolina, USA

Richland Creek Tributary to Deep River
- Location of Richland Creek mouth Richland Creek (Deep River tributary, Randolph) (the United States)

Location
- Country: United States
- State: North Carolina
- County: Randolph

Physical characteristics
- Source: confluence of North and South Prong Richland Creek
  - location: about 0.25 miles northeast of Harveys Mountain
  - coordinates: 35°38′39″N 079°46′39″W
  - elevation: 573 ft (175 m)
- Mouth: Deep River
  - location: about 1 mile northwest of Cheeks, North Carolina
  - coordinates: 35°36′34″N 079°36′26″W
  - elevation: 351 ft (107 m)
- Length: 15.00 mi (24.14 km)
- Basin size: 66.06 square miles (171.1 km^{2})
- Discharge
  - location: Deep River
  - average: 73.18 cu ft/s (2.072 m^{3}/s) at mouth with Deep River

Basin features
- Progression: Deep River → Cape Fear River → Atlantic Ocean
- River system: Deep River
- Tributaries
  - left: North Prong; Tantrough Branch; Vestal Creek; Squirrel Creek
  - right: South Prong; Panther Creek; Bachelor Creek
- Bridges: Old Cox Road, Old Humble Mill Road, Fairview Farm Road, Old NC 13, Kemp Mill Road, Little Beane Store Road, Picketts Mill Road, Erect Road, Riverside Road

Richland Creek is a 15.00 mi (24.14 km) long 4th order tributary to the Deep River in Randolph County, North Carolina.

== Course ==
Richland Creek is formed at the confluence of North and South Prong about 0.25 miles northeast of Harveys Mountain in Randolph County, North Carolina and then flows southeasterly to join the Deep River about 1 mile northwest of Cheeks, North Carolina.

== Watershed ==
Richland Creek drains 66.06 square miles (171.1 km^{2}) of area, receives about 47.1 in/year of precipitation, and has a wetness index of 387.93 and is about 58% forested.

== See also ==
- List of rivers of North Carolina
