= Rocky Branch (Deep River tributary) =

Stream in North Carolina, USA

Rocky Branch Tributary to Deep River
- Location of Rocky Branch mouth Rocky Branch (Deep River tributary) (the United States)

Location
- Country: United States
- State: North Carolina
- County: Chatham

Physical characteristics
- Source: Turkey Creek divide
  - location: pond about 2 miles south of Pittsboro, North Carolina
  - coordinates: 35°40′25″N 079°09′36″W
  - elevation: 455 ft (139 m)
- Mouth: Deep River
  - location: about 1 mile northwest of Blacknel, North Carolina
  - coordinates: 35°37′26″N 079°08′07″W
  - elevation: 188 ft (57 m)
- Length: 4.99 mi (8.03 km)
- Basin size: 5.02 square miles (13.0 km^{2})
- Discharge
  - location: Deep River
  - average: 6.19 cu ft/s (0.175 m^{3}/s) at mouth with Deep River

Basin features
- Progression: Deep River → Cape Fear River → Atlantic Ocean
- River system: Deep River
- Tributaries
  - left: unnamed tributaries
  - right: unnamed tributaries
- Bridges: Charlie Brooks Road, Mt. View Church Road, E Gargis Road

Rocky Branch is a 4.99 mi (8.03 km) long 2nd order tributary to the Deep River in Chatham County, North Carolina.

== Course ==
Rocky Branch rises about 2 miles south of Pittsboro, North Carolina in Chatham County and then flows south to the Deep River about 1 mile northwest of Blacknel, North Carolina.

== Watershed ==
Rocky Branch drains 5.02 square miles (13.0 km^{2}) of area, receives about 47.5 in/year of precipitation, and has a wetness index of 414.55 and is about 58% forested.

== See also ==
- List of rivers of North Carolina
