= Cedar Creek (Deep River tributary, Chatham) =

Stream in North Carolina, USA

Cedar Creek Tributary to Deep River
- Location of Cedar Creek mouth Cedar Creek (Deep River tributary, Chatham) (the United States)

Location
- Country: United States
- State: North Carolina
- County: Chatham County

Physical characteristics
- Source: Bear Creek divide
  - location: about 0.5 miles east of Goldston, North Carolina
  - coordinates: 35°35′48″N 079°18′18″W
  - elevation: 390 ft (120 m)
- Mouth: Deep River
  - location: about 1 mile east-northeast of Gulf, North Carolina
  - coordinates: 35°34′04″N 079°14′41″W
  - elevation: 208 ft (63 m)
- Length: 5.41 mi (8.71 km)
- Basin size: 13.19 square miles (34.2 km^{2})
- Discharge
  - location: Deep River
  - average: 15.50 cu ft/s (0.439 m^{3}/s) at mouth with Deep River

Basin features
- Progression: Deep River → Cape Fear River → Atlantic Ocean
- River system: Deep River
- Tributaries
  - left: unnamed tributaries
  - right: unnamed tributaries
- Bridges: Henry Oldham Road, R Jordan Road

Cedar Creek is a 5.41 mi (8.71 km) long 3rd order tributary to the Deep River in Chatham County, North Carolina.

== Course ==
Cedar Creek rises about 1 mile east of Goldston, North Carolina and then flows southeast to the Deep River about 0.5 miles east-northeast of Gulf, North Carolina.

== Watershed ==
Cedar Creek drains 13.19 square miles (34.2 km^{2}) of area, receives about 47.5 in/year of precipitation, and has a wetness index of 435.12 and is about 66% forested.

== See also ==
- List of rivers of North Carolina
