= Muddy Creek (Deep River tributary) =

Stream in North Carolina, USA

Muddy Creek Tributary to Deep River
- Location of Muddy Creek mouth Muddy Creek (Deep River tributary) (the United States)

Location
- Country: United States
- State: North Carolina
- County: Randolph; Guilford
- City: Archdale

Physical characteristics
- Source: Mile Branch divide
  - location: east side of Archdale, North Carolina
  - coordinates: 35°55′08″N 079°59′54″W
  - elevation: 805 ft (245 m)
- Mouth: Deep River
  - location: about 1.5 miles northwest of Randleman, North Carolina
  - coordinates: 35°50′50″N 079°49′48″W
  - elevation: 682 ft (208 m)
- Length: 14.28 mi (22.98 km)
- Basin size: 26.45 square miles (68.5 km^{2})
- Discharge
  - location: Deep River
  - average: 29.94 cu ft/s (0.848 m^{3}/s) at mouth with Deep River

Basin features
- Progression: Deep River → Cape Fear River → Atlantic Ocean
- River system: Deep River
- Tributaries
  - left: Taylor Branch
  - right: Bob Branch
- Bridges: Archdale Boulevard, Meredith Drive, Trindale Road, English Farm Road, School Road, Archdale Road, I-85, Cheyenne Drive, S Main Street, Weant Road, Suits Road, I-74-US 311, Muddy Creek Road, Canter Road, Cedar Square Road, Branson Davis Road

Muddy Creek is a 14.28 mi (22.98 km) long 4th order tributary to the Deep River in Guilford and Randolph Counties, North Carolina.

== Course ==
Muddy Creek rises on the east side of Archdale, North Carolina in Guilford County and then flows southeast into Randolph County to join the Deep River about 1.5 miles northwest of Randleman, North Carolina.

== Watershed ==
Muddy Creek drains 26.45 square miles (68.5 km^{2}) of area, receives about 46.3 in/year of precipitation, and has a wetness index of 418.90 and is about 24% forested.
