= Broad Mouth Branch =

Stream in North Carolina, USA

Broad Mouth Branch Tributary to Deep River
- Location of Broad Mouth Branch mouth Broad Mouth Branch (the United States)

Location
- Country: United States
- State: North Carolina
- County: Randolph

Physical characteristics
- Source: Back Branch divide
  - location: Pond about 2.5 miles northeast of Coleridge, North Carolina
  - coordinates: 35°40′32″N 079°35′41″W
  - elevation: 605 ft (184 m)
- Mouth: Deep River
  - location: about 1.5 miles north of Coleridge, North Carolina
  - coordinates: 35°39′53″N 079°37′21″W
  - elevation: 399 ft (122 m)
- Length: 2.69 mi (4.33 km)
- Basin size: 2.15 square miles (5.6 km^{2})
- Discharge
  - location: Deep River
  - average: 2.80 cu ft/s (0.079 m^{3}/s) at mouth with Deep River

Basin features
- Progression: Rocky River → Deep River → Cape Fear River → Atlantic Ocean
- River system: Deep River
- Tributaries
  - left: unnamed tributaries
  - right: unnamed tributaries
- Bridges: Troy Caverness Road, NC 22

Broad Mouth Branch is a 2.69 mi (4.33 km) long 1st order tributary to the Deep River in Randolph, North Carolina. This is the only stream with this name in the United States according to the US Geological Survey.

== Course ==
Broad Mouth Branch rises in a pond on the Back Branch divide about 2.5 miles northeast of Coleridge, North Carolina in Randolph County, North Carolina and then flows southwesterly to join the Deep River about 1 mile north of Coleridge, North Carolina.

== Watershed ==
Broad Mouth Branch drains 2.15 square miles (5.6 km^{2}) of area, receives about 47.3 in/year of precipitation, and has a wetness index of 383.09 and is about 50% forested.

== See also ==
- List of rivers of North Carolina
