= Mill Creek (Deep River tributary) =

Stream in North Carolina, USA

Mill Creek Tributary to Deep River
- Location of Mill Creek mouth Mill Creek (Deep River tributary) (the United States)

Location
- Country: United States
- State: North Carolina
- County: Randolph

Physical characteristics
- Source: Gabriels Creek divide
  - location: Pond about 2 miles northwest of Fox Mountain
  - coordinates: 35°43′19″N 079°44′39″W
  - elevation: 685 ft (209 m)
- Mouth: Deep River
  - location: about 2 miles southwest of Parks Crossroads, North Carolina
  - coordinates: 35°41′04″N 079°38′03″W
  - elevation: 407 ft (124 m)
- Length: 10.02 mi (16.13 km)
- Basin size: 17.95 square miles (46.5 km^{2})
- Discharge
  - location: Deep River
  - average: 20.97 cu ft/s (0.594 m^{3}/s) at mouth with Deep River

Basin features
- Progression: Deep River → Cape Fear River → Atlantic Ocean
- River system: Deep River
- Tributaries
  - left: unnamed tributaries
  - right: Sandy Run
- Bridges: Iron Mountain Road, Iron Mountain View Road, Fox Fire Road, Grantville Lane, Young Road, Mill Creek Road

Mill Creek is a 10.02 mi (16.13 km) long 3rd order tributary to the Deep River in Randolph County, North Carolina.

== Course ==
Mill Creek rises in a pond about 2 miles northwest of Fox Mountain in Randolph County, North Carolina and then flows southwesterly to join the Deep River about 2 miles southwest of Parks Crossroads, North Carolina.

== Watershed ==
Mill Creek drains 17.95 square miles (46.5 km^{2}) of area, receives about 47.3 in/year of precipitation, and has a wetness index of 406.69 and is about 48% forested.
