= Bush Creek (Deep River tributary) =

Stream in North Carolina, USA

Bush Creek Tributary to Deep River
- Location of Bush Creek mouth Bush Creek (Deep River tributary) (the United States)

Location
- Country: United States
- State: North Carolina
- County: Randolph

Physical characteristics
- Source: Little Polecat Creek divide
  - location: Pond about 0.5 miles southwest of Lineberry, North Carolina
  - coordinates: 35°50′38″N 079°42′56″W
  - elevation: 805 ft (245 m)
- Mouth: Deep River
  - location: Franklinville, North Carolina
  - coordinates: 35°44′44″N 079°42′22″W
  - elevation: 438 ft (134 m)
- Length: 7.97 mi (12.83 km)
- Basin size: 13.41 square miles (34.7 km^{2})
- Discharge
  - location: Deep River
  - average: 13.47 cu ft/s (0.381 m^{3}/s) at mouth with Deep River

Basin features
- Progression: Rocky River → Deep River → Cape Fear River → Atlantic Ocean
- River system: Deep River
- Tributaries
  - left: unnamed tributaries
  - right: unnamed tributaries
- Bridges: Emerald Farm Road, Plum Tree Road, Old Liberty Road, Walker Store Road, Carl Allred Road, Cedar Falls Road

Bush Creek is a 7.97 mi (12.83 km) long 3rd order tributary to the Deep River in Randolph County, North Carolina.

== Course ==
Bush Creek rises in a pond about 0.5 miles southwest of Lineberry in Randolph County, North Carolina and then flows south to join the Deep River in Franklinville, North Carolina.

== Watershed ==
Bush Creek drains 13.41 square miles (34.7 km^{2}) of area, receives about 46.8 in/year of precipitation, and has a wetness index of 387.13 and is about 53% forested.

== See also ==
- List of rivers of North Carolina
