= Flat Creek (Deep River tributary) =

Stream in North Carolina, USA

Flat Creek Tributary to Deep River
- Location of Flat Creek mouth Flat Creek (Deep River tributary) (the United States)

Location
- Country: United States
- State: North Carolina
- County: Randolph; Chatham

Physical characteristics
- Source: Little Brush Creek divide
  - location: Pond about 4 miles northwest of Harpers Crossroads, North Carolina
  - coordinates: 35°32′49″N 079°30′38″W
  - elevation: 535 ft (163 m)
- Mouth: Deep River
  - location: about 2 miles southwest of Bennett, North Carolina
  - coordinates: 35°32′49″N 079°35′09″W
  - elevation: 329 ft (100 m)
- Length: 9.07 mi (14.60 km)
- Basin size: 14.24 square miles (36.9 km^{2})
- Discharge
  - location: Deep River
  - average: 16.87 cu ft/s (0.478 m^{3}/s) at mouth with Deep River

Basin features
- Progression: Rocky River → Deep River → Cape Fear River → Atlantic Ocean
- River system: Deep River
- Tributaries
  - left: unnamed tributaries
  - right: unnamed tributaries
- Bridges: Bill Lambert Road, Bennett Flatwoods Road, Bennett-Siler City Road, NC 42, Pleasant Grove Church Road, Flat Creek Road

Flat Creek is a 9.07 mi (14.60 km) long 2nd order tributary to the Deep River in Randolph and Chatham Counties, North Carolina.

== Course ==
Flat Creek rises about 4 miles northwest of Harpers Crossroads, North Carolina in Chatham County and then flows southwesterly into Randolph County to join the Deep River about 2 miles southwest of Bennett, North Carolina.

== Watershed ==
Flat Creek drains 14.24 square miles (36.9 km^{2}) of area, receives about 47.5 in/year of precipitation, and has a wetness index of 427.78 and is about 52% forested.

== See also ==
- List of rivers of North Carolina
