= Patterson Creek (Deep River tributary) =

Stream in North Carolina, USA

Patterson Creek Tributary to Deep River
- Location of Patterson Creek mouth Patterson Creek (Deep River tributary) (the United States)

Location
- Country: United States
- State: North Carolina
- County: Lee

Physical characteristics
- Source: divide of Persimmon Creek and Raccoon Creek
  - location: pond about 1 mile west of Sanford, North Carolina
  - coordinates: 35°27′57″N 079°13′32″W
  - elevation: 425 ft (130 m)
- Mouth: Deep River
  - location: about 1.5 miles southeast of Gulf, North Carolina
  - coordinates: 35°32′34″N 079°15′21″W
  - elevation: 208 ft (63 m)
- Length: 7.72 mi (12.42 km)
- Basin size: 7.22 square miles (18.7 km^{2})
- Discharge
  - location: Deep River
  - average: 8.64 cu ft/s (0.245 m^{3}/s) at mouth with Deep River

Basin features
- Progression: Deep River → Cape Fear River → Atlantic Ocean
- River system: Deep River
- Tributaries
  - left: unnamed tributaries
  - right: unnamed tributaries
- Bridges: NC 42, Royal Pines Drive, Carbonton Drive, Petty Road

Patterson Creek is a 7.72 mi (12.42 km) long 2nd order tributary to the Deep River in Lee County, North Carolina.

== Course ==
Patterson Creek rises in a pond about 1 mile west of Sanford, North Carolina and then flows north to the Deep River about 1.5 miles southeast of Gulf, North Carolina.

== Watershed ==
Patterson Creek drains 7.22 square miles (18.7 km^{2}) of area, receives about 47.7 in/year of precipitation, and has a wetness index of 383.71 and is about 72% forested.

== See also ==
- List of rivers of North Carolina
