= Back Branch (Deep River tributary) =

Stream in North Carolina, USA

Back Branch Tributary to Deep River
- Location of Back Branch mouth Back Branch (Deep River tributary) (the United States)

Location
- Country: United States
- State: North Carolina
- County: Randolph

Physical characteristics
- Source: Broad Mouth Branch divide
  - location: about 2 miles northeast of Coleridge, North Carolina
  - coordinates: 35°40′45″N 079°35′27″W
  - elevation: 655 ft (200 m)
- Mouth: Deep River
  - location: about 0.25 miles north of Coleridge, North Carolina
  - coordinates: 35°38′52″N 079°37′14″W
  - elevation: 398 ft (121 m)
- Length: 4.54 mi (7.31 km)
- Basin size: 3.29 square miles (8.5 km^{2})
- Discharge
  - location: Deep River
  - average: 4.15 cu ft/s (0.118 m^{3}/s) at mouth with Deep River

Basin features
- Progression: Rocky River → Deep River → Cape Fear River → Atlantic Ocean
- River system: Deep River
- Tributaries
  - left: unnamed tributaries
  - right: unnamed tributaries
- Bridges: Willie Wright Road, Craven Branch Road, NC 22

Back Branch is a 3.29 mi (5.29 km) long 2nd order tributary to the Deep River in Randolph, North Carolina.

== Course ==
Back Branch rises on the Broad Mouth Branch divide about 2 miles northeast of Coleridge, North Carolina in Randolph County, North Carolina and then flows southwesterly to join the Deep River about 0.25 miles north of Coleridge, North Carolina.

== Watershed ==
Back Branch drains 3.29 square miles (8.5 km^{2}) of area, receives about 47.3 in/year of precipitation, and has a wetness index of 388.39 and is about 52% forested.

== See also ==
- List of rivers of North Carolina
