= Big Governors Creek =

Stream in North Carolina, USA

Big Governors Creek Tributary to Deep River
- Location of Big Governors Creek mouth Big Governors Creek (the United States)

Location
- Country: United States
- State: North Carolina
- County: Lee; Moore

Physical characteristics
- Source: Herds Creek divide
  - location: about 0.5 miles southwest of White Hill, North Carolina
  - coordinates: 35°22′15″N 079°18′25″W
  - elevation: 465 ft (142 m)
- Mouth: Deep River
  - location: about 1.5 miles southeast of Haw Branch, North Carolina
  - coordinates: 35°28′39″N 079°21′35″W
  - elevation: 226 ft (69 m)
- Length: 13.71 mi (22.06 km)
- Basin size: 40.87 square miles (105.9 km^{2})
- Discharge
  - location: Deep River
  - average: 46.70 cu ft/s (1.322 m^{3}/s) at mouth with Deep River

Basin features
- Progression: Deep River → Cape Fear River → Atlantic Ocean
- River system: Deep River
- Tributaries
  - left: McIntosh Creek; Crawley Creek
  - right: unnamed tributaries
- Bridges: Torchwood Road, Old River Road, Wadsworth Road, Underwood Road, Harrington Road

Big Governors Creek is a 13.71 mi (22.06 km) long 3rd order tributary to the Deep River in Lee and Moore Counties, North Carolina. This creek forms the Lee-Moore county line, in part and is the only stream of this name in the United States.

== Variant names ==
According to the Geographic Names Information System, it has also been known historically as:

- Governors Creek
- Millstone Creek

== Course ==
Big Governors Creek rises about 0.5 miles southwest of White Hill in Moore County and then flows northwest and north to join the Deep River about 1.5 miles southeast of Haw Branch, North Carolina.

== Watershed ==
Big Governors Creek drains 40.87 square miles (105.9 km^{2}) of area, receives about 48.4 in/year of precipitation, and has a wetness index of 380.16 and is about 65% forested.

== See also ==
- List of rivers of North Carolina
