= Hickory Creek (Deep River tributary) =

Stream in North Carolina, USA

Hickory Creek Tributary to Deep River
- Location of Hickory Creek mouth Hickory Creek (Deep River tributary) (the United States)

Location
- Country: United States
- State: North Carolina
- County: Guilford
- City: Greensboro

Physical characteristics
- Source: South Buffalo Creek divide
  - location: Greensboro, North Carolina
  - coordinates: 36°00′47″N 079°51′15″W
  - elevation: 805 ft (245 m)
- Mouth: Deep River
  - location: about 2 miles southeast of Freemans Mill, North Carolina
  - coordinates: 35°55′39″N 079°52′08″W
  - elevation: 655 ft (200 m)
- Length: 7.23 mi (11.64 km)
- Basin size: 20.49 square miles (53.1 km^{2})
- Discharge
  - location: Deep River
  - average: 22.94 cu ft/s (0.650 m^{3}/s) at mouth with Deep River

Basin features
- Progression: Rocky River → Deep River → Cape Fear River → Atlantic Ocean
- River system: Deep River
- Tributaries
  - left: unnamed tributaries
  - right: Reddicks Creek
- Bridges: I-73, US 29, I-85, Bishop Road, Kivett Drive, Burnetts Chapel Road, Wall Road

Hickory Creek is a 7.23 mi (11.64 km) long 3rd order tributary to the Deep River in Guilford County, North Carolina.

== Course ==
Hickory Creek rises at the south end of Greensboro, North Carolina in Guilford County and then takes a southerly course to join the Deep River about 2 miles southeast of Freeman Mill, North Carolina.

== Watershed ==
Hickory Creek drains 20.49 square miles (53.1 km^{2}) of area, receives about 45.8 in/year of precipitation, and has a wetness index of 404.36 and is about 35% forested.

== See also ==
- List of rivers of North Carolina
