= Polecat Creek (Deep River tributary) =

Stream in North Carolina, USA

Polecat Creek Tributary to Deep River
- Location of Polecat Creek mouth Polecat Creek (Deep River tributary) (the United States)

Location
- Country: United States
- State: North Carolina
- County: Randolph; Guilford
- City: Greensboro; Worthville

Physical characteristics
- Source: South Buffalo Creek divide
  - location: south side of Greensboro, North Carolina
  - coordinates: 35°59′46″N 079°48′28″W
  - elevation: 830 ft (250 m)
- Mouth: Deep River
  - location: Worthville, North Carolina
  - coordinates: 35°48′12″N 079°46′39″W
  - elevation: 582 ft (177 m)
- Length: 18.91 mi (30.43 km)
- Basin size: 56.27 square miles (145.7 km^{2})
- Discharge
  - location: Deep River
  - average: 62.63 cu ft/s (1.773 m^{3}/s) at mouth with Deep River

Basin features
- Progression: Rocky River → Deep River → Cape Fear River → Atlantic Ocean
- River system: Deep River
- Tributaries
  - left: Little Polecat Creek
  - right: unnamed tributaries
- Bridges: Brushy Fork Drive, Sutton Road, Randleman Road, E Steeple Chase Road, Davis Mill Road, NC 62, Branson Mill Road, Providence Church Road, Fred Lineberry Road, New Salem Road, Naomi Road, Creekridge Country Road

Polecat Creek is an 18.91 mi (30.43 km) long 4th order tributary to the Deep River in Guilford and Randolph Counties, North Carolina.

== Variant names ==
According to the Geographic Names Information System, it has also been known historically as:

- Polecat River

== Course ==
Polecat Creek rises on the south side of Greensboro, North Carolina in Guilford County and then flows south into Randolph County to join the Deep River in Worthville, North Carolina.

== Watershed ==
Polecat Creek drains 56.27 square miles (145.7 km^{2}) of area, receives about 46.5 in/year of precipitation, and has a wetness index of 414.85 and is about 46% forested.

== See also ==
- List of rivers of North Carolina
