= Bull Run (Deep River tributary) =

Stream in North Carolina, USA

Bull Run Tributary to Deep River
- Location of Bull Run mouth Bull Run (Deep River tributary) (the United States)

Location
- Country: United States
- State: North Carolina
- County: Guilford

Physical characteristics
- Source: Long Branch divide
  - location: pond about 1 mile west of Greensboro, North Carolina
  - coordinates: 36°03′14″N 079°54′40″W
  - elevation: 885 ft (270 m)
- Mouth: Deep River
  - location: about 0.1 miles southwest of Oakdale, North Carolina
  - coordinates: 35°58′47″N 079°55′42″W
  - elevation: 688 ft (210 m)
- Length: 6.04 mi (9.72 km)
- Basin size: 7.78 square miles (20.2 km^{2})
- Discharge
  - location: Deep River
  - average: 8.87 cu ft/s (0.251 m^{3}/s) at mouth with Deep River

Basin features
- Progression: Rocky River → Deep River → Cape Fear River → Atlantic Ocean
- River system: Deep River
- Tributaries
  - left: unnamed tributaries
  - right: unnamed tributaries
- Bridges: W Wendover Avenue, Cates Drive, I-73, Ruffin Road, Hilltop Road, Bridle Ridge Parkway, Adams Farm Parkway, Mackay Road, Guilford College Road, E Main Street, Oakdale Road

Bull Run is a 6.64 mi (10.69 km) long 3rd order tributary to the Deep River in Guilford County, North Carolina.

== Course ==
Bull Run rises in a pond about 1 mile west of Greensboro, North Carolina in Guilford County and then flows southwest to join the Deep River about 0.1 miles southwest of Oakdale, North Carolina.

== Watershed ==
Bull Run drains 7.78 square miles (20.2 km^{2}) of area, receives about 45.5 in/year of precipitation, and has a wetness index of 417.65 and is about 22% forested.

== See also ==
- List of rivers of North Carolina
