= Marion Jasper Jordan Farm =

Historic house in North Carolina, United States

- U.S. National Register of Historic Places
- Location within North Carolina Location within the United States
- Location: R. Jordan Rd./SR 2145, near Gulf, North Carolina
- Coordinates: 35°33′27″N 79°16′13″W
- Area: 22.9 acres (9.3 ha)
- Built: 1893
- Architectural style: Queen Anne, Folk Victorian
- MPS: Chatham County MRA
- NRHP reference No.: 88000169
- Added to NRHP: February 25, 1988

Marion Jasper Jordan Farm, also known as Jordan Place, is a historic home and farm located near Gulf, Chatham County, North Carolina. The main house was built about 1893, and is a large two-story Late Victorian / Queen Anne style frame dwelling. It has a two-story rear all. It features a nearly-full-facade, full-height two-tiered entry porch. Also on the property are the contributing wellhouse (c. 1900), flower house (c. 1900), blacksmith's shop (c. 1920), and caretaker's cottage (c. 1910).

It was listed on the National Register of Historic Places in 1988.
