= Hasketts Creek =

Stream in North Carolina, USA

Hasketts Creek Tributary to Deep River
- Location of Hasketts Creek mouth Hasketts Creek (the United States)

Location
- Country: United States
- State: North Carolina
- County: Randolph

Physical characteristics
- Source: Cedar Fork Creek divide
  - location: Asheboro, North Carolina
  - coordinates: 35°42′25″N 079°49′11″W
  - elevation: 805 ft (245 m)
- Mouth: Deep River
  - location: about 0.25 miles north of Central Falls, North Carolina
  - coordinates: 35°46′05″N 079°46′29″W
  - elevation: 565 ft (172 m)
- Length: 7.25 mi (11.67 km)
- Basin size: 14.20 square miles (36.8 km^{2})
- Discharge
  - location: Deep River
  - average: 14.33 cu ft/s (0.406 m^{3}/s) at mouth with Deep River

Basin features
- Progression: Deep River → Cape Fear River → Atlantic Ocean
- River system: Deep River
- Tributaries
  - left: unnamed tributaries
  - right: Penwood Branch
- Bridges: W Salisbury Street, W Presnell Street, Little Gate Drive, US 220 (Vision Drive), W Bailey Street, W Balfour Avenue, W Central Avenue, Greenvale Road, Fayetteville Street, Hub Morris Road, Wow Road

Hasketts Creek is a 7.25 mi (11.67 km) long 3rd order tributary to the Deep River in Randolph County, North Carolina. Hasketts Creek is the only stream of this name in the United States. Hasketts Creek is listed as non-supporting and as having an impaired biological community.

== Course ==
Hasketts Creek rises in Asheboro in Randolph County, North Carolina and then flows north-northeast to join the Deep River about 0.25 miles north of Central Falls, North Carolina.

== Watershed ==
Hasketts Creek drains 14.20 square miles (36.8 km^{2}) of area, receives about 46.9 in/year of precipitation, and has a wetness index of 393.36 and is about 32% forested.
