= Richland Creek (Deep River tributary, Guilford) =

Stream in North Carolina, USA

Richland Creek Tributary to Deep River
- Location of Richland Creek mouth Richland Creek (Deep River tributary, Guilford) (the United States)

Location
- Country: United States
- State: North Carolina
- County: Guilford

Physical characteristics
- Source: Payne Creek divide
  - location: High Point, North Carolina
  - coordinates: 35°56′27″N 080°01′09″W
  - elevation: 870 ft (270 m)
- Mouth: Deep River
  - location: about 3 miles southeast of High Point, North Carolina
  - coordinates: 35°56′27″N 079°53′57″W
  - elevation: 678 ft (207 m)
- Length: 8.76 mi (14.10 km)
- Basin size: 16.11 square miles (41.7 km^{2})
- Discharge
  - location: Deep River
  - average: 18.31 cu ft/s (0.518 m^{3}/s) at mouth with Deep River

Basin features
- Progression: Deep River → Cape Fear River → Atlantic Ocean
- River system: Deep River
- Tributaries
  - left: unnamed tributaries
  - right: Mile Branch
- Bridges: W Green Drive, S Elm Street, W Market Center Drive, Jarrell Street, I-85, S Main Street, I-85, I-74, Baker Road, Jackson Lake Road, Kersey Valley Road, I-85, Riverdale Drive

Richland Creek is a 8.76 mi (14.10 km) long 3rd order tributary to the Deep River in Guilford County, North Carolina. This stream is one of two streams named Richland Creek on the right bank of the Deep River. The other Richland Creek is in Randolph County.

== Course ==
Richland Creek rises in High Point, North Carolina in Guilford County and then flows east to join the Deep River about 3 miles southeast of High Point.

== Watershed ==
Richland Creek drains 16.11 square miles (41.7 km^{2}) of area, receives about 46.1 in/year of precipitation, and has a wetness index of 415.28 and is about 19% forested.
