= Copper Branch (Deep River tributary) =

Stream in North Carolina, USA

Copper Branch Tributary to Deep River
- Location of Copper Branch mouth Copper Branch (Deep River tributary) (the United States)

Location
- Country: United States
- State: North Carolina
- County: Guilford

Physical characteristics
- Source: unnamed tributary to Deep River divide
  - location: about 2 miles east of High Point, North Carolina
  - coordinates: 35°57′47″N 079°56′14″W
  - elevation: 790 ft (240 m)
- Mouth: Deep River
  - location: about 1 mile east of High Point, North Carolina
  - coordinates: 35°57′58″N 079°54′50″W
  - elevation: 680 ft (210 m)
- Length: 1.50 mi (2.41 km)
- Basin size: 1.00 square mile (2.6 km^{2})
- Discharge
  - location: Deep River
  - average: 1.26 cu ft/s (0.036 m^{3}/s) at mouth with Deep River

Basin features
- Progression: Deep River → Cape Fear River → Atlantic Ocean
- River system: Deep River
- Tributaries
  - left: unnamed tributaries
  - right: unnamed tributaries
- Bridges: I-85, Hayworth Springs Road, Riverdale Drive

Copper Branch is a 1.50 mi (2.41 km) long 1st order tributary to the Deep River in Guilford County, North Carolina. This branch flows through a lot of mined areas and could be the reason for the name.

== Course ==
Copper Branch rises about 2 miles east of High Point, North Carolina in Guilford County and then flows east to join the Deep River about 1 mile east of High Point, North Carolina.

== Watershed ==
Copper Branch drains 1.00 square mile (2.6 km^{2}) of area, receives about 46.0 in/year of precipitation, and has a wetness index of 365.84 and is about 33% forested.
