= Haughton-McIver House =

Historic house in North Carolina, United States

- U.S. National Register of Historic Places
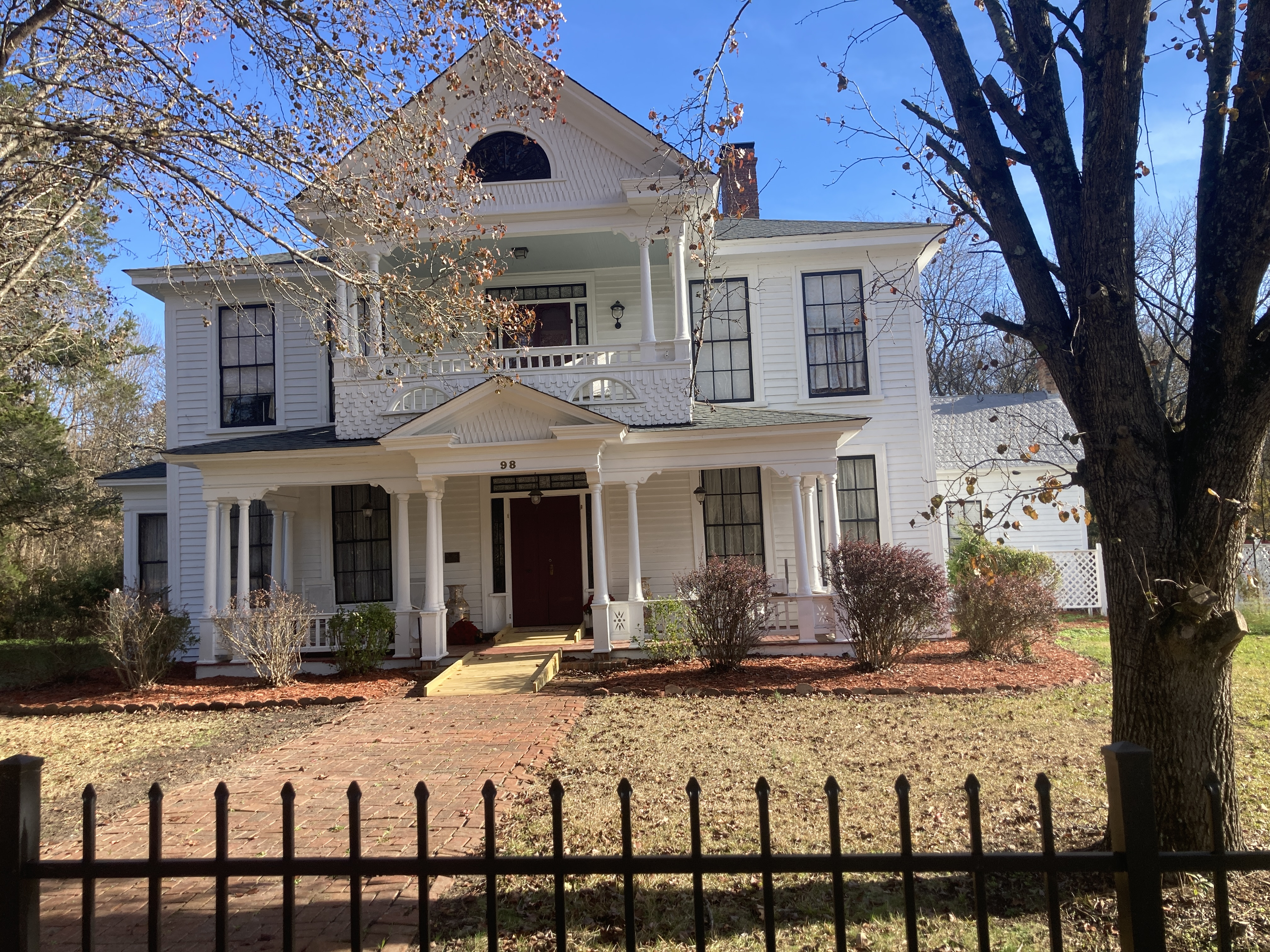

- Location within North Carolina Location within the United States
- Location: SR 1007, Gulf, North Carolina
- Coordinates: 35°33′26″N 79°17′5″W
- Area: 7 acres (2.8 ha)
- Built: c. 1830-1840
- Architectural style: Greek Revival, Queen Anne, Vernacular Greek Revival
- MPS: Chatham County MRA
- NRHP reference No.: 85001455
- Added to NRHP: July 5, 1985

The Haughton-McIver House is a historic home located at Gulf, Chatham County, North Carolina. It is part of the Chatham County Multiple Resource Area (or MRA). Built in the 1840s, it was added to the National Register of Historic Places on July 5, 1985. The house was built as a hotel for guests of the Haughton Plantation.
