= Big Buffalo Creek (Deep River tributary) =

Stream in North Carolina, USA

Big Buffalo Creek Tributary to Deep River
- Location of Big Buffalo Creek mouth Big Buffalo Creek (Deep River tributary) (the United States)

Location
- Country: United States
- State: North Carolina
- County: Lee
- City: Sanford

Physical characteristics
- Source: confluence of Skunk Creek and Persimmon Creek
  - location: Sanford, North Carolina
  - coordinates: 35°28′33″N 079°11′48″W
  - elevation: 285 ft (87 m)
- Mouth: Deep River
  - location: about 0.25 miles southeast of Cumnock, North Carolina
  - coordinates: 35°33′08″N 079°13′34″W
  - elevation: 205 ft (62 m)
- Length: 7.48 mi (12.04 km)
- Basin size: 20.28 square miles (52.5 km^{2})
- Discharge
  - location: Deep River
  - average: 23.35 cu ft/s (0.661 m^{3}/s) at mouth with Deep River

Basin features
- Progression: Deep River → Cape Fear River → Atlantic Ocean
- River system: Deep River
- Tributaries
  - left: Persimmon Creek; Purgatory Branch
  - right: Skunk Creek
- Bridges: US1-US15, Carbonton Road, Old Carbonton Road, Spring Lane, US 421, McNeill Road, US 421, Cotten Road

Big Buffalo Creek is a 20.28 mi (32.64 km) long 3rd order tributary to the Deep River in Lee County, North Carolina.

== Course ==
Big Buffalo Creek is formed at the confluence of Skunk Creek and Persimmon Creek in Sanford, North Carolina and then flows northwest to the Deep River about 0.25 miles southeast of Cumnock, North Carolina.

== Watershed ==
Big Buffalo Creek drains 20.28 square miles (52.5 km^{2}) of area, receives about 47.7 in/year of precipitation, and has a wetness index of 418.37 and is about 42% forested.

== See also ==
- List of rivers of North Carolina
