= Bear Creek (Deep River tributary) =

Stream in North Carolina, USA

Bear Creek Tributary to Deep River
- Location of Bear Creek mouth Bear Creek (Deep River tributary) (the United States)

Location
- Country: United States
- State: North Carolina
- County: Moore; Randolph

Physical characteristics
- Source: Asheworth Branch divide
  - location: Pond in Seagrove, North Carolina
  - coordinates: 35°32′07″N 079°46′04″W
  - elevation: 700 ft (210 m)
- Mouth: Deep River
  - location: about 1 mile west of High Falls, North Carolina
  - coordinates: 35°28′47″N 079°33′16″W
  - elevation: 298 ft (91 m)
- Length: 21.78 mi (35.05 km)
- Basin size: 145.43 square miles (376.7 km^{2})
- Discharge
  - location: Deep River
  - average: 155.13 cu ft/s (4.393 m^{3}/s) at mouth with Deep River

Basin features
- Progression: Deep River → Cape Fear River → Atlantic Ocean
- River system: Deep River
- Tributaries
  - left: unnamed tributaries
  - right: West Branch, Williams Creek, Wolf Creek, Cabin Creek
- Bridges: Boone Street, NC 705, US 220, Upper Branch, Adams Road, Chrisco Road W, Dover Church Road, Dan Road, Browns Mill Road, NC 705, Reynolds Mill Road

Bear Creek is a 21.78 mi (35.05 km) long 4th order tributary to the Deep River in Moore and Randolph Counties, North Carolina.

== Course ==
Bear Creek rises in a pond in Seagrove, North Carolina in Randolph County and then flows southeast into Moore County and then turns northeast at Robbins, North Carolina to join the Deep River about 1 mile west of High Falls, North Carolina.

== Watershed ==
Bear Creek drains 145.43 square miles (376.7 km^{2}) of area, receives about 47.8 in/year of precipitation, and has a wetness index of 405.73 and is about 58% forested.

== See also ==
- List of rivers of North Carolina
