= Cedar Falls, North Carolina =

- Unincorporated community
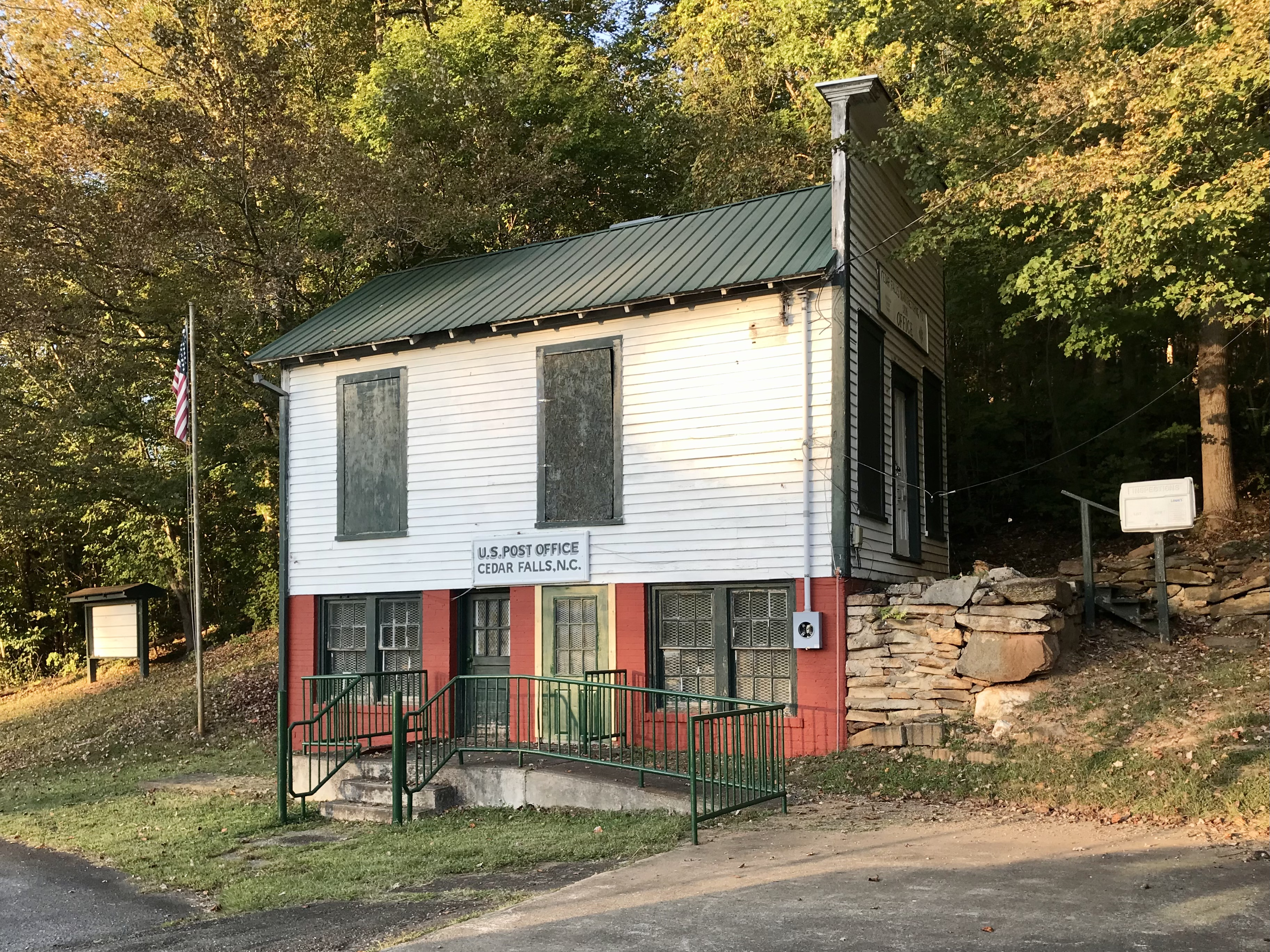
- Former Cedar Falls post office

- Location within North Carolina Location within the United States
- Coordinates: 35°45′07″N 79°43′53″W
- Country: United States
- State: North Carolina
- County: Randolph
- Incorporated: 1899 (repealed 1901)
- Elevation: 512 ft (156 m)
- Time zone: UTC-5 (Eastern (EST))
  - Summer (DST): UTC-4 (EDT)
- ZIP code: 27230
- Area code: 336
- GNIS feature ID: 1019575

Cedar Falls is an unincorporated community in Randolph County, North Carolina, United States. The community is located along the Deep River, 5.5 miles (8.9 km) northeast of Asheboro. Cedar Falls has a post office with ZIP code 27230, which opened on March 4, 1878.

== History ==
Cedar Falls was originally named Everett's Mill, in reference to Benjamin Everett. The first cotton mill in Randolph County, Sapona Cotton Mills, was established in the community in 1836. Cedar Falls was incorporated in 1899 but its incorporated status was revoked two years later.

== Geography ==
The community is located in central Randolph County and sits along the Deep River.

== Works cited ==
- Powell, William S.; Hill, Michael (2010). The North Carolina Gazetteer, 2nd Ed: A Dictionary of Tar Heel Places and Their History. University of North Carolina Press. ISBN 9780807898291.
