= Carbonton, North Carolina =

Unincorporated community

Coordinates: 35°31′14″N 79°20′56″W

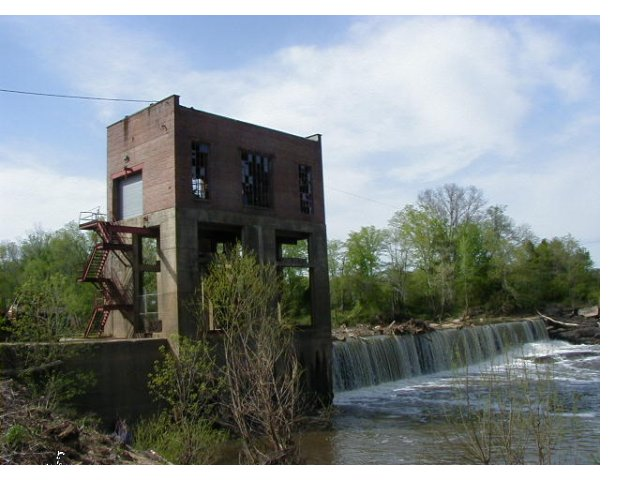
Carbonton Dam before its destruction in 2005. The powerhouse remains extant.

Carbonton is an unincorporated community in southwestern Chatham County, North Carolina, United States, along the Deep River. The community lies near the point where Chatham, Lee, and Moore counties intersect one another. The community derived its name from the local coal industry that thrived nearby until the early 20th century.

A dam was erected on the Deep River in Carbonton in the early 1800s. In the 1920s, the Carolina Power & Light Company established a hydroelectric plant at the dam, making it the first power plant in the Sandhills region. In 2005, the dam was removed to improve the river ecosystem, but the powerhouse was unaltered.
