= Patterson Creek (Iowa) =

Stream in Allamakee County, Iowa, U.S.

Coordinates: 43.366640°N 91.573199°W

Patterson Creek is a stream in Allamakee County, Iowa, in the United States.

Patterson Creek was named for Seth and Darwin Patterson, pioneers who settled at the creek.

== See also ==
- List of rivers of Iowa
