= Elberta, North Carolina =

Coordinates: 35°17′06″N 79°37′57″W

Elberta, North Carolina, is at the southern terminus of North Carolina Highway 705, on North Carolina Highway 211, in Moore County, North Carolina. The community operates as a peach growing center. Named after the Elberta Peach Company.
