= Indian Creek (Deep River tributary) =

Stream in North Carolina, USA

Indian Creek Tributary to Deep River
- Location of Indian Creek mouth Indian Creek (Deep River tributary) (the United States)

Location
- Country: United States
- State: North Carolina
- County: Chatham County

Physical characteristics
- Source: Bear Creek divide
  - location: about 0.5 miles west of Goldston, North Carolina
  - coordinates: 35°35′46″N 079°21′07″W
  - elevation: 440 ft (130 m)
- Mouth: Deep River
  - location: about 1.5 miles southwest of Gulf, North Carolina
  - coordinates: 35°32′40″N 079°19′26″W
  - elevation: 210 ft (64 m)
- Length: 7.15 mi (11.51 km)
- Basin size: 25.92 square miles (67.1 km^{2})
- Discharge
  - location: Deep River
  - average: 29.95 cu ft/s (0.848 m^{3}/s) at mouth with Deep River

Basin features
- Progression: Rocky River → Deep River → Cape Fear River → Atlantic Ocean
- River system: Deep River
- Tributaries
  - left: Little Indian Creek
  - right: unnamed tributaries
- Bridges: Goldston-Glendon Road, Roberts Chapel Road, Goldston-Carbonton Road

Indian Creek is a 7.15 mi (11.51 km) long 3rd order tributary to the Deep River in Chatham County, North Carolina.

== Course ==
Indian Creek rises about 0.5 miles west of Goldston, North Carolina and then flows southeasterly to join the Deep River about 1.5 miles southwest of Gulf, North Carolina.

== Watershed ==
Indian Creek drains 25.92 square miles (67.1 km^{2}) of area, receives about 47.7 in/year of precipitation, has a wetness index of 408.42 and is about 54% forested.

== See also ==
- List of rivers of North Carolina
