= Brush Creek (Deep River tributary) =

Stream in North Carolina, USA

Brush Creek Tributary to Deep River
- Location of Brush Creek mouth Brush Creek (Deep River tributary) (the United States)

Location
- Country: United States
- State: North Carolina
- County: Randolph; Chatham

Physical characteristics
- Source: Mt Pleasant Creek divide
  - location: about 1.5 miles west of Staley, North Carolina
  - coordinates: 35°47′30″N 079°35′12″W
  - elevation: 685 ft (209 m)
- Mouth: Deep River
  - location: about 1 mile west of Cheeks, North Carolina
  - coordinates: 35°35′32″N 079°36′23″W
  - elevation: 347 ft (106 m)
- Length: 23.09 mi (37.16 km)
- Basin size: 69.05 square miles (178.8 km^{2})
- Discharge
  - location: Deep River
  - average: 80.67 cu ft/s (2.284 m^{3}/s) at mouth with Deep River

Basin features
- Progression: Rocky River → Deep River → Cape Fear River → Atlantic Ocean
- River system: Deep River
- Tributaries
  - left: Reedy Fork; Blood Run; Little Brush Creek
  - right: unnamed tributaries
- Bridges: Old Staley Road, Langley Road, Browns Crossroads Road, Hicks Farm Road, US 64, Morris Chapel Road, Coleridge Road, Manor Rock Road, Lanes Mill Road, Lambeth Mill Road, NC 42

Brush Creek is a 23.09 mi (37.16 km) long 3rd order tributary to the Deep River in Randolph and Chatham Counties, North Carolina.

== Course ==
Brush Creek rises about 1.5 miles west of Staley, North Carolina in Randolph County and then flows southerly briefly flowing into Chatham County before re-entering Randolph County and joining the Deep River about 1 mile west of Cheeks, North Carolina.

== Watershed ==
Brush Creek drains 69.05 square miles (178.8 km^{2}) of area, receives about 47.6 in/year of precipitation, and has a wetness index of 417.16 and is about 53% forested.

== See also ==
- List of rivers of North Carolina
