= Glendon, North Carolina =

Coordinates: 35°28′57″N 79°25′01″W

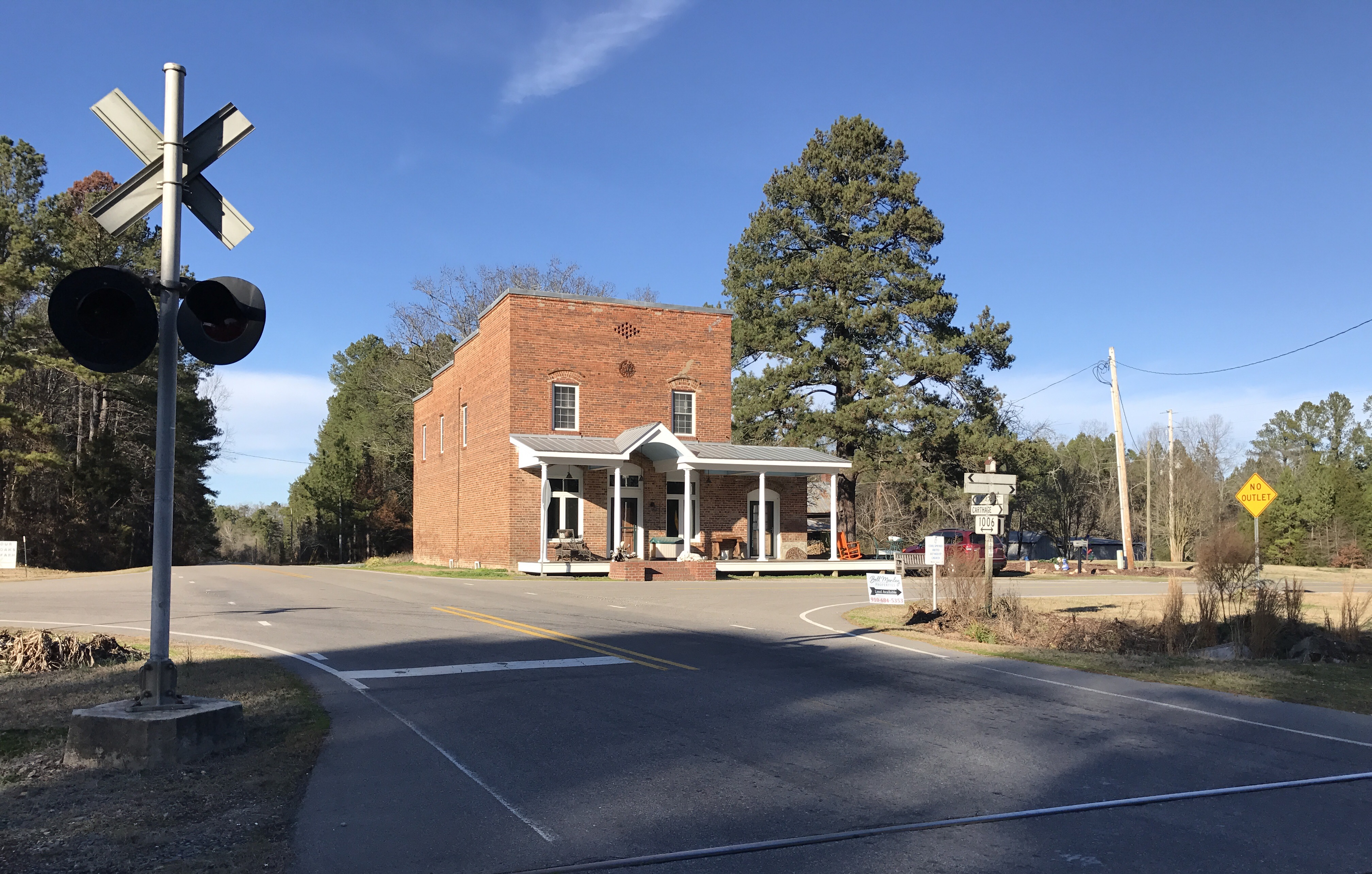
Glendon, North Carolina

Glendon is an unincorporated community in Moore County, North Carolina, United States.

== History ==
Glendon sits at an altitude of 301 feet above sea level. It was originally known as Fair Haven. Residents of the community changed its name to Glendon in honor of E. F. Glenn, the original owner of the land on which the community was established. In 1897 a railroad was laid through the village and a depot was built. For a time the depot hosted a telegraph station, but the cable was removed at an unknown date before 1924. In 1900 the North Carolina Geological Survey identified large deposits of pyrophyllite (locally mislabeled talc) nearby. Shortly thereafter several companies established mining operations to extract the mineral. The railroad was used to ship the pyrophyllite. The town also hosted a post office, though by 2009 it was in disuse.

In 1963 the population of Glendon was estimated to number at no greater than 25 people. The railway depot was demolished in 1972. In 2014 a firefighting and emergency medical service station was built in the village. Since the 2015, the community has hosted a biannual music festival, Glendonfest.
