= Bear Creek (Rocky River tributary) =

Stream in North Carolina, USA

Bear Creek Tributary to Rocky River
- Location of Bear Creek mouth Bear Creek (Rocky River tributary) (the United States)

Location
- Country: United States
- State: North Carolina
- County: Chatham

Physical characteristics
- Source: Brush Creek divide
  - location: about 4 miles west-southwest of Bonlee, North Carolina
  - coordinates: 35°38′14″N 079°29′03″W
  - elevation: 565 ft (172 m)
- Mouth: Rocky River
  - location: about 6 miles south of Pittsboro, North Carolina
  - coordinates: 35°37′52″N 079°12′26″W
  - elevation: 275 ft (84 m)
- Length: 24.49 mi (39.41 km)
- Basin size: 51.71 square miles (133.9 km^{2})
- Discharge
  - location: Rocky River
  - average: 59.07 cu ft/s (1.673 m^{3}/s) at mouth with Rocky River

Basin features
- Progression: Rocky River → Deep River → Cape Fear River → Atlantic Ocean
- River system: Deep River
- Tributaries
  - left: Little Bear Creek; Harts Creek
  - right: unnamed tributaries
- Bridges: Bonlee-Bennett Road, Siler City-Glendon Road, Edwards Hill Church Road, NC 902, Bonlee-Carbonton Road, Old US 421, US 421, Vernie Phillips Road, Meronies Church Road, Pittsboro-Goldston Road, Marys Chapel Road, Woody Dam Road

Bear Creek is a 24.49 mi (39.41 km) long 4th order tributary to the Rocky River in Chatham County, North Carolina.

== Course ==
Bear Creek rises about 4 miles west-southwest of Bonlee, North Carolina in Chatham County and then follows an easterly course to join the Rocky River about 6 miles south of Pittsboro.

== Watershed ==
Bear Creek drains 51.71 square miles (133.9 km^{2}) of area, receives about 47.6 in/year of precipitation, has a wetness index of 444.18 and is about 55% forested.
