= Harpers Crossroads, North Carolina =

Unincorporated community in North Carolina, US

Coordinates: 35°34′05″N 79°27′47″W

Harpers Crossroads is an unincorporated community in Chatham County, North Carolina, United States. It is located at the intersection of State Highway 902, and Siler City Glendon Rd.
