= Gulf, North Carolina =

- Census-designated place
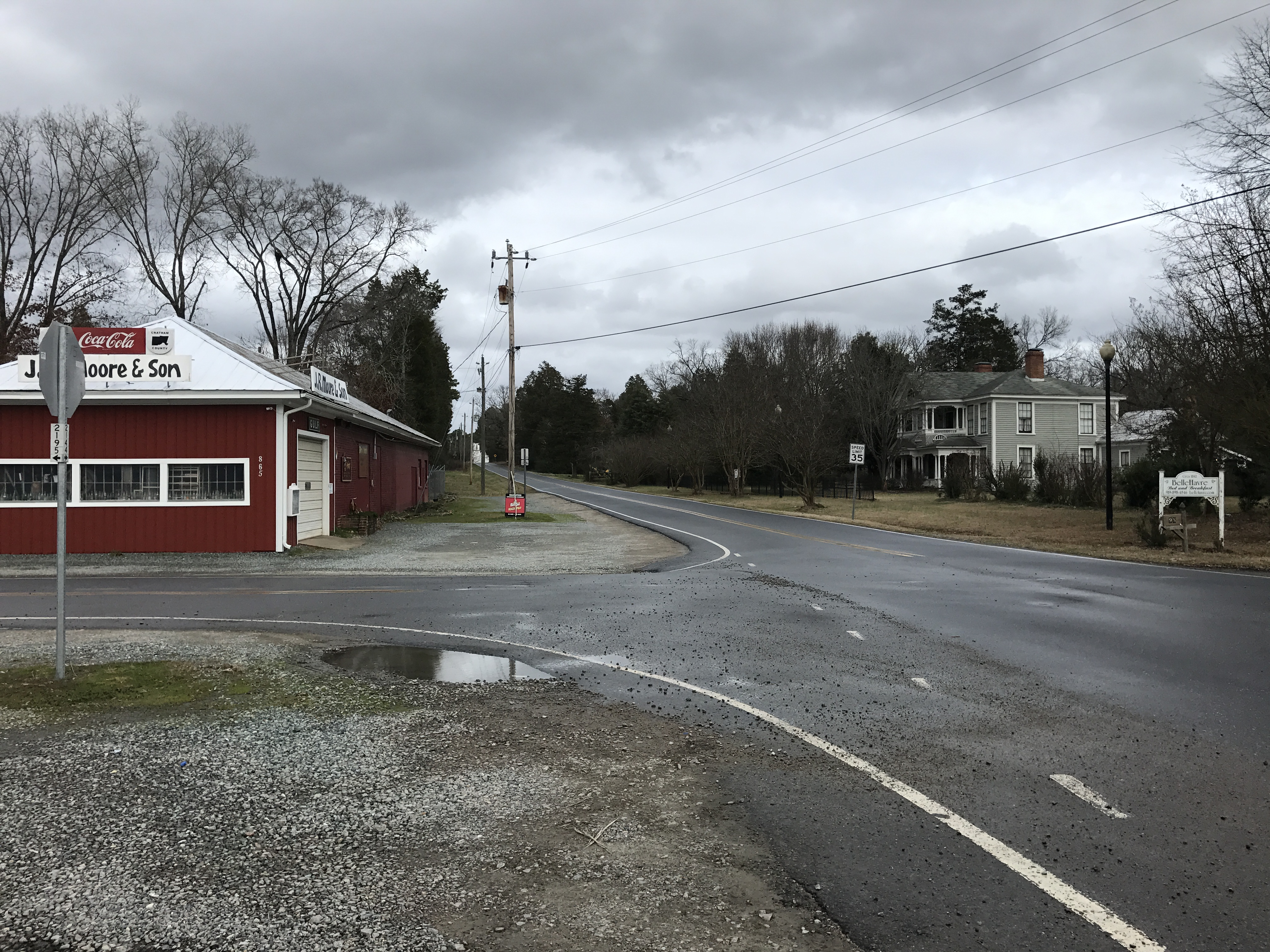

- Location within North Carolina
- Coordinates: 35°33′35″N 79°16′50″W
- Country: United States
- State: North Carolina
- County: Chatham

Area
  - Total: 0.92 sq mi (2.38 km^{2})
  - Land: 0.91 sq mi (2.35 km^{2})
  - Water: 0.012 sq mi (0.03 km^{2})
- Elevation: 266 ft (81 m)

Population (2020)
  - Total: 122
  - Density: 134.3/sq mi (51.85/km^{2})
- Time zone: UTC-5 (Eastern (EST))
  - Summer (DST): UTC-4 (EDT)
- ZIP code: 27256
- FIPS code: 37-28600
- GNIS feature ID: 2628630

Gulf is an unincorporated community and census-designated place (CDP) in southwestern Chatham County, North Carolina, United States, southeast of the town of Goldston. As of the 2020 census, Gulf had a population of 122. The community is home to a general store and several historic homes. It received its name from its location at a wide bend in the Deep River.

Gulf is an interconnection point between the Norfolk Southern Railway and the Aberdeen, Carolina and Western Railway.

== Historic sites ==
The Haughton-McIver House and Marion Jasper Jordan Farm are listed on the National Register of Historic Places.

== Geography ==
Gulf is located on the southern border of Chatham County, on the north side of Deep River. The Cape Fear River forms at the confluence of the Deep and Haw rivers, approximately 20 miles downstream of Gulf. Gulf is 16 miles (26 km) southeast of Siler City and 8 miles (13 km) northwest of Sanford. Pittsboro, the Chatham County seat, is 17 miles (27 km) to the northeast via the Pittsboro-Goldston Road.

According to the United States Census Bureau, the Gulf CDP has a total area of 0.92 square miles (2.39 km^{2}), of which 0.01 square miles (0.03 km^{2}), or 1.18%, is water.

Gulf is at the geographical center of North Carolina.

== Demographics ==
Historical population
Census	Pop.	Note	%±
2020	122		—
U.S. Decennial Census
