= High Falls, North Carolina =

- Unincorporated community
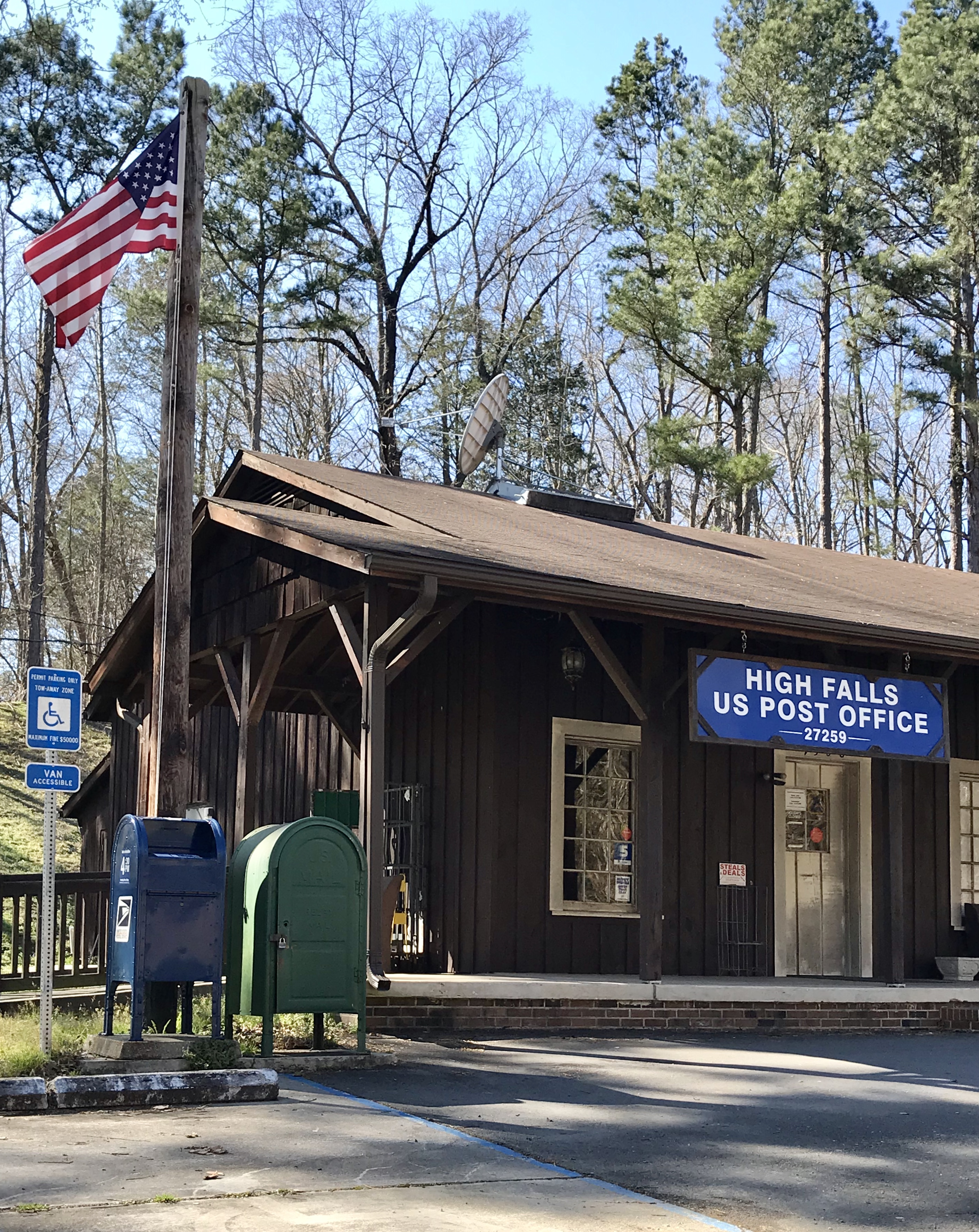
- High Falls post office

- Location within North Carolina Location within the United States
- Coordinates: 35°29′02″N 79°31′18″W
- Country: United States
- State: North Carolina
- County: Moore
- Elevation: 364 ft (111 m)
- Time zone: UTC-5 (Eastern (EST))
  - Summer (DST): UTC-4 (EDT)
- ZIP Code: 27259 (Highfalls)
- Area codes: 910, 472
- GNIS feature ID: 1020730

High Falls or Highfalls is an unincorporated community in Moore County, North Carolina, United States. The community is located along North Carolina Highway 22 and the Deep River 11.2 miles (18.0 km) north-northwest of Carthage. High Falls has a post office with ZIP code 27259.

The community was originally known as the Great Falls or the Big Falls in homage to a 15-foot waterfall in the Deep River at the site. In 1780 William England established a grist mill at the location. In 1904, Thomas Woody built a spinning mill, a cotton mill, and a grist mill, incorporating them as the High Falls Manufacturing Company. In the late 19th century a small, single-room school was built for the community. It was later replaced by a larger structure. In the late 19th century the High Falls Dam on the Deep River was also constructed. It was modified in the 1920s to generate hydroelectricity for Hydrodyne Industries. In April 2018 the dam was acquired by Unique Places L.L.C., a real estate investment firm which proposed removing the dam to improve the river ecosystem of Cape Fear shiner. The plan was suspended indefinitely due to opposition from local residents.
