= National Register of Historic Places listings in Orange County, North Carolina =

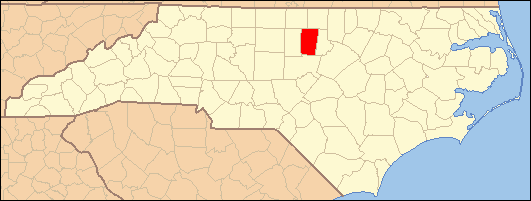

This list includes properties and districts listed on the National Register of Historic Places in Orange County, North Carolina. Click the "Map of all coordinates" link to the right to view an online map of all properties and districts with latitude and longitude coordinates in the table below.

== Current listings ==
This National Park Service list is complete through NPS recent listings posted June 19, 2026.

	Name on the Register	Image	Date listed	Location	City or town	Description
1	Alberta Mill Complex	Alberta Mill Complex	January 19, 1976 (#76001332)	NE corner Weaver and N. Greensboro Sts. 35°54′41″N 79°04′17″W	Carrboro	
2	Ayr Mount	Ayr Mount	August 26, 1971 (#71000606)	St. Mary's Rd. 36°04′37″N 79°05′30″W	Hillsborough	
3	Bellevue Manufacturing Company	Bellevue Manufacturing Company	August 28, 2003 (#03000858)	Nash St. and Eno St. 36°04′23″N 79°06′41″W	Hillsborough	
4	Beta Theta Pi Fraternity House	Beta Theta Pi Fraternity House	April 20, 2005 (#05000325)	114 South Columbia St. 35°54′49″N 79°03′20″W	Chapel Hill	
5	Bingham School	Bingham School	January 18, 1978 (#78001969)	NC 54 and SR 1007; 35°57′13″N 79°15′16″W	Oaks	
6	Burwell School	Burwell School	September 15, 1970 (#70000465)	N. Churton St. 36°04′45″N 79°06′00″W	Hillsborough	
7	Cabe-Pratt-Harris House		April 22, 1999 (#99000481)	NC 1567. 0.9 miles N. of Eno River Bridge; 36°03′29″N 79°00′28″W	Hillsborough	
8	Carolina Inn	Carolina Inn	August 6, 1999 (#99000867)	211 Pittsboro St. 35°54′36″N 79°03′18″W	Chapel Hill	
9	Carrboro Commercial Historic District	Carrboro Commercial Historic District	June 20, 1985 (#85001339)	100 Blk. of E. Main St. between Greensboro Rd. & Roberson St. 35°54′37″N 79°04′18″W	Carrboro	
10	Cedar Grove Rural Crossroads Historic District	Cedar Grove Rural Crossroads Historic District	April 23, 1998 (#98000389)	Roughly along Carr Store Rd. and Efland-Cedar Grove Rd. 36°10′12″N 79°10′11″W	Cedar Grove	
11	Cedar Grove School		April 23, 2020 (#100005201)	5800 NC 86 North; 36°10′44″N 79°08′10″W	Cedar Grove	
12	Chapel Hill Historic District	Chapel Hill Historic District	December 16, 1971 (#71000604)	Battle Park, E. Franklin and E. Rosemary Sts. residences, and central campus of University of North Carolina; also roughly bounded by Carolina Ave., North, Cameron & Columbia Sts. 35°54′45″N 79°03′08″W	Chapel Hill	Second set of addresses represents a boundary increase, 2015
13	Chapel Hill Town Hall	Chapel Hill Town Hall	March 20, 1990 (#90000364)	Rosemary and Columbia Sts. 35°54′51″N 79°03′25″W	Chapel Hill	
14	Chapel of the Cross	Chapel of the Cross	February 1, 1972 (#72000980)	304 E. Franklin St. 35°54′58″N 79°02′39″W	Chapel Hill	
15	Coker Hills Historic District		June 10, 2026 (#100013116)	Allard, Audubon, Clayton, Curtis, Lyons, Michaux, North Elliott, and Velma Roads; South Lakeshore Drive; Wood Circle; 35°56′20″N 79°02′09″W	Chapel Hill	
16	Commandant's House	Commandant's House	November 9, 1972 (#72000981)	Barracks Rd. 36°04′19″N 79°07′22″W	Hillsborough	
17	Eagle Lodge	Eagle Lodge	April 16, 1971 (#71000607)	142 W. King St. 36°04′31″N 79°05′59″W	Hillsborough	Masonic Lodge
18	Eno Cotton Mill	Eno Cotton Mill	September 1, 2011 (#11000622)	437 Dimmocks Mill Rd. 36°04′14″N 79°06′48″W	Hillsborough	
19	Faucett Mill and House	Faucett Mill and House	August 4, 1988 (#88001175)	Faucette Mill Rd. on the E side of Eno River; 36°06′04″N 79°08′25″W	Hillsborough	
20	David Faucette House	David Faucette House	November 22, 1999 (#99001391)	1830 Hall's Mill Rd. 36°07′21″N 79°09′20″W	Efland	
21	Gimghoul Neighborhood Historic District	Gimghoul Neighborhood Historic District	August 5, 1993 (#93000807)	Roughly bounded by Gimghoul Rd., Ridge Ln., and Gladon Dr. 35°54′47″N 79°02′24″W	Chapel Hill	
22	Hazel-Nash House	Hazel-Nash House	March 31, 1971 (#71000608)	116 W. Queen St. 36°04′44″N 79°06′04″W	Hillsborough	
23	Heartsease	Heartsease	April 11, 1973 (#73001362)	115 E. Queen St. 36°04′44″N 79°06′07″W	Hillsborough	
24	Hillsborough Historic District	Hillsborough Historic District	October 15, 1973 (#73001363)	Roughly bounded by N. Nash and W. Corbin Sts., Highland Loop Rd., and Eno River; 36°04′25″N 79°05′44″W	Hillsborough	
25	Alexander Hogan Plantation	Alexander Hogan Plantation	March 4, 1996 (#96000186)	Rogers Road and Eubanks Road	Chapel Hill	
26	Thomas and Mary Hogan House	Thomas and Mary Hogan House	January 26, 2001 (#01000016)	9118 Hillsborough Rd. 35°56′27″N 79°06′15″W	Carrboro	
27	Holden-Roberts Farm	Holden-Roberts Farm	May 2, 2002 (#02000436)	NC 1002, 1 miles E of NC 1538; 36°06′36″N 79°02′11″W	Hillsborough	
28	Jacob Jackson Farm	Jacob Jackson Farm	March 17, 1994 (#94000184)	NC 1002, 0.4 miles W of NC 1538; 36°05′35″N 79°03′37″W	Hillsborough	
29	Dr. Arch Jordan House	Dr. Arch Jordan House	August 6, 1998 (#98000995)	7015 NC 57; 36°11′06″N 79°01′08″W	Caldwell	
30	Thomas F. Lloyd Historic District	Thomas F. Lloyd Historic District	August 14, 1986 (#86001625)	Roughly bounded by E. Carr St., Maple Ave., and S. Greensboro St. 35°54′26″N 79°04′17″W	Carrboro	
31	Montrose	Montrose	October 28, 2001 (#01001187)	320 St. Mary's Rd. 36°04′41″N 79°08′36″W	Hillsborough	
32	Moorefields	Moorefields	April 25, 1972 (#72000982)	N of jct. of SR 1134 and 1135; 36°03′07″N 79°08′43″W	Hillsborough	
33	Murphey School	Murphey School	August 20, 2009 (#09000637)	3729 Murphy School Rd. 36°01′44″N 79°00′52″W	Hillsborough	
34	Nash Law Office	Nash Law Office	September 28, 1971 (#71000609)	143 W. Margaret Lane; 36°04′27″N 79°06′05″W	Hillsborough	
35	Nash-Hooper House	Nash-Hooper House	November 11, 1971 (#71000610)	118 W. Tryon St. 36°04′03″N 79°06′03″W	Hillsborough	
36	Arthur C. and Mary S.A. Nash House	Arthur C. and Mary S.A. Nash House	October 26, 2017 (#100001633)	124 S. Boundary St. 35°54′50″N 79°02′43″W	Chapel Hill	
37	Navy Reserve Officers Training Corps (NROTC) Naval Armory at UNC-Chapel Hill	Navy Reserve Officers Training Corps (NROTC) Naval Armory at UNC-Chapel Hill	February 7, 2024 (#100009948)	221 South Columbia St. 35°54′32″N 79°03′11″W	Chapel Hill	
38	Jeter and Ethel Neville House	Jeter and Ethel Neville House	August 1, 2023 (#100007247)	107 Cobb St. 35°54′42″N 79°04′06″W	Carrboro	
39	North Carolina Industrial Home for Colored Girls		January 25, 2018 (#100002051)	201 Redman Crossing; 36°04′56″N 79°12′09″W	Efland vicinity	
40	Occoneechee Speedway	Occoneechee Speedway	May 2, 2002 (#02000435)	Elizabeth Brady, 0.3 N of US 70 Business; 36°04′23″N 79°04′57″W	Hillsborough	
41	Old Chapel Hill Cemetery	Old Chapel Hill Cemetery	June 3, 1994 (#94000570)	Jct. of NC 54 and County Club Rd., NW corner 35°54′40″N 79°02′34″W	Chapel Hill	
42	Old East, University of North Carolina	Old East, University of North Carolina	October 15, 1966 (#66000596)	University of North Carolina campus 35°54′45″N 79°03′03″W	Chapel Hill	
43	Old Orange County Courthouse	Old Orange County Courthouse	June 24, 1971 (#71000611)	106 E. King St. 36°05′34″N 79°05′56″W	Hillsborough	
44	Paisley-Rice Log House		January 31, 1979 (#79001740)	N of Mebane; 36°07′33″N 79°15′22″W	Mebane	
45	Playmakers Theatre	Playmakers Theatre	June 24, 1971 (#71000605)	Cameron Ave., University of North Carolina campus 35°54′24″N 79°03′02″W	Chapel Hill	
46	Capt. John S. Pope Farm	Capt. John S. Pope Farm	April 23, 2013 (#13000206)	6909 Efland-Cedar Grove Rd. 36°11′53″N 79°10′09″W	Cedar Grove	
47	Ridge Road School		December 12, 2023 (#100009620)	2705 Coleman Loop Road; 36°07′43″N 79°07′13″W	Hillsborough vicinity	
48	Rigsbee's Rock House	Rigsbee's Rock House	October 20, 1988 (#88002026)	Jct. of Lawrence Rd. and US 70W Bypass; 36°03′34″N 79°04′01″W	Hillsborough	
49	Rocky Ridge Farm Historic District	Rocky Ridge Farm Historic District	August 8, 1989 (#89001039)	Roughly bounded by Rocky Ridge Rd., Country Club Rd., Laurel Hill Rd., Laurel Hill Cir., and Buttons Dr.; also portions of Country Club Rd., Laurel Hill Rd., and Ledge Ln., and all of Round Hill Rd. 35°54′21″N 79°02′18″W	Chapel Hill	Second set of boundaries represents a boundary increase of January 30, 2008
50	Ruffin-Roulhac House	Ruffin-Roulhac House	August 5, 1971 (#71000612)	Churton and Orange Sts. 36°04′54″N 79°05′58″W	Hillsborough	
51	Sans Souci	Sans Souci	August 26, 1971 (#71000613)	E. Corbin St. 36°04′56″N 79°05′37″W	Hillsborough	
52	St. Mary's Chapel	St. Mary's Chapel	July 12, 1978 (#78001968)	NE of Hillsborough; 36°07′03″N 79°00′01″W	Hillsborough	
53	St. Matthew's Episcopal Church and Churchyard	St. Matthew's Episcopal Church and Churchyard	June 24, 1971 (#71000614)	St. Mary's Rd. 36°04′35″N 79°05′43″W	Hillsborough	
54	Schley Grange Hall	Schley Grange Hall	April 23, 2020 (#100005203)	3416 Schley Rd. 36°09′12″N 79°03′48″W	Schley	
55	Toney and Nellie Strayhorn House		May 26, 2026 (#100013047)	109 Jones Ferry Road; 35°54′35″N 79°04′34″W	Carrboro	
56	West Chapel Hill Historic District	West Chapel Hill Historic District	December 31, 1998 (#98001528)	Roughly bounded by W. Cameron Ave., Malette St., Ranson St., Pittsboro St., University Dr. and the Westwood Subdivision; also roughly bounded by W. Franklin, S. Columbia, and Pittsboro Sts., Brookside and Dogwood Drs., and the E end of McCauley St. and W. Patterson Pl., 35°54′23″N 79°03′31″W	Chapel Hill	Second set of addresses represent a boundary increase approved May 9, 2019

== See also ==
- National Register of Historic Places listings in North Carolina
- List of National Historic Landmarks in North Carolina
