= Jacob Jackson =

Jacob Jackson may refer to:

- Jacob B. Jackson
- Jacob Jackson Farm
- Jacob Jackson (soccer)
