= Dickerson Chapel =

Methodist chapel in Hillsborough, North Carolina

Coordinates: 36.07851°N 79.09926°W

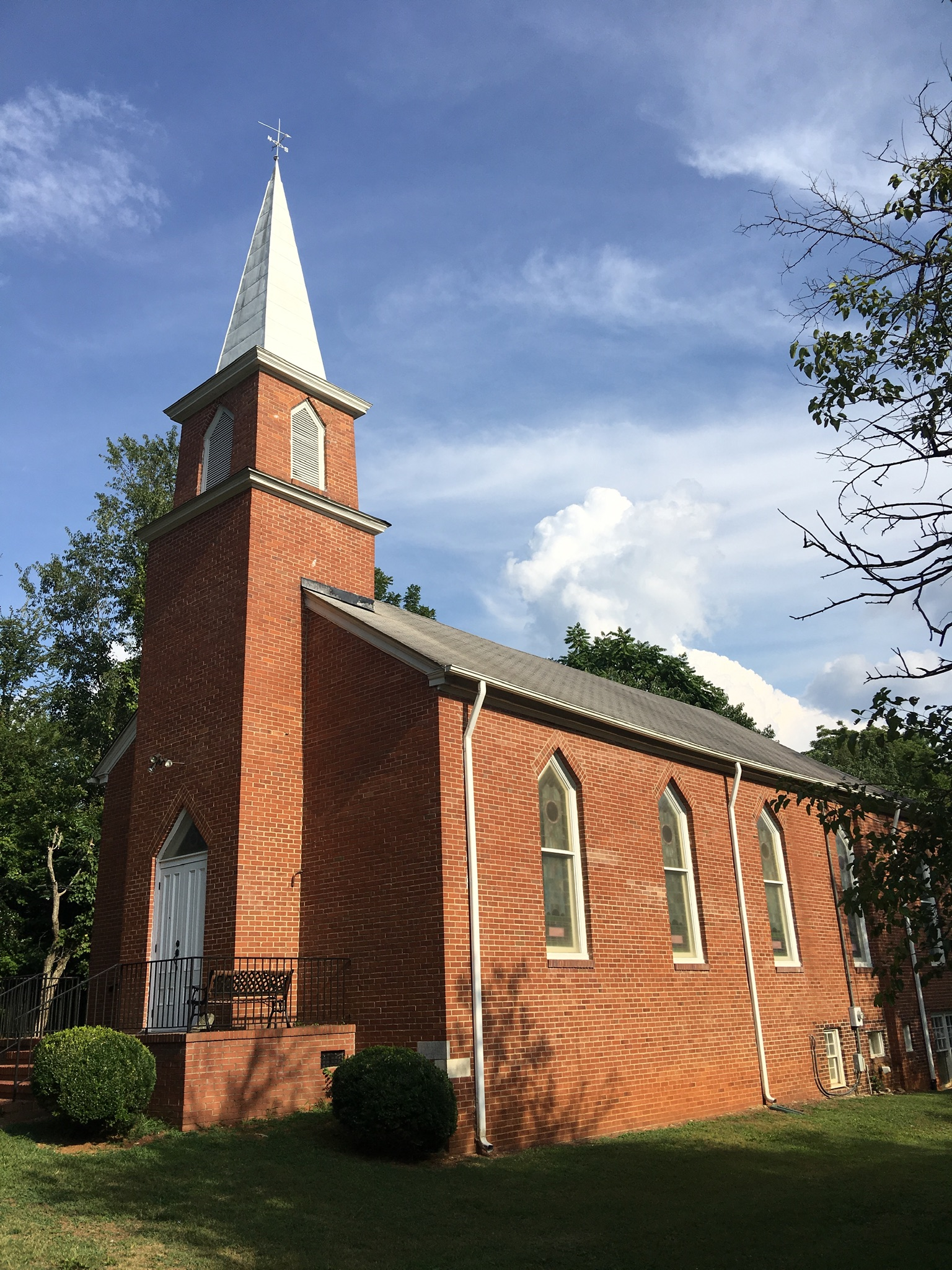
- Dickerson Chapel A.M.E. Church in 2019

Religion
- Affiliation: African Methodist Episcopal
- Status: Active

Location
- Location: 100 E Queen Street; Hillsborough, North Carolina
- Interactive map of Dickerson Chapel

Architecture
- Completed: 1790

Dickerson Chapel is a historic chapel in Hillsborough, North Carolina. Built in 1790, the chapel originally served as the courthouse for Orange County until 1844. It housed a Baptist congregation from 1845 until 1862, when it was purchased by a group of Quakers to serve as a school for African-American children. Since 1886 it has housed a congregation of the African Methodist Episcopal Church.

== History ==
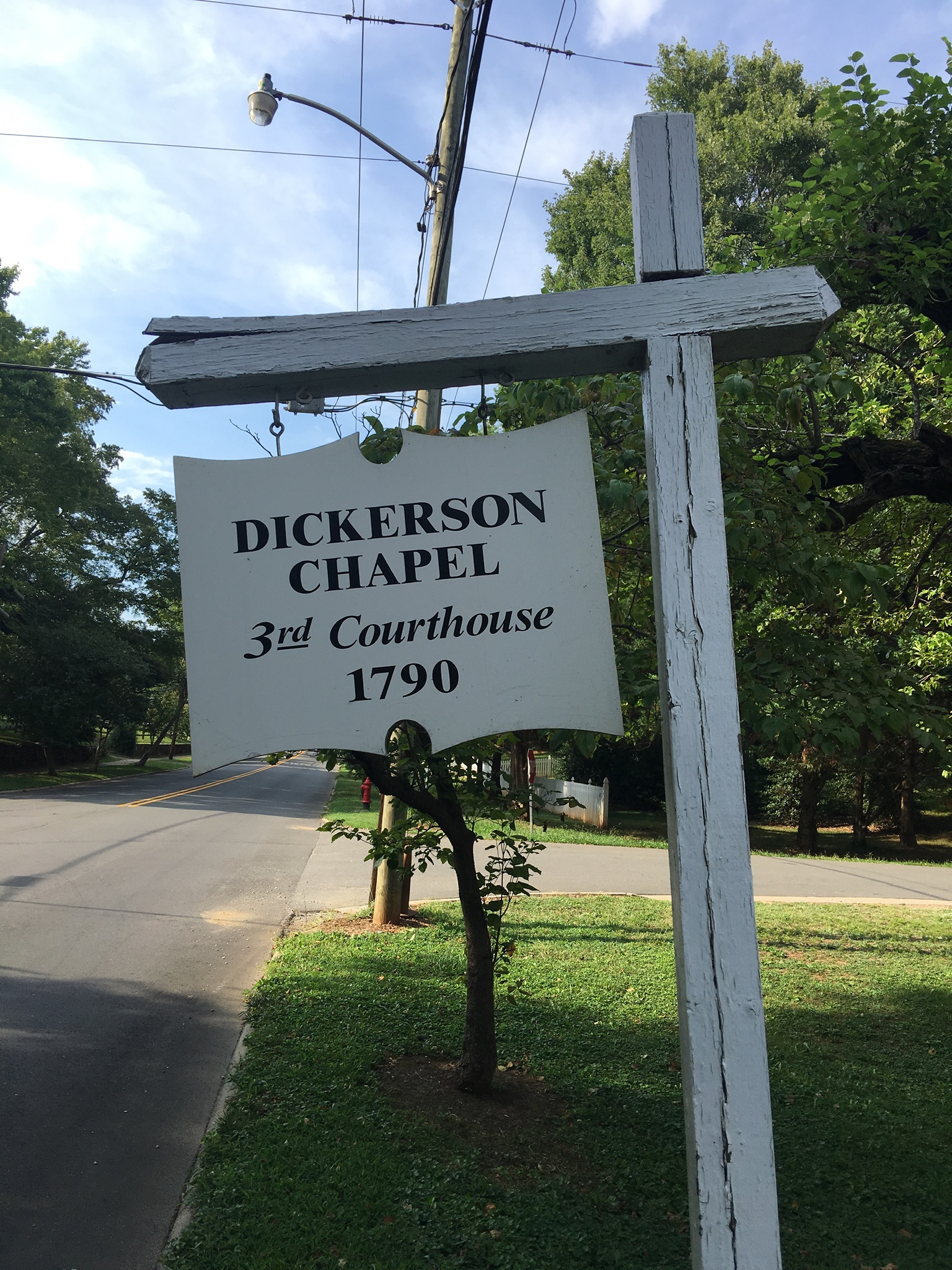

Dickerson Chapel was built in 1790 as the third courthouse for Orange County, North Carolina. It served as the county's courthouse until 1844, when the court relocated to what is known as the Old Courthouse. The building was located on the corner of Churton and King Streets in Hillsborough. In 1845, the courthouse was purchased by Rev. Elias Dodson, the first Baptist minister in Hillsborough. Dodson had the building relocated to its present site on the corner of Churton and Queen Streets and reopened it as the First Baptist Church of Hillsborough. It served as a Baptist church until 1862, when the property was purchased by three Quakers from Pennsylvania, who converted the building into a school for African-American children. In 1886 the chapel was given to trustees of the African Methodist Episcopal Church.
