= Harriet Morehead Berry =

American civic leader, suffragist and editor

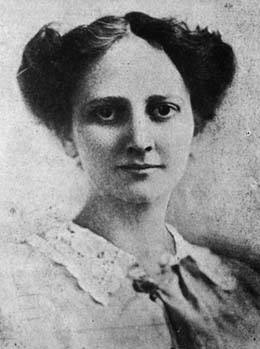
- Harriet Morehead Berry
- Born: July 22, 1877; Hillsborough, North Carolina, US
- Died: March 24, 1940 (aged 62)
- Burial place: Old Chapel Hill Cemetery
- Education: State Normal and Industrial School
- Occupations: civic leader, suffragist, editor
- Known for: active in the Good Roads Movement in North Carolina
- Notable work: supporter of women's suffrage, member of the Legislative Council of Women
- Awards: inducted into the North Carolina Transportation Hall of Fame (2004)

Harriet Morehead Berry (July 22, 1877 — March 24, 1940) was an American civic leader, suffragist, and editor, active in the Good Roads Movement in North Carolina.

== Early life and education ==
Harriet Morehead Berry was born in 1877 in Hillsborough, North Carolina, the daughter of Dr. John Berry and Mary Strayhorn Berry. Her sister Margaret Berry was the first woman to graduate from the University of North Carolina Law School in 1915. Her grandfather John Berry (1798–1870) was an architect and builder who served in the North Carolina legislature. Berry attended the Nash-Kollock School, and the State Normal and Industrial School, where she finished a degree in 1897.

== Career ==
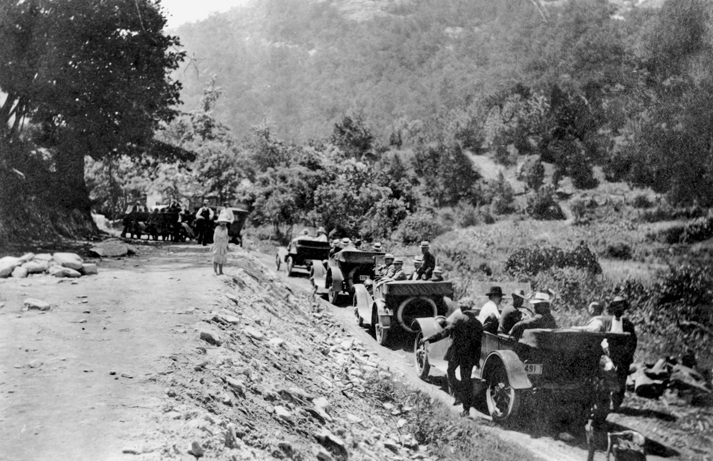
Good Roads Movement protest in North Carolina in 1916

Harriet Morehead taught at the Oxford Orphans Asylum for two years. She soon left teaching and trained as a stenographer. She worked for the North Carolina Geological and Economic Survey in Chapel Hill beginning in 1901. She became secretary to the survey in 1904. During World War I she was the acting director of the survey, while the state geologist Joseph Hyde Pratt was serving in the military.

From 1919 to 1921, Harriet Berry was head of the North Carolina Good Roads Association. She lectured across the state, gathering signatures, raising money, and building the organization's membership to over 5000 subscribers. Her efforts led to passage of laws creating the state highway commission and to modern construction methods for the state's highways.

In 1922, Berry became an editor at the Greensboro Daily News, covering "industries and resources." She became secretary of the North Carolina Credit Union Association in 1924, and a year later was working for the North Carolina Department of Agriculture as an editor and publicist. She was state superintendent of savings and loan associations from 1927 until she retired in 1937.

As a supporter of women's suffrage, she was a member of the Legislative Council of Women. She was head of the Chapel Hill Equal Suffrage League and on the executive board of the North Carolina Equal Suffrage League. She was a delegate to the Democratic National Convention in 1924.

== Personal life and legacy ==
Harriet Morehead Berry died in 1940, at the age of 62, after several years of heart trouble. Her remains were buried in the Old Chapel Hill Cemetery. Her papers are archived at the Southern Historical Collection in Chapel Hill.

In 2004, she was inducted into the North Carolina Transportation Hall of Fame. A section of Interstate 40 in North Carolina is designated the "Harriet Morehead Berry Freeway." There is a highway historical marker about Harriet M. Berry north of Chapel Hill. There is also a plaque at the State Highway Building that describes her as "the Mother of Good Roads in North Carolina."

Harriet Berry's 1914 bungalow in Chapel Hill is still standing in the town's Franklin-Rosemary Historic District.
