= Eagle Lodge =

- U.S. National Register of Historic Places
- U.S. Historic district – Contributing property
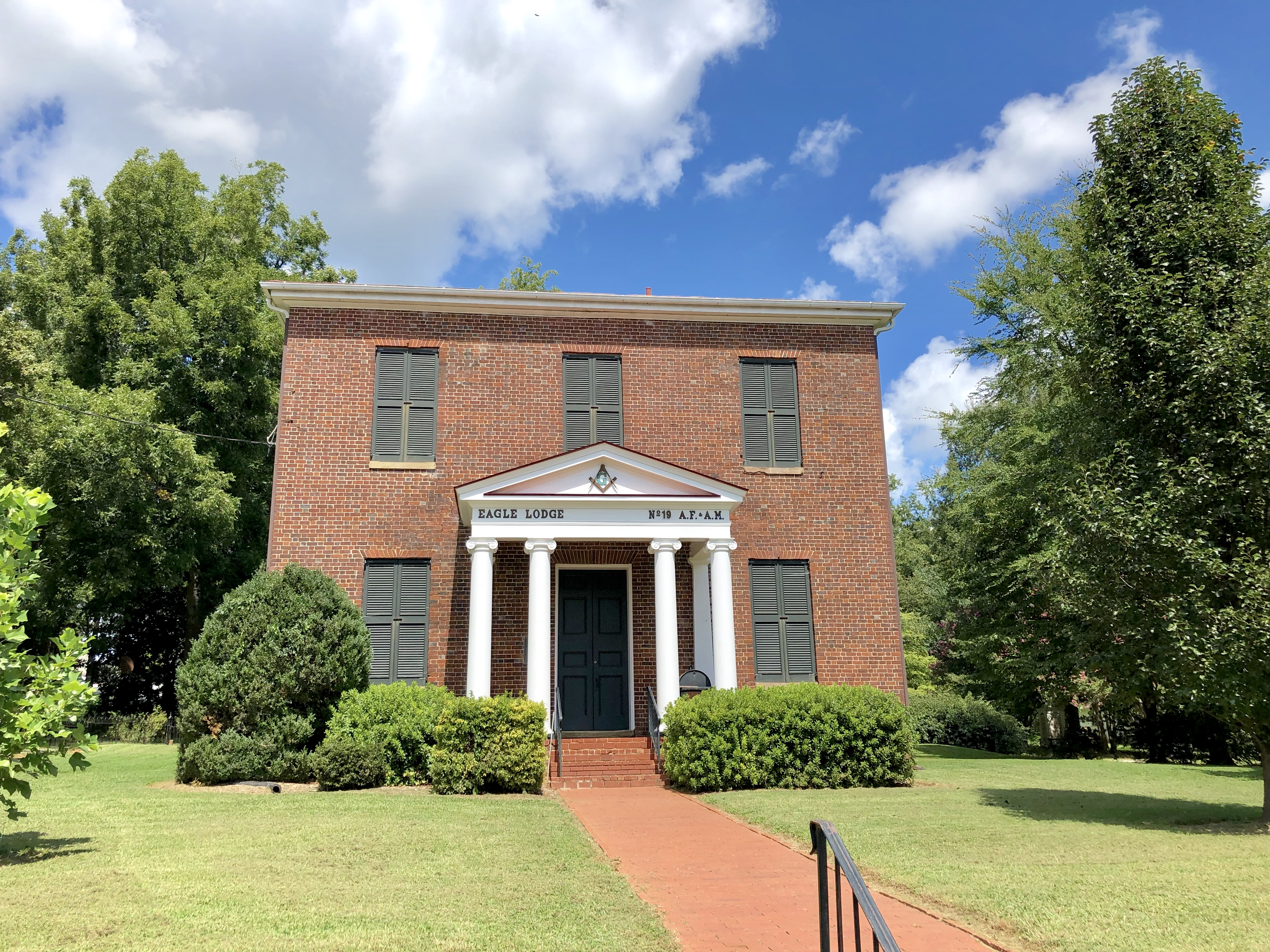
- Eagle Lodge, September 2019

- Location within North Carolina Location within the United States
- Location: 142 W. King St., Hillsborough, North Carolina
- Coordinates: 36°4′31″N 79°5′59″W
- Area: 1 acre (0.40 ha)
- Built: 1823
- Architect: William Nichols
- Architectural style: Greek Revival
- Part of: Hillsborough Historic District
- NRHP reference No.: 71000607
- Added to NRHP: April 16, 1971

Eagle Lodge is a historic Masonic lodge building located at Hillsborough, Orange County, North Carolina. It was built in 1823, and two-story, three-bay, square brick building in the Greek Revival style. Its brickwork is laid in Flemish bond. It has a low hipped roof with heavy box cornice and a one-story pedimented porch with Ionic order columns.

The Eagle Lodge was first chartered in 1791 and disbanded in 1799. It was re-started in 1819, and decided in 1820 to build a building. This was designed probably by North Carolina's state architect William Nichols.

It came to serve as the town's lecture hall, opera house, Civil War hospital, and other functions. It was also known as the King Street Opera House.

It was deemed architecturally significant "as an interesting example of the adaptive usage of early Greek Revival motifs in a building constructed specifically as a Masonic lodge."

It was listed on the National Register of Historic Places in 1971. It is located in the Hillsborough Historic District.
