= Ayr Mount =

Historic house in North Carolina, United States

- U.S. National Register of Historic Places
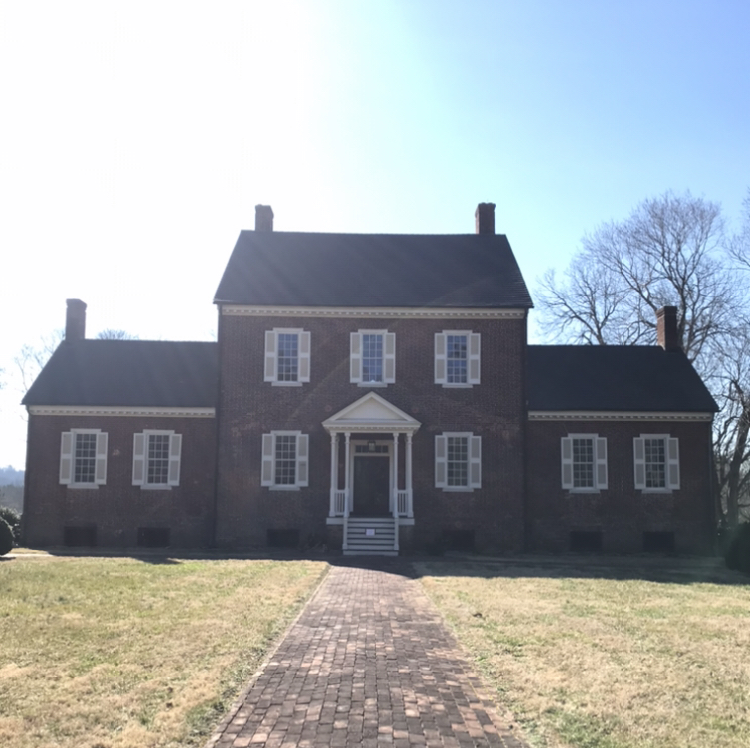
- Ayr Mount in 2021

- Location within North Carolina Location within the United States
- Location: St. Mary's Rd., Hillsborough, North Carolina
- Coordinates: 36°4′37″N 79°5′30″W
- Area: 8 acres (3.2 ha)
- Built: c. 1815
- Architectural style: Greek Revival
- NRHP reference No.: 71000606
- Added to NRHP: August 26, 1971

Ayr Mount is a Federal style plantation house located east of Hillsborough, in Orange County, North Carolina, the United States of America.

In 1799, William Kirkland (born in Ayr, Scotland) bought 500 acres (2.0 km^{2}) east of Hillsborough. Circa 1815, he had a home built for himself, his wife, Margaret, and their children, a brick dwelling with a two-story, three-bay main block flanked by one-story, two-bay wings. A full-width front porch, added about 1894, was removed sometime after 1971 and replaced with a facsimile of the original porch.

Mrs. Samuel (Emily) Kirkland, the last of four generations of Kirklands to occupy the house, lived there until 1985.

The property had gone through several owners prior to Kirkland's purchase of the property, the most well-known being William Few, Jr., whose father, William Few, Sr., had a house built on the property c. 1764.

Today, Ayr Mount is a publicly accessible historic site located on 265 acres (1.07 km^{2}). It is owned and operated by Classical American Homes Preservation Trust. The home has been furnished with Federal period antiques and decorative art, including some original Kirkland furnishings. Ayr Mount features guided house tours and the one-mile (1.6 km) hiking trail the "Poet's Walk."

Ayr Mount in History and Today

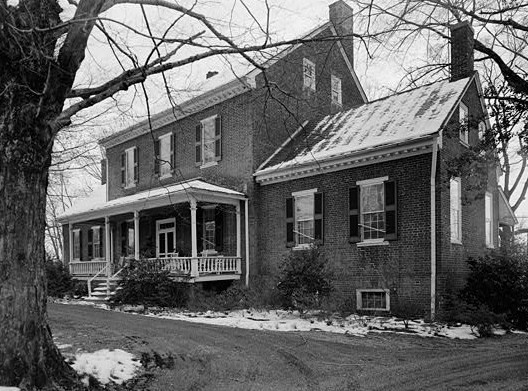
Ayr Mount in 1965

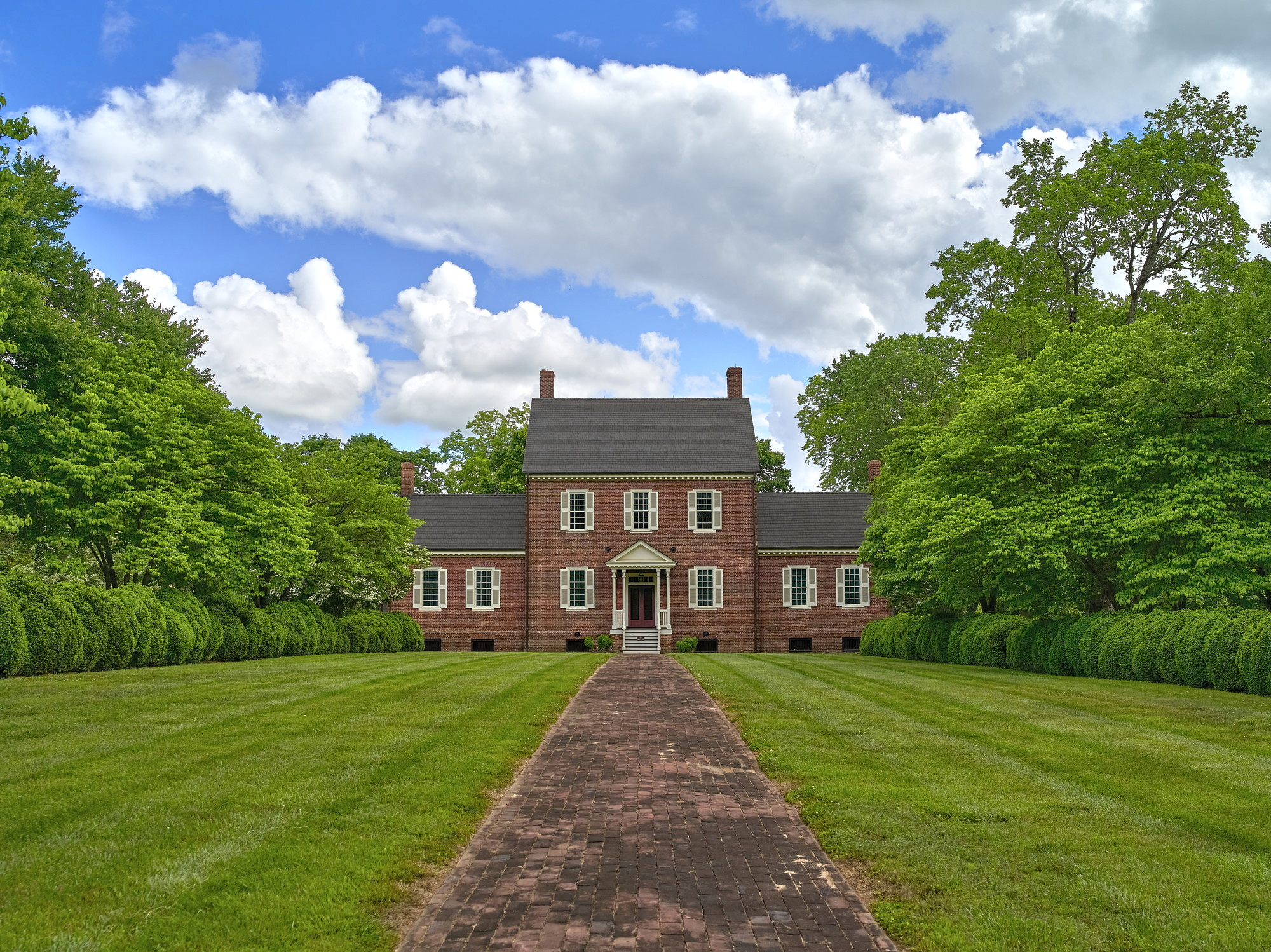
Ayr Mount in 2022 (Front)

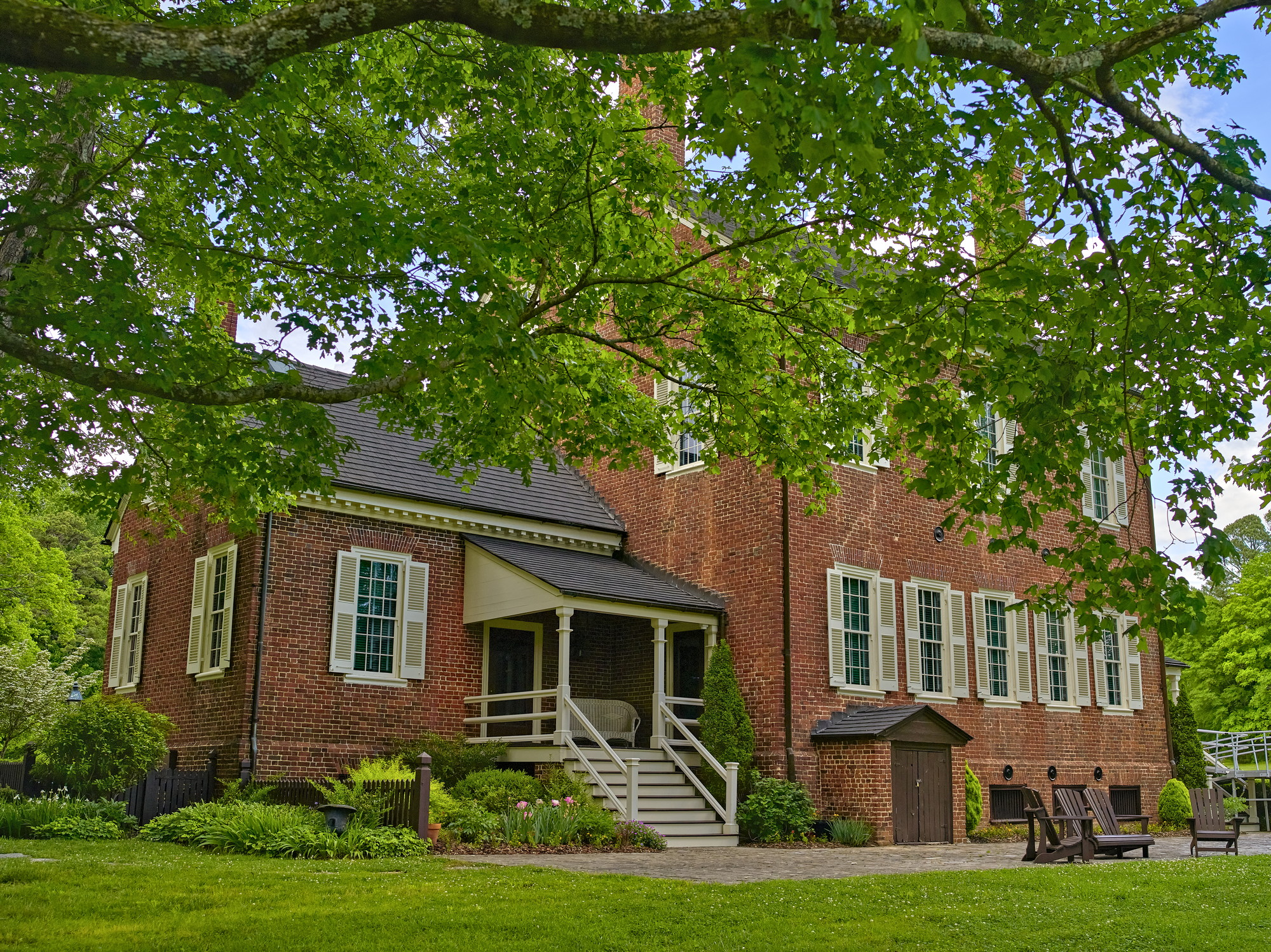
Ayr Mount in 2022 (Back)
