= Faucett Mill and House =

Historic buildings in North Carolina, United States

- U.S. National Register of Historic Places
- U.S. Historic district
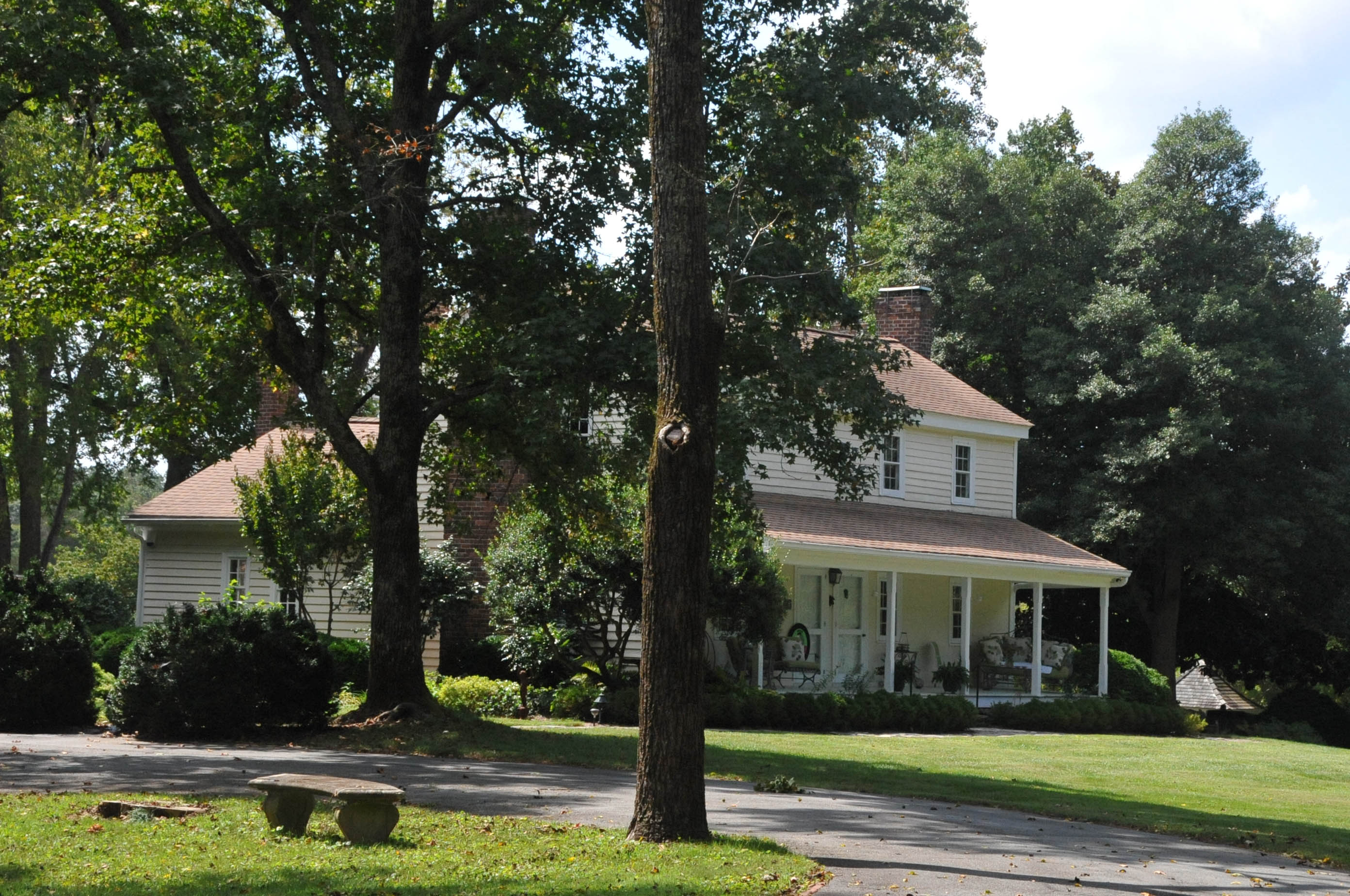
- Faucett House, March 2007

- Location within North Carolina Location within the United States
- Location: Faucette Mill Rd. on the E side of Eno River, near Hillsborough, North Carolina
- Coordinates: 36°06′04″N 79°08′25″W
- Area: 67 acres (27 ha)
- Built: 1808
- Architectural style: Federal
- NRHP reference No.: 88001175
- Added to NRHP: August 4, 1988

Faucett Mill and House, also known as Coach House and Chatwood, is a historic grist mill, home, and national historic district located near Hillsborough, Orange County, North Carolina. The mill was built before 1792, and is a 2 1/2-story, heavy timber frame, weatherboarded building. It is sided alongside a reconstructed mill race and the Eno River. The Faucett House was built about 1808, and is a 2 1/2-story, Federal style frame dwelling, with an original one-story rear wing. The house's southwest wing was originally a separate dwelling known as the Naile Johnson House. It was added to the Faucett House about 1938. Also on the property are the contributing mill cottage, barn, and a section of the "Great Road."

It was listed on the National Register of Historic Places in 1988.
