= Cabe-Pratt-Harris House =

Historic house in North Carolina, United States

- U.S. National Register of Historic Places
- Location within North Carolina Location within the United States
- Location: NC 1567. 0.9 miles N. of Eno River Bridge, near Hillsborough, North Carolina
- Coordinates: 36°3′29″N 79°0′28″W
- Area: 27.3 acres (11.0 ha)
- Built: c. 1820
- Architectural style: Georgian
- NRHP reference No.: 99000481
- Added to NRHP: April 22, 1999

Cabe-Pratt-Harris House, also known as Riverland Farm, is a historic home located near Hillsborough, Orange County, North Carolina. It was built about 1820, and is a 1 1/2-story, Late Georgian style frame dwelling with a gable roof. It sits on a raised fieldstone foundation and has flanking stone chimneys with brick stacks. It has a rear addition built in the 1940s, and was renovated in the 1980s.

It was listed on the National Register of Historic Places in 1999.
