= Moorefields =

Historic house in North Carolina, United States

- U.S. National Register of Historic Places
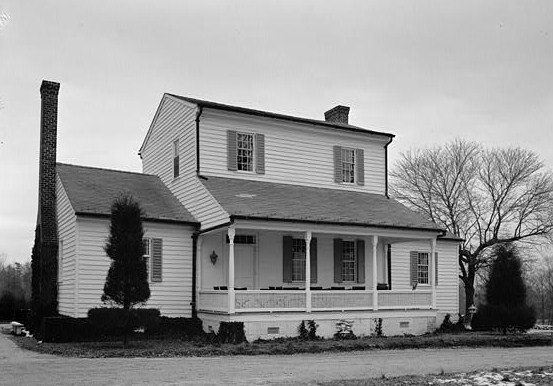
- Moorefields, HABS photo, February 1965

- Location within North Carolina Location within the United States
- Location: N of jct. of SR 1134 and 1135, near Hillsborough, North Carolina
- Coordinates: 36°3′39.7″N 79°8′36.1″W
- Area: 8.3 acres (3.4 ha)
- Built: 1785
- Architectural style: Federal
- NRHP reference No.: 72000982
- Added to NRHP: April 25, 1972

Moorefields is a historic plantation home located near Hillsborough, Orange County, North Carolina. It was built about 1785, and consists of a two-story central block, three bays wide, with flanking one-bay wings in the Federal style. The house features a shed porch with turned wooden posts. It was built by soldier and judge Alfred Moore (1755-1810).

It was listed on the National Register of Historic Places in 1972.
