= Hillsborough Historic District =

Historic district in North Carolina, United States

- U.S. National Register of Historic Places
- U.S. Historic district
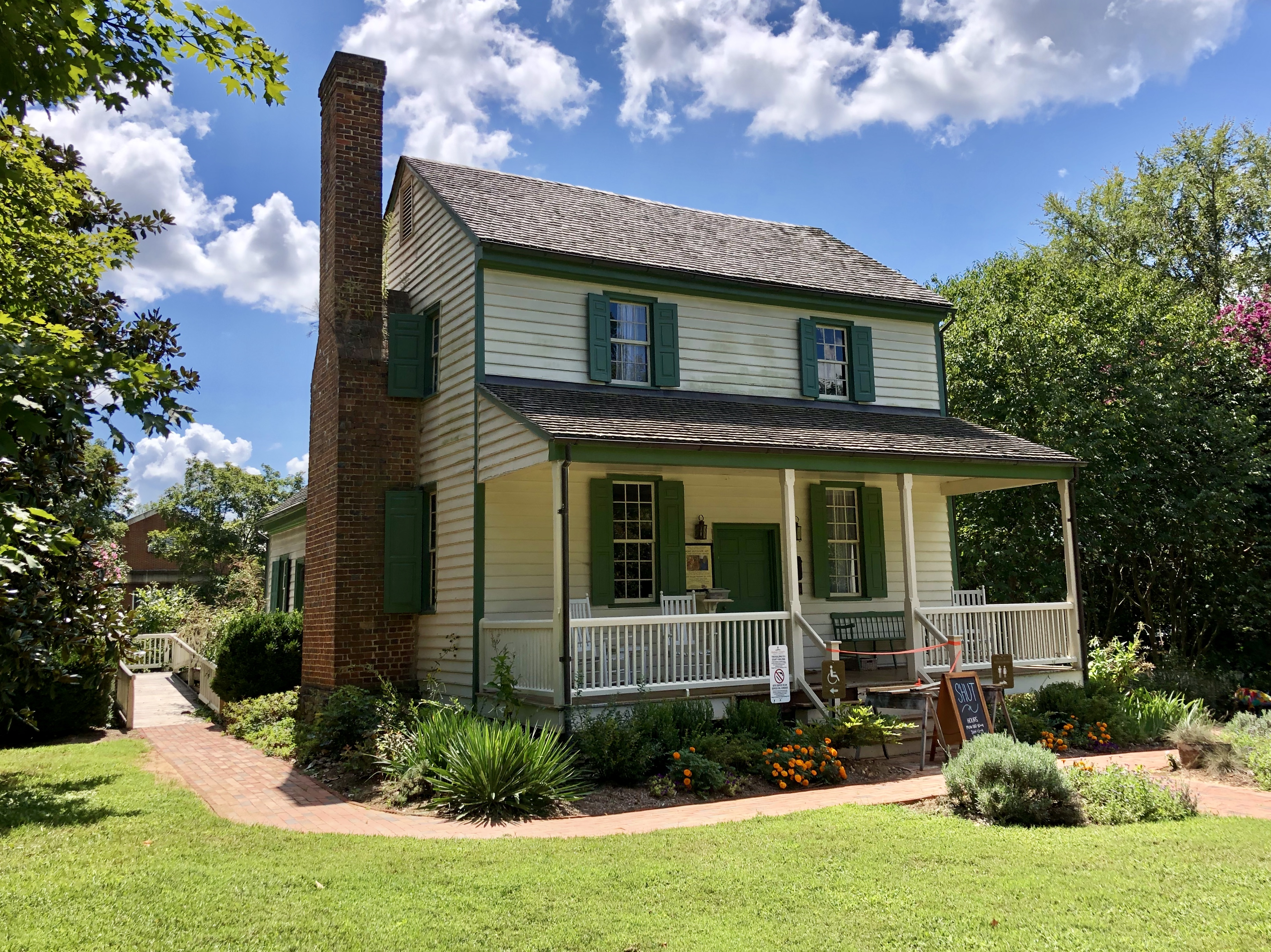
- Alexander Dickson House, A Contributing Structure

- Location within North Carolina Location within the United States
- Location: Roughly bounded by N. Nash and W. Corbin Sts., Highland Loop Rd., and Eno River, Hillsborough, North Carolina
- Coordinates: 36°4′25″N 79°5′44″W
- Area: 1,265 acres (512 ha)
- Built: 1701
- Architect: Multiple
- Architectural style: Greek Revival, Italianate, Federal
- NRHP reference No.: 73001363
- Added to NRHP: October 15, 1973

Hillsborough Historic District is a national historic district located at Hillsborough, Orange County, North Carolina. The district encompasses 529 contributing buildings, 9 contributing sites, 13 contributing structures, and 2 contributing objects in the central business district and surrounding residential sections of Hillsborough. The district includes buildings dating to the late-18th and early-20th century and includes notable examples of Federal, Greek Revival, and Italianate style architecture. Located in the district are the separately listed Burwell School, Eagle Lodge, Hazel-Nash House, Heartsease, Montrose, Nash Law Office, Nash-Hooper House, Old Orange County Courthouse, Poplar Hill, Ruffin-Roulhac House, Sans Souci, and St. Matthew's Episcopal Church and Churchyard. Other notable buildings include Seven Hearths, Hillsborough Presbyterian Church (1815-1816), Methodist Church (1859-1860), First Baptist Church (1862-1870), Twin Chimneys, and the Berry Brick House.

It was listed on the National Register of Historic Places (NRHP) in 1973.
