= Old Orange County Courthouse (North Carolina) =

Historic courthouse in North Carolina, US

- U.S. National Register of Historic Places
- U.S. Historic district – Contributing property
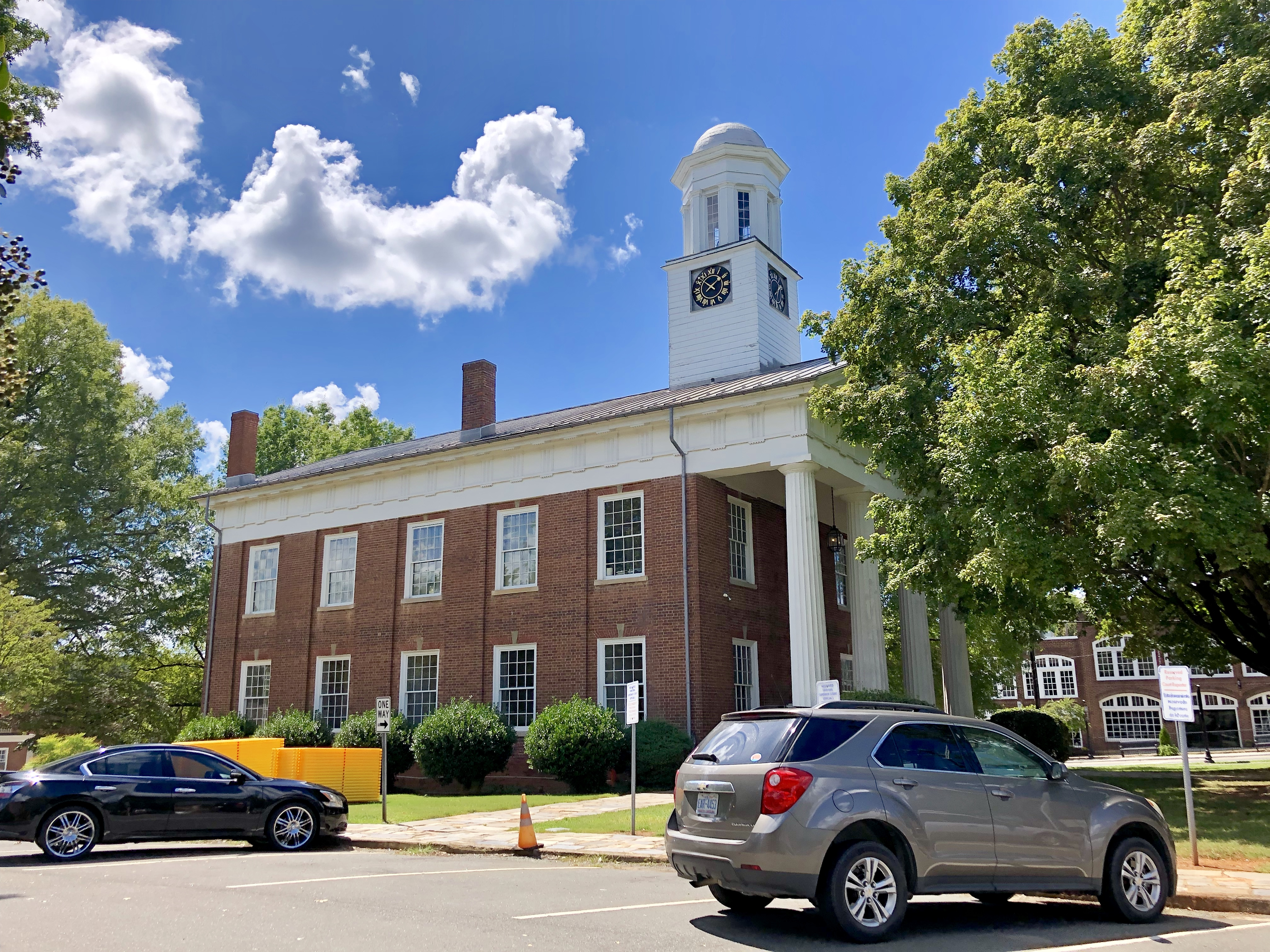
- Old Orange County Courthouse, September 2019

- Location within North Carolina Location within the United States
- Location: 106 E. King St., Hillsborough, North Carolina
- Coordinates: 36°5′34″N 79°5′56″W
- Area: 0.5 acres (0.20 ha)
- Built: 1845
- Built by: Capt. John Berry
- Architectural style: Greek Revival
- NRHP reference No.: 71000611
- Added to NRHP: June 24, 1971

Old Orange County Courthouse is a historic courthouse building located at Hillsborough, Orange County, North Carolina. It was built in 1845, and is a two-story, Greek Revival-style, temple-form brick structure. It replaced Dickerson Chapel as the county's courthouse. The front facade features a Doric order tetrastyle pedimented portico and two-stage clock tower. The brickwork is laid in Flemish bond. The building served as the seat of Orange County's government until 1954, when a new building was completed.

It was listed on the National Register of Historic Places in 1971. It is located in the Hillsborough Historic District.

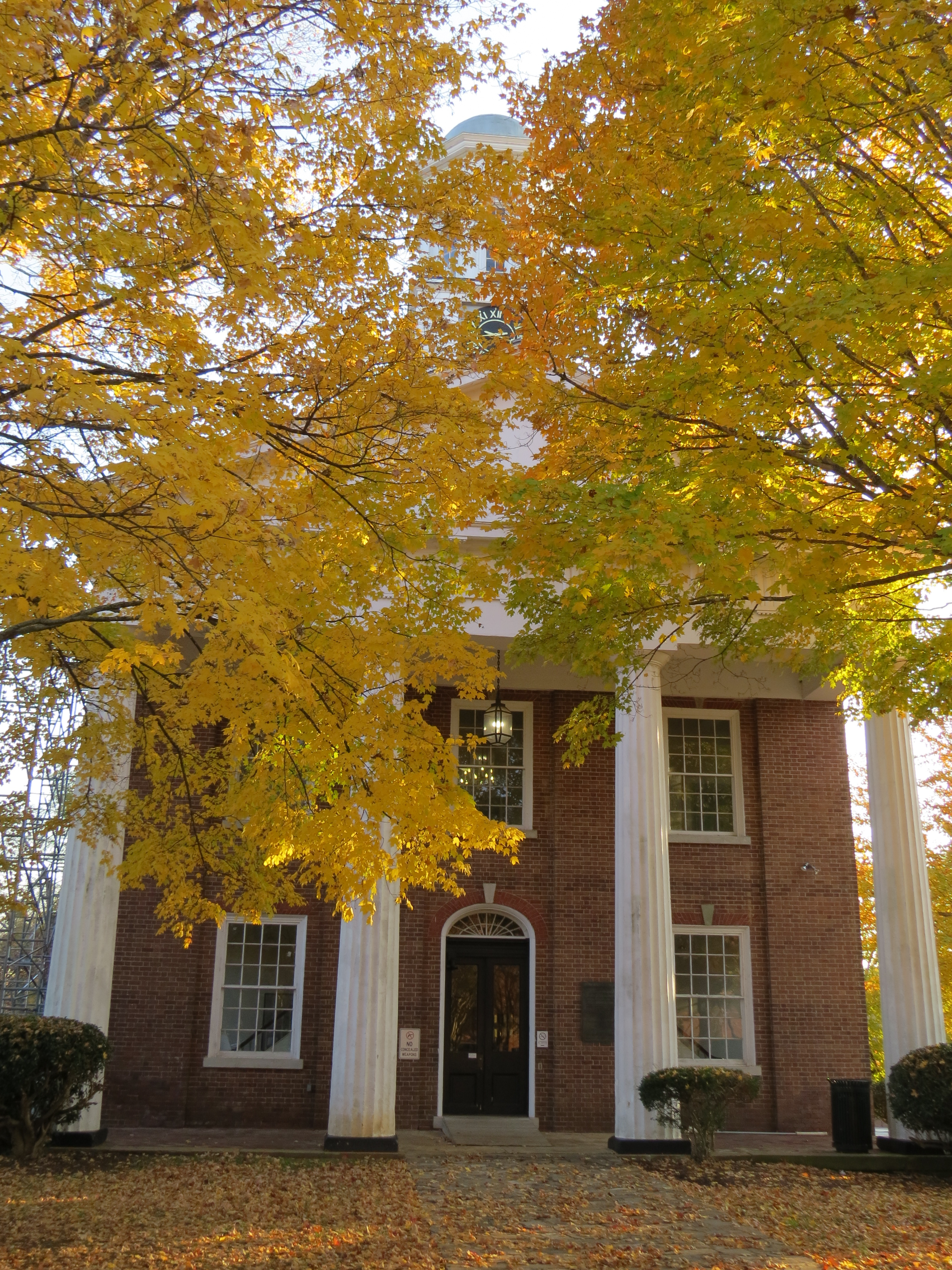
Old Orange County Courthouse
