= Sans Souci (Hillsborough, North Carolina) =

Historic house in North Carolina, United States

- U.S. National Register of Historic Places
- U.S. Historic district – Contributing property
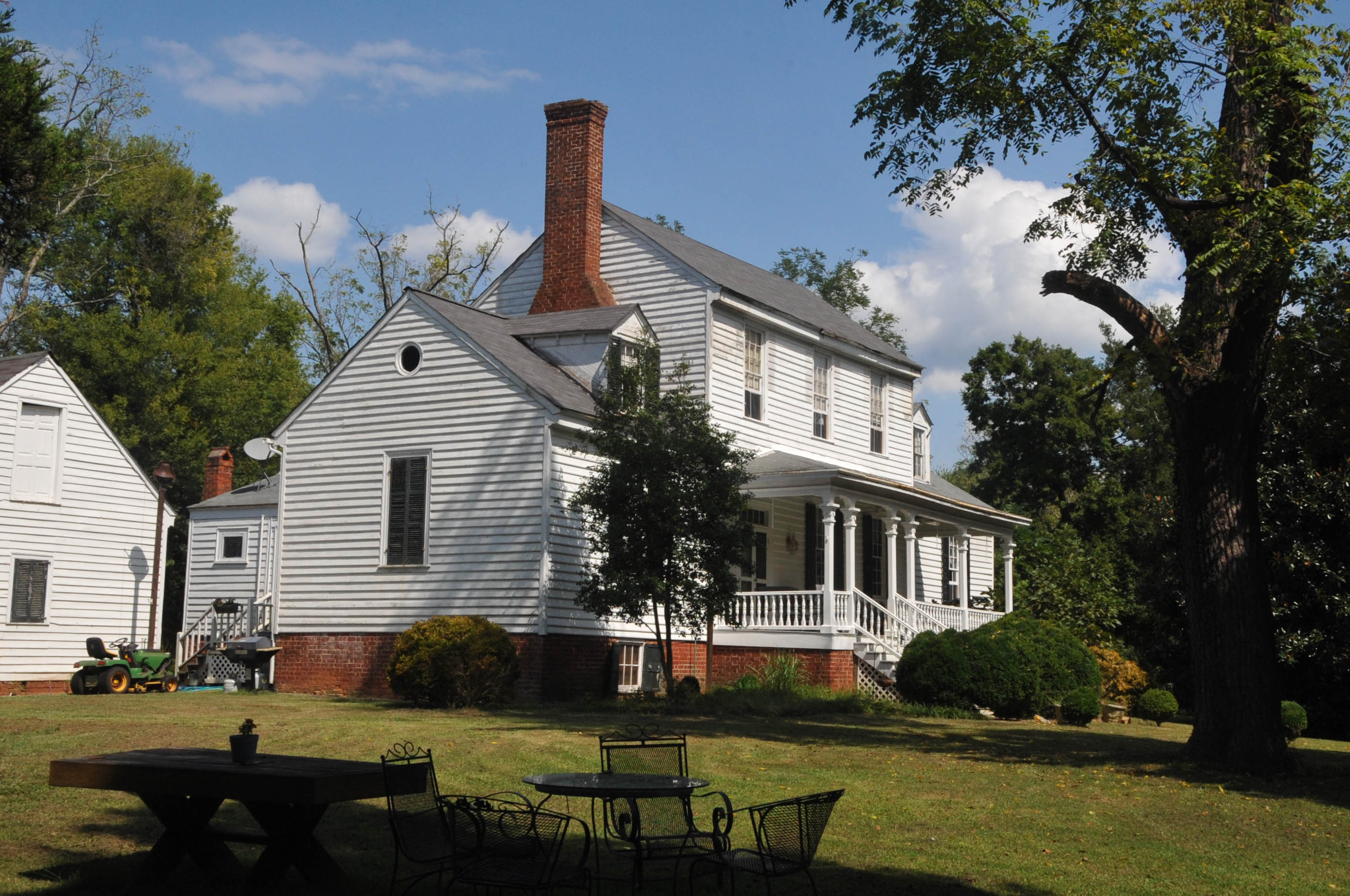
- Sans Souci, March 2007

- Location within North Carolina Location within the United States
- Location: E. Corbin St., Hillsborough, North Carolina
- Coordinates: 36°4′56″N 79°5′37″W
- Area: 3 acres (1.2 ha)
- Built: 1813
- Architectural style: Greek Revival, Federal
- NRHP reference No.: 71000613
- Added to NRHP: August 26, 1971

Sans Souci is a historic home located at Hillsborough, Orange County, North Carolina. It was built about 1813, as two-story, three-bay, frame dwelling with a gable roof and set on a brick foundation. Later additions included 1 1/2-story flanking wings added in the Federal period and a Greek Revival shed addition built in the mid-19th century across the rear of the main block and the east wing. Also on the property are the contributing kitchen, office, and servant's quarters.

It was listed on the National Register of Historic Places in 1971. It is located in the Hillsborough Historic District.
