= Eno Cotton Mill =

- U.S. National Register of Historic Places
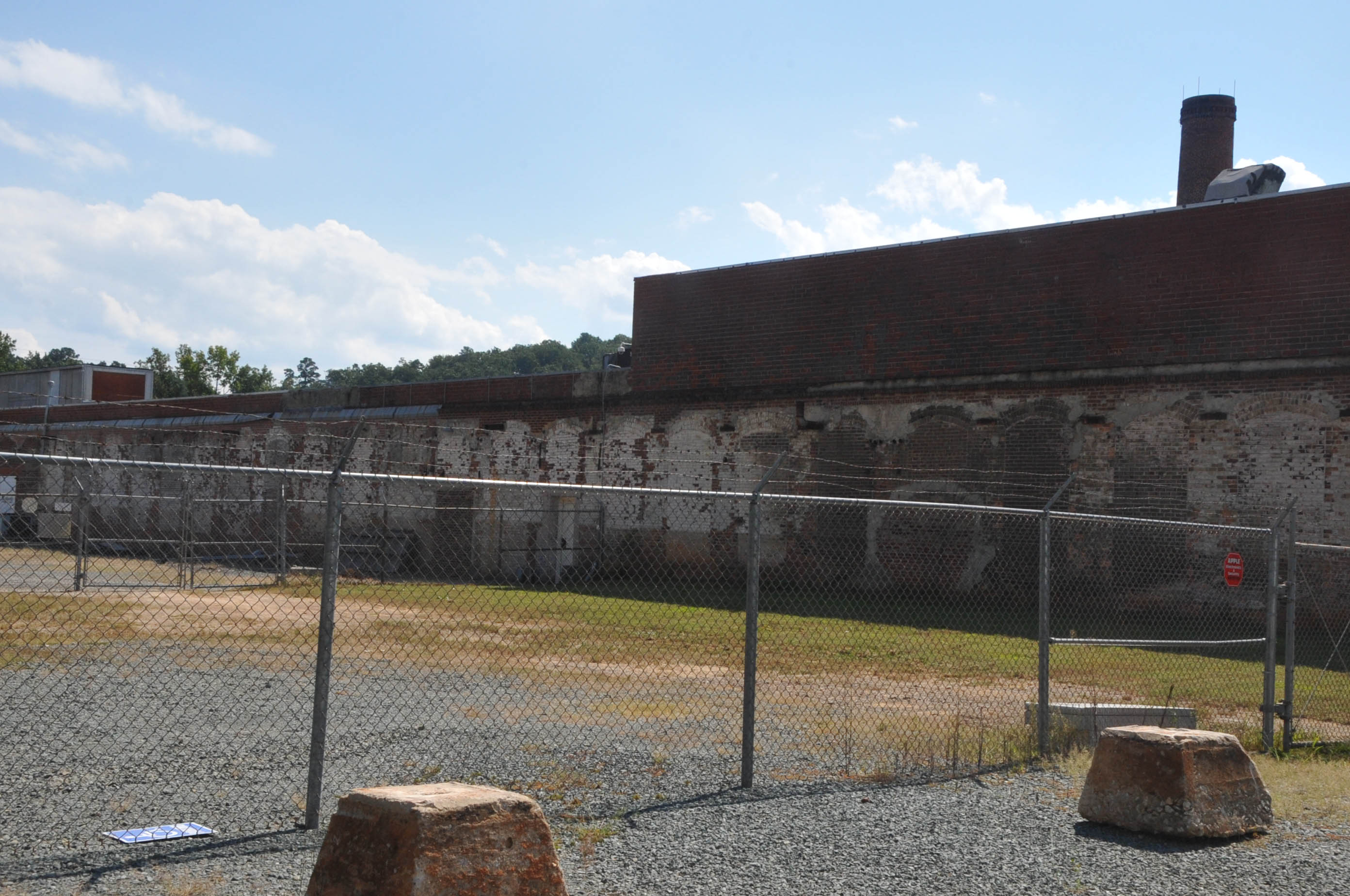
- Eno Cotton Mill, March 2007

- Location within North Carolina Location within the United States
- Location: 437 Dimmocks Mill Rd., Hillsborough, North Carolina
- Coordinates: 36°4′14″N 79°6′48″W
- Area: 17.587 acres (7.117 ha)
- Built: 1896, 1904, 1908, 1917, 1923
- Architectural style: Italianate
- NRHP reference No.: 11000622
- Added to NRHP: September 1, 2011

Eno Cotton Mill, also known as the Eno Plant, is a historic cotton mill complex located at Hillsborough, Orange County, North Carolina. The main mill was built in 1896, with expansions in 1904, about 1917, about 1923, and about 1971. The main mill is a two-story, brick building with a shallow gabled roof supported by heavy timber beams and posts. It is representative of slow-burn heavy timber construction and has Italianate style design elements. Also on the property are the contributing weave house and dye shed (1908, 1923) and steam stack (1896). Eno Plant closed in 1984 and the buildings house the Hillsborough Business Center incubator.

It was listed on the National Register of Historic Places in 2011.
