= Holden–Roberts Farm =

Historic farm in North Carolina, United States

- U.S. National Register of Historic Places
- U.S. Historic district
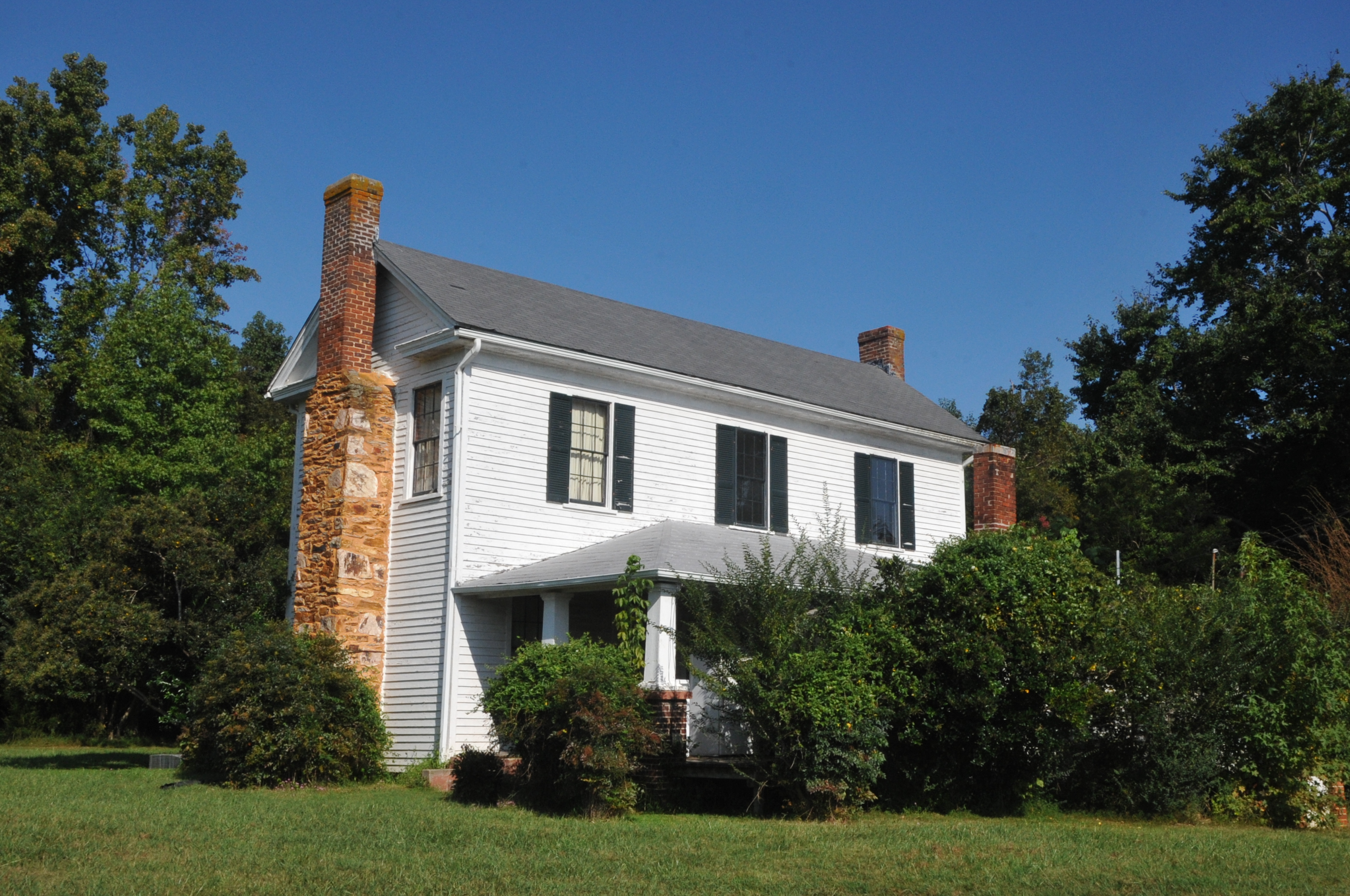
- Holden–Roberts farmhouse, March 2007

- Location within North Carolina Location within the United States
- Location: NC 1002, 1 miles E of NC 1538, near Hillsborough, North Carolina
- Coordinates: 36°06′36″N 79°02′11″W
- Area: 68.7 acres (27.8 ha)
- Built: 1873-1874
- Architectural style: tri-gable I house
- NRHP reference No.: 02000436
- Added to NRHP: May 2, 2002

Holden–Roberts Farm, also known as Rolling Acres Farm, is a historic home and farm and national historic district located near Hillsborough, Orange County, North Carolina. The farmhouse was built in 1873–1874, and is a two-story, frame I-house, with modest Greek Revival style detailing. The house is sheathed in weatherboard, has a gable roof, and features two stately single-shouldered end chimneys. Also on the property are the contributing granary (c. 1900), three frame chicken houses (c. 1910), a brick shed-roofed garden house (c. 1915), an equipment shed (c. 1930), and two pole barns (c. 1950). The house was built for Addison Holden, half-brother of North Carolina's Reconstruction Governor William Woods Holden.

It was listed on the National Register of Historic Places in 2002.
