= Rigsbee's Rock House =

Historic house in North Carolina, United States

- U.S. National Register of Historic Places
- U.S. Historic district
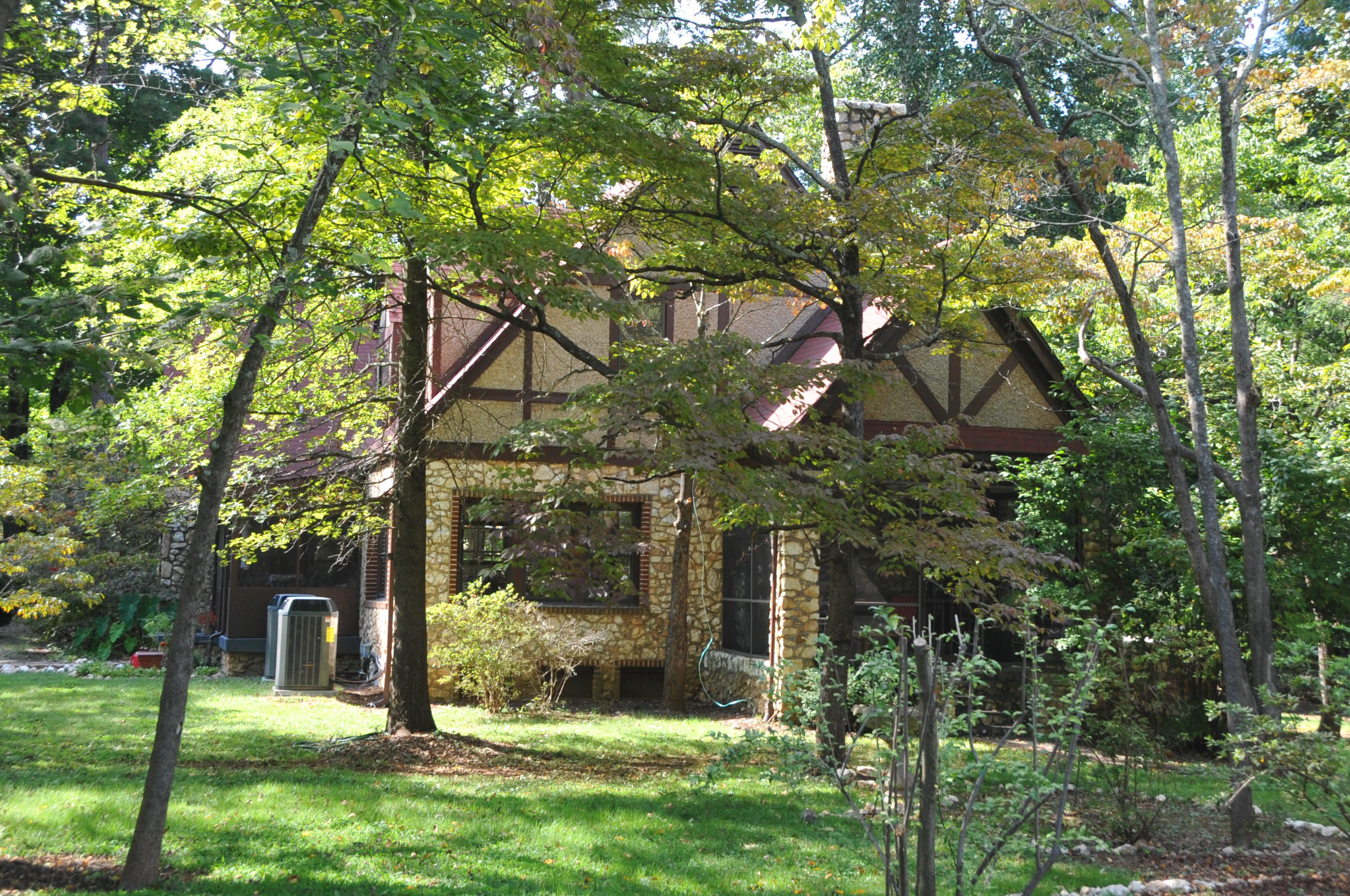
- Rigsbee's Rock House, March 2007

- Location within North Carolina Location within the United States
- Location: Jct. of Lawrence Rd. and US 70W Bypass, near Hillsborough, North Carolina
- Coordinates: 36°3′34″N 79°4′1″W
- Area: 1.8 acres (0.73 ha)
- Built: 1929
- Architectural style: Tudor Revival
- NRHP reference No.: 88002026
- Added to NRHP: October 20, 1988

Rigsbee's Rock House is a historic home and national historic district located near Hillsborough, Orange County, North Carolina. The house was built in 1929, and is a 1 1/2-story, rectangular, white flint rubble dwelling with a steeply pitched hipped roof in the Tudor Revival style. The house was restored in 1986–1987. Also on the property are the contributing original two car, detached garage, a pump house, and an outdoor swimming pool, each constructed of white flint rock.

It was listed on the National Register of Historic Places in 1988.
