= Hazel-Nash House =

Historic house in North Carolina, United States

- U.S. National Register of Historic Places
- U.S. Historic district – Contributing property
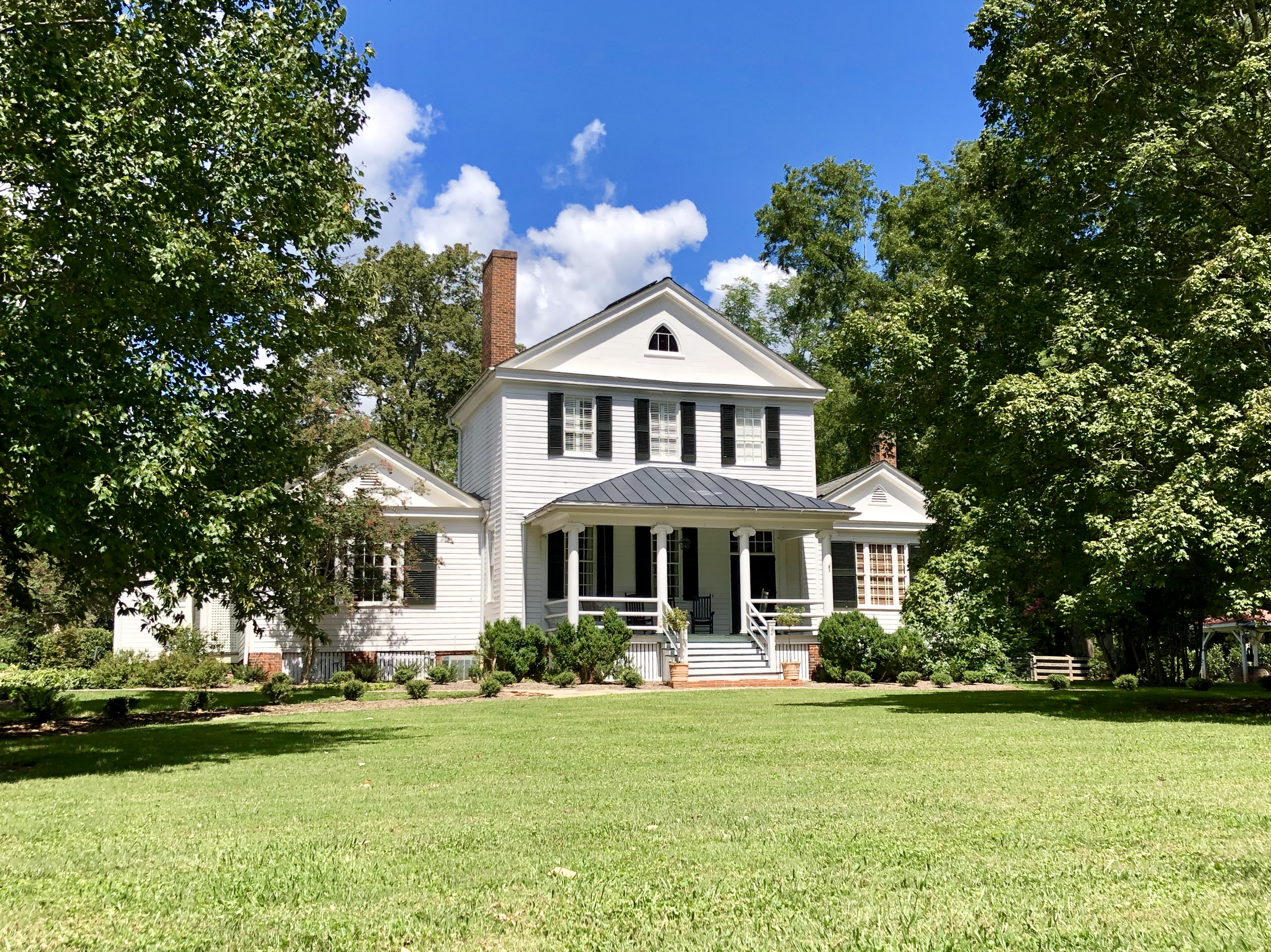
- Hasell-Nash House, September 2019

- Location within North Carolina Location within the United States
- Location: 116 W. Queen St., Hillsborough, North Carolina
- Coordinates: 36°4′44″N 79°6′4″W
- Area: 0.5 acres (0.20 ha)
- Built: c. 1820
- NRHP reference No.: 71000608
- Added to NRHP: March 31, 1971

Hazel-Nash House, also known as the Hasell-Nash House, is a historic home located at Hillsborough, Orange County, North Carolina. It was built about 1820, and consists of a two-story, three-bay, pedimented central block flanked by a pair of pedimented single-story wings. The front facade features a single-story porch supported by Ionic order columns and a central Palladian window. Its design is probably based on Robert Morris (1703–1754) plate 37 of his Rural Architecture. (London, 1750).

It was listed on the National Register of Historic Places in 1971. It is located in the Hillsborough Historic District.
