= St. Mary's Chapel (Hillsborough, North Carolina) =

- U.S. National Register of Historic Places
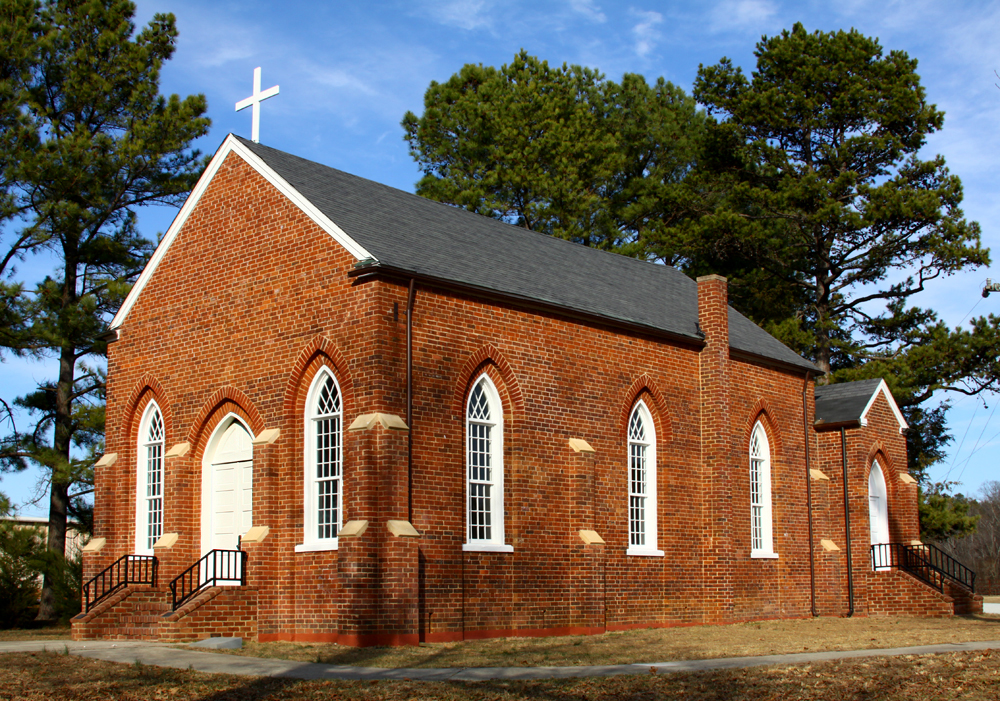

- Location within North Carolina Location within the United States
- Location: NE of Hillsborough, near Hillsborough, North Carolina
- Coordinates: 36°7′3″N 79°0′1″W
- Area: 5 acres (2.0 ha)
- Built: 1858-1859
- Architectural style: Gothic Revival
- NRHP reference No.: 78001968
- Added to NRHP: July 12, 1978

St. Mary's Chapel is a historic Episcopal chapel located near Hillsborough, Orange County, North Carolina. The congregation was established in 1759 by Anglicans, and united with the Episcopal Church of North Carolina in 1819. The Gothic Revival style brick church building was constructed in 1858-59 and the adjacent cemetery contains graves dating to the 1700s.

The property was listed on the National Register of Historic Places in 1978.
