= Ruffin-Roulhac House =

Historic house in North Carolina, United States

- U.S. National Register of Historic Places
- U.S. Historic district – Contributing property
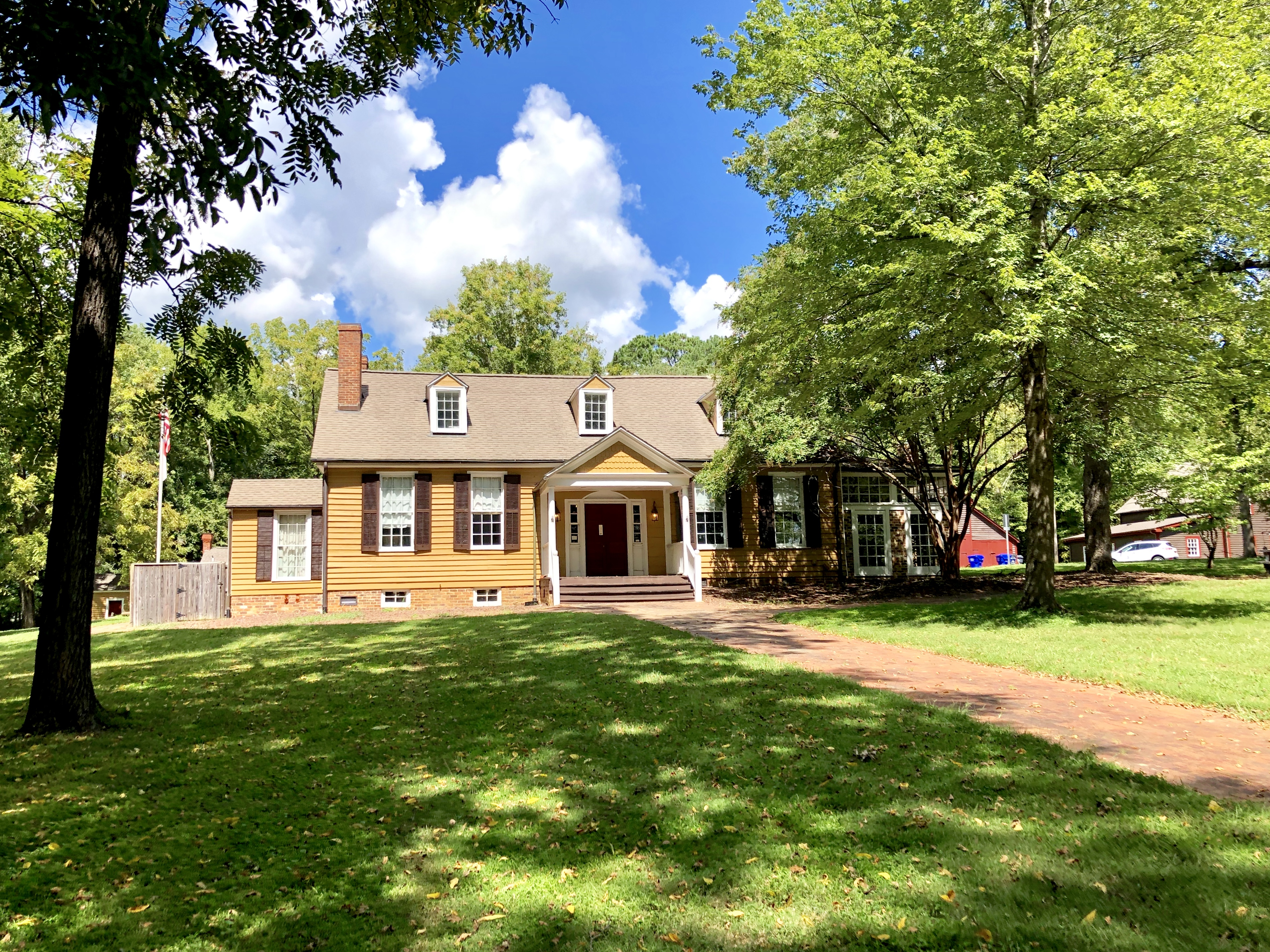
- Ruffin House, September 2019

- Location within North Carolina Location within the United States
- Location: Churton and Orange Sts., Hillsborough, North Carolina
- Coordinates: 36.081894°N 79.099050°W
- Area: 5 acres (2.0 ha)
- Built: 1820
- Architectural style: Greek Revival, Federal, Transitional
- NRHP reference No.: 71000612
- Added to NRHP: August 5, 1971

Ruffin-Roulhac House, also known as Little Hawfields, is a historic home located at Hillsborough, Orange County, North Carolina, United States. It was built about 1820, and is a 1 1/2-story, five-bay, frame dwelling including a two-room addition built about 1830. It is topped by a gable roof, is sheathed in weatherboard, and has a one-bay 20th century replacement porch. The interior has Federal, Greek Revival, and Victorian style design elements. It was the home of jurist Thomas Ruffin (1787–1870) from after the end of the American Civil War until his death in 1870.

The house has since been converted into town offices for the town of Hillsborough.

It was listed on the National Register of Historic Places in 1971. It is located in the Hillsborough Historic District.
