= Heartsease (Hillsborough, North Carolina) =

Historic house in North Carolina, United States

- U.S. National Register of Historic Places
- U.S. Historic district – Contributing property
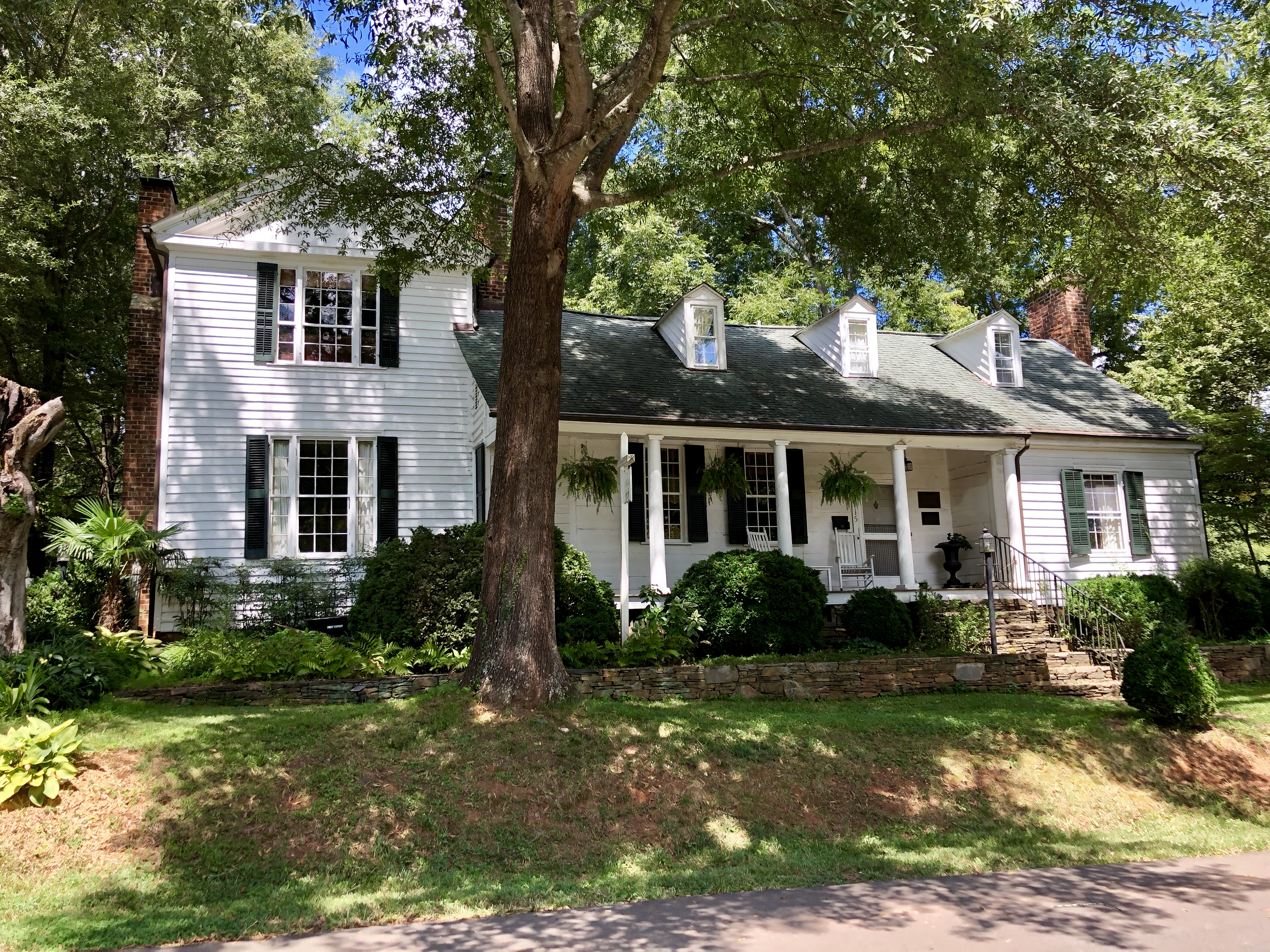
- Heartsease, September 2019

- Location within North Carolina Location within the United States
- Location: 113 E. Queen St., Hillsborough, North Carolina
- Coordinates: 36°4′44″N 79°6′7″W
- Area: less than one acre
- Built: 1820
- NRHP reference No.: 73001362
- Added to NRHP: April 11, 1973

Heartsease is a historic home located at Hillsborough, Orange County, North Carolina. It was built about 1770, and consists of a 1 1/2-story, three-bay, central block dating to the late 18th century, with an early 19th-century 1 1/2-story east wing, and two-story pedimented west wing added in the late 19th century. It is topped by a gable roof and features a shed porch whose roof supported by plain Tuscan order posts. It is believed that Heartsease served as the pre-Revolutionary home of Thomas Burke, North Carolina's third governor and a member of the Constitutional Convention.

It was listed on the National Register of Historic Places in 1973. It is located in the Hillsborough Historic District.
