= Bellevue Manufacturing Company =

- U.S. National Register of Historic Places
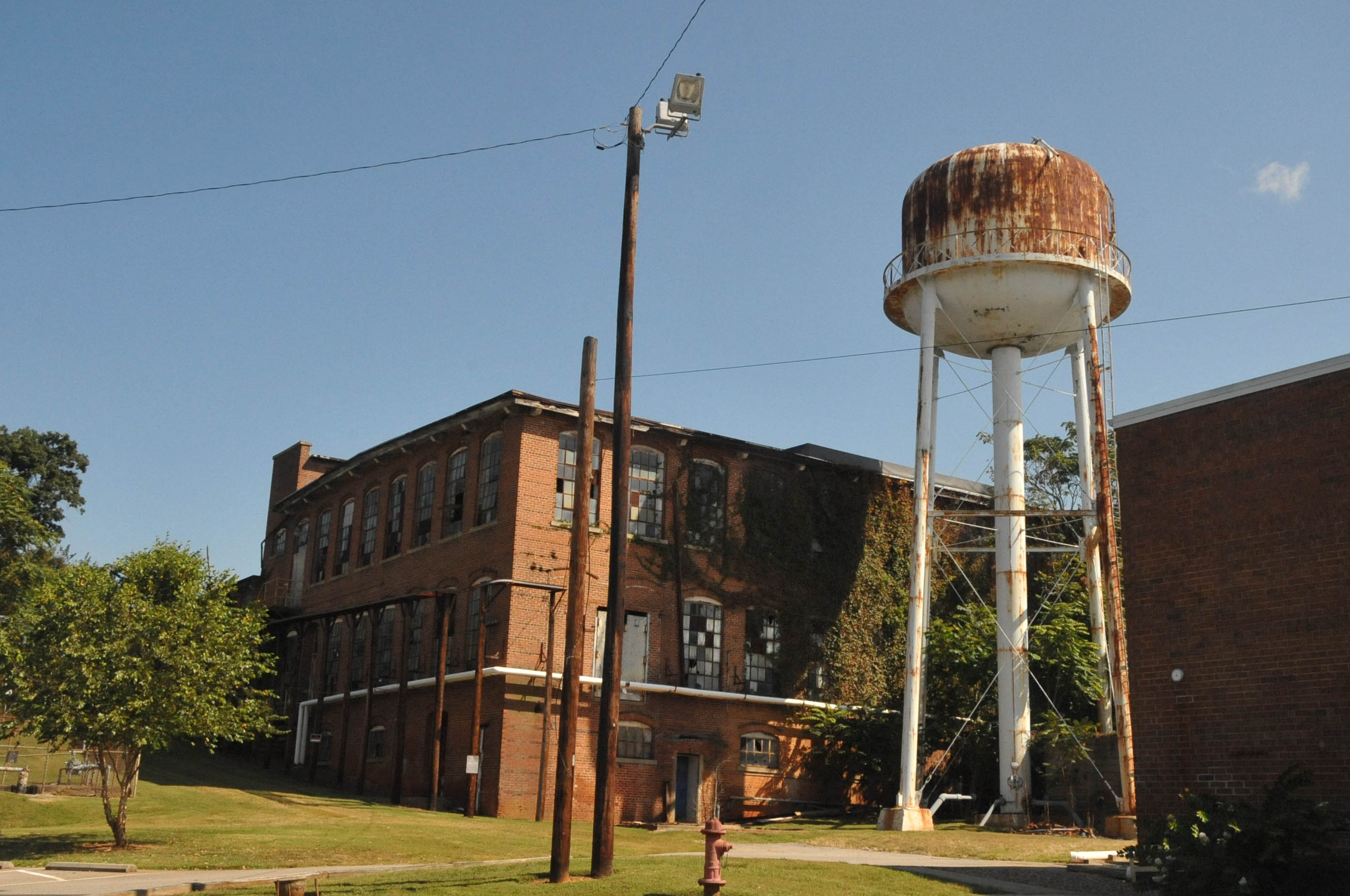
- Bellevue Manufacturing Company, March 2007

- Location within North Carolina Location within the United States
- Location: Nash St. and Eno St., Hillsborough, North Carolina
- Coordinates: 36°4′23″N 79°6′41″W
- Area: 4.5 acres (1.8 ha)
- Built: c. 1909, 1920, 1923
- NRHP reference No.: 03000858
- Added to NRHP: August 28, 2003

Bellevue Manufacturing Company is a historic textile mill complex located at Hillsborough, Orange County, North Carolina. The main mill was built about 1909, and is a two-story, side-gabled brick building, with a one-story boiler room and engine room wing. It is representative of slow-burn heavy timber construction. A one-story brick weaving room with monitor roof was built parallel to the main mill in 1920. In 1923, the wing was raised to two stories and an addition built to connect to the weaving room forming a U-shaped complex. The center of the "U" was filled in during the 1960s. Also in 1923, a separate two-story cloth building was constructed.

It was listed on the National Register of Historic Places in 2003.

On May 20, 2016, the 34,000 square foot (3,200 m^{2}) weaving room was completely destroyed by a multi-alarm fire, which required mutual aid from seven local fire departments to extinguish.
