= Murphey School =

Historic school building in North Carolina, United States

- U.S. National Register of Historic Places
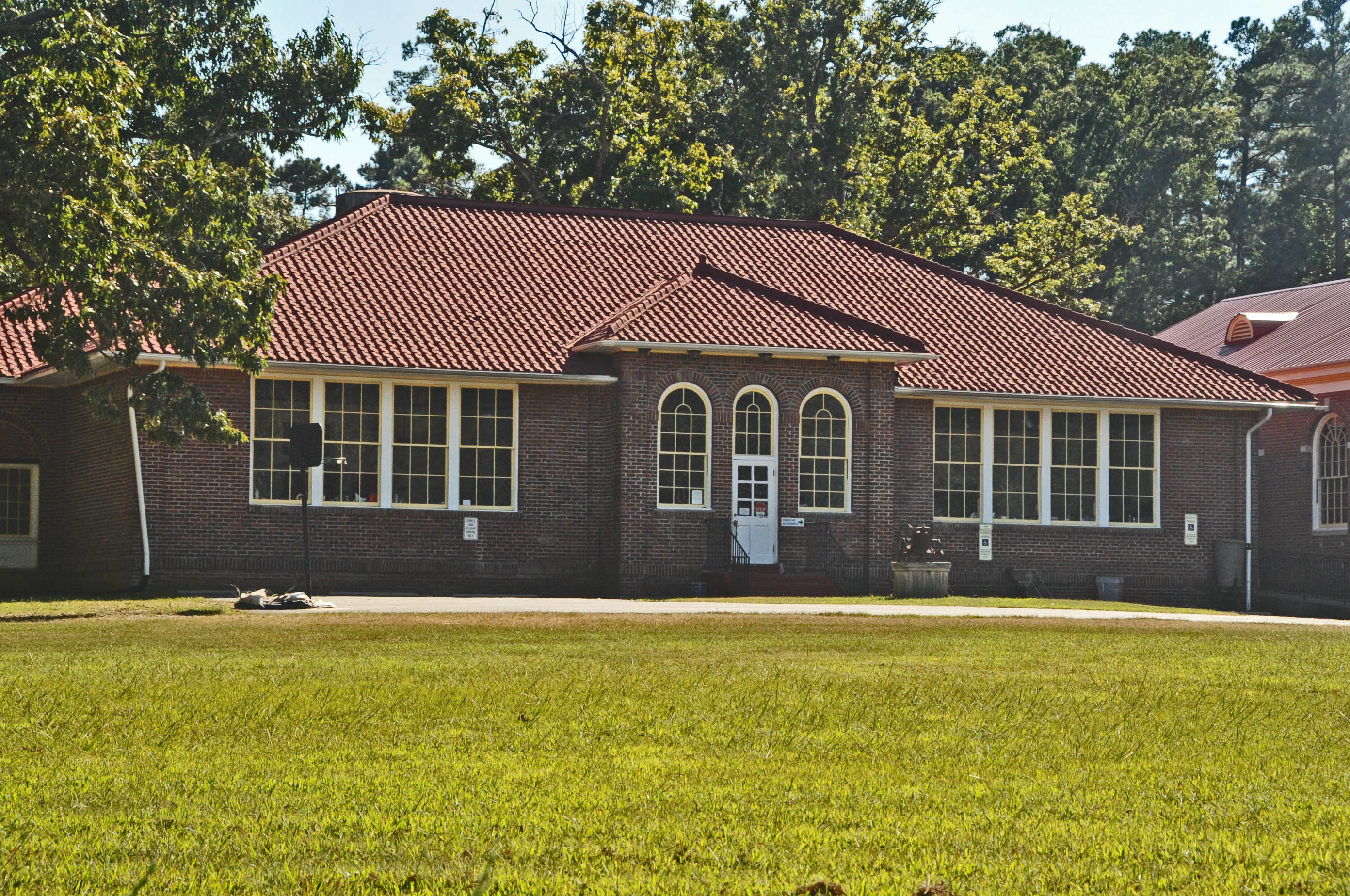
- Murphey School, March 2007

- Location within North Carolina Location within the United States
- Location: 3729 Murphy School Rd., near Hillsborough, North Carolina
- Coordinates: 36°1′44″N 79°0′54″W
- Area: 7 acres (2.8 ha)
- Built: 1923, 1939, 1959
- Architect: Linthicum, Henri C.; et al.
- Architectural style: Classical Revival, Bungalow/craftsman
- NRHP reference No.: 09000637
- Added to NRHP: August 20, 2009

Murphey School is a historic school complex located near Hillsborough, Orange County, North Carolina. The Murphey School was built in 1923, and is a one-story, Spanish Revival style brick building with a hip-on-hip roof covered in pressed metal shingles resembling terra cotta tiles. The front facade features a projecting central hip roof front entrance. Attached to the school is a one-story neoclassical style auditorium addition built in 1936 with a Doric order portico. Also on the property is a contributing 1 1/2-story bungalow style teacherage (c. 1923), well house (c. 1932), and water tower (c. 1936).

It was listed on the National Register of Historic Places in 2009.

The Murphey School Auditorium is the current home of Burning Coal Theatre Company.
