= St. Matthew's Episcopal Church and Churchyard =

Historic church in North Carolina, United States

- U.S. National Register of Historic Places
- U.S. Historic district – Contributing property
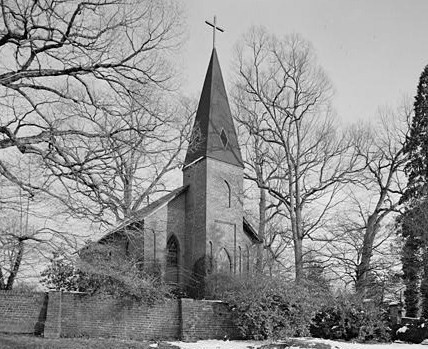

- Location within North Carolina Location within the United States
- Location: St. Mary's Rd., Hillsborough, North Carolina
- Coordinates: 36°4′35″N 79°5′43″W
- Area: 5 acres (2.0 ha)
- Built: 1825-1826, 1868
- Architect: Hawks, Francis Lister
- Architectural style: Gothic Revival
- NRHP reference No.: 71000614
- Added to NRHP: June 24, 1971

St. Matthew's Episcopal Church and Churchyard is a historic Episcopal church located on St. Mary's Road, Hillsborough, Orange County, North Carolina. The first three bays of the Gothic Revival-style brick church were built between 1825 and 1826, and its rear was extended by another bay in 1868. It features a square entrance tower built in 1830, which was rebuilt in 1850. The tower has a pyramidal spire and lancet windows. The brickwork was laid in Flemish bond.

The property was listed on the National Register of Historic Places in 1971. It is located in the Hillsborough Historic District.
