= Jacob Jackson Farm =

Historic farm in North Carolina, United States

- U.S. National Register of Historic Places
- U.S. Historic district
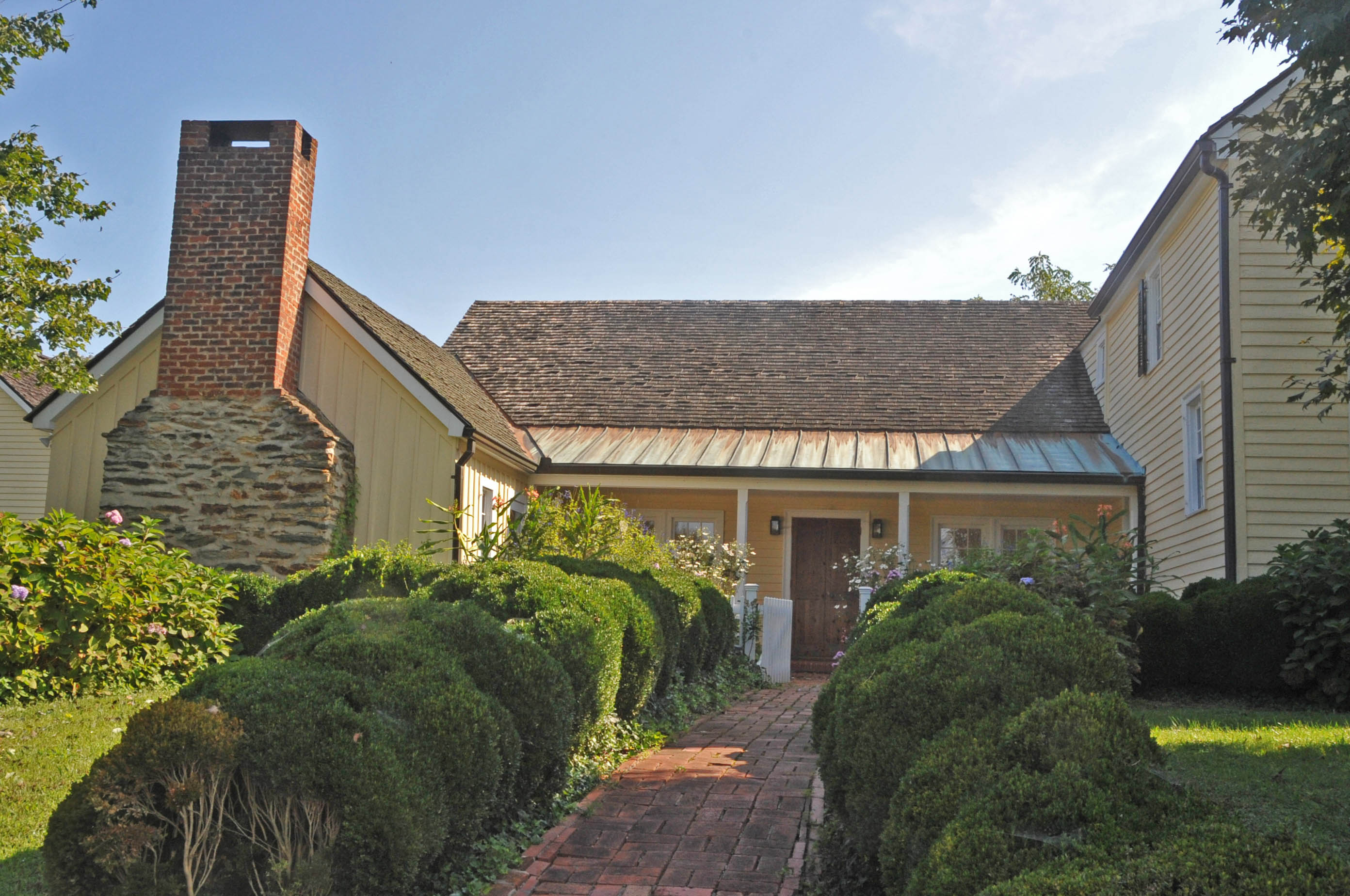
- Jacob Jackson Farmhouse, March 2007

- Location within North Carolina Location within the United States
- Location: NC 1002, 0.4 mi. W of NC 1538, Hillsborough, North Carolina
- Coordinates: 36°05′35″N 79°03′37″W
- Area: 63.2 acres (25.6 ha)
- Built: c. 1810, c. 1820
- Architectural style: Greek Revival, Federal
- NRHP reference No.: 94000184
- Added to NRHP: March 17, 1994

Jacob Jackson Farm, also known as Maple Hill, is a historic home and farm and national historic district located near Hillsborough, Orange County, North Carolina. The Maple Hill dwelling consists of a single pen, hewn log cabin (c. 1810) joined in 1940 by an ell to a two-story, weatherboarded log Federal farmhouse (c. 1820), and a 1 1/2-story, mid-19th century Greek Revival style wing. A frame dining room/kitchen block was added to the cabin in 1946. Also on the property are the contributing barn (c. 1855-1910) and agricultural landscape.

It was listed on the National Register of Historic Places in 1994.
