= Hillsborough, North Carolina =

- Town
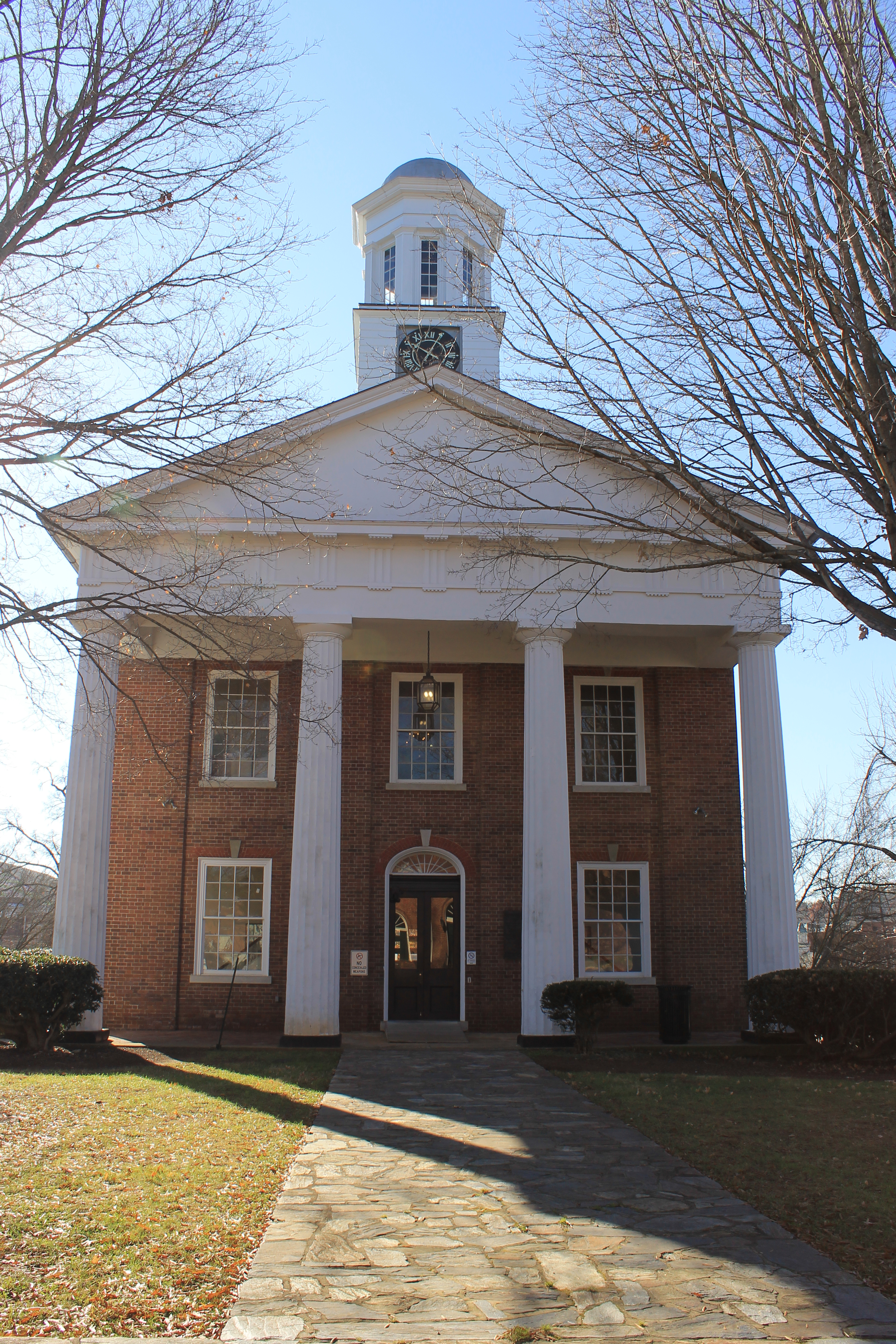
- Old Orange County Courthouse

- Seal
- Motto(s): "Around the Corner, Ahead of the Curve." - Orange County Motto
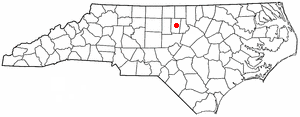
- Location of Hillsborough, North Carolina
- Coordinates: 36°04′48″N 79°06′39″W
- Country: United States
- State: North Carolina
- County: Orange
- Named for: Wills Hill, 1st Marquess of Downshire

Area
  - Total: 5.66 sq mi (14.67 km^{2})
  - Land: 5.59 sq mi (14.49 km^{2})
  - Water: 0.073 sq mi (0.19 km^{2})
- Elevation: 614 ft (187 m)

Population (2020)
  - Total: 9,660
  - Density: 1,726.9/sq mi (666.76/km^{2})
- Time zone: UTC-5 (Eastern (EST))
  - Summer (DST): UTC-4 (EDT)
- ZIP code: 27278
- Area code: 919
- FIPS code: 37-31620
- GNIS feature ID: 2405840
- Website: https://www.hillsboroughnc.gov/

The town of Hillsborough is the county seat of Orange County, North Carolina, United States, and is located along the Eno River. The population was 9,660 as of the 2020 census.

Its name was unofficially shortened to "Hillsboro" during the 19th century. In the late 1960s, residents voted to change the name back to its original, historic spelling.

== History ==
=== Native American history ===
Local Native American groups had lived in the Hillsborough area for thousands of years by the time Spanish explorers entered the region. The Great Indian Trading Path, used by generations of Native Americans, crossed the Eno River in this area. Historic Siouan-language tribes such as the Occaneechi and the Eno were living in the Hillsborough area at the time of European contact. The English explorer John Lawson recorded visiting "Occaneechi Town" here when he traveled through North Carolina in 1701. The tribes suffered high losses due to new infectious diseases brought by Europeans and conflicts with northern Native American groups; most of the survivors were eventually pushed out of their territory by British and other European settlers.

English settlers developed Hillsborough near the site of the former Occaneechi village and its river fords. In the early 18th century, some Occaneechi left Hillsborough for Virginia, though they returned to the area around 1780.

In the 1980s, an archaeological team from UNC-Chapel Hill excavated a historic Occaneechi farming village in this area. A replica of an Occaneechi village was built close to their original site of settlement near the Eno River.

=== Colonial period and Revolutionary War ===
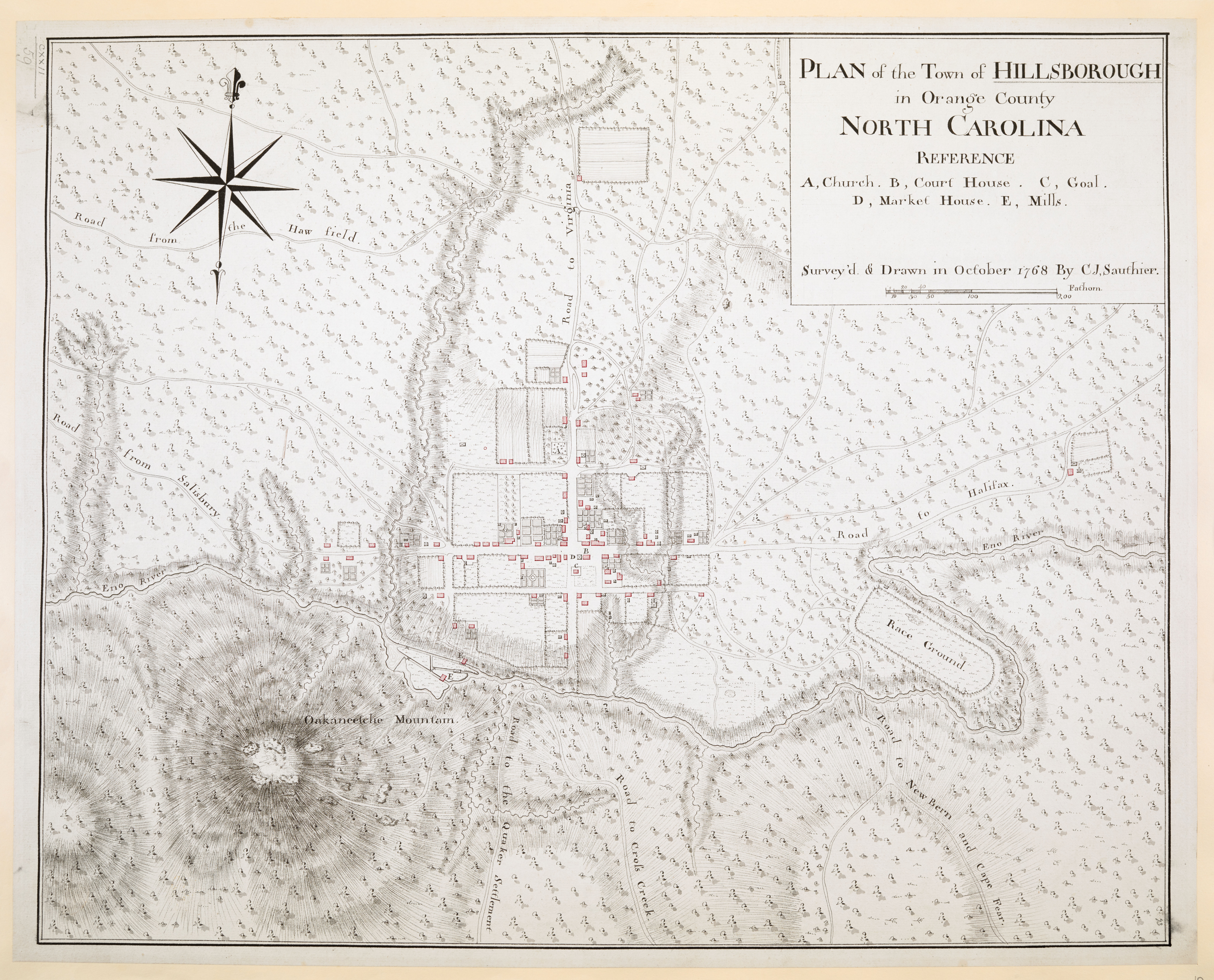
A map of the town produced in 1768 by Claude J. Sauthier.

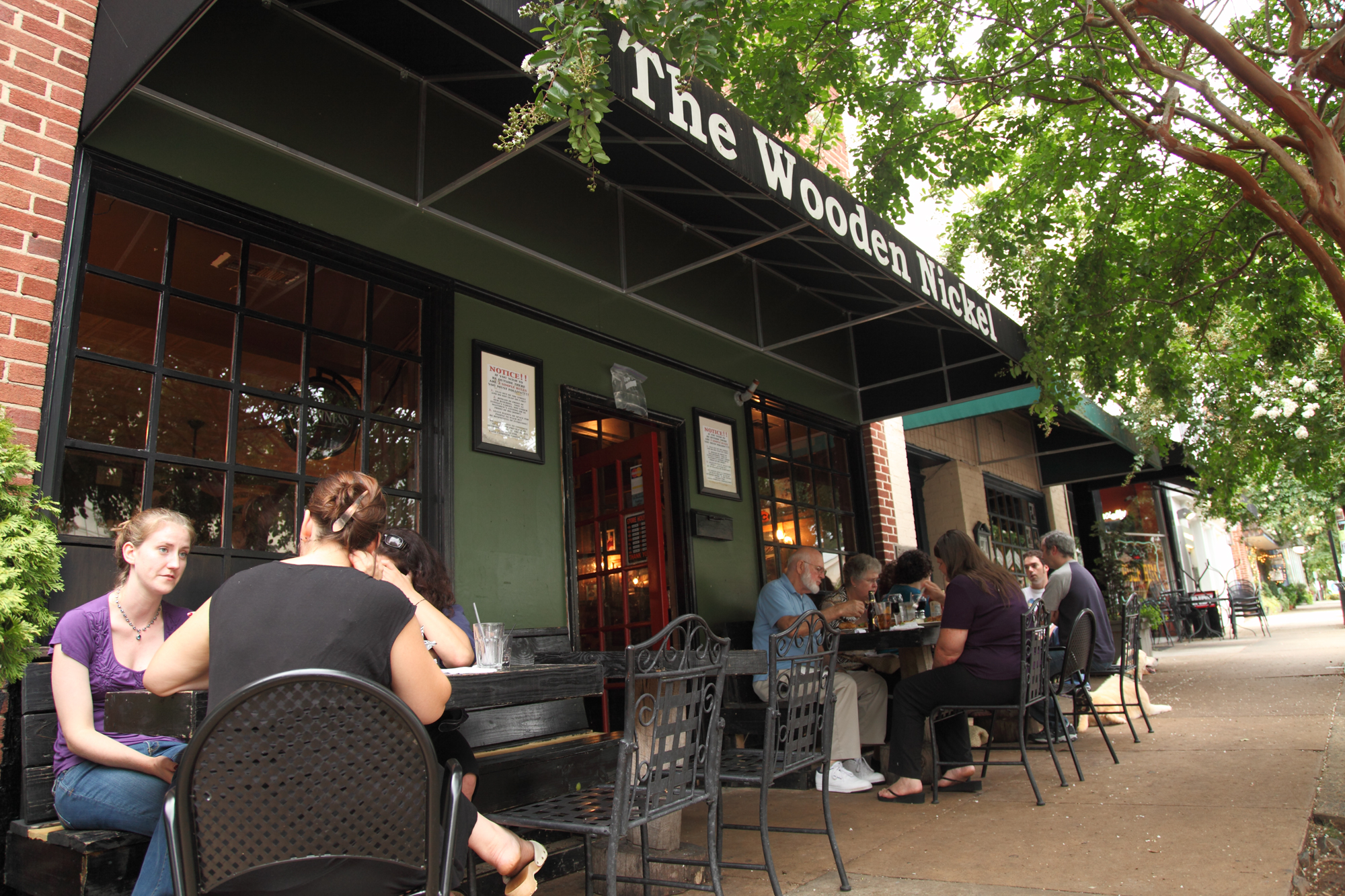
Downtown Hillsborough

Hillsborough was founded in 1754 and was first owned, surveyed, and mapped by William Churton (a surveyor for Earl Granville). Originally to be named Orange, it was first named Corbin Town (for Francis Corbin, a member of the governor's council and one of Granville's land agents). It was renamed in 1759 as Childsburgh (in honor of Thomas Child, the attorney general for North Carolina from 1751 to 1760 and another of Granville's land agents). It was not until 1766 that it was named Hillsborough, after Wills Hill, then the Earl of Hillsborough, the British secretary of state for the colonies, and a relative of royal Governor William Tryon.

Hillsborough was an early Piedmont colonial town where court was held, and was the scene of some pre-Revolutionary War tensions. In the late 1760s, tensions between Piedmont farmers and county officers arose in the Regulator movement, which had its strongest support in Hillsborough. With specie scarce, many inland farmers found themselves unable to pay their taxes and resented the consequent seizure of their property. Local sheriffs sometimes kept taxes for their own gain and sometimes charged twice for the same tax. Heavy-handed and corrupt local officials and Governor William Tryon's conspicuous consumption in the construction of a new governor's mansion at New Bern exacerbated the movement's resentment.

As the western districts were under-represented in the colonial legislature, farmers had difficulty gaining redress from the legislature. Ultimately, the frustrated farmers took to arms and closed the court in Hillsborough, dragging those they considered corrupt officials through the streets. Tryon and North Carolina militia troops marched to the region and defeated the Regulators at the Battle of Alamance in May 1771. Several trials were held after the war, resulting in the hanging of six Regulators at Hillsborough on June 19, 1771.

The North Carolina Provincial Congress met in Hillsborough from August 20 – September 10, 1775, at the outset of the American Revolution. The North Carolina General Assembly met here in 1778, 1782, and 1783. The town was also the site of the first North Carolina ratifying convention, which met July 21 – August 2, 1788, to deliberate and determine whether or not to ratify the Constitution recommended to the states by the Constitutional Convention held in Philadelphia the previous summer. With the hope of effecting the incorporation of a Bill of Rights into the frame of government, delegates voted (184–84) to neither ratify nor reject the Constitution. During the bicentennial celebration of the writing and ratification of the Constitution, a historical marker was placed at the site (now the Hillsborough Presbyterian Church) commemorating the convention.

William Hooper, a signer of the Declaration of Independence, was buried in the Presbyterian Church cemetery in October 1790. However, his remains were later reinterred at Guilford Court House Military Battlefield. His original gravestone remains in the town cemetery.

=== Antebellum period and American Civil War ===
Robert and Margaret Anna (née Robertson) Burwell ran a girl's academy called the Burwell School from 1837 to 1857 in their home on Churton Street.

When the Civil War began, Hillsborough residents were reluctant to support secession, but many men went off to fight for the Confederacy. In March 1865, Confederate General Joseph E. Johnston and his troops wintered just outside Hillsborough at the Alexander Dickson home. In 1982 this house was moved downtown in order to preserve it from commercial development; it now serves as the Hillsborough Welcome Center.

After sweeping through the South on his March to the Sea, Union General William T. Sherman camped in Raleigh. He offered an armistice to Johnston, who agreed to meet to discuss terms of surrender. Johnston, traveling east from Hillsborough, and Sherman, traveling west from Raleigh along the Hillsborough-Raleigh Road, met approximately halfway near present-day Durham (then Durham Station) at the home of James and Nancy Bennett. This farmhouse is now known as Bennett Place. The two generals met three times on April 17, 18, and finally on April 26, when they agreed on the final terms of surrender. Johnston surrendered 89,270 Southern troops who were still active in North Carolina, South Carolina, Georgia, and Florida. This was the largest surrender of troops during the war, and effectively ended the conflict.

=== Historic sites ===
There are numerous historical sites to visit in Hillsborough, including some dating to the late eighteenth century. More than 100 surviving late eighteenth and nineteenth-century structures help illustrate its history of prominence in the early period of the state.

In addition, numerous secondary buildings, bridges, mill sites and dams along the Eno River document the local history. Native American relics have been recovered from the sites of ancient villages thousands of years old.

==== Alexander Dickson House ====
The Hillsborough Visitors Center operates from this late-18th century Quaker-plan house. It was moved from its original location 1 mi (1.6 km) southeast of Hillsborough to its present location in the historic district. The site includes an office used by Confederate Gen. Joseph E. Johnston.

==== Old Orange County Courthouse ====
The Old Orange County Courthouse is an 1844 Greek-revival building designed and built by local builder John Berry. The courthouse is still used for county judicial business. The circa 1760s Hillsborough Clock located atop the town courthouse was once believed to be a gift from King George III, but its origin is currently unknown. It was first placed in the town church, then moved to the Market House. In 1781, David Fanning and the Tories raided the town, seized the bell of the clock, and threw it into the Eno River, but it was fished out by the people at war's end, the clock was fixed, given new weights, and placed in the courthouse where it still works today over 250 years later. It is one of the five oldest functioning tower clocks in the USA today.

==== Ayr Mount ====
Ayr Mount is an 1815 Federal-era plantation house, restored and furnished with period antiques and fine art. The estate includes the 1 mi (1.6 km)-long Poet's Walk.

==== Green Hill ====
Green Hill is a Federal-style plantation house. It was built circa 1750-1784 for George Johnston. It was moved in the late 1960s from its original location approximately 12 miles south of Hillsborough.

==== Parks-Richmond House (The Inn at Teardrops) ====
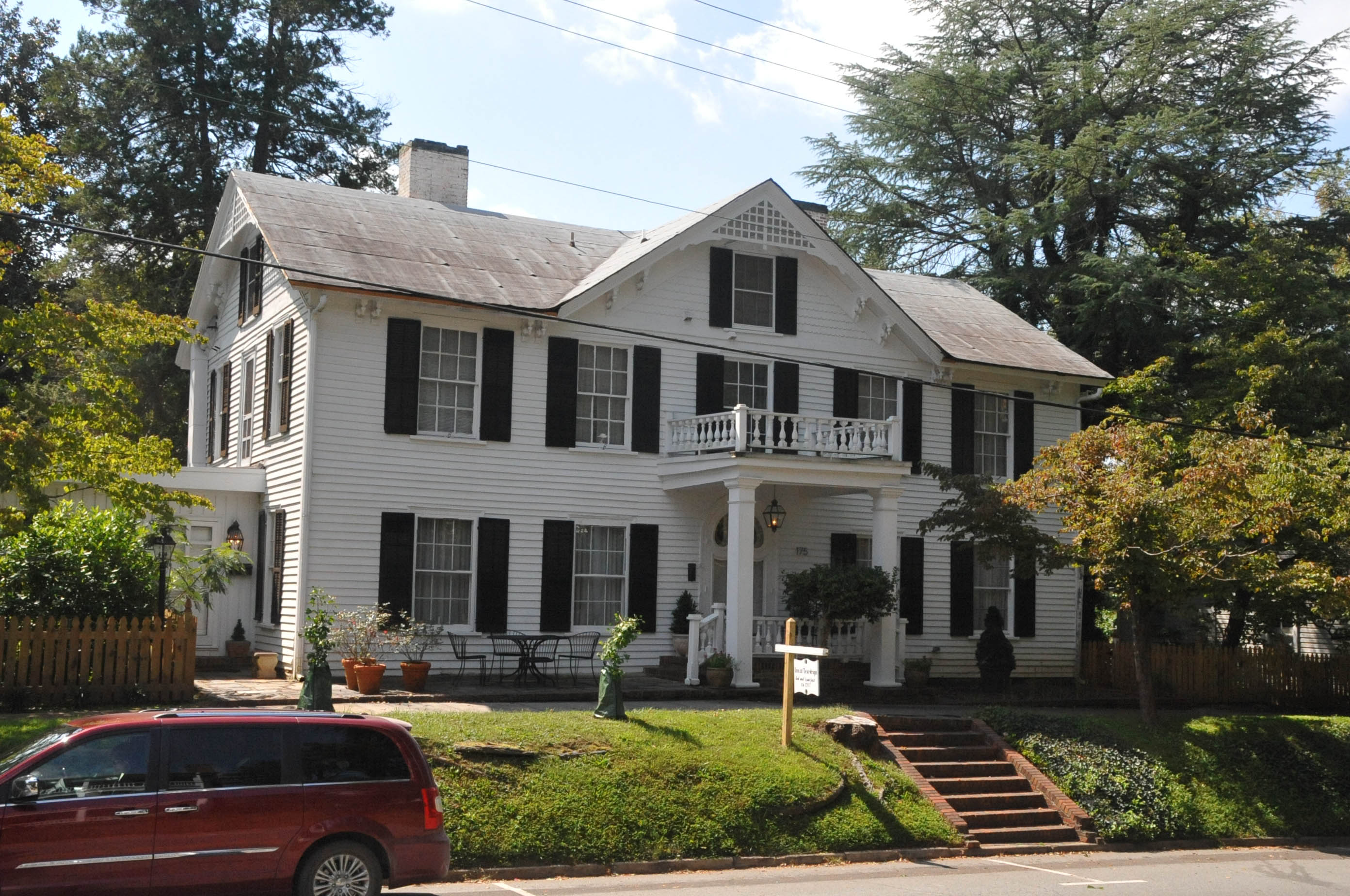
The Inn at Teardrops

The name comes from the teardrop-shaped glass on the front doors and the molding around the eaves of the house. The property was owned by Edmund Fanning until 1768, when he sold it to Thomas King, an inn keeper.

The main body of the present structure might be King's old inn. Notable eighteenth-century owners include General Thomas Person, Peter Malett, William Duffy, and John Taylor, who was clerk of the Superior Court from 1800 to 1845.

In 1938, the J.W. Richmond family bought the property and renovated the house as a private residence. After additional renovations, Richmond adapted it as 'The Inn at Teardrops', a bed and breakfast.

==== Margaret Lane Cemetery ====
Margaret Lane Cemetery, sometimes called the Old Slave Cemetery, first appears in written records in 1885. It is believed that Peter Brown Ruffin, a landowner and employer to the west of Hillsborough, bought the two 1-acre (0.40 ha) lots that comprise the cemetery from the town in 1854 to use as a burial ground.

==== Historic Occoneechee Speedway Trail ====
Occoneechee Speedway, just outside Hillsborough, was one of the first two NASCAR tracks to open in 1949. The track was made up of dirt. It is one of five tracks remaining from that inaugural season. Today, the site has been preserved as a trail.

The Historic Occoneechee Speedway Trail (HOST) is a 3 mi (4.8 km)-trail located on 44 acres (180,000 m^{2}) at the site of the former Speedway. Bill France Sr. and the early founders of NASCAR bought land to build a 1 mi (1.6 km) oval track at Hillsborough, but opposition from local religious leaders prevented the track from being built in the town. Instead, NASCAR officials moved their project to Alabama, where they built the large Talladega Superspeedway in Talladega.

==== Poplar Hill ====
A former house once owned by Julian Carr named Poplar Hill is located in the town's historic district. It was moved from its original location south of the Eno River in 1980.

==== National Register of Historic Places ====
Numerous other properties in Hillsborough are listed on the National Register of Historic Places.

They include the Bellevue Manufacturing Company, Burwell School, Cabe-Pratt-Harris House, Commandant's House, Eagle Lodge, Eno Cotton Mill, Faucett Mill and House, Hazel-Nash House, Heartsease, Holden-Roberts Farm, Jacob Jackson Farm, Montrose, Moorefields, Murphey School, Nash Law Office, Nash-Hooper House, Rigsbee's Rock House, Ruffin-Roulhac House, Sans Souci, St. Mary's Chapel, and St. Matthew's Episcopal Church and Churchyard. The Hillsborough Historic District is also listed on the NRHP.

== Geography ==
Hillsborough is located along the Eno River. The town government has constructed the Riverwalk along the river—a paved, accessible, urban greenway that stretches approximately two miles, connecting the trail system in the Occoneechee Mountain State Natural Area to trails on the Ayr Mount property and the Occoneechee Speedway trail. The Riverwalk is part of the Mountains-to-Sea Trail.

According to the United States Census Bureau, the town has a total area of 4.6 square miles (12 km^{2}), of which 4.6 square miles (12 km^{2}) is land and 0.22% is water.

The architecture of nearby Duke University incorporates the stone from the local Hillsborough Quarry. Now sometimes referred to as the Duke Stone, it is included in the design of almost every building on Duke University West Campus which was originally designed by architect Julian Abele.

== Demographics ==
Historical population
Census	Pop.	Note	%±
1800	474		—
1850	582		—
1860	751		29.0%
1870	809		7.7%
1880	781		−3.5%
1890	662		−15.2%
1900	707		6.8%
1910	857		21.2%
1920	1,180		37.7%
1930	1,232		4.4%
1940	1,311		6.4%
1950	1,329		1.4%
1960	1,349		1.5%
1970	1,444		7.0%
1980	3,019		109.1%
1990	4,263		41.2%
2000	5,446		27.8%
2010	6,087		11.8%
2020	9,660		58.7%
2025 (est.)	9,778	▲	1.2%
U.S. Decennial Census

=== 2020 census ===
Hillsborough racial composition
Race	Number	Percentage
White (non-Hispanic)	6,076	62.9%
Black or African American (non-Hispanic)	1,786	18.49%
Native American	34	0.35%
Asian	216	2.24%
Pacific Islander	2	0.02%
Other/Mixed	559	5.79%
Hispanic or Latino	988	10.23%

As of the 2020 census, Hillsborough had a population of 9,660. The median age was 39.3 years. 22.3% of residents were under the age of 18 and 17.1% were 65 years of age or older. For every 100 females there were 89.7 males, and for every 100 females age 18 and over there were 87.1 males age 18 and over.

98.2% of residents lived in urban areas, while 1.8% lived in rural areas.

There were 3,943 households in Hillsborough and 1,668 families. Of all households, 31.8% had children under the age of 18 living in them, 43.7% were married-couple households, 15.4% were households with a male householder and no spouse or partner present, and 34.4% were households with a female householder and no spouse or partner present. About 30.8% of all households were made up of individuals and 12.5% had someone living alone who was 65 years of age or older.

There were 4,267 housing units, of which 7.6% were vacant. The homeowner vacancy rate was 3.0% and the rental vacancy rate was 5.5%.

=== 2000 census ===
As of the census of 2000, there were 5,446 people, 2,101 households, and 1,428 families residing in the town. The population density was 1,188.7 inhabitants per square mile (459.0/km^{2}). There were 2,329 housing units at an average density of 508.3 per square mile (196.3/km^{2}). The racial makeup of the town was 60.26% White, 34.83% African American, 0.51% Native American, 0.57% Asian, 1.62% from other races, and 2.20% from two or more races. Hispanic or Latino of any race were 2.79% of the population.

There were 2,101 households, out of which 34.9% had children under the age of 18 living with them, 42.9% were married couples living together, 20.9% had a female householder with no husband present, and 32.0% were non-families. 26.2% of all households were made up of individuals, and 9.6% had someone living alone who was 65 years of age or older. The average household size was 2.48 and the average family size was 2.99.

In the town, the population was spread out, with 26.2% under the age of 18, 7.2% from 18 to 24, 32.7% from 25 to 44, 21.1% from 45 to 64, and 12.8% who were 65 years of age or older. The median age was 36 years. For every 100 females, there were 86.3 males. For every 100 females age 18 and over, there were 81.0 males.

The median income for a household in the town was $40,111, and the median income for a family was $46,793. Males had a median income of $36,636 versus $29,052 for females. The per capita income for the town was $21,818. About 11.0% of families and 12.6% of the population were below the poverty line, including 16.1% of those under age 18 and 16.6% of those age 65 or over.

== Arts and culture ==
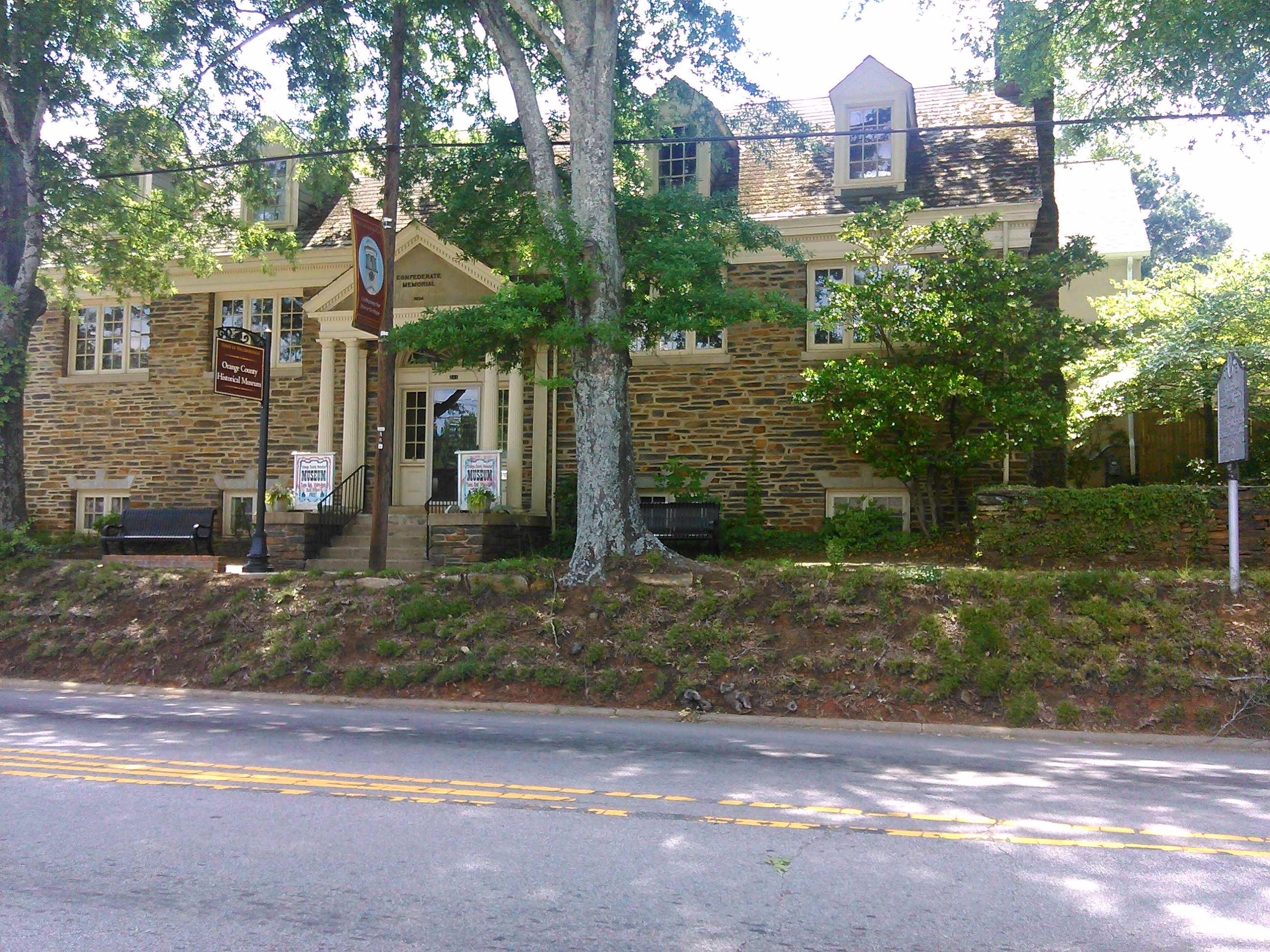
Orange County Historical Museum

=== Art galleries and museums ===
- Eno Gallery - Contemporary Fine Art Gallery.
- Hillsborough Gallery of Arts - Artists cooperative gallery.
- Hillsborough Arts Council Gallery
- Orange County Historical Museum - Chartered in 1956 to preserve and interpret the history of Hillsborough and Orange County.

Hillsborough is also home to the internationally recognized arts nonprofit organization, the Music Maker Relief Foundation

== Education ==
Hillsborough is part of the Orange County School District, which includes River Park Elementary, Efland Cheeks Elementary, Grady A. Brown Elementary, New Hope Elementary, Pathways Elementary, Central Elementary and Hillsborough Elementary Schools (K-5), A.L. Stanback Middle School, Orange Middle School, Gravelly Hill Middle School, Cedar Ridge High School, and Orange High School. Hillsborough is also home to charter schools Eno River Academy (K-12) and The Expedition School (K-8), as well as alternative school Partnership Academy (9–12). Durham Technical Community College also has an Orange County campus in Hillsborough.

== Notable people ==
For its size, Hillsborough has a high concentration of residents who are nationally known artists and authors, including Lee Smith, Jill McCorkle, Allan Gurganus, Michael Malone, Annie Dillard, Hal Crowther, Frances Mayes, and David Payne.

- George B. Anderson (1831–1862), Civil War Confederate general, killed at the Battle of Antietam
- Thomas Hart Benton (1782–1858), U.S. Missouri Senator known as "Old Bullion" was born near Hillsborough. One of the early champions of westward expansion that would become known as Manifest Destiny.
- Harriet Morehead Berry (1877–1940), civic leader and suffragist
- Armistead Burwell (1839–1913), associate justice of the North Carolina Supreme Court from 1892 to 1894
- Minerva Ruffin Cain Caldwell (1820–1890), First Lady of North Carolina
- Kizzmekia Corbett (born 1986), Senior Research Fellow and Scientific Lead on the Coronavirus Vaccines & Immunopathogenesis Team at the National Institutes of Health
- Margaret Mordecai Jones Cruikshank (1878–1955), first female president of St. Mary's Junior College
- Annie Dillard (born 1945), author
- Valerie Foushee (born 1956), U.S. representative, former North Carolina state senator, state representative, and Orange County commissioner
- Allan Gurganus (born 1947), author of Oldest Living Confederate Widow Tells All
- John Dee Holeman (1929–2021), Piedmont blues musician
- William Hooper (1742–1790), lawyer and politician who signed the United States Declaration of Independence for North Carolina
- Michelle Jin (born 1974), professional bodybuilder
- Elizabeth Keckley (1818–1907), dressmaker and confidante of Mary Todd Lincoln and enslaved in the Burwell Household
- Michael Malone, Edgar Award-winning novelist and Daytime Emmy Award-winning soap opera writer
- Doug Marlette (1949–2007), cartoonist and author, maintained a home in Hillsborough and was buried there
- Elizabeth Matheson (born 1942), photographer
- Frances Mayes (born 1940), author
- Logan Pause (born 1981), soccer player
- Hilda Pinnix-Ragland, business executive
- Connie Ray (born 1956), actress
- Scott Satterfield (born 1972), head football coach at University of Cincinnati
- Lee Smith (born 1944), author
- Billy Strayhorn (1915–1967), jazz composer, pianist and arranger
- Shepperd Strudwick (1907–1983), actor
- Bryse Wilson (born 1997), Major League Baseball pitcher
- Payton Wilson (born 2000), NFL linebacker
- Trenton Gill (born 1999), NFL punter for the Chicago Bears
- Ronnie Warner (born 1965), Actor, writer, director, film producer
