= Cedar Grove Rural Crossroads Historic District =

Historic district in North Carolina, United States

- U.S. National Register of Historic Places
- U.S. Historic district
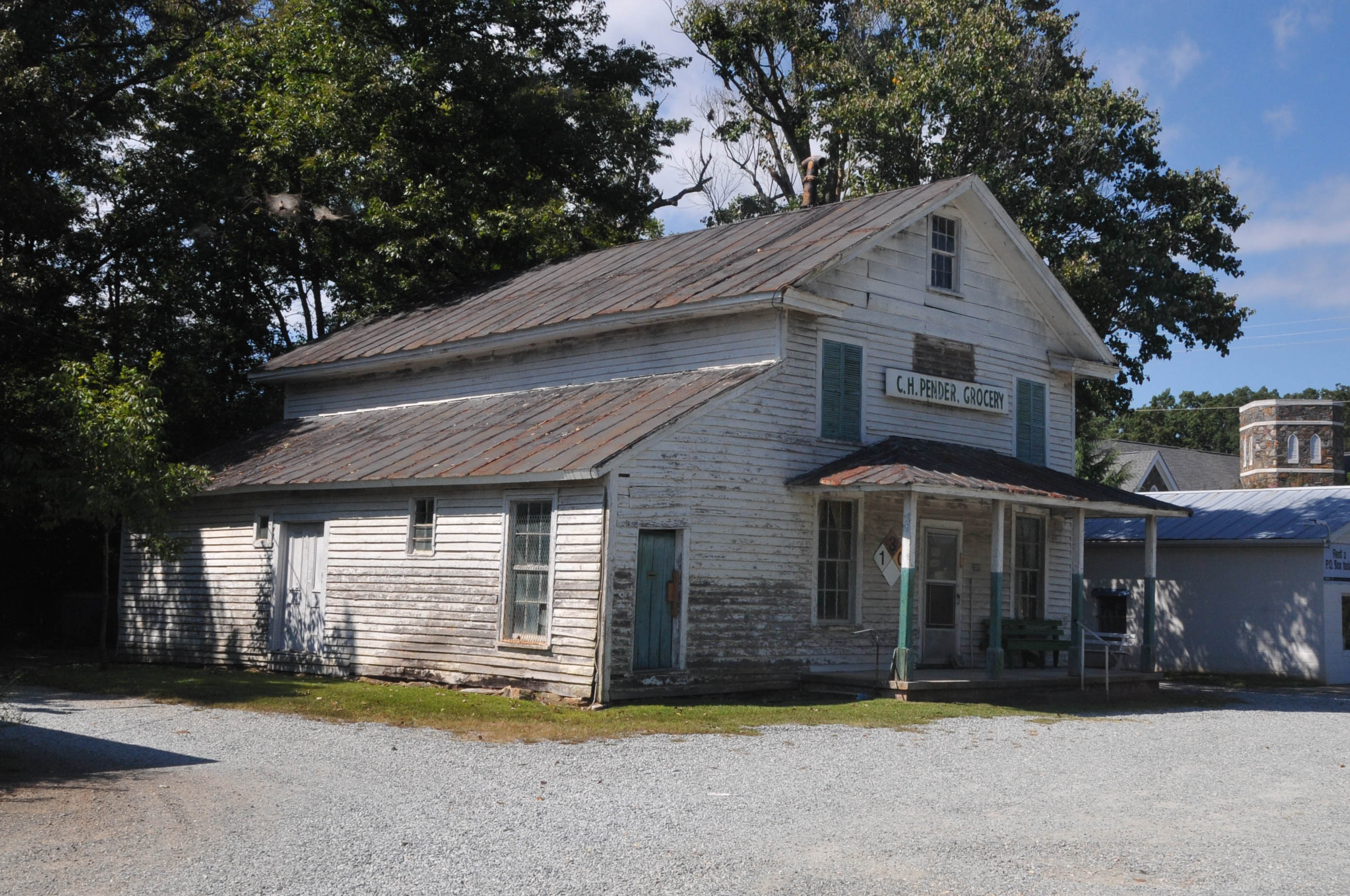
- Allison-Oliver-Pender Store (1880s), March 2007

- Location within North Carolina Location within the United States
- Location: Roughly along Carr Store Rd. and Efland-Cedar Grove Rd., Cedar Grove, North Carolina
- Coordinates: 36°10′12″N 79°10′11″W
- Area: 125 acres (51 ha)
- Built: c. 1880
- Architect: Liner, Henry; McDade, Charlie
- Architectural style: Mid 19th Century Revival, Late Victorian, Late 19th And 20th Century Revivals
- NRHP reference No.: 98000389
- Added to NRHP: April 23, 1998

Cedar Grove Rural Crossroads Historic District is a national historic district located at Cedar Grove, Orange County, North Carolina. The district encompasses 44 contributing buildings, 9 contributing sites, and 7 contributing structures in the rural crossroads community of Cedar Grove. The district developed from the mid-19th to mid-20th century, and includes notable examples of Late Victorian and Colonial Revival style architecture. Notable buildings include the Rogers-McDade House, Eno Presbyterian Church (1897-1899), Cedar Grove Methodist Church (1939), Allison-Oliver-Pender Store (1880s), and Allen A. Ellis Store (1923).

It was listed on the National Register of Historic Places in 1998.
