= Speechley =

Speechley is a surname. Notable people with the surname include:

- Anne Elizabeth Speechley (1903–1992), Australian politician
- Jim Speechley, former Conservative Party councillor and leader of the Lincolnshire County Council
- Michael Speechley (born 1964), Australian former professional rugby league footballer
- William Speechley (1906–1982), British ice hockey player who competed in the 1928 Winter Olympics

== See also ==
- Schley (disambiguation)
- Speech
