= Schley =

Schley may refer to:

== People with the surname ==
- James M. Schley (died 1883), American politician and lawyer from Maryland
- Julian Larcombe Schley (1880–1965), Governor of the Panama Canal Zone from 1932 to 1936.
- William Schley (1786–1858), an American politician
- Winfield Scott Schley (1839–1911), an American admiral

== Places ==
United States

- Schley, Indiana, an unincorporated community
- Schley, Minnesota, an unincorporated community
- Schley, North Carolina, an unincorporated community
- Schley, Wisconsin, a town
- Schley County, Georgia

Greenland

- G.B. Schley Fjord

== Ships ==
- Two United States Navy ships have been named USS Schley
