= Dr. Arch Jordan House =

Historic house in North Carolina, United States

- U.S. National Register of Historic Places
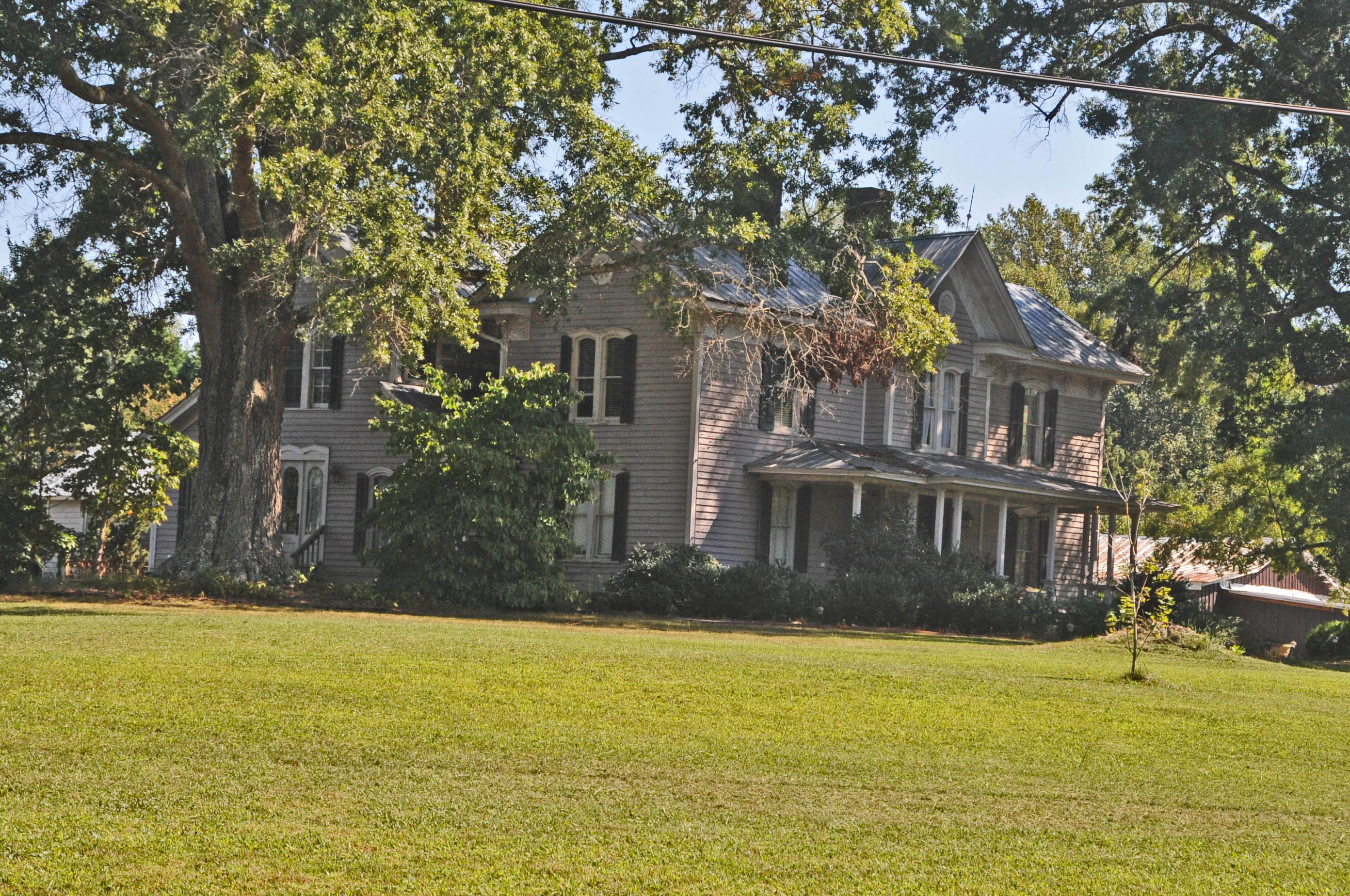
- Dr. Arch Jordan House, March 2007

- Location within North Carolina Location within the United States
- Location: 7015 NC 57, Caldwell, North Carolina
- Coordinates: 36°11′06″N 79°01′08″W
- Area: 47.2 acres (19.1 ha)
- Built: c. 1875, c. 1905
- Architectural style: Italianate
- NRHP reference No.: 98000995
- Added to NRHP: August 6, 1998

Dr. Arch Jordan House, also known as the manse for Little River Presbyterian Church, is a historic home located near Caldwell, Orange County, North Carolina. It was built about 1875, and is a two-story, single pile, central hall plan, Italianate style frame dwelling. It features a central projecting gable, bracketed eaves, and a columned porch with a low hipped roof. Attached at the rear is an originally-separate two-story kitchen building. Also on the property are the contributing combination smokehouse/food storage shed, log and weatherboard tobacco barn, and 1 1/2-story main barn.

It was listed on the National Register of Historic Places in 1998 based on a nomination prepared by Keith A. Zahniser. Dr. Jordan was a prominent physician. Across NC 57, Dr. Jordan built the Little River General Store and Pharmacy, circa 1870. He taught at the nearby Caldwell Institute, a residential secondary school during the late nineteenth and early twentieth centuries.
