= Bingham School =

Historic school building in North Carolina, United States

- U.S. National Register of Historic Places
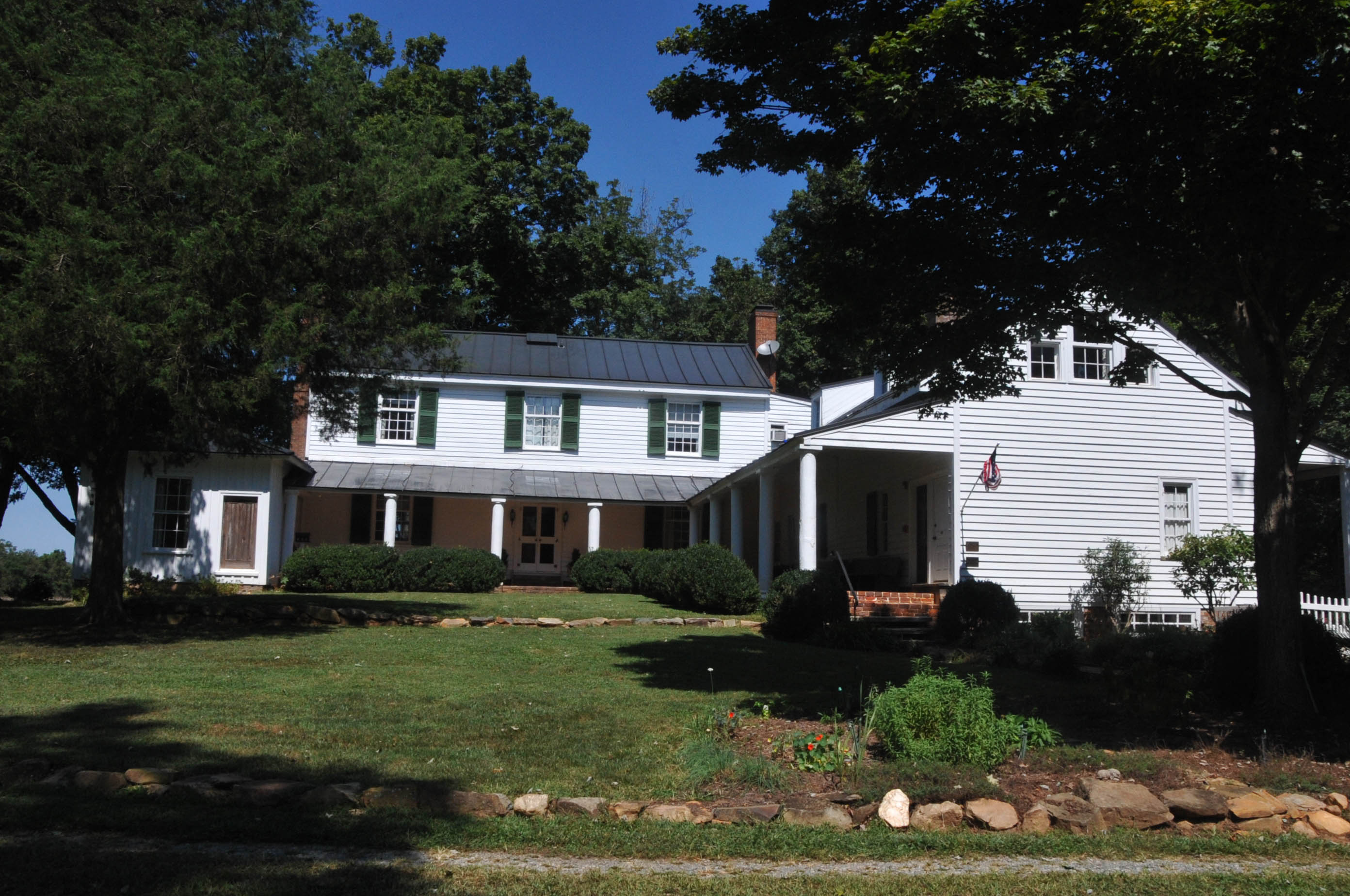
- Headmaster's home, Bingham School, March 2007

- Location within North Carolina Location within the United States
- Location: NC 54 and SR 1007, Oaks, North Carolina
- Coordinates: 35°57′13″N 79°15′16″W
- Area: 10 acres (4.0 ha)
- Built: 1845
- Architectural style: Greek Revival
- NRHP reference No.: 78001969
- Added to NRHP: January 18, 1978

Bingham School is a historic school complex located at Oaks, Orange County, North Carolina. The complex includes a large, expansive, multi-stage headmaster's house, a contemporary smokehouse and well house. The oldest section of the house is a log structure that forms the rear ell and dates to the early 19th century. Attached to it is a frame addition. The front section of the house, is a two-story Greek Revival style, three bay by two bay, frame block dated to about 1845. The rear of the house features a colonnaded porch with Doric order columns that carries along the rear of the two-story section and the front of the ell. The school operated at this location from about 1845 to near the end of the American Civil War.

It was listed on the National Register of Historic Places in 1978.

== Notable alumni ==
- Richmond P. Davis (1866–1937), US Army major general
- Frank Mebane (1865–1926), American industrialist
