= North Carolina Highway 57 =

State highway in North Carolina, US

North Carolina Highway 57

Route information
- Maintained by NCDOT
- Length: 43.1 mi (69.4 km)
- Existed: 1921–present

Major junctions
- South end: NC 86 near Hillsborough
- US 501 in Roxboro; US 158 / NC 49 in Roxboro
- North end: NC 62 in Milton

Location
- Country: United States
- State: North Carolina
- Counties: Orange, Person, Caswell

Highway system
- North Carolina Highway System; Interstate; US; State; Scenic
← NC 56	→ NC 58

North Carolina Highway 57 (NC 57) is a 43.1-mile-long (69.4 km) primary state highway in the U.S. state of North Carolina and a semi-rural traffic artery connecting Roxboro to a few small-to-medium-sized towns in The Triangle region north of the cities of Durham and Chapel Hill.

== Route description ==
NC 57 begins at the junction with NC 86 just north of Hillsborough. It heads northeast through Orange County, passing through Schley and intersecting NC 157 in Caldwell. The route crosses into Person County and then runs concurrent with US 501 heading north through Timberlake and Somerset. Upon entering Roxboro, NC 57 and US 501 become concurrent with US 158 before entering town. The three routes intersect the northern terminus of NC 157 at the intersection of Main Street and at Long Avenue, US 158 splits from the NC 57/US 501 concurrency. At Leasburg Road, NC 57 splits from US 501 and then runs concurrent with NC 49, heading west and running concurrent with US 158 again before splitting from the NC 49/US 158 concurrency at the Concord Road intersection. The route continues to the northwest, going through Olive hill and passing by Hyco Lake before passing through Semora and intersecting NC 119. It continues to the northwest and then it enters Milton before reaching its northern terminus at the intersection with NC 62.

== History ==
During the 1920s, NC 57 originally ran east–west from Roxboro to Henderson along present day US 158. By 1940, the highway was changed to its current route.

== Major intersections ==
County	Location	mi	km	Destinations	Notes
Orange		0.0	0.0	NC 86 – Hillsborough, Yanceyville	Southern terminus
Orange	Caldwell, Orange County	8.6	13.8	NC 157	
Person		14.7	23.7	US 501 south (Durham Road) – Durham	Southern end of US 501 concurrency
Person	Roxboro	24.5	39.4	US 158 east (Old Durham Road) – Oxford	Southern end of US 158 concurrency
Person	Roxboro	24.9	40.1	NC 157 south (Main Street)	Northern terminus of NC 157
Person	Roxboro	25.5	41.0	US 501 north / NC 49 north (Madison Boulevard) – South Boston, Virgilina	Northern end of US 501 concurrency; southern end of NC 49 concurrency
Person	Roxboro	25.9	41.7	US 158 west / NC 49 south (Leasburg Road) – Haw River	Northern end of US 158 / NC 49 concurrencies
Caswell	Semora	38.2	61.5	NC 119 to US 58 – Mebane	Northern terminus
Caswell	Milton	43.1	69.4	NC 62 (Academy Street / Broad Street) / Fairview Drive – Yanceyville, Danville	
1.000 mi = 1.609 km; 1.000 km = 0.621 mi: Concurrency terminus

== See also ==
- North Carolina Bicycle Route 4 - Concurrent with NC 57 from downtown Roxboro to Kelly Brewer Road at Hyco Lake
