= Capt. John S. Pope Farm =

Historic farm in North Carolina, United States

- U.S. National Register of Historic Places
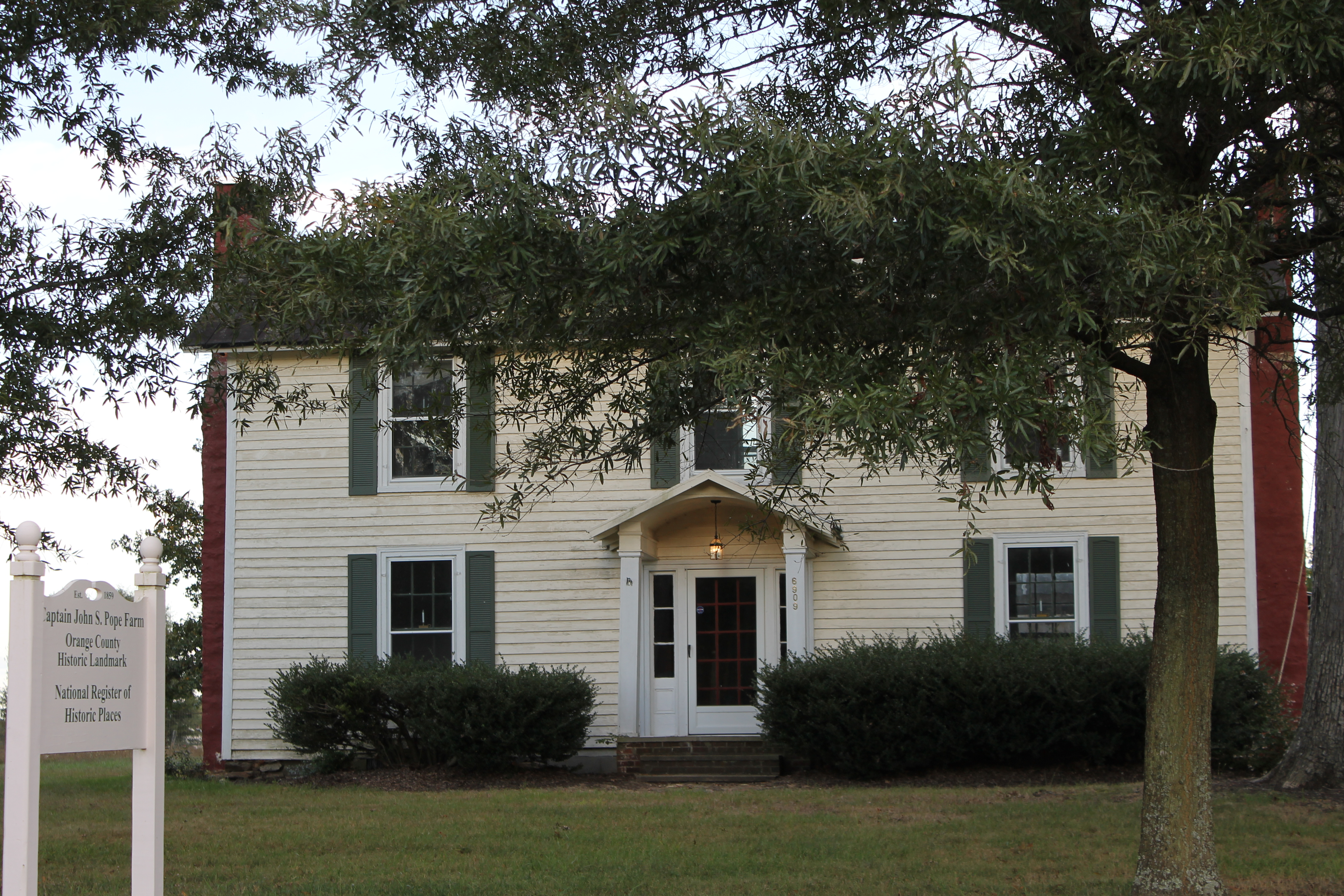
- Capt. John S. Pope Farm, September 2013

- Location within North Carolina Location within the United States
- Location: 6909 Efland-Cedar Grove Rd., near Cedar Grove, North Carolina
- Coordinates: 36°11′53″N 79°10′09″W
- Area: 73.05 acres (29.56 ha)
- Built: c. 1870-1874
- Architectural style: I-house
- NRHP reference No.: 13000206
- Added to NRHP: April 23, 2013

Capt. John S. Pope Farm is a historic tobacco farm complex located near Cedar Grove, Orange County, North Carolina. The farmhouse was built between 1870 and 1874, and is a two-story, frame I-house with a one-story ell. It sits on a stone pier foundation, has a triple gable roof, and features stone gable end chimneys. Also on the property are the contributing well house (c. 1920), washhouse (c. 1875, 1930s), garage / smokehouse (c. 1900, c. 1920), flower house (c. 1900), two corn cribs (c. 1900, c. 1930), feed barn (c. 1900), tobacco ordering/stripping house (c. 1935), two curing barns (c. 1955), stick shed (c. 1950), five tobacco barns (c. 1875-1955), a spring-fed well (c. 1909), workshop (c. 1960), a small log building (c. 1880), two wood sheds (c. 1920, c. 1950), and the surrounding agricultural landscape.

It was listed on the National Register of Historic Places in 2013.
