= Cane Creek Reservoir =

Reservoir in North Carolina

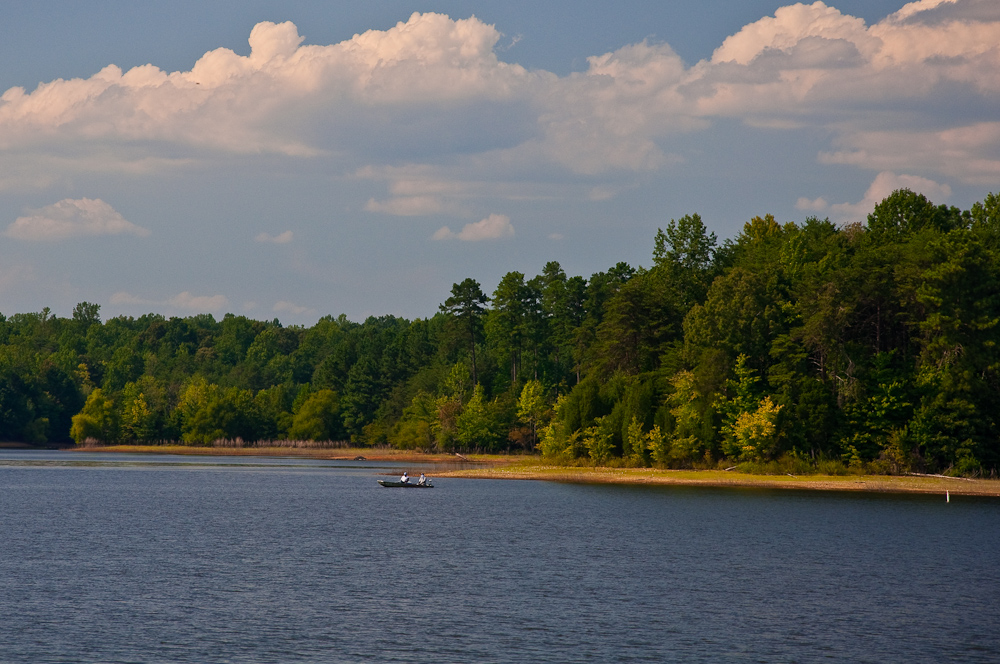
- Fishing on Cane Creek Reservoir

- Location within North Carolina Location within the United States
- Interactive map of Cane Creek Reservoir
- Location: Orange County, North Carolina
- Coordinates: 35°57′45″N 79°13′07″W
- Type: Reservoir
- Primary inflows: Cane Creek, Tom's Creek, Watery Creek, and Turkey Hill Creek
- Basin countries: United States
- Managing agency: Orange Water and Sewer Authority
- Built: 1977
- First flooded: 1989
- Surface area: 540 acres (220 ha)
- Water volume: 2,900,000,000 US gallons (1.1×10^{10} L; 2.4×10^{9} imp gal)
- Website: OWASA website

Cane Creek Reservoir is a reservoir in Orange County, North Carolina serving the Carrboro-Chapel Hill area. It is operated by the Orange Water and Sewer Authority (OWASA).

== History ==
Proposals to build a reservoir on Cane Creek were made as the area's population was growing too large to be sustained by University Lake. In the 1950s, Daniel Okun, professor of environmental sciences and engineering at UNC, tasked his students with determining the best potential water source for UNC. They identified Cane Creek as the best source, which as confirmed by an independent engineering consultant.

Several other possible water sources were discussed. One possibility was expanding University Lake by building a larger dam, which was deemed too expensive, or tapping into the Haw River or Jordan Lake which both had inferior water quality. The proposed construction of Cane Creek Reservoir was controversial with locals, who lost homes and farmland when the reservoir was made.

Objections to Cane Creek Reservoir resulted in a "a protracted, statewide discussion". The Cane Creek Conservation Association lobbied to block the reservoir's construction, while OWASA lobbied to build it. Eventually, the courts forced local landowners to sell their land in the watershed under eminent domain, and the reservoir was built. The dam was completed in 1977, and the reservoir was filled in 1989. It is about 11 miles (18 km) west of Carrboro.

The reservoir is fed by Cane Creek, Tom's Creek, Watery Creek, and Turkey Hill Creek. The Cane Creek Reservoir Dam is 72 feet (22 m). It has an area of 540 acres (220 ha), and a volume of 2,900,000,000 US gallons (1.1×10^{10} L; 2.4×10^{9} imp gal). Swimming is not permitted on the lake but boating and fishing are allowed, provided the boats do not use gasoline engines.
