= Teer, North Carolina =

Teer
- Unincorporated community
- Location within the state
- Coordinates: 35°57′38″N 79°13′49″W
- Country: United States
- State: North Carolina
- County: Orange
- Elevation: 486 ft (148 m)
- Time zone: UTC-5 (Eastern (EST))
  - Summer (DST): UTC-4 (EDT)
- GNIS feature ID: 1022899

Teer is an unincorporated community in southwestern Orange County, North Carolina, United States, northeast of Oaks. Its elevation is 486 feet or 148 meters.
