= Buckhorn, North Carolina =

- Unincorporated community
- Location of Buckhorn in North Carolina Buckhorn, North Carolina (the United States)
- Coordinates: 36°04′14″N 79°13′31″W
- Country: United States
- State: North Carolina
- County: Orange
- Elevation: 725 ft (221 m)
- Time zone: UTC-5 (Eastern (EST))
  - Summer (DST): UTC-4 (EDT)
- ZIP code: 27243
- Area code: 919
- FIPS code: 37-37135
- GNIS feature ID: 1024880
- Other names: Cheeks Crossroads

Buckhorn (or Cheeks Crossroads), is an unincorporated community in Orange County, North Carolina, United States, located south of Miles.
