= Miles, North Carolina =

- Unincorporated community
- Location of Miles in North Carolina Miles, North Carolina (the United States)
- Coordinates: 36°05′10″N 79°13′35″W
- Country: United States
- State: North Carolina
- County: Orange
- Elevation: 702 ft (214 m)
- Time zone: UTC-5 (Eastern (EST))
  - Summer (DST): UTC-4 (EDT)
- Area code: 919
- GNIS feature ID: 989850

Miles is an unincorporated community in Orange County, North Carolina, United States, located on U.S. Route 70, north of Buckhorn.
