= Morgan Creek (New Hope River tributary) =

Stream in North Carolina, USA

Morgan Creek Tributary to New Hope River
- Location of Morgan Creek mouth Morgan Creek (New Hope River tributary) (the United States)

Location
- Country: United States
- State: North Carolina
- County: Chatham; Durham; Orange
- City: Chapel Hill; Carrboro

Physical characteristics
- Source: Cane Creek and New Hope Creek divide
  - location: about 0.5 miles northeast of Dodsons Crossroads, North Carolina
  - coordinates: 35°58′42″N 079°08′39″W
  - elevation: 490 ft (150 m)
- Mouth: New Hope River
  - location: B. Everett Jordan Lake
  - coordinates: 35°48′38″N 078°59′48″W
  - elevation: 216 ft (66 m)
- Length: 21.03 mi (33.84 km)
- Basin size: 59.67 square miles (154.5 km^{2})
- Discharge
  - location: New Hope River (B. Everett Jordan Lake)
  - average: 64.68 cu ft/s (1.832 m^{3}/s) at mouth with New Hope River

Basin features
- Progression: generally southeast
- River system: Haw River
- Tributaries
  - left: Meeting of the Waters; Chapel Creek
  - right: Neville Creek; East Branch Price Creek; Wilson Creek; Buck Creek; Cub Creek
- Waterbodies: B. Everett Jordan Lake
- Bridges: Dairyland Road (x3), NC 54, Jones Ferry Road, Smith Level Road, US 15, Old Farrington Road

Morgan Creek is a 21.03 mi (33.84 km) long 4th order tributary to the New Hope River in North Carolina. Morgan Creek forms the New Hope River along with New Hope Creek within the B. Everett Jordan Lake Reservoir.

== Course ==
Morgan Creek rises in a pond on the Cane Creek and New Hope Creek divide about 0.5 miles northeast of Dodsons Crossroads, North Carolina. It flows into University Lake in Chapel Hill and then Morgan Creek flows southeast to meet New Hope Creek and forms the New Hope River in the B. Everett Jordan Lake Reservoir in Chatham County.

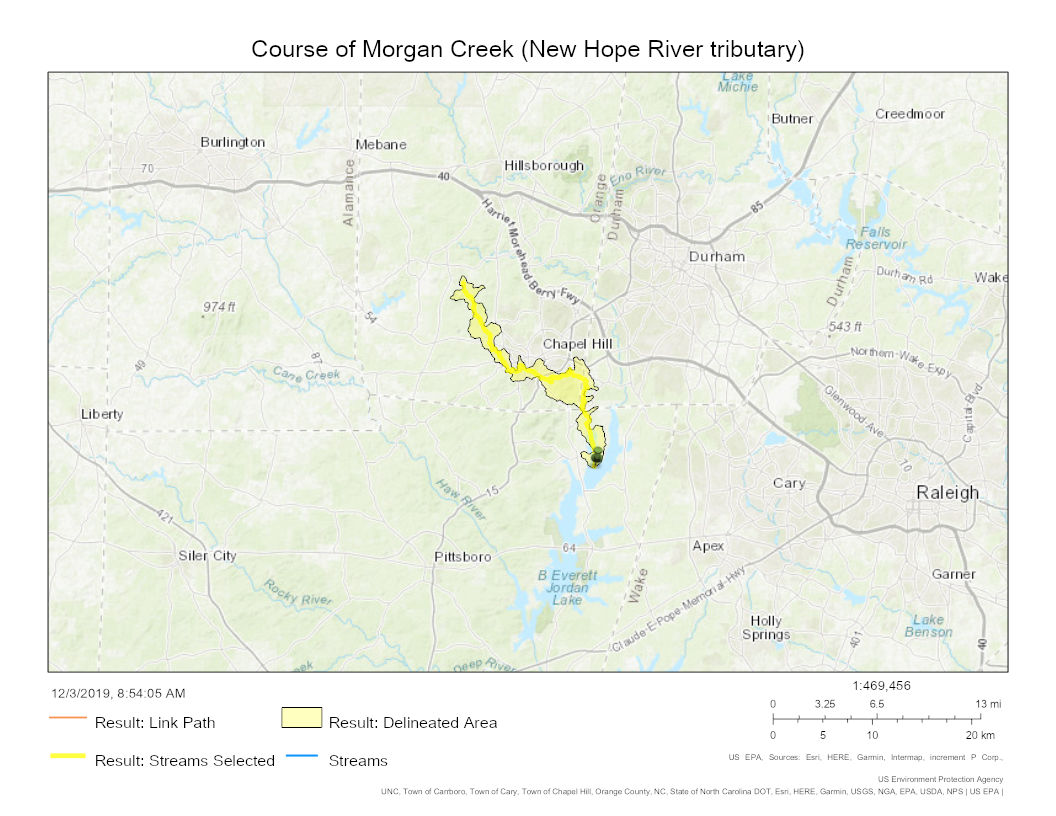
Course of Morgan Creek (New Hope River tributary)

== Watershed ==
Morgan Creek drains 59.67 square miles (154.5 km^{2}) of area, receives about 47.5 in/year of precipitation, has a topographic wetness index of 433.06, and has an average water temperature of 14.91 °C. The watershed is 61% forested.

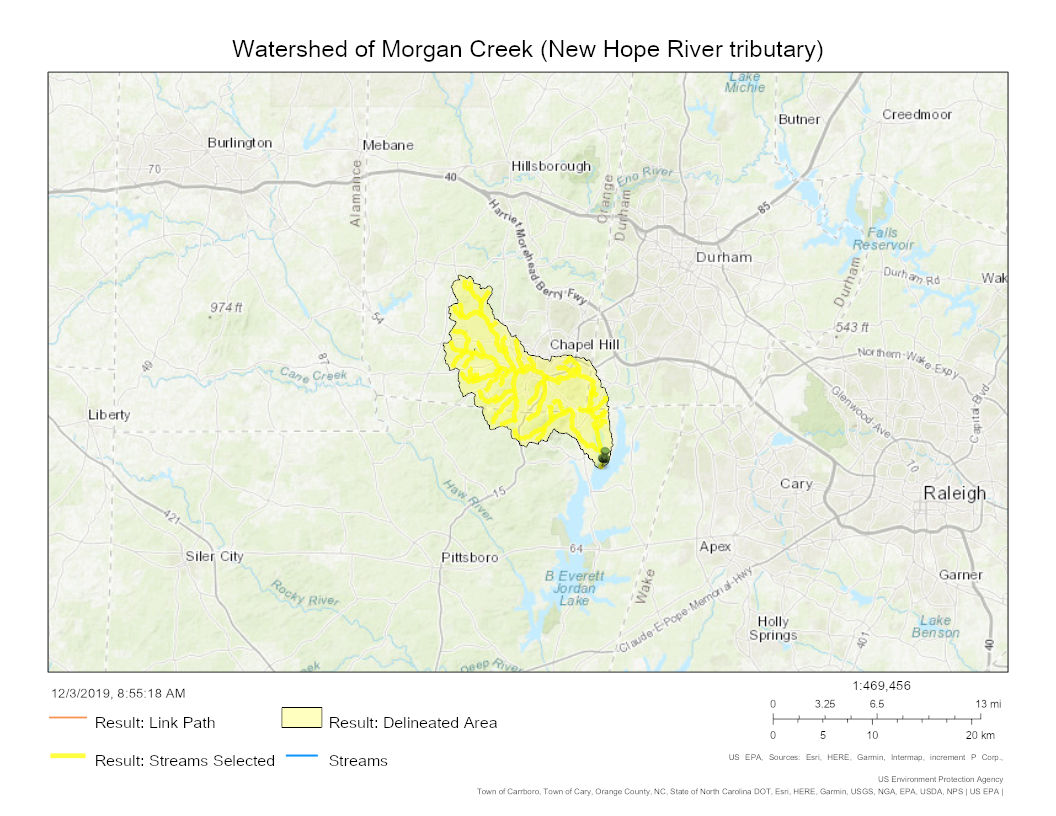
Watershed of Morgan Creek (New Hope River tributary)

== Angling ==
Morgan Creek is open to fishing, in the creek one can find Largemouth Bass, Sunfish, Black Bullhead Catfish, Yellow Bullhead Catfish, Brown Bullhead Catfish, Channel Catfish, Common Carp and most likely fish that are not known about being in Morgan Creek, one need a North Carolina fishing license to fish there unless one are under the age of 16 or you fish on the 4th of July when everyone is exempt.
