= Cane Creek (Haw River tributary, left bank) =

Stream in North Carolina, US

Cane Creek Tributary to Haw River
- Location of Cane Creek mouth Cane Creek (Haw River tributary, left bank) (the United States)

Location
- Country: United States
- State: North Carolina
- County: Alamance; Orange

Physical characteristics
- Source: divide between Cane Creek and Crabtree Creek (Eno River)
  - location: about 2 miles east of Buckhorn, North Carolina
  - coordinates: 36°02′05″N 079°10′24″W
  - elevation: 680 ft (210 m)
- Mouth: Haw River
  - location: about 2 miles east of Eli Whitney, North Carolina
  - coordinates: 35°54′35″N 079°16′06″W
  - elevation: 398 ft (121 m)
- Length: 13.74 mi (22.11 km)
- Basin size: 39.25 square miles (101.7 km^{2})
- Discharge
  - location: Haw River
  - average: 43.21 cu ft/s (1.224 m^{3}/s) at mouth with Haw River

Basin features
- Progression: southwest
- River system: Haw River
- Tributaries
  - left: Watery Fork
  - right: Hog Branch; Turkey Hill Creek; Toms Creek
- Bridges: Borland Road, Arthur Minnis Road, Buckhorn Road, NC 54, Morrow Mill Road

Cane Creek is a 13.74 mi (22.11 km) long 4th order tributary to the Haw River, in Alamance and Orange Counties, North Carolina. This Cane Creek is on the left bank of the Haw River.

== Course ==
Cane Creek rises on the divide between Cane Creek and Crabtree Creek (Eno River) about 2 miles east of Buckhorn, North Carolina in Orange County, North Carolina. Cane Creek then flows southwest meet the Haw River about 2 miles east of Eli Whitney in Alamance County.

== Watershed ==
Cane Creek drains 39.25 square miles (101.7 km^{2}) of area, receives about 46.9 in/year of precipitation, has a topographic wetness index of 415.16 and is about 59% forested.

== See also ==
- List of rivers of North Carolina
- Cane Creek Reservoir
