= Oaks, North Carolina =

- Unincorporated community
- Location of Oaks in North Carolina Oaks, North Carolina (the United States)
- Coordinates: 35°57′13″N 79°15′26″W
- Country: United States
- State: North Carolina
- County: Orange
- Elevation: 594 ft (181 m)
- Time zone: UTC-5 (Eastern (EST))
  - Summer (DST): UTC-4 (EDT)
- Area code: 919
- GNIS feature ID: 1021710

Oaks is an unincorporated community in southwestern Orange County, North Carolina, United States. It is located southwest of Teer.

The Bingham School was listed on the National Register of Historic Places in 1978.
