= Carr, North Carolina =

Carr
- Unincorporated community
- Location within the state of North Carolina
- Coordinates: 36°12′41″N 79°13′12″W
- Country: United States
- State: North Carolina
- County: Orange
- Time zone: UTC-5 (Eastern (EST))
  - Summer (DST): UTC-4 (EDT)
- GNIS feature ID: 982673

Carr is an unincorporated community located northwest of McDade in Orange County, North Carolina, United States. It is built up around the Carr general store. The main activities of this town were tobacco farming and logging.
