= Cedar Grove, Orange County, North Carolina =

Cedar Grove, North Carolina
- Unincorporated community
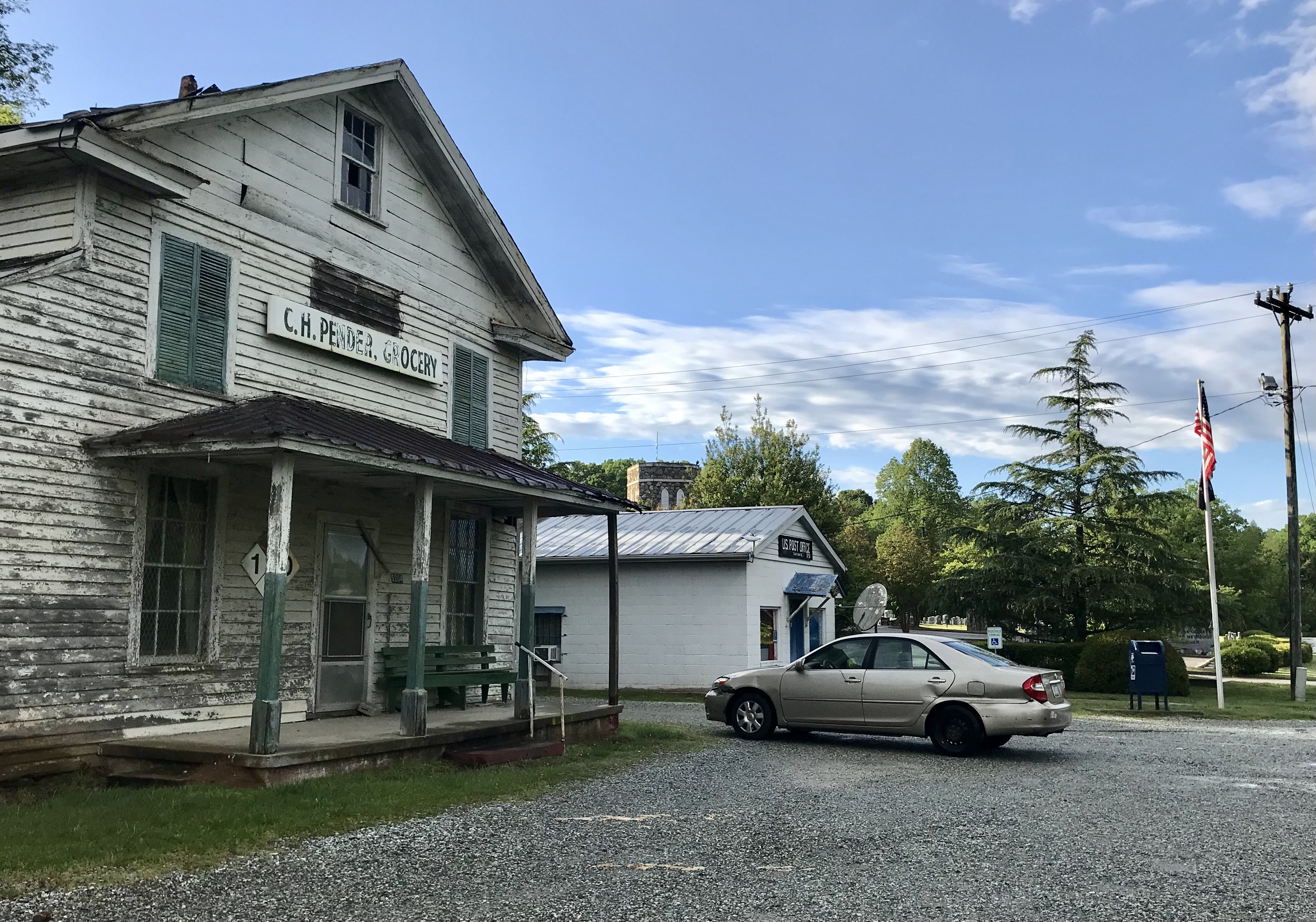
- Cedar Grove Post Office and former grocery store

- Location of Cedar Grove in North Carolina Cedar Grove, North Carolina (the United States)
- Coordinates: 36°10′04″N 79°10′04″W
- Country: United States
- State: North Carolina
- County: Orange
- Elevation: 709 ft (216 m)
- Time zone: UTC-5 (Eastern (EST))
  - Summer (DST): UTC-4 (EDT)
- ZIP code: 27231
- Area code: 919
- FIPS code: 37-37135
- GNIS feature ID: 982828

Cedar Grove is an unincorporated community in Orange County, North Carolina, United States. It is located southeast of McDade, and northwest of Hillsborough.

The Cedar Grove Rural Crossroads Historic District and Capt. John S. Pope Farm are listed on the National Register of Historic Places.

== Gallery ==
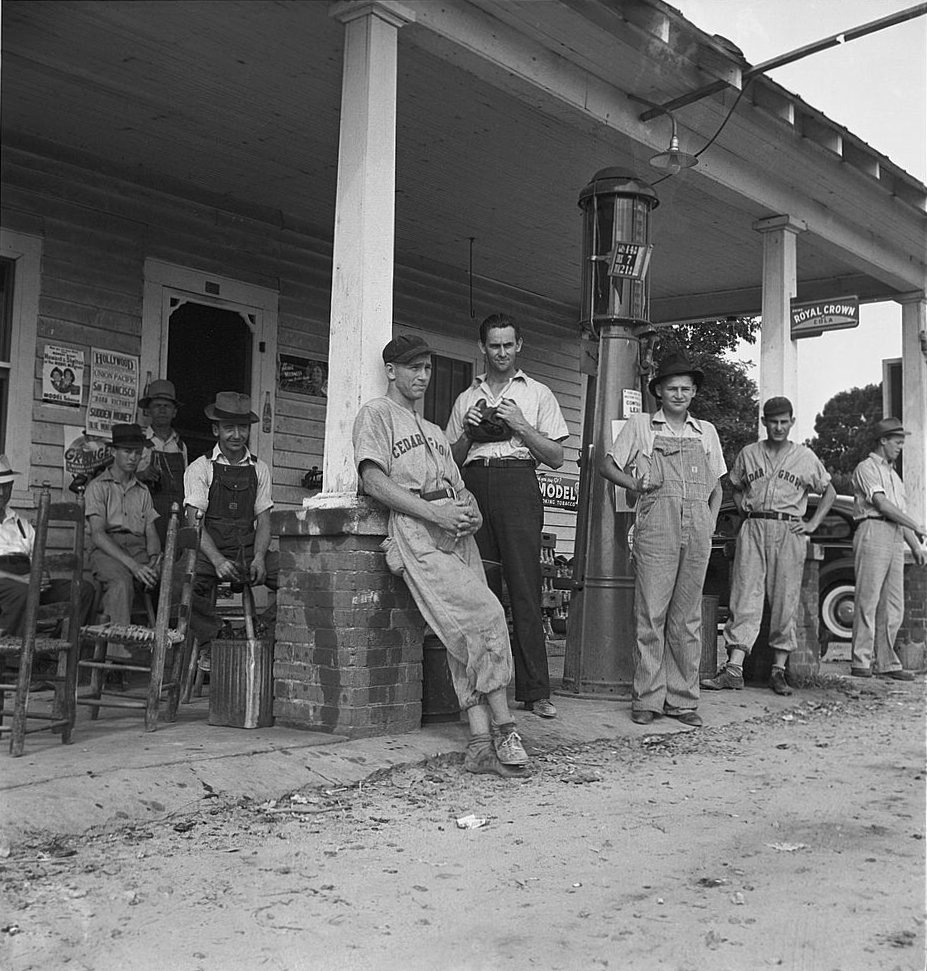
Cedar Grove baseball players at gas station near Chapel Hill, North Carolina on July 4, 1939
