= McDade, North Carolina =

- Unincorporated community
- Location of McDade in North Carolina McDade, North Carolina (the United States)
- Coordinates: 36°11′21″N 79°10′14″W
- Country: United States
- State: North Carolina
- County: Orange
- Elevation: 728 ft (222 m)
- Time zone: UTC-5 (Eastern (EST))
  - Summer (DST): UTC-4 (EDT)
- Area code: 919
- GNIS feature ID: 989555

McDade is an unincorporated community in Orange County, North Carolina, United States, located between Carr and Cedar Grove. It lies at an elevation of 728 feet (222 m).
