= David Faucette House =

Historic house in North Carolina, United States

- U.S. National Register of Historic Places
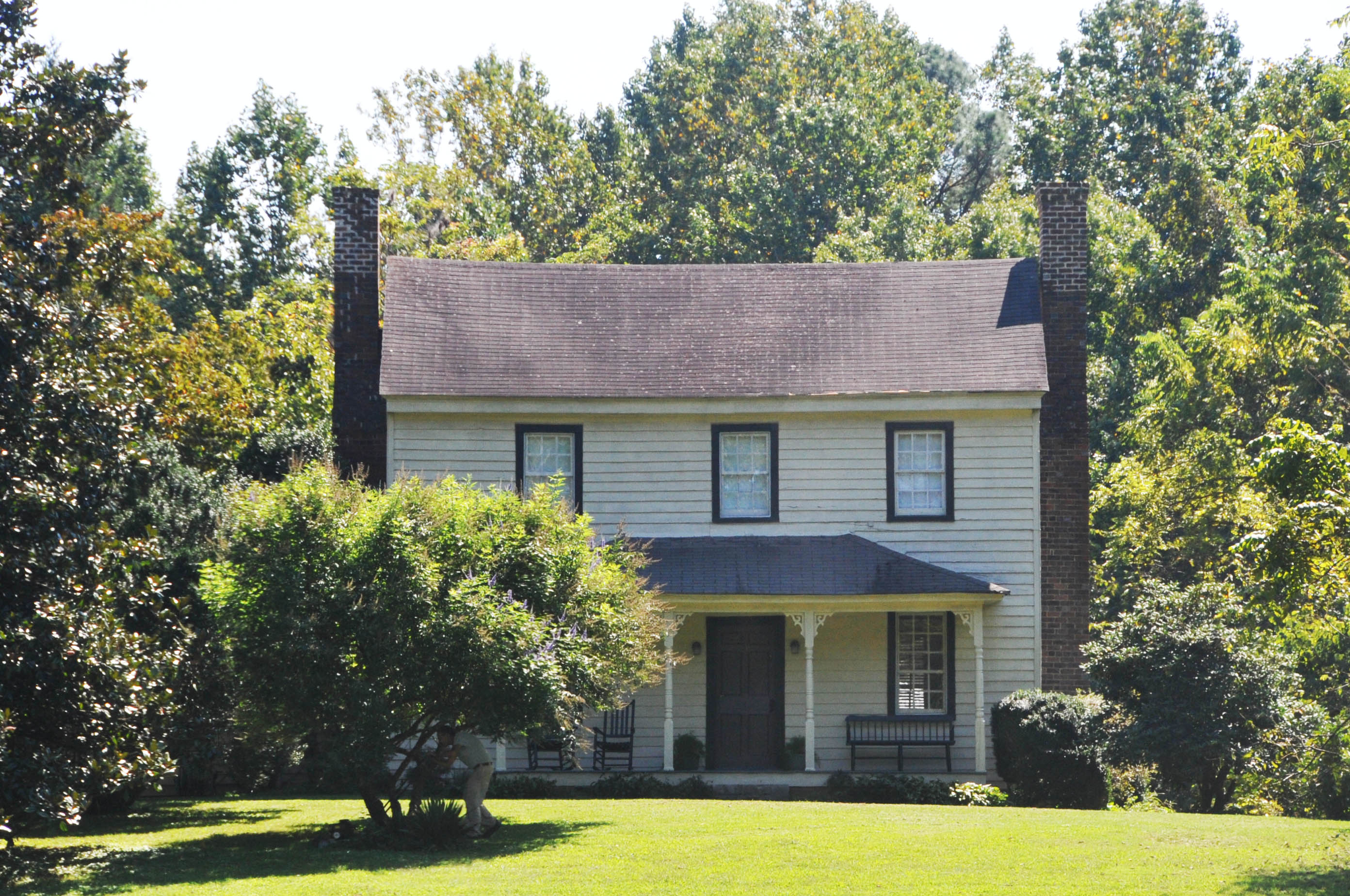
- David Faucette House, March 2007

- Location within North Carolina Location within the United States
- Location: 1830 Hall's Mill Rd., near Efland, North Carolina
- Coordinates: 36°7′21″N 79°9′20″W
- Area: 5.5 acres (2.2 ha)
- Built: c. 1820
- Architectural style: Federal
- NRHP reference No.: 99001391
- Added to NRHP: November 22, 1999

David Faucette House, also known as The Elms and Maude Faucette House, is a historic home located near Efland, Orange County, North Carolina. It was built about 1820, and is a two-story, three-bay, gable-roofed, vernacular Federal style frame farmhouse with a rear kitchen wing and side wing added in the 1970s. It sits on a fieldstone foundation and has flanking exterior brick end chimneys. It features a mid to late-19th century hip-roofed front porch with turned posts and sawn brackets.

It was listed on the National Register of Historic Places in 1999.
