= Hurdle Mills, North Carolina =

Hurdle Mills
- Unincorporated community
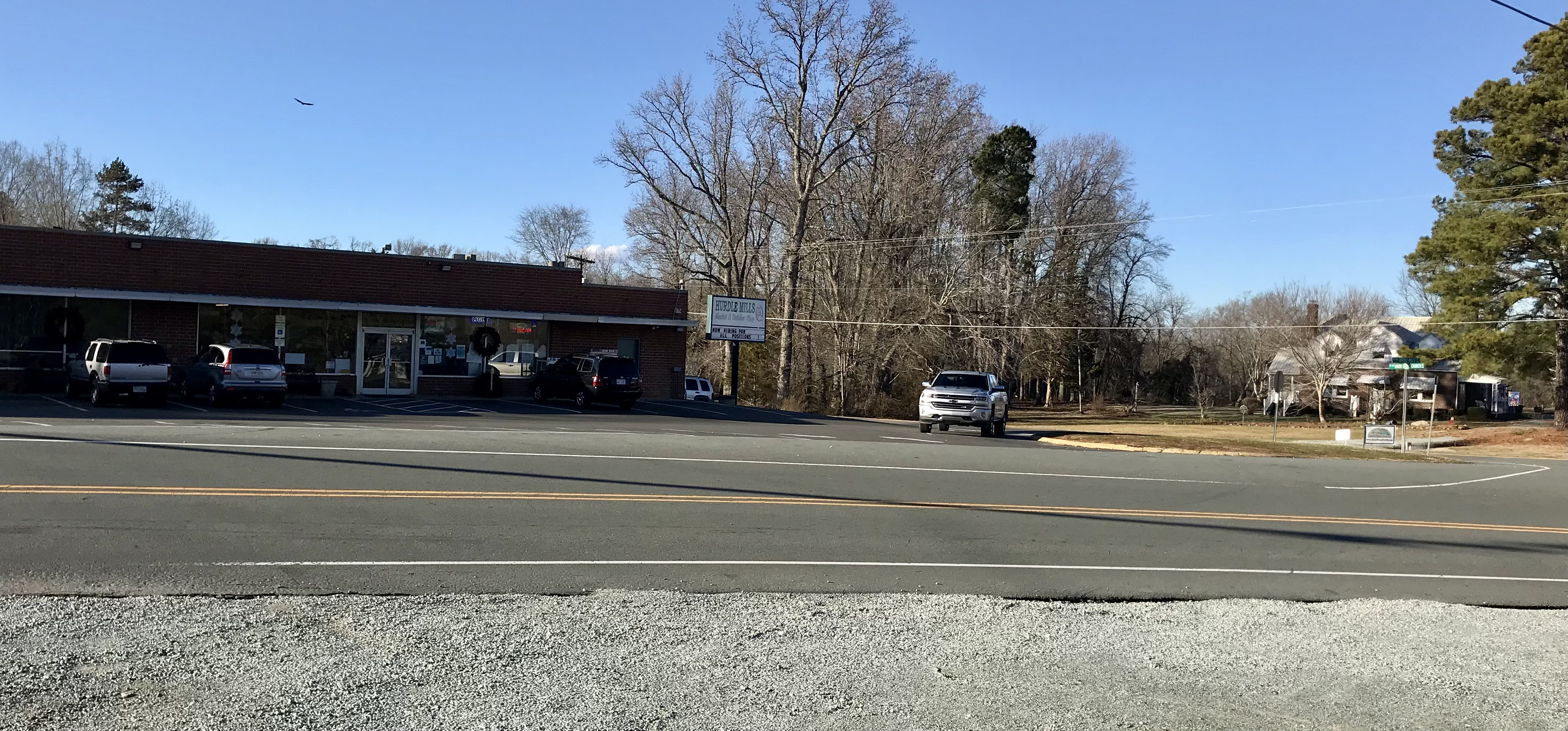

- Location within the state of North Carolina Hurdle Mills (the United States)
- Coordinates: 36°16′24″N 79°2′51″W
- Country: United States
- State: North Carolina
- County: Person
- Elevation: 614 ft (187 m)
- Time zone: UTC-5 (Eastern (EST))
  - Summer (DST): UTC-4 (EDT)
- ZIP codes: 27541
- GNIS feature ID: 987280

Hurdle Mills is an unincorporated community in southern Person County and northern Orange County, North Carolina, United States. It is located on North Carolina Highway 157, southwest of Roxboro, at an elevation of 614 feet (187 m). The population was 3,770 at the 2010 census.

== History ==
Hurdle Mills was originally known as Daniel's Mill, when the post office was established in 1846 with William Daniel as postmaster, and the original mill on the Flat River was built. In 1859, the name was changed to Hurdle's Mill, when the mill was purchased by the Hurdle family. In 1892 the township was renamed Hurdle Mills.

The town has a public park with a picnic shelter, sports field, 1/4 mile walking track, and a playground. It is also home to the Triangle Area Polo Club.
