= Efland, North Carolina =

- Census-designated place
- Location within the state of North Carolina
- Coordinates: 36°04′50″N 79°10′19″W
- Country: United States
- State: North Carolina
- County: Orange

Area
  - Total: 1.79 sq mi (4.64 km^{2})
  - Land: 1.78 sq mi (4.61 km^{2})
  - Water: 0.012 sq mi (0.03 km^{2})
- Elevation: 650 ft (200 m)

Population (2020)
  - Total: 852
  - Density: 478.4/sq mi (184.73/km^{2})
- Time zone: UTC-5 (Eastern (EST))
  - Summer (DST): UTC-4 (EDT)
- ZIP code: 27243
- Area codes: 919 and 984
- FIPS code: 37-20420
- GNIS feature ID: 2628622

Efland is a census-designated place in Orange County, North Carolina, United States. As of the 2020 census, it had a population of 852, up from the 2010 census population of 734.

Efland is located along U.S. Route 70, 3 miles (5 km) west of Hillsborough, the Orange County seat, and 5 miles (8 km) east of Mebane. It is served by exit 160 from Interstate 85. The original name of the Efland community was Green Springs.

Efland Ruritan Club hosts most of the CDP's activities, including an annual rodeo and the 4th of July and Christmas parades. The club was charted on December 7, 1981, and Ben Lloyd (former County Commissioner and Farmer) was its first president.

Efland has two schools, Efland-Cheeks Elementary School and Gravelly Hill Middle School. Located next to Gravelly Hill MS on West Ten Road is an Orange County soccer facility. The Soccer.Com Center offers 5 full size soccer fields, 1 practice soccer field, a walking track, a concession building and restroom facilities.

The David Faucette House was listed on the National Register of Historic Places in 1999.

== Demographics ==
Historical population
Census	Pop.	Note	%±
2020	852		—
U.S. Decennial Census
