= Orange Water and Sewer Authority =

Carrboro utility company

- Abbreviation: OWASA
- Formation: 1977; 49 years ago
- Headquarters: Carrboro, North Carolina
- Region served: Carrboro, North Carolina and Chapel Hill, North Carolina
- Services: Water treatment, provision, and sewage
- Website: https://www.owasa.org/

The Orange Water and Sewer Authority is a nonprofit public utility that provides water and sewage services to the Carrboro-Chapel Hill area. It gets its water from Cane Creek Reservoir, University Lake, and Quarry Reservoir. OWASA has 343 miles of water mains and 294 miles of sewers. Its water is treated at the Jones Ferry Road Water Treatment Plant.

The organization was founded in 1977, to plan and manage Orange County's water supply after the county had experienced years of recurring droughts. OWASA has a rolling 5-year capital improvement plan for investment.
