= Caldwell, Orange County, North Carolina =

Caldwell, North Carolina
- Unincorporated community
- Location of Caldwell in North Carolina Caldwell, North Carolina (the United States)
- Coordinates: 36°11′24″N 79°01′02″W
- Country: United States
- State: North Carolina
- County: Orange
- Elevation: 620 ft (190 m)
- Time zone: UTC-5 (Eastern (EST))
  - Summer (DST): UTC-4 (EDT)
- Area code: 919
- GNIS feature ID: 1006153

Caldwell is an unincorporated community in Orange County, North Carolina, United States. It is located at the junction of North Carolina Highway 57 and North Carolina Highway 157, northeast of Schley. Only a rural crossroads, it is the most significant community on fifteen mile stretches of both highways.

Caldwell is famous for the annual Fourth of July Parade that starts at the Caldwell Fire Department and ends at the Caldwell Community Center.

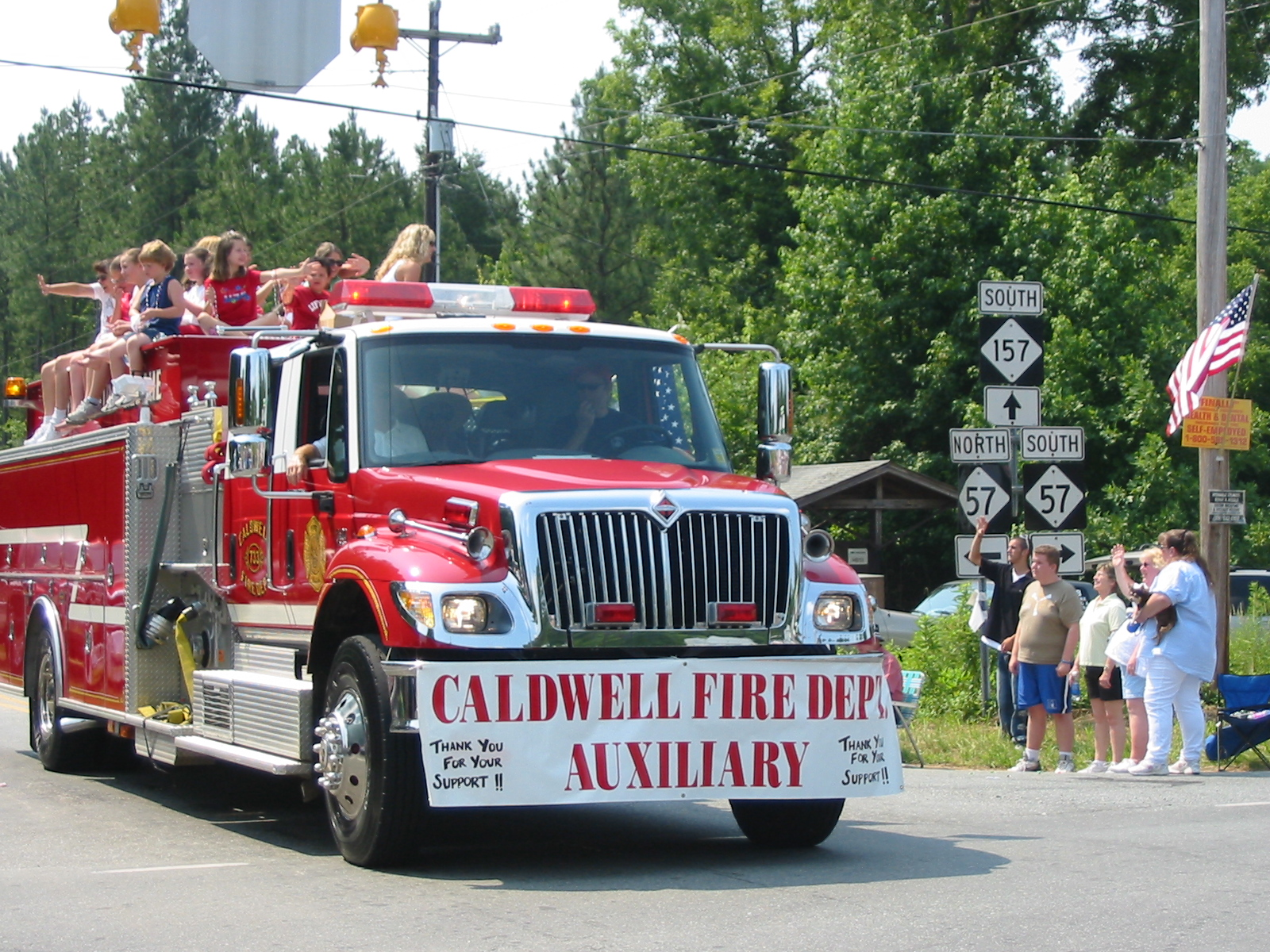
Caldwell 4 July Parade, 2007

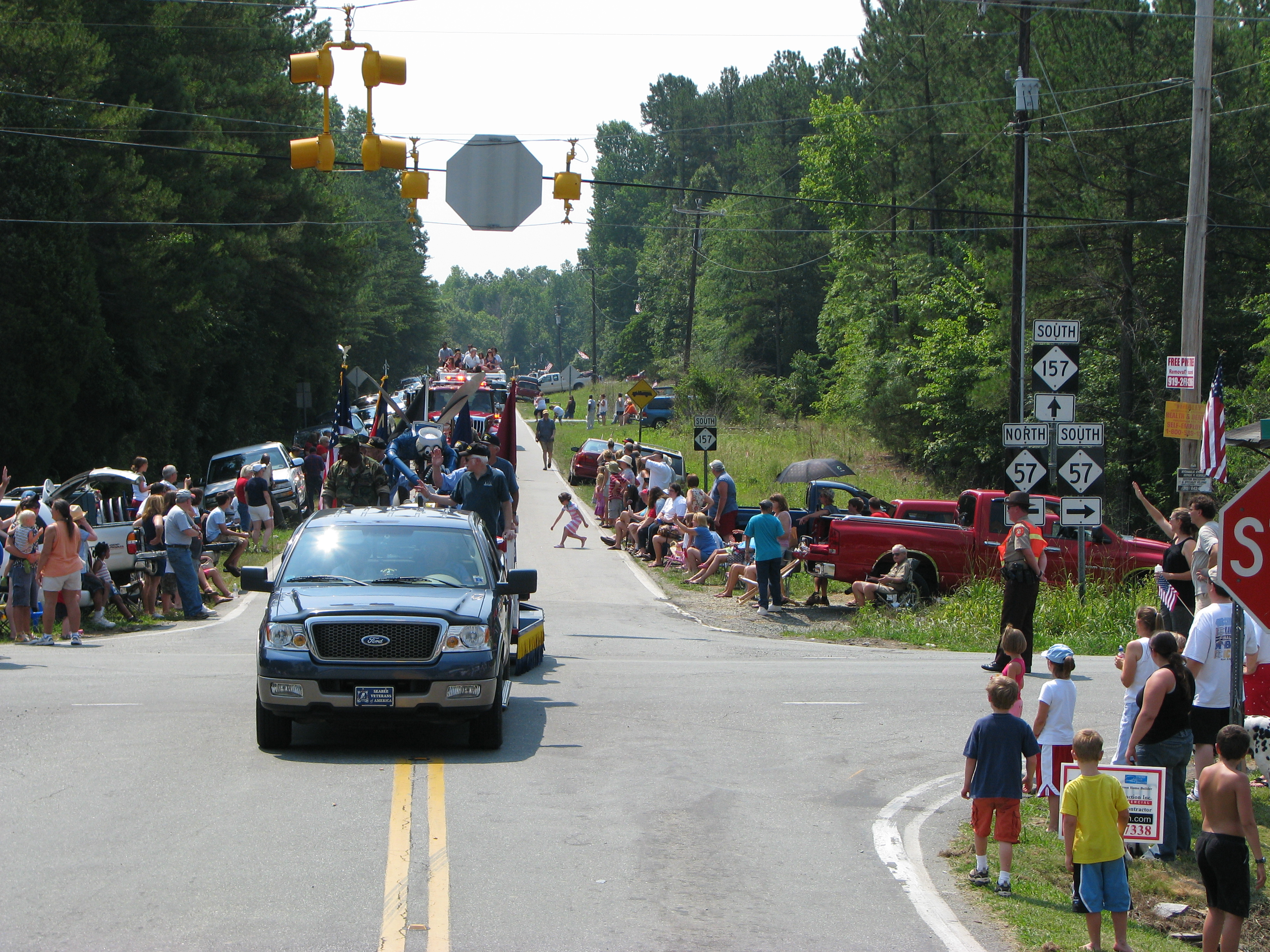
Caldwell 4 July Parade, 2008

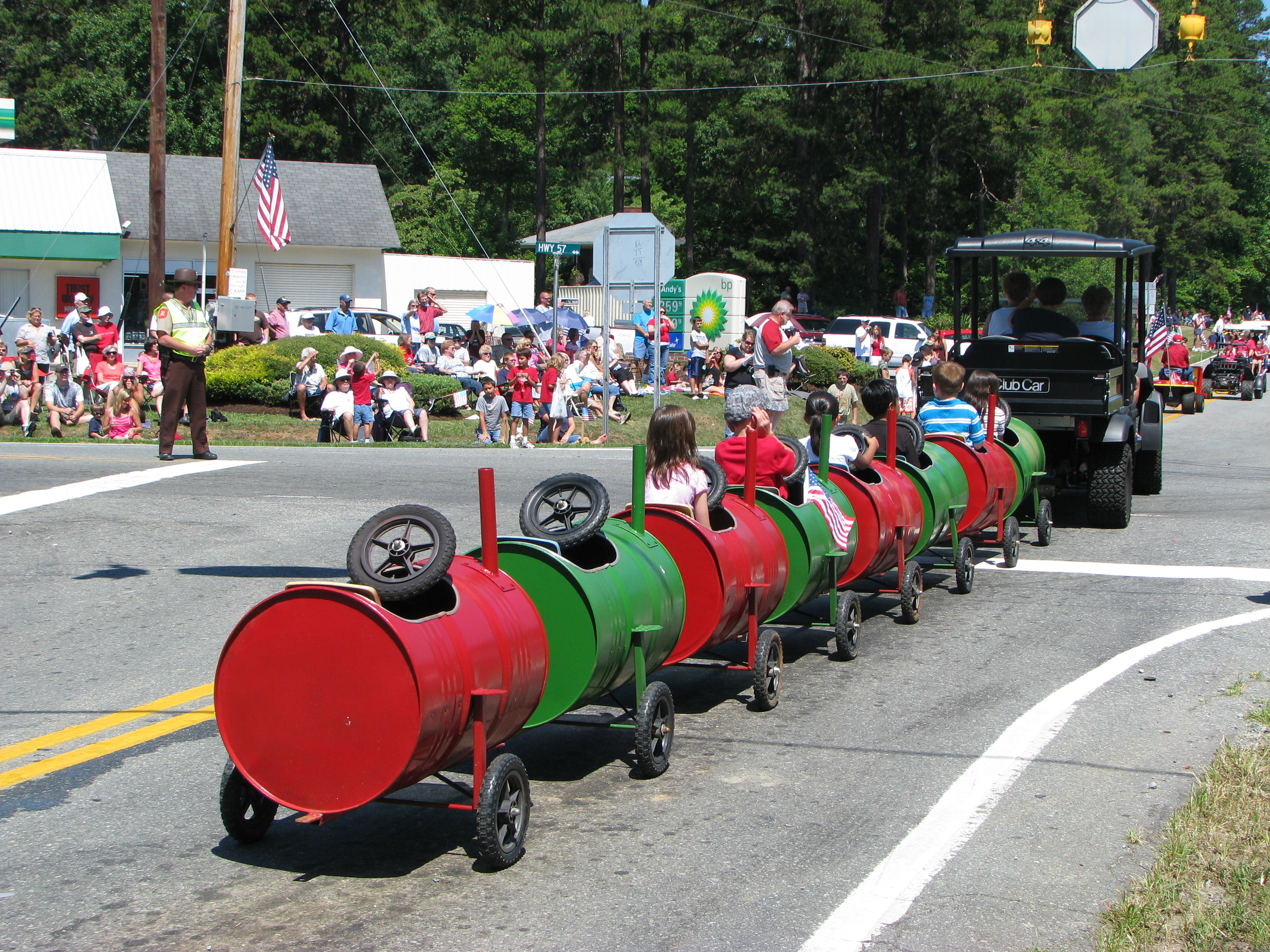
Caldwell 4 July Parade, 2010

The Dr. Arch Jordan House was listed on the National Register of Historic Places in 1998.
