= North Carolina Highway 157 =

State highway in North Carolina, US

North Carolina Highway 157
- NC 157 highlighted in red

Route information
- Maintained by NCDOT
- Length: 29.3 mi (47.2 km)
- Existed: 1948–present

Major junctions
- South end: I-85 / US 15 / US 70 / US 501 in Durham
- NC 57 in Caldwell
- North end: US 158 / US 501 / NC 57 in Roxboro

Location
- Country: United States
- State: North Carolina
- Counties: Durham, Orange, Person

Highway system
- North Carolina Highway System; Interstate; US; State; Scenic
← NC 153	→ US 158

North Carolina Highway 157 (NC 157) is a 29.3-mile-long (47.2 km) primary state highway in the U.S. state of North Carolina. The highway runs in a north–south direction from Interstate 85 (I-85), U.S. Route 15 (US 15), US 70, and US 501 in Durham, to US 158, US 501, and NC 57 in Roxboro. The highway serves the cities of Durham and Roxboro, along with the communities of Caldwell and Hurdle Mills. NC 157 is named Guess Road between its southern terminus and Hurdle Mills, and Hurdle Mills Road between Hurdle Mills and the Roxboro city limits. NC 157 does not directly parallel US 501, however, the two highways generally follow a similar alignment between Durham and Roxboro. NC 157 serves the counties of Durham, Orange, and Person.

Much of the alignment of NC 157 were formerly secondary roads linking Durham, Caldwell, Hurdle Mills and Roxboro. NC 157 was established in 1948, running from NC 57 in Caldwell to US 158, US 501, and NC 57 in Roxboro. The route was formerly part of NC 57, which was adjusted in 1948, to follow its current alignment between Caldwell and Roxboro. In April 1987, NC 157 was extended south along Guess Road from Caldwell to its modern-day southern terminus at I-85. The routing of NC 157 has remained the same since 1987.

== Route description ==
NC 157 begins at a diamond interchange with I-85, US 15, US 70, and US 501 (I-85 exit 175) in northern Durham. The highway proceeds north along Guess Road. Guess Road also continues south as a secondary road to Club Boulevard. North of the interchange, the adjacent properties are primarily commercial businesses while several intersecting streets lead to residential neighborhoods. Beginning at Ellen Street, the properties along NC 157 change from commercial to residential buildings. As NC 157 continues north, it intersects Horton Road where several shopping centers and strip malls are located. North of the intersection, NC 157 turns to the northwest and passes a Durham County Correctional Facility located to the east. NC 157 continues for northwestward for one-half mile (0.80 km) before turning to the northeast and crossing the Eno River. As NC 157 continues north of Durham, it runs through the suburbs and exurbs in northern Durham County. North of the Eno River, the surroundings become increasingly rural as the highway runs adjacent to many residential neighborhoods with forested areas. NC 157 makes a turn to the northwest near Milton Road, an orientation it maintains until reaching Caldwell. The highway briefly runs adjacent to and then crosses the South Fork Little River. North of the river crossing, the surrounding area transforms from residential neighborhoods to rural farmland mixed with forested area. NC 157 continues 0.3 miles (0.48 km) northwest of the river before crossing into Orange County.

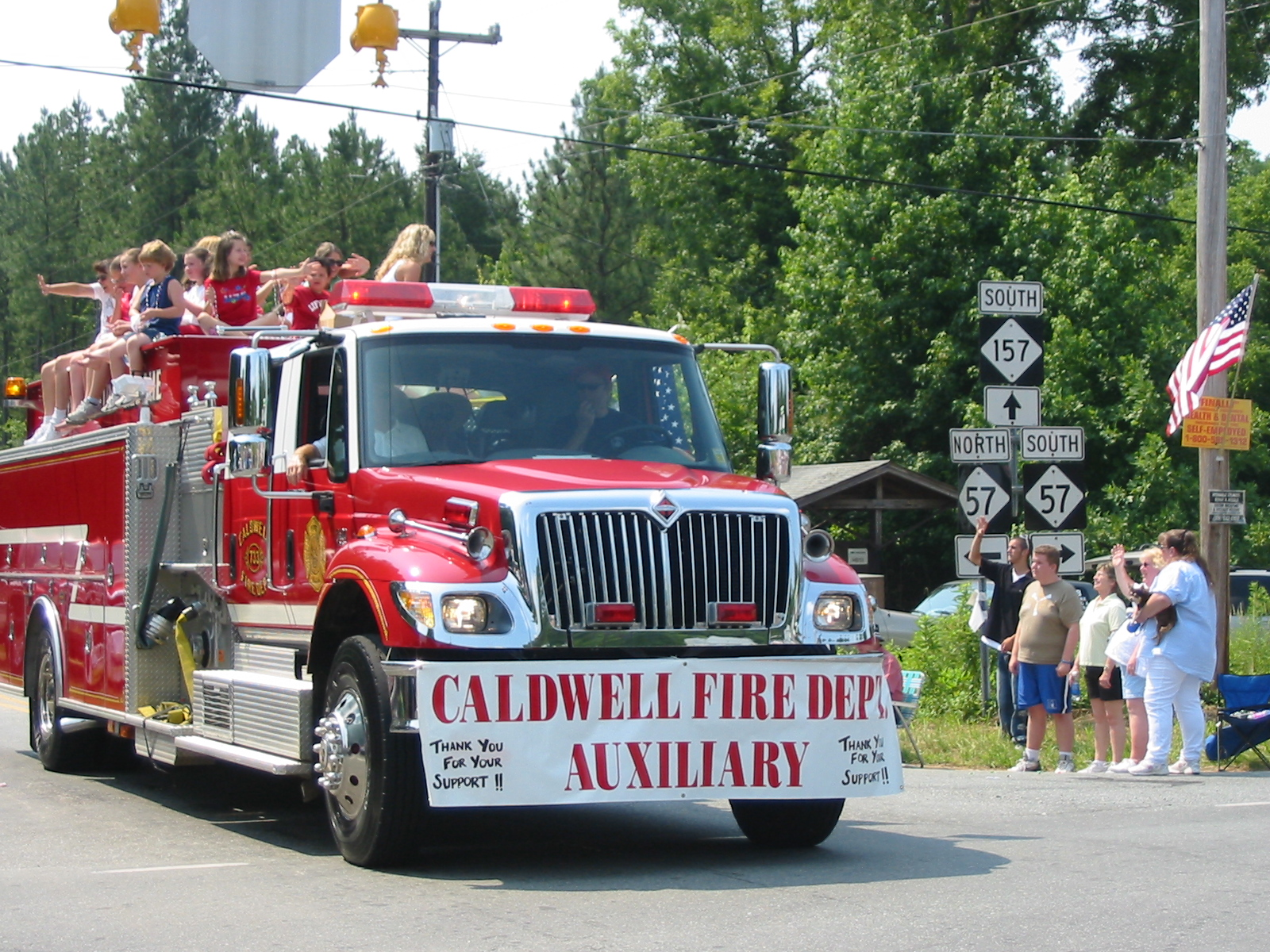
An Independence Day parade along NC 157 at the NC 57 intersection.

After crossing into Orange County, NC 157 runs adjacent to the Little River Regional Park and Natural Area. NC 157 generally continues to the northwest, with several curves that adjust its orientation. The highway crosses the North Fork Little River before turning northward toward Caldwell. NC 157 meets NC 57 at an at-grade intersection in the unincorporated community of Caldwell. Between NC 57 and Barry Road, NC 157 generally follows a northerly alignment. NC 157 diverges to the northwest at Barry Road and enters Person County 0.7 miles (1.1 km) northwest of the intersection. After crossing into Person County, NC 157 continues to follow a northwestward orientation until reaching Hurdle Mills. Nearing Hurdle Mills, the highway begins to parallel the Flat River and begins to pass residential neighborhoods. The highway enters Hurdle Mills from the southeast, intersecting Hurdle Mills Road at an at-grade T-intersection. At the intersection, NC 157 turns to the northeast to follow Hurdle Mills Road toward Roxboro. As it exits the community, NC 157 crosses the Flat River. North of Hurdle Mills, the highway primarily runs through a rural area with several farms and multiple forested areas. As NC 157 approaches Roxboro, it runs adjacent to several residential neighborhoods located near the highway. Southwest of Roxboro, the highway meets Wrenn Crumpton Road and Patterson Drive at a four-way stop intersection. Wrenn Crumpton Road runs west to NC 49 while Patterson Drive runs east to US 501 and NC 57. As NC 157 enters into Roxboro from the southeast, the road name changes from Hurdle Mills Road to Main Street. The highway continues for one mile (1.6 km) through a residential area of southern Roxboro. NC 157 then reaches its northern terminus at an intersection with US 158, US 501, and NC 57 south of downtown Roxboro.

The North Carolina Department of Transportation (NCDOT) measures average daily traffic volumes along many of the roadways it maintains. In 2016, average daily traffic volumes along NC 157 varied from 31,000 vehicles per day south of US 158, US 501, and NC 57 in Roxboro to 1,100 vehicles per day south of Holeman Ashley Road (SR 1119). No section of NC 157 is included in the National Highway System, a network of highways in the United States which serve strategic transportation facilities. However, the highway does connect to the National Highway System at I-85, US 15, US 70, and US 501 in Durham and US 158, US 501, and NC 57 in Roxboro.

== History ==
By 1930, the roads which comprise-modern day NC 157 existed as secondary roads. A section of modern-day Guess Road between Durham and Horton Road was paved by 1930. The remaining roads were either graded, gravel, or unimproved roads. By 1935, NC 57 was signed along secondary roads from Hillsborough to Roxboro. NC 57 followed its modern alignment between Hillsborough and Caldwell, and then followed modern-day Guess Road and Hurdle Mills Road to Roxboro. In 1935, the entirety of NC 57 was classified as a gravel or topsoil road. By 1936, NC 57 between Hillsbourgh and Roxboro was considered a hard-surface road on county maps, but was not paved according to the 1936 state transportation map. By 1940, NC 57 was paved between Hillsbourough and the South Fork Little River and between Hurdle Mills and Roxboro. By 1944, much of modern-day NC 157 was paved. Guess Road between Durham and Crooked Creek in Durham County was classified as a "high-type" paved road. Two segments, one between Crooked Creek and Caldwell and another between Hurdle Mills and Roxboro were a bituminous surface road. The segment of highway between Caldwell and Hurdle Mills remained a graded road. NC 57 was relocated north of Caldwell in 1948. From Caldwell, NC 57 continued northeast until reaching US 501 north of Rougemont. From the intersection, NC 57 ran concurrently with US 501 to Roxboro.

In 1948, NC 157 was established along the former alignment of NC 57 running along Guess Road and Hurdle Mills Road from Caldwell to Roxboro. The southern terminus was located at NC 57 in Caldwell and the northern terminus was located at US 158, US 501, and NC 57 in Roxboro. Much of NC 157 was paved at the time of its establishment, with the exception of a segment between Caldwell and the Orange–Person County line. By 1951, all of NC 157 was paved with the completion of the Caldwell to Person county segment. On April 13, 1987, NC 157 was extended south by 14.2 miles (22.9 km) to Durham. The southern terminus of NC 157 was moved to I-85 in Durham and NC 157 followed Guess Road to Caldwell. The routing of NC 157 has remained the same since 1987.

== Major intersections ==
County	Location	mi	km	Destinations	Notes
Durham	Durham	0.0	0.0	I-85 / US 15 / US 70 / US 501 / Guess Road – Oxford, Greensboro	Southern terminus; exit 175 (I-85); diamond interchange
Orange	Caldwell	14.2	22.9	NC 57 – Rougemont, Hillsborough	
Person	Roxboro	29.3	47.2	US 158 / US 501 / NC 57 (Durham Road)	Northern terminus
1.000 mi = 1.609 km; 1.000 km = 0.621 mi
