= University Lake =

Manmade lake in North Carolina

- Location within North Carolina Location within the United States
- Interactive map of University Lake
- Location: University of North Carolina at Chapel Hill; Carrboro, North Carolina
- Coordinates: 35°53′47″N 79°05′39″W
- Type: Artificial lake/Reservoir
- Primary inflows: Morgan Creek
- Primary outflows: Phil's Creek, Neville Creek, Price Creek, and Pritchard's Mill Creek
- Basin countries: United States
- Managing agency: Orange Water and Sewer Authority
- Built: 1932
- Surface area: 213 acres (86 ha)
- Water volume: 600,000,000 US gallons (2.3×10^{9} L; 500,000,000 imp gal)
- Surface elevation: 348 feet (106 m)
- References: U.S. Geological Survey Geographic Names Information System: University Lake

University Lake is a manmade freshwater lake in Carrboro, North Carolina. The University of North Carolina at Chapel Hill created the lake in 1932 by building two dams, at the confluence of the Morgan Creek, Phil's Creek, Neville Creek, Price Creek, and Pritchard's Mill Creek. Marshes occur where the creeks meet with the lake, and this serves as environment for wildlife such as various species of waterfowl.

It was originally built to act as a water reservoir for UNC's campus, and the neighboring communities of Carrboro and Chapel Hill. Severe droughts in the 1960s and 1970s lowered the water level, and it soon became necessary for a new reservoir to be built to complement University Lake. It was the sole source of water to the Orange Water and Sewer Authority until the Cane Creek Reservoir was built. The lake is open in the summer for public fishing and recreation. The UNC women's rowing team also trains on the lake.
