= USS Schley =

Two ships of the United States Navy have been named Schley after Rear Admiral Winfield Scott Schley.

- The first Schley (SS-52/SF-1), an early fleet submarine, was laid down as USS Schley and renamed AA-1 before commissioning. She was later renamed T-1 and served between 1920 and 1922.
- The second Schley (DD-103) was a destroyer that served between 1918 and 1945.
