= Schley, North Carolina =

Schley
- Unincorporated community,
- Location within the state of North Carolina
- Coordinates: 36°09′10″N 79°03′41″W
- Country: United States
- State: North Carolina
- County: Orange
- Elevation: 584 ft (178 m)
- Time zone: UTC-5 (Eastern (EST))
  - Summer (DST): UTC-4 (EDT)
- GNIS feature ID: 994411

Schley (pronounced Sly) is an unincorporated community, in Orange County, North Carolina, United States, located southwest of Caldwell and northeast of Hillsborough. It lies at an elevation of 584 feet (178 m).

One of the main landmarks in the area is the Schley Grange Hall at the intersection of Hwy 57 and Schley Road. Schley has a very active farming community.

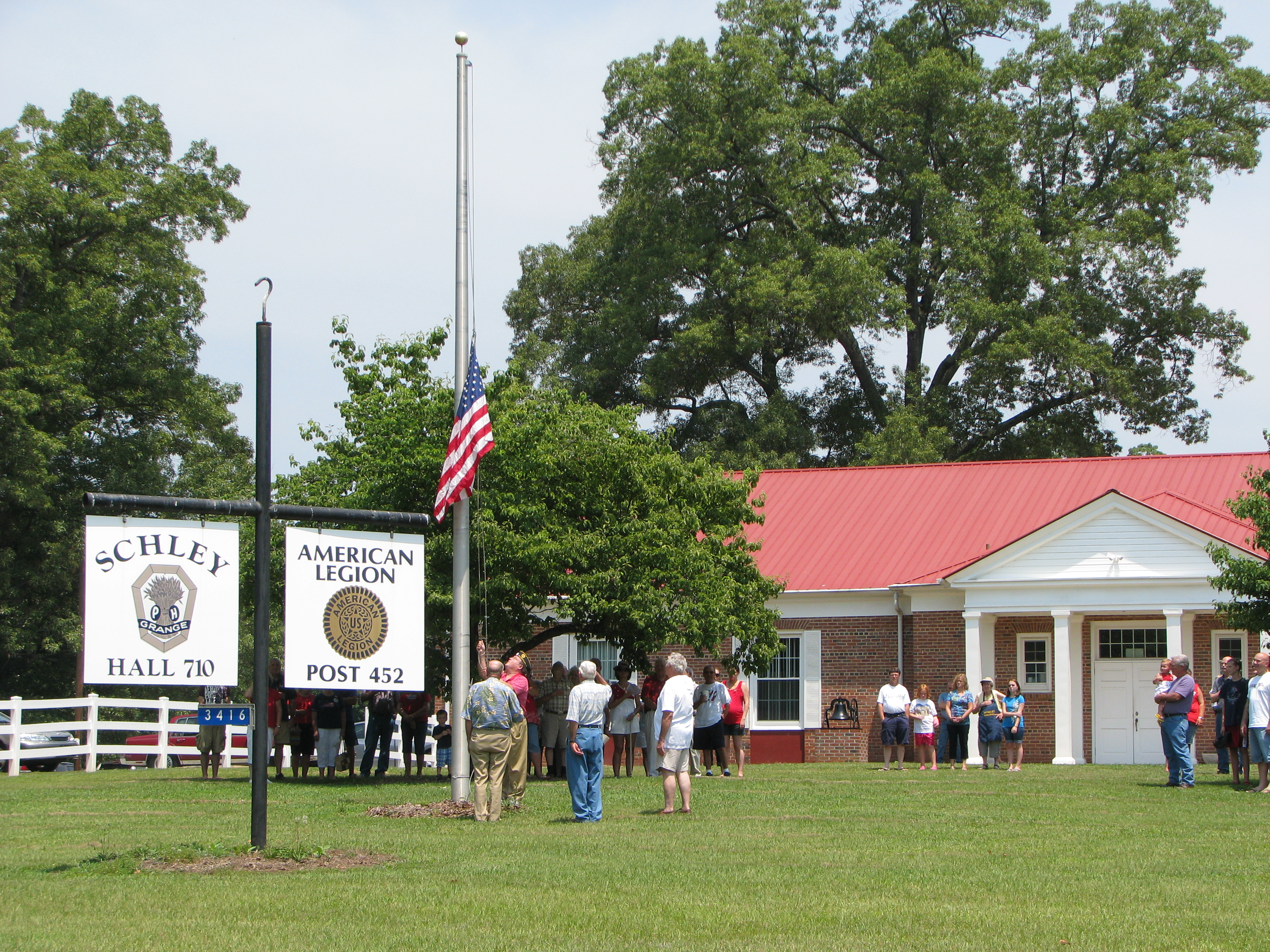
Schley Grange Hall on the 4th of July.
