= Orange County, North Carolina =

County in North Carolina, United States

- County
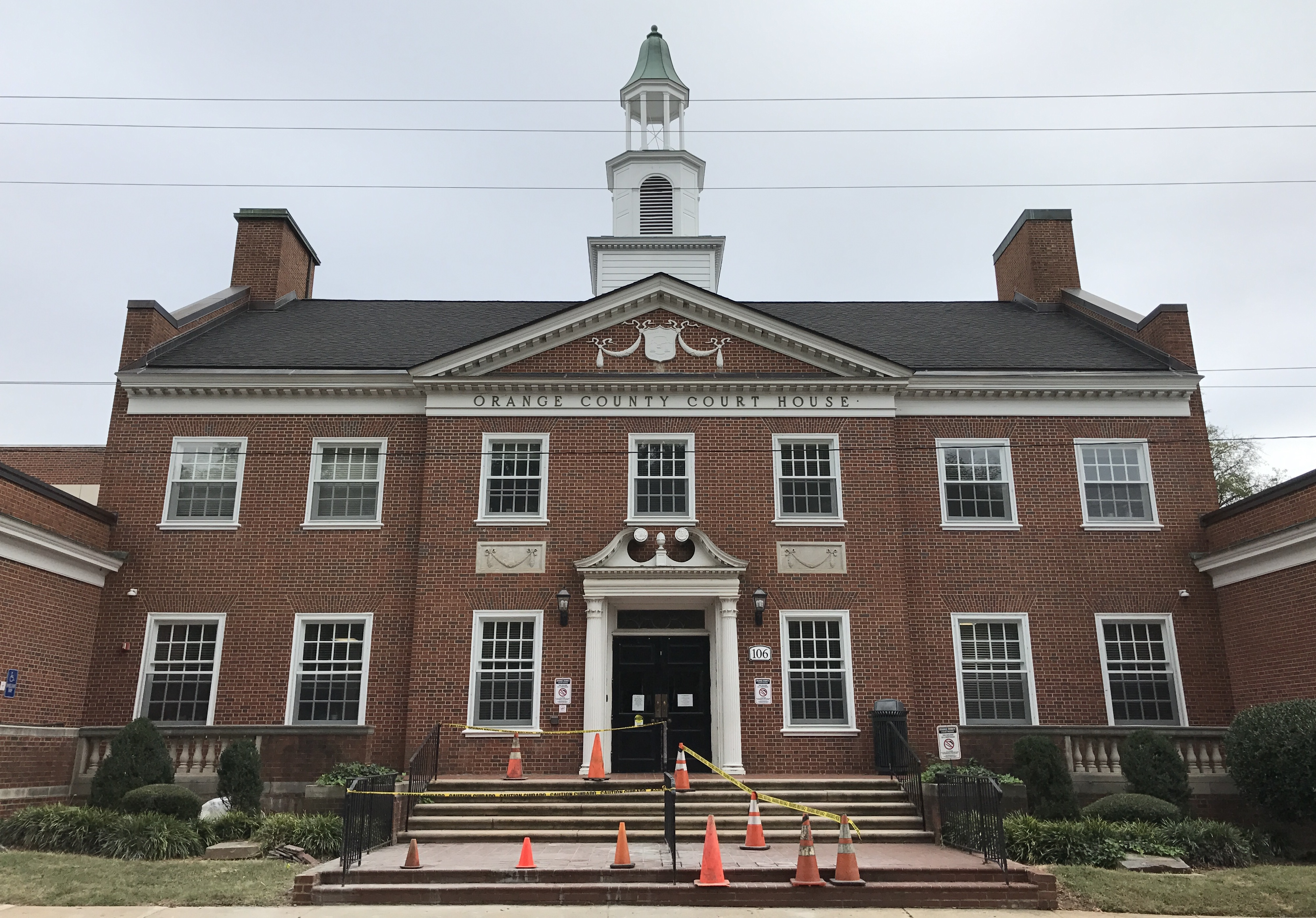
- Orange County Courthouse

- Flag Seal Logo

- Location within the U.S. state of North Carolina
- Coordinates: 36.06°N 79.12°W
- Country: United States
- State: North Carolina
- Founded: 1752
- Named for: Unknown; possibly William V of Orange or William of Orange
- Seat: Hillsborough
- Largest community: Chapel Hill

Area
  - Total: 400.96 sq mi (1,038.5 km^{2})
  - Land: 397.56 sq mi (1,029.7 km^{2})
  - Water: 3.40 sq mi (8.8 km^{2}) 0.85%

Population (2020)
  - Total: 148,696
  - Estimate (2025): 152,498 ▲
  - Density: 374.02/sq mi (144.41/km^{2})
- Time zone: UTC−5 (Eastern)
  - Summer (DST): UTC−4 (EDT)
- Congressional district: 4th
- Website: orangecountync.gov

Orange County is a county located in the Piedmont region of the U.S. state of North Carolina. As of the 2020 census, the population was 148,696. Its county seat is the city of Hillsborough.

Orange County is included in the Durham–Chapel Hill, NC Metropolitan Statistical Area, which is also included in the Raleigh–Durham–Cary, NC Combined Statistical Area, which had an estimated population of 2,368,947 in 2023.

== History ==
Orange County was formed in 1752 from parts of Bladen, Granville, and Johnston counties. While no surviving records exist regarding the namesake of the county, it may have been named for the infant William V of Orange, whose mother Anne, daughter of King George II of Great Britain, was then regent of the Dutch Republic; or William of Orange, who became William III of England after the overthrow of James II in the Glorious Revolution.

In 1771, Orange County was greatly reduced in area. The western part of it was combined with the eastern part of Rowan County to form Guilford County. Another part was combined with parts of Cumberland County and Johnston County to form Wake County. The southern part of what remained became Chatham County.

In 1777, the northern half of what was left of Orange County became Caswell County. In 1849, the western county became Alamance County. Finally, in 1881, the eastern half of the county's remaining territory was combined with part of Wake County to form Durham County.

Some of the first settlers of the county were English Quakers, who settled along the Haw and Eno rivers. Arguably, the earliest settlers in the county were the Andrews family, which would later intermarry with the Lloyd family.

=== Colonial period and Revolutionary War ===
The Orange County seat of Hillsborough was founded in 1754 on land where the Great Indian Trading Path crossed the Eno River. This area was first owned, surveyed, and mapped by William Churton (a surveyor for Earl Granville). Originally to be named Orange, it was named Corbin Town (for Francis Corbin, a member of the governor's council and one of Granville's land agents), and renamed Childsburgh (in honor of Thomas Child, the attorney general for North Carolina from 1751 to 1760 and another one of Granville's land agents) in 1759. In 1766, it was named Hillsborough, after Wills Hill, then the Earl of Hillsborough, the British secretary of state for the colonies, and a relative of royal Governor William Tryon.

Located in the Piedmont region, Hillsborough was the site of a colonial court, and the scene of some pre-Revolutionary War tensions. In the late 1760s, conflicts between Piedmont farmers and county officers welled up in the Regulator movement, or as it was also known, the War of the Regulation, which had its epicenter in Hillsborough. Several thousand people from North Carolina, mainly from Orange, Anson, and Granville counties in the western region, were extremely dissatisfied with the wealthy colonial officials whom they considered cruel, arbitrary, tyrannical, and corrupt.

With specie scarce, many inland farmers were cash poor and unable to pay their taxes; they resented the consequent seizure of their property. In addition, local sheriffs sometimes kept taxes for their own gain and sometimes charged twice for the same tax. At times, sheriffs would intentionally remove records of their tax collection to further tax citizens. Rowan, Anson, Orange, Granville, and Cumberland counties were said to be most affected by such corruption. It was a struggle of yeomen farmers and other mostly lower-class citizens, who made up the majority of the population of North Carolina, and the wealthy ruling class, who composed about 5% of the population, yet maintained almost total control of the government. Of the 8,000 people living in Orange County at the time, an estimated 6,000 to 7,000 of them supported the Regulators.

Governor William Tryon's conspicuous consumption in the construction of a new governor's mansion at New Bern fueled resentment of the movement's members. As the western districts were under-represented in the colonial legislature, the farmers could not obtain redress by legislative means. Ultimately, the frustrated farmers took to arms and closed the court in Hillsborough, dragging those they saw as corrupt officials through the streets and cracking the church bell. Tryon sent troops from his militia to the region, and defeated the Regulators at the Battle of Alamance in May 1771. Several trials were held after the war, resulting in the hanging of six Regulators at Hillsborough on June 19, 1771.

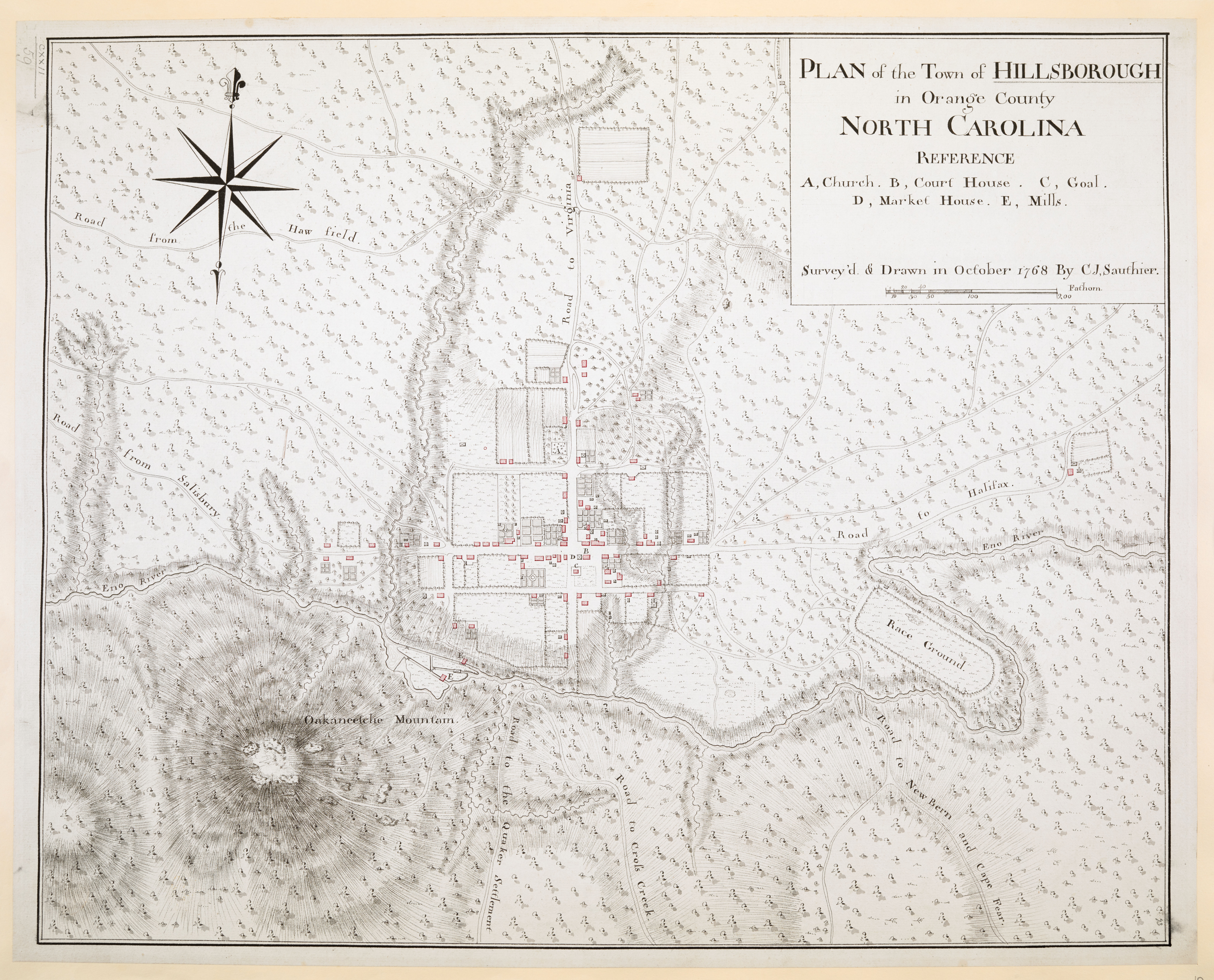
An early map of Hillsborough produced in 1768 by Claude J. Sauthier

Hillsborough was used as the home of the North Carolina state legislature during the American Revolution. Hillsborough served as a military base by British General Charles Cornwallis in late February 1781. The United States Constitution, drafted in 1787, was controversial in North Carolina. Delegate meetings at Hillsboro in July 1788 initially voted to reject it for Anti-Federalist reasons. They were persuaded to change their minds partly by the strenuous efforts of James Iredell and William Davie and partly by the prospect of adding a Bill of Rights. The Constitution was later ratified by North Carolina at a convention in Fayetteville.

William Hooper, a signer of the Declaration of Independence, was buried in the Presbyterian Church cemetery in October 1790. His remains were later reinterred at Guilford Courthouse Military Battlefield. His original gravestone remains in the town cemetery.

Several large plantations were located in this county in the colonial and antebellum periods, including Green Hill, Ayr Mount, Moorefields, The Elms, Sans Souci, Riverland, Alexander Hogan Plantation, and the Patterson Plantation.

==== University of North Carolina ====
Chartered by the North Carolina General Assembly on December 11, 1789, the University of North Carolina's cornerstone was laid on October 12, 1793, near the ruins of a chapel, chosen for its central location within the state. Beginning instruction of undergraduates in 1795, UNC is the oldest public university in the United States and the only one to award degrees in the 18th century.

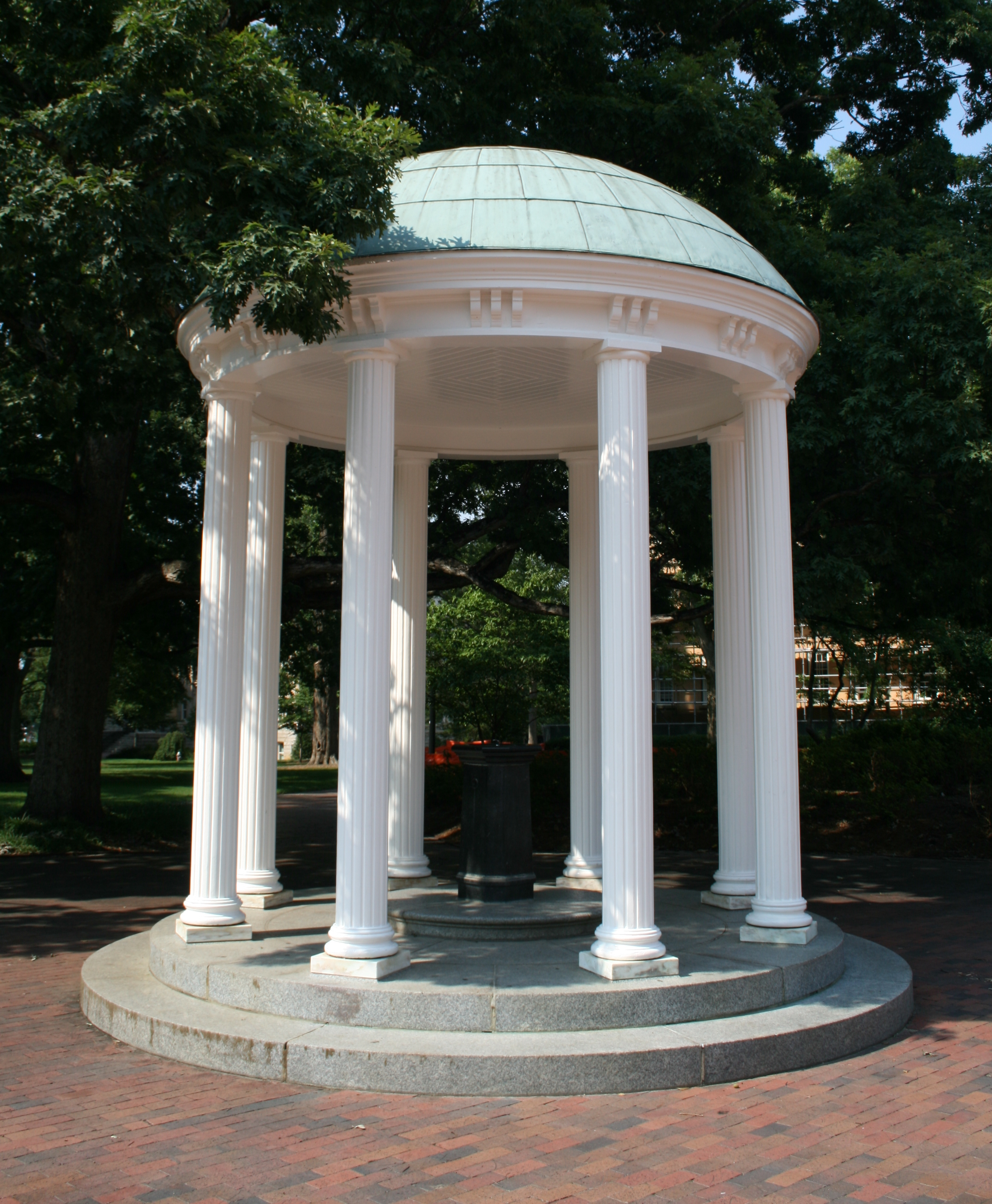
The Old Well, UNC's most recognized landmark

=== 19th century ===
The Reverend Robert and Margaret Anna Burwell founded and ran a school for girls called the Burwell School from 1837 to 1857 in their home on Churton Street in Hillsborough. Families of planters paid to have their daughters educated here.

When the Civil War began, Hillsborough was reluctant to support secession. However, many citizens went off to fight for the Confederacy. During the war, North Carolina Governor David Lowry Swain persuaded Confederate President Jefferson Davis to exempt some UNC students from the draft, so the university was among the few in the Confederacy that managed to stay open. But, Chapel Hill lost more population during the war than any other village in the South. When student numbers did not recover rapidly enough, the university closed for a period during Reconstruction, from December 1, 1870, to September 6, 1875.

In March 1865, Confederate General Joseph E. Johnston wintered just outside Hillsborough at the Dickson home. This house now serves as the Hillsborough Welcome Center in downtown (the house was moved from its original site in the early 1980s due to commercial development). The main portion of the Confederate Army of Tennessee was encamped between Hillsborough and Greensboro.

While camped in Raleigh after his March to the Sea, Union General William T. Sherman offered an armistice to Johnston, who agreed to meet to discuss terms of surrender. Johnston, traveling east from Hillsborough, and Sherman, traveling west from Raleigh along the Hillsborough-Raleigh Road, met roughly half-way near present-day Durham (then Durham Station) at the home of James and Nancy Bennett. Their farmhouse is now known as the Bennett Place. The two generals met on April 17, 18 and 26, 1865, negotiating terms of Johnston's surrender. Johnston surrendered 89,270 Southern troops who were active in North Carolina, South Carolina, Georgia, and Florida. This was the largest surrender of troops during the war, and effectively ended the Civil War.

=== 20th century ===
Occoneechee Speedway, just outside Hillsborough, was one of the first two NASCAR tracks to open, and is the only track remaining from that inaugural 1949 season. Bill France and the early founders of NASCAR bought land to build a one-mile oval track at Hillsborough, but opposition from local religious leaders prevented the track from being built in the town and NASCAR officials built the large speedway Talladega Superspeedway in Talladega, Alabama.

Chapel Hill, along with Durham and Raleigh, makes up one of the three corners of the Research Triangle, so named in 1959 with the creation of Research Triangle Park, a research park between Durham and Raleigh.

The Morehead Planetarium at UNC opened in 1949, when it was one of only a handful of planetariums in the nation. It continues as an important town landmark and destination for Chapel Hill. During the United States' Mercury, Gemini, and Apollo programs, astronauts were trained there.

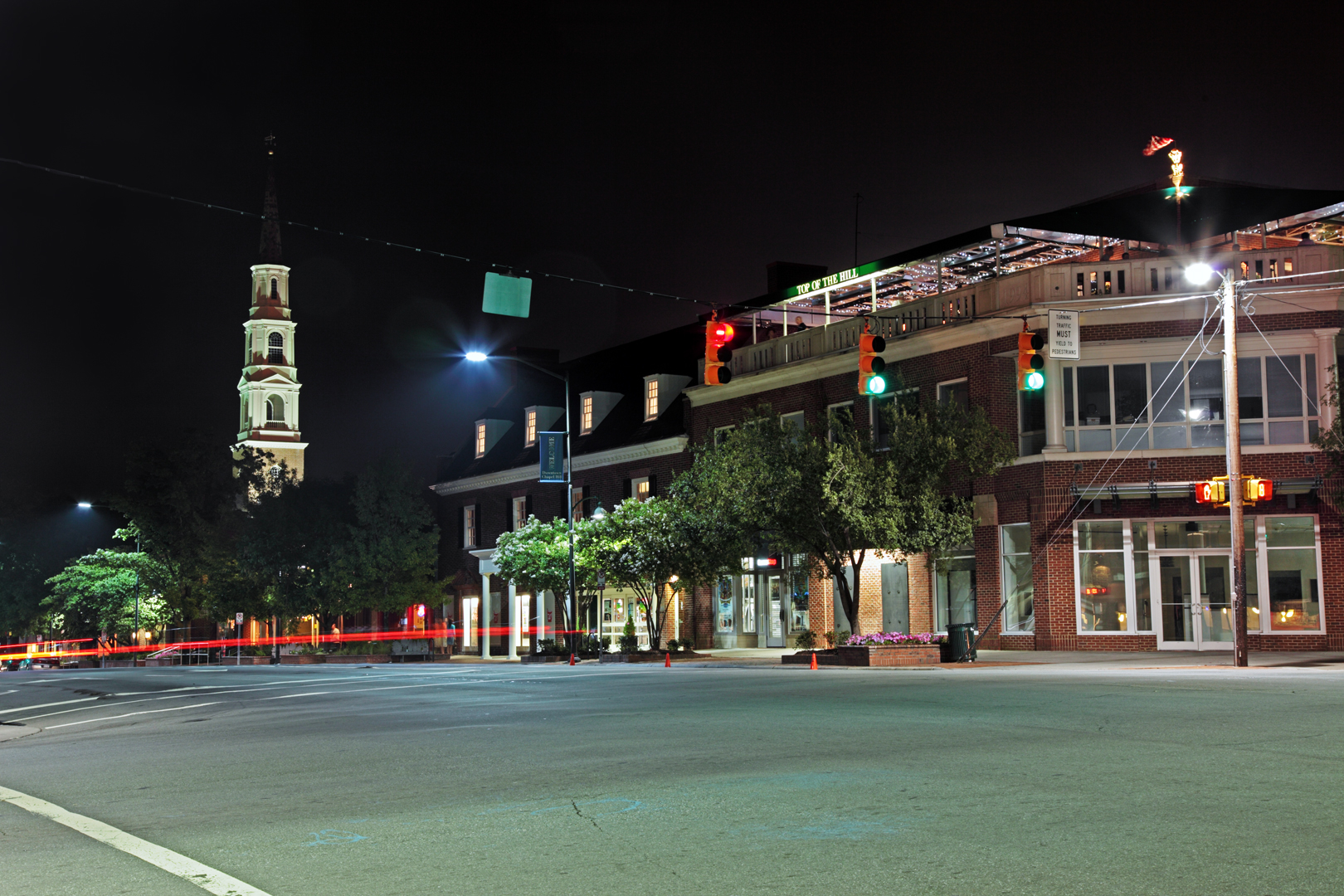
The intersection of Franklin Street and Columbia Street in Chapel Hill

During the 1960s, the UNC campus was the location of significant political protest. Prior to passage of the Civil Rights Act of 1964, protests about local racial segregation began quietly in Franklin Street restaurants; activists increased in influence and led mass demonstrations and civil disturbance.

Always suspicious of communist influence in the civil rights movement, the legislature passed the 1963 Speaker Ban Law, prohibiting speeches by communists on state campuses in North Carolina. University Chancellor William Brantley Aycock and University President William Friday criticized the law, but it was not reviewed by the North Carolina General Assembly until 1965. Small amendments to allow "infrequent" visits failed to placate the student body, especially when the university's board of trustees overruled new Chancellor Paul Frederick Sharp's decision to allow speaking invitations to Marxist speaker Herbert Aptheker and civil liberties activist Frank Wilkinson. The two speakers came to Chapel Hill anyway. Wilkinson spoke off campus, and more than 1,500 students watched Aptheker's speech across a low campus wall at the edge of campus, christened "Dan Moore's Wall" by The Daily Tar Heel, referring to Governor Dan K. Moore. A group of UNC students, along with Aptheker and Williamson, filed a lawsuit in U.S. federal court based on the right to free speech. On February 20, 1968, the Speaker Ban Law was ruled unconstitutional.

In 1968, a year after its public schools became fully integrated, Chapel Hill elected Howard Lee as mayor. This was the first predominantly white municipality in the country to elect an African-American mayor. Lee served from 1969 until 1975. Among other achievements, he helped establish Chapel Hill Transit, the town's bus system.

== Geography ==
Interactive map of Orange County

According to the United States Census Bureau, the county has a total area of 400.96 square miles (1,038.5 km^{2}), of which 397.56 square miles (1,029.7 km^{2}) is land and 3.40 square miles (8.8 km^{2}) (0.85%) is water.

The county is drained, in part, by the Eno River.

The city of Chapel Hill, is in the southeastern part of Orange County, as is Carrboro. Hillsborough is in the central part of the county and is the county seat.

=== State and local protected areas/sites ===
- Brumley Forest Nature Preserve
- Buckhorn Game Land
- Carolina North Forest
- Confluence Natural Area
- Eno River State Park (part)
- Historic Hillsborough
- Historic Occoneechee Speedway Trailhead
- Johnston Mill Nature Preserve
- Jordan Game Land (part)
- Lake Michael Park
- Little River Regional Park and Natural Area (part)
- Mason Farm Biological Reserve (part)
- North Carolina Botanical Garden
- Occoneechee Mountain State Natural Area
- White Cross Recreation Center

=== Major water bodies ===
- Buffalo Creek
- Cane Creek
- Cane Creek Reservoir
- Eastwood Lake
- Eno River
- Haw River
- Jordan Lake
- Lake Orange
- Lick Creek
- Little River
- Morgan Creek
- Mountain Creek
- New Hope Creek
- North Fork Little River
- University Lake
- West Fork Eno River

=== Adjacent counties ===
- Person County – northeast
- Durham County – east
- Chatham County – south
- Alamance County – west
- Caswell County – northwest

=== Major highways ===
- I-40
- I-85
- US 15
- US 70
- US 70 Bus.
- US 501
- NC 49
- NC 54
- NC 57
- NC 86
- NC 157
- NC 751

== Demographics ==
Historical population
Census	Pop.	Note	%±
1790	12,216		—
1800	16,362		33.9%
1810	20,135		23.1%
1820	23,492		16.7%
1830	23,908		1.8%
1840	24,356		1.9%
1850	17,055		−30.0%
1860	16,947		−0.6%
1870	17,507		3.3%
1880	23,698		35.4%
1890	14,948		−36.9%
1900	14,690		−1.7%
1910	15,064		2.5%
1920	17,895		18.8%
1930	21,171		18.3%
1940	23,072		9.0%
1950	34,435		49.3%
1960	42,970		24.8%
1970	57,707		34.3%
1980	77,055		33.5%
1990	93,851		21.8%
2000	118,227		26.0%
2010	133,801		13.2%
2020	148,696		11.1%
2025 (est.)	152,498	▲	2.6%
U.S. Decennial Census; 1790–1960 1900–1990; 1990–2000 2010 2020

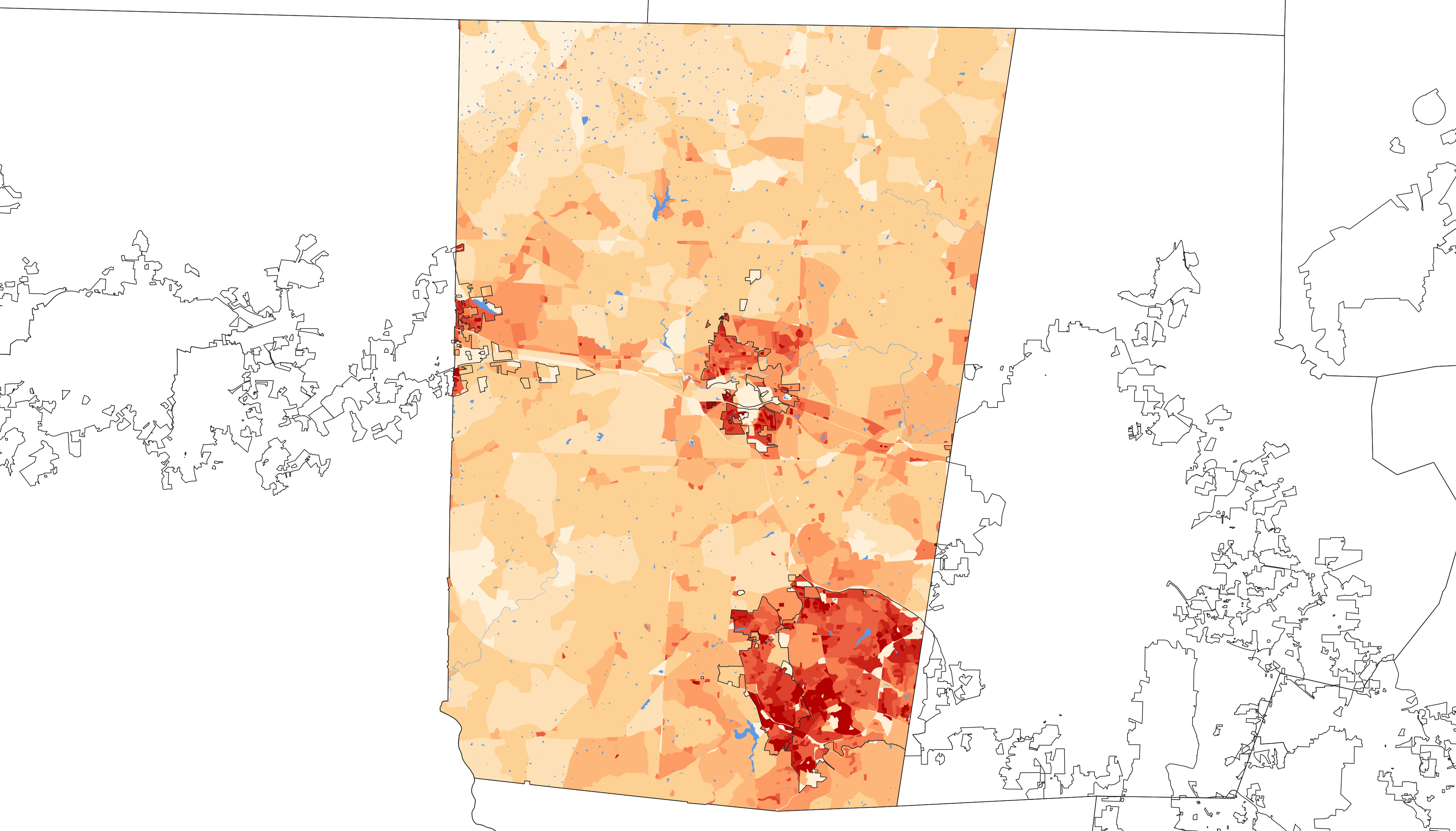
2020 population density of Orange County NC by census block

=== Racial and ethnic composition ===
Orange County, North Carolina – Racial and ethnic composition Note: the US Census treats Hispanic/Latino as an ethnic category. This table excludes Latinos from the racial categories and assigns them to a separate category. Hispanics/Latinos may be of any race.
Race / Ethnicity (NH = Non-Hispanic)	Pop 1980	Pop 1990	Pop 2000	Pop 2010	Pop 2020	% 1980	% 1990	% 2000	% 2010	% 2020
White alone (NH)	62,068	75,055	89,656	94,671	96,537	80.55%	79.97%	75.83%	70.76%	64.92%
Black or African American alone (NH)	13,194	14,847	16,175	15,722	15,571	17.12%	15.82%	13.68%	11.75%	10.47%
Native American or Alaska Native alone (NH)	163	273	388	383	334	0.21%	0.29%	0.33%	0.29%	0.22%
Asian alone (NH)	735	2,352	4,840	8,996	12,615	0.95%	2.51%	4.09%	6.72%	8.48%
Native Hawaiian or Pacific Islander alone (NH)	x	x	20	35	43	x	x	0.02%	0.03%	0.03%
Other race alone (NH)	212	45	169	316	798	0.28%	0.05%	0.14%	0.24%	0.54%
Mixed race or Multiracial (NH)	x	x	1,706	2,661	6,986	x	x	1.44%	1.99%	4.70%
Hispanic or Latino (any race)	683	1,279	5,273	11,017	15,812	0.89%	1.36%	4.46%	8.23%	10.63%
Total	77,055	93,851	118,227	133,801	148,696	100.00%	100.00%	100.00%	100.00%	100.00%

=== 2020 census ===
As of the 2020 census, the county had a population of 148,696. The 2020 census also counted 32,657 families residing in the county. The median age was 35.1 years; 19.6% of residents were under the age of 18 and 14.9% were 65 years of age or older. For every 100 females there were 90.8 males, and for every 100 females age 18 and over there were 88.0 males age 18 and over.

The racial makeup of the county was 66.6% White, 10.7% Black or African American, 0.6% American Indian and Alaska Native, 8.5% Asian, <0.1% Native Hawaiian and Pacific Islander, 5.4% from some other race, and 8.1% from two or more races. Hispanic or Latino residents of any race comprised 10.6% of the population.

71.0% of residents lived in urban areas, while 29.0% lived in rural areas.

There were 57,059 households in the county, of which 28.6% had children under the age of 18 living in them. Of all households, 45.9% were married-couple households, 18.7% were households with a male householder and no spouse or partner present, and 29.2% were households with a female householder and no spouse or partner present. About 28.9% of all households were made up of individuals and 9.9% had someone living alone who was 65 years of age or older.

There were 61,211 housing units, of which 6.8% were vacant. Among occupied housing units, 59.2% were owner-occupied and 40.8% were renter-occupied. The homeowner vacancy rate was 1.2% and the rental vacancy rate was 6.1%.

=== 2010 census ===
At the 2010 census, there were 133,801 people living in the county. 74.4% were White, 11.9% Black or African American, 6.7% Asian, 0.4% Native American, 4.0% of some other race and 2.5% of two or more races. 8.2% were Hispanic or Latino (of any race).

=== 2000 census ===
At the 2000 census, there were 118,227 people, 45,863 households, and 26,141 families living in the county. The population density was 296 people per square mile (114 people/km^{2}). There were 49,289 housing units at an average density of 123 units per square mile (47 units/km^{2}). The racial makeup of the county was 78.05% White, 13.79% Black or African American, 0.39% Native American, 4.10% Asian, 0.02% Pacific Islander, 1.96% from other races, and 1.71% from two or more races. 4.46% of the population were Hispanic or Latino of any race.

There were 45,863 households, out of which 28.30% had children under the age of 18 living with them, 44.60% were married couples living together, 9.40% had a female householder with no husband present, and 43.00% were non-families. 28.10% of all households were made up of individuals, and 6.10% had someone living alone who was 65 years of age or older. The average household size was 2.36 and the average family size was 2.95.

In the county, the age distribution was as follows: 20.30% under the age of 18, 21.00% from 18 to 24, 29.90% from 25 to 44, 20.40% from 45 to 64, and 8.40% who were 65 years of age or older. The median age was 30 years. For every 100 females there were 90.10 males. For every 100 females age 18 and over, there were 86.70 males.

The median income for a household in the county was $42,372, and the median income for a family was $59,874. Males had a median income of $39,298 versus $31,328 for females. The per capita income for the county was $24,873. About 6.20% of families and 14.10% of the population were below the poverty line, including 9.00% of those under age 18 and 7.40% of those age 65 or over. FY 2008-09 Orange County had the second highest property tax rate in NC at 0.998 per $100 of valuation. For FY 2009-10 after the 2009 Orange County revaluation, the rate is now ninth highest in the state at 0.858 per $100 of valuation.

== Law and government ==
Orange County is governed by a seven-member board of commissioners. The commissioners are elected to four-year terms by district and at-large in partisan elections, which are held in November of even-numbered years. Orange County is a member of the regional Central Pines Regional Council (formerly known as the Triangle J Council of Governments).

=== Politics ===
Orange County has gained a reputation as one of the most liberal counties in North Carolina. The county consistently delivers one of the largest Democratic majorities in the state in presidential, state, and local elections. This trend predates the recent swing toward the Democrats in counties dominated by college towns. The last Republican to win the county at a presidential level was Herbert Hoover in 1928 – when opposition to the Catholicism of Democratic nominee Al Smith was a powerful force among voters. It has only supported a Republican two other times since the Civil War–William Howard Taft in 1908 and William McKinley in 1900.

Democratic strength is concentrated in Hillsborough, Chapel Hill and Carrboro, while the rural areas of the county favor Republicans.

United States presidential election results for Orange County, North Carolina
Year	Republican		Democratic		Third party(ies)	
Year	No.	%	No.	%	No.	%
1880	1,902	42.85%	2,537	57.15%	0	0.00%
1884	1,064	38.83%	1,668	60.88%	8	0.29%
1888	1,299	44.08%	1,613	54.73%	35	1.19%
1892	936	33.07%	1,117	39.47%	777	27.46%
1896	1,264	42.44%	1,700	57.09%	14	0.47%
1900	1,280	49.90%	1,275	49.71%	10	0.39%
1904	558	37.63%	900	60.69%	25	1.69%
1908	1,073	51.29%	1,017	48.61%	2	0.10%
1912	172	8.63%	997	50.00%	825	41.37%
1916	1,158	48.49%	1,230	51.51%	0	0.00%
1920	1,737	46.57%	1,993	53.43%	0	0.00%
1924	1,065	35.38%	1,879	62.43%	66	2.19%
1928	2,564	58.77%	1,799	41.23%	0	0.00%
1932	1,114	26.50%	2,924	69.57%	165	3.93%
1936	1,446	27.25%	3,860	72.75%	0	0.00%
1940	1,100	23.05%	3,673	76.95%	0	0.00%
1944	1,467	30.94%	3,274	69.06%	0	0.00%
1948	1,813	31.03%	3,523	60.29%	507	8.68%
1952	3,813	42.51%	5,156	57.49%	0	0.00%
1956	4,396	48.10%	4,743	51.90%	0	0.00%
1960	5,231	42.15%	7,180	57.85%	0	0.00%
1964	5,785	38.59%	9,206	61.41%	0	0.00%
1968	6,097	33.30%	8,366	45.70%	3,845	21.00%
1972	11,632	47.66%	12,634	51.76%	142	0.58%
1976	9,302	36.87%	15,755	62.46%	169	0.67%
1980	9,261	32.39%	15,226	53.26%	4,102	14.35%
1984	15,585	42.96%	20,564	56.69%	128	0.35%
1988	14,503	39.13%	22,326	60.23%	238	0.64%
1992	13,009	27.50%	28,595	60.45%	5,696	12.04%
1996	15,053	32.19%	28,674	61.32%	3,038	6.50%
2000	17,930	36.34%	30,921	62.66%	493	1.00%
2004	20,771	32.38%	42,910	66.89%	472	0.74%
2008	20,266	27.05%	53,806	71.83%	838	1.12%
2012	21,539	28.06%	53,901	70.22%	1,317	1.72%
2016	18,557	22.54%	59,923	72.78%	3,860	4.69%
2020	20,176	23.74%	63,594	74.82%	1,227	1.44%
2024	20,806	23.70%	65,444	74.53%	1,557	1.77%

Chapel Hill and Carrboro have a reputation for being two of the most liberal communities in the Southern United States. Carrboro was the first municipality in North Carolina to elect an openly gay mayor, Mike Nelson (who also served as an Orange County commissioner from 2006 to 2010), and the first municipality in the state to grant domestic-partner benefits to same-sex couples. In October 2002, Carrboro was among the first municipalities in the South to pass resolutions opposing the Iraq War and the USA PATRIOT Act. Orange County voted 78.98% against Amendment 1. This was the highest vote against a constitutional ban on same-sex marriage of any county in the United States, even higher than San Francisco in 2008.

== Education ==
It is home to the University of North Carolina at Chapel Hill, the flagship institution of the University of North Carolina System and the oldest state-supported university in the United States.

The county is served by 2 public school districts:

- Orange County Schools
- Chapel Hill-Carrboro

== Media ==
Orange County is located in the Raleigh-Durham media market for both television and radio. The flagship station for PBS North Carolina, WUNC-TV, is licensed to Chapel Hill.

There are several radio stations located in the county. Stations licensed to Chapel Hill WUNC, WXYC, WCHL, and WLLQ. WQOK and WCOM-LP are licensed to Carrboro.

UNC Chapel Hill's student-run newspaper, The Daily Tar Heel, offers extensive coverage of news in Orange County.

== Communities ==
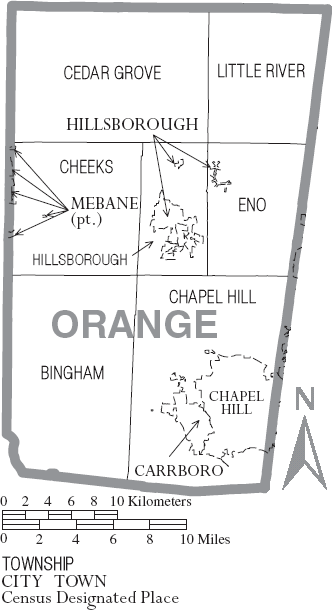
Map of Orange County with municipal and township labels

=== Cities ===
- Durham (mostly in Durham County)
- Mebane (mostly in Alamance County)

=== Towns ===
- Carrboro
- Chapel Hill (largest community; small portions in Durham County)
- Hillsborough (county seat)

=== Census-designated places ===
- Efland

=== Townships ===
- Bingham
- Cedar Grove
- Chapel Hill
- Cheeks
- Eno
- Hillsborough
- Little River

=== Unincorporated communities ===
- Blackwood
- Buckhorn (also known as Cheeks Crossroads)
- Caldwell
- Calvander
- Carr
- Cedar Grove
- Dodsons Crossroads
- Dogwood Acres
- Eno
- Eubanks
- Fairview
- Hurdle Mills
- Laws
- McDade
- Miles
- Oaks
- Orange Grove
- Piney Grove
- Schley
- Teer
- University
- White Cross

== Notable people ==
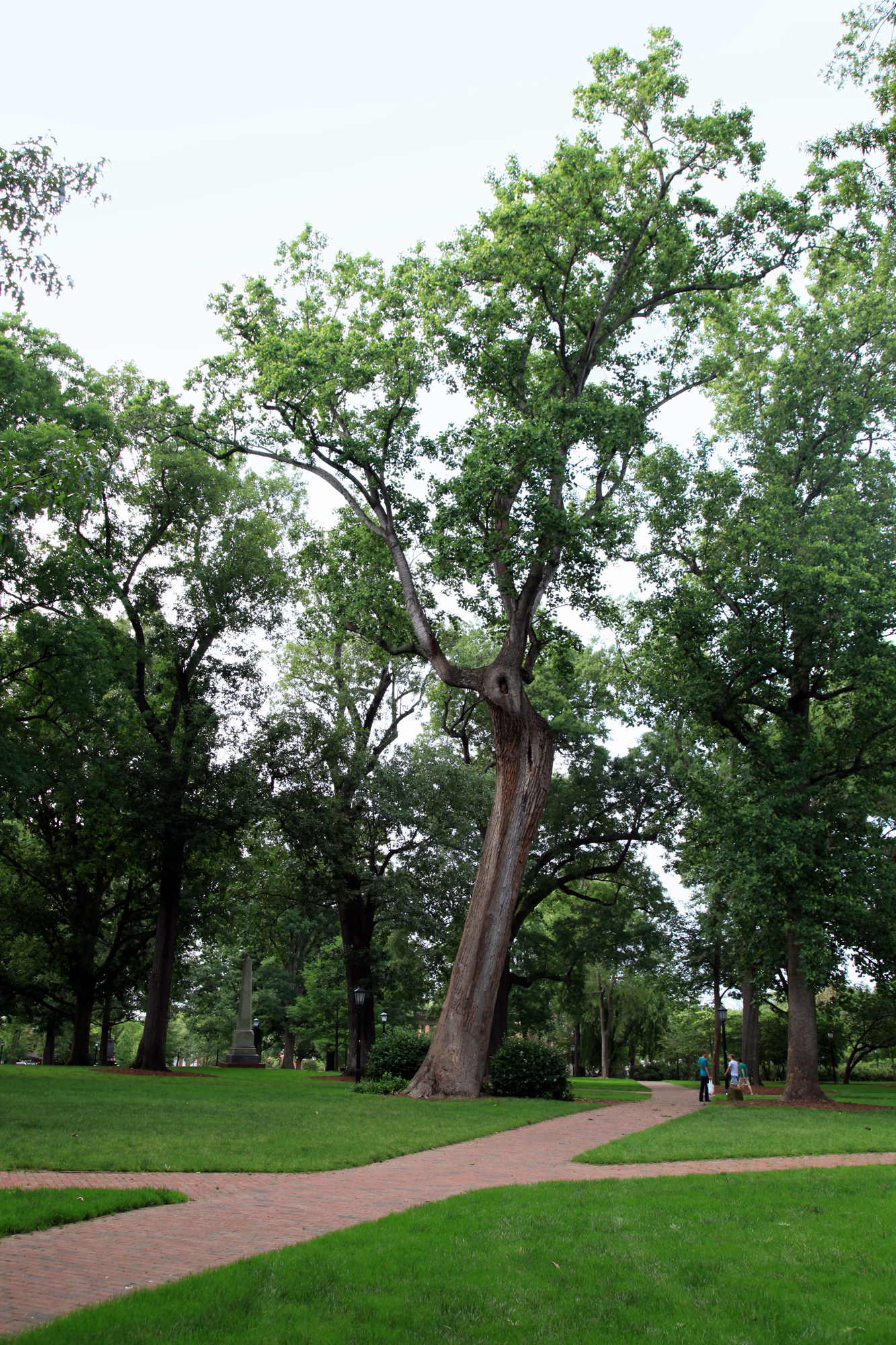
UNC's wooded campus buffers the town center of Chapel Hill

- Alice Adams, author, who grew up in Chapel Hill
- K.A. Applegate, author
- Thomas Samuel Ashe, United States Congressman from North Carolina
- Laura Ballance, musician and Merge Records co-founder
- Lewis Black, comedian
- David Brinkley, newscaster
- Fred Brooks, computer science pioneer
- Larry Brown, basketball coach
- Cam Cameron, football coach
- William Carter Love, U.S. Representative from North Carolina
- Spencer Chamberlain, musician
- Elizabeth Cotten, blues singer who grew up in Carrboro
- Floyd Council, blues singer, the "Floyd" in Pink Floyd
- Butch Davis, football coach
- Sarah Dessen, author
- Elizabeth Edwards, an attorney and activist for liberal causes, Chapel Hill
- John Edwards, former North Carolina Senator, 2008 Presidential candidate, Chapel Hill
- Sam Ervin, former North Carolina senator, chairman of the Senate Watergate Committee
- Lawrence Ferlinghetti, beat poet, co-founder of City Lights Booksellers
- Ben Folds, musician
- Paul Green, playwright
- Andy Griffith, actor
- Mia Hamm, soccer player
- Harpe Brothers, Micajah and Wiley, America's first serial killers
- Bunny Hearn, major league baseball pitcher
- Jack Hogan, actor, noted for his role as Private William Kirby on Combat! television series, 1962–1967
- Laurel Holloman, actress
- Herman Husband, a leader of the North Carolina Regulator Movement
- Marion Jones, former track and field athlete
- Michael Jordan, basketball player
- Elizabeth Keckley, former slave and servant of Mary Todd Lincoln
- Charles Kuralt, longtime journalist with CBS
- Jim Lampley, sportscaster
- Howard Lee, pioneering politician
- Doug Marlette, cartoonist and writer
- Mac McCaughan, musician and Merge Records co-founder
- Alexander Mebane Jr. (1744–1795), Revolutionary War militia general and U. S. Congressman
- Benjamin Merrill, leader in the Regulator movement and at the Battle of Alamance
- Elisha Mitchell, geologist
- Archibald Murphey, North Carolina politician
- Beverly Perdue, 73rd Governor of North Carolina
- Nick Perumov, author
- Mary Pope Osborne, author
- Frank Porter Graham, United States senator and president of the University of North Carolina at Chapel Hill
- David Price, U.S. congressman
- Connie Ray, actress and playwright
- David Rees, satirist
- Dexter Romweber, rockabilly roots-rocker
- Terry Sanford, United States senator and governor of North Carolina
- Stuart Scott, sportscaster
- Betty Smith, author
- Dean Smith, former basketball coach
- Lee Smith, author, lives in Hillsborough
- Oliver Smithies, 2007 recipient of the Nobel Prize
- Silda Wall Spitzer, wife of former New York governor Eliot Spitzer
- Chris Stamey, musician
- James Taylor, popular musician
- Lawrence Taylor, football player
- Manly Wade Wellman, novelist
- Daniel Wallace, author, lives in Carrboro
- Kent Williams, painter, illustrator and comics artist
- Roy Williams, basketball coach
- Thomas Wolfe, novelist
- James Worthy, basketball player

== See also ==
- List of counties in North Carolina
- National Register of Historic Places listings in Orange County, North Carolina
- Haw River Valley AVA, wine region partially located in the county
- Occaneechi Band of the Saponi Nation, state-recognized tribe that resides in the county
