= Margaret Nygard =

British educator and conservationist

- Nygard on the Eno River in 1982
- Born: Margaret Jacqueline Cruden Rodger; 25 January 1925; Nasik, Bombay Presidency, British Raj
- Died: 5 November 1995 (aged 70); Durham, North Carolina, U.S.
- Other names: Margaret Cruden Rodger Nygard, Margaret C. Nygard
- Occupations: Environmentalist, conservationist
- Years active: 1963–1995
- Known for: Eno River conservation project

Margaret Nygard (25 January 1925 – 5 November 1995) was a British-American environmentalist and conservationist. Born in British India to a civil servant, she was educated in both India and Britain. During the 1940 and 1941 bombing campaign against Britain, her school was relocated to British Columbia, Canada. Nygard studied English at the University of British Columbia and after her graduation in 1944 briefly became a teacher at the university. She went on to earn a master's degree and a PhD from the University of California, Berkeley. In 1962, she and her family moved to Durham, North Carolina, and became aware of environmental threats to the Eno River. She founded the Eno River Association in 1965, becoming its first president. She naturalised as a United States citizen in 1993.

Spearheading the group, Nygard and the association pressed for the creation of the Eno River State Park, the City of Durham's West Point on the Eno, and the federally-owned Penny's Bend Nature Preserve, as well as a green belt linking local, state, and federal lands along the Eno River. Taking actions to increase awareness of conservation and stop developers, they defeated plans to build a dam and reservoir, to construct high rise dwellings and housing tracts, and to locate a sewerage system, a major highway, and a landfill along the river. On their own initiative, the Eno River Association, established ties with The Nature Conservancy, creating its the first conservancy project in the state. During her work to prevent development on the Eno River, Nygard discovered the negatives of the photographer Hugh Mangum in a barn and worked with his family to donate his work for preservation to Duke University.

Nygard was the first recipient of both the Bartlett L. Durham Award of the Durham Historic Preservation Society and the Alexander Calder Conservation Award of The Conservation Fund for her work in preserving the wetlands and wildlife along the Eno. The Eno River Association which she founded and led until her death has continued its work on the river, adding three additional parks and nature preserves to the green belt since her death. The model Nygard developed has been replicated by other organizations in their attempts to preserve river habitats. She was posthumously awarded one of North Carolina's highest civilian honors, the Order of the Long Leaf Pine.

== Early life and education ==
Margaret Jacqueline Cruden Rodger was born on 25 January 1925 in Nasik, Bombay Presidency, in British India to Eileen (née Owen) and Robert C. Rodger. Her father's family was originally from Ayr, Scotland, and he served during World War I in the Gallipoli campaign. After the war, he was posted in India where he served as a colonial police official. Rodger began her schooling in Goudhurst, Kent, and then attended private grammar school in India. After returning to England, she began her secondary schooling at Princess Helena College in Hitchin, Hertfordshire. During The Blitz, the German bombing campaign launched from 1940 through 1941 against the United Kingdom, bombs were often dropped near the school and a decision was made to relocate the students to Ottawa, Ontario, in 1941.

In Canada, Rodger attended Ottawa Ladies' College for a year and then spent another year at Victoria College in Toronto. Continuing her studies, she enrolled at University of British Columbia, where she met Holger Olof Victorson Nygard, a fellow student, who was from Bertby, in the Vörå municipality, of Ostrobothnia, Finland. They both graduated in May 1944 with first class honours in English language and literature. Six months later, they obtained permission from Chief Justice of British Columbia Wendell B. Farris to marry, over the objections of Rodger's parents. They had opposed the marriage because she was only nineteen and because they had never met Holger, as they were still in India.

== Career ==
=== Early career (1944–1963) ===
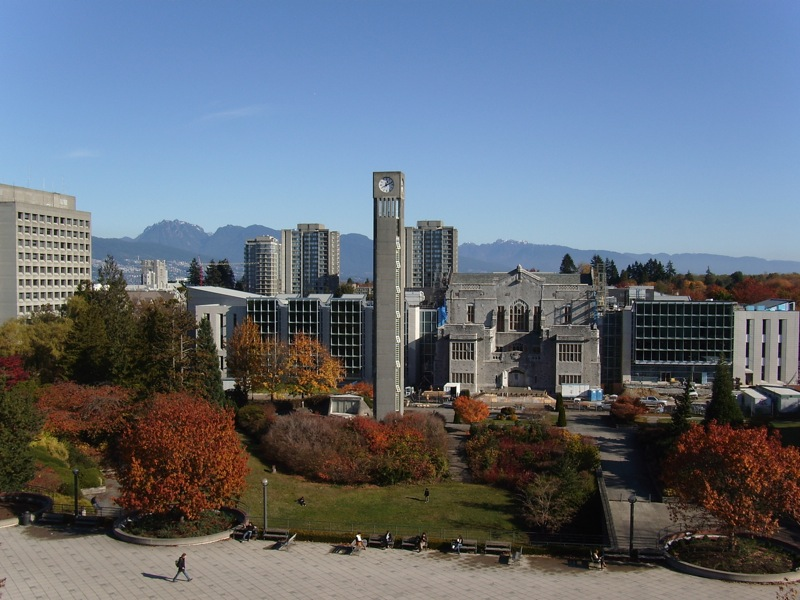
University of British Columbia

After their marriage, the couple both became professors, teaching at the University of British Columbia for three years. In 1948, Nygard received a Regent's Fellowship to study at the University of California, Berkeley, and Holger was hired as a teaching assistant in the English Department. She earned her master's degree in 1949 and began work on her Ph.D. She was awarded a scholarship by the Canadian Federation of University Women in 1951 to study abroad in England, focusing on the works of James Anthony Froude. The couple returned to the United States in 1953, when Holger was offered an assistant professorship at the University of Kansas in Lawrence to teach English and folklore courses.

After four years in Kansas, the couple moved to Knoxville, Tennessee in 1957, where Holger taught as an assistant professor of English. During the years they were moving about the United States, the Nygards had four children — Jennifer, Stephen, Kerstin, and Erik — and Nygard completed her PhD from Berkeley, with her work on Froude in 1960. In 1962, Holger became a full professor at Duke University and the following year, the family settled on the Eno River. Nygard worked at Durham Technical Community College as an English teacher briefly. The couple were active in protests against the Vietnam War. A chemical spill from a traffic accident shortly after they moved killed a large number of fish in the river. Concerned for the environment, their activism shifted focus.

=== Environmental activism (1963–1995) ===
In 1963, Nygard established a group of people to research the history of the surrounding river valley and in 1965, the Eno River Association was formed to address threats to the river. The association was operated out of Nygard's kitchen for over twenty years and she served as president for its first decade. One of the first threats was when the City of Durham accepted a plan in 1965 created by the Research Triangle's regional planning commission to dam the Eno River. Initial plans were to create a large recreational lake and to thwart a proposed housing development. In 1966, the city began to purchase land along the river for the projected dam and reservoir. At the same time, the city was making plans to attract industry on the promises of the reservoir. Nygard and other activists from the Eno River Association attended the 16 August 1966 Durham City Council meeting to protest the development.

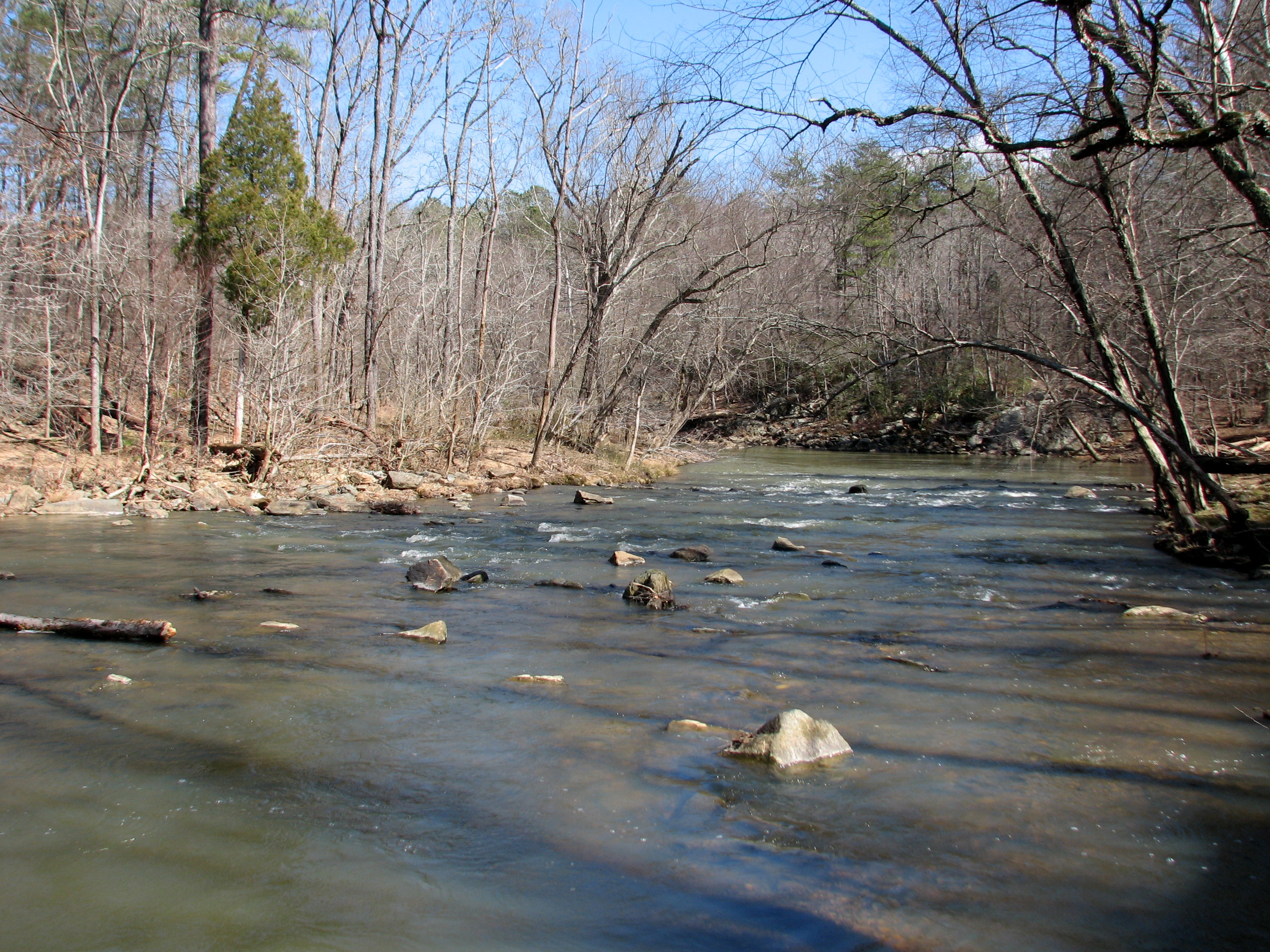
Eno River State Park

Early efforts of the activists were not welcomed, and they were accused of trying to block modern progress by local media and business people. Collecting scientific data on the destruction of flora and fauna, she led the effort to convince media and politicians of the need to protect the Eno. After winning the backing of Pearson Stewart, head of the regional planning commission, in 1968 the proposed dam site was relocated to the Flat River. Nygard promoted a plan by the Eno River Association to purchase land along the river. Association members scoured the real estate section of local newspapers looking for plots to purchase and through a grassroots effort visited civic clubs and published articles to raise awareness for protecting the area.

In 1970, the Nygards appeared before the state Board of Conservation and Development, arguing in favour of a 10,000 acre protected stretch along the Eno – 8,000 acres near Hillsborough and 2,000 acres in the area surrounding Durham and through Orange County. They stressed that a 20-mile-long green belt would preserve hiking and fishing areas and protect habitat areas. Leading spring and winter hikes along the banks, scheduling seasonal rafting trips, selling an annual calendar, and holding photograph competitions, the organization built local support for preservation and the establishment of the Eno River State Park.

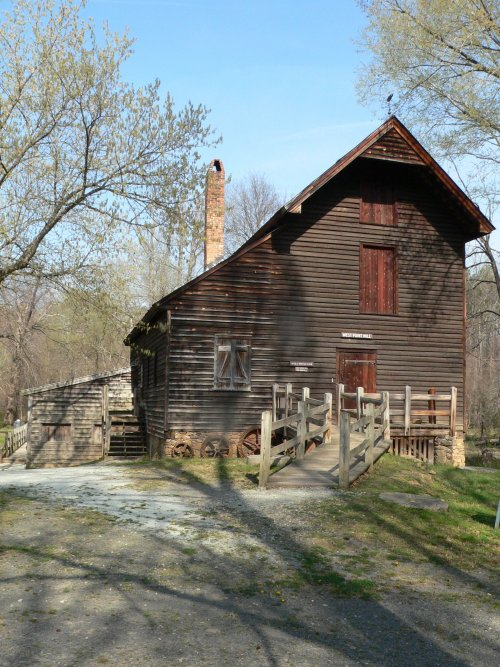
West Point Mill at West Point on the Eno Park

Securing the help of The Nature Conservancy on its own initiative, the Eno River Association developed an alternative plan to store water at the Nello Teer quarry, rather than in a reservoir and to develop a state park. The Nature Conservancy agreed to acquire land and hold it in trust in order to allow authorities to raise funds for securing the properties. It helped the association acquire charity status, enabling funds or land donations to be tax exempt. Members who had purchased land were then able to donate it to the conservancy and prevent it being condemned for development. The group's resourcefulness in establishing The Nature Conservancy's first project in the estate was recognized when the plan was accepted by the city in 1973. That year, the conservancy transferred the land it held in trust to the state.

During the fight for establishment of a park, in 1969 Nygard and the association became aware of a threat to a farmhouse, gristmill, and miller's house that were scheduled for demolition to be replaced with housing and mall development. The buildings were located at the junction of the Eno and Roxboro Road. To stop the bulldozers, which were on site, Nygard filed a request for an environmental impact statement. Rather than face lengthy delays, the developer reached a private settlement to sell the site to the City of Durham in 1972. Having acquired the properties, West Point on the Eno was developed as a park and the McCown-Mangum House, one of the buildings on the site was restored in 1976 by the Durham's Junior League.

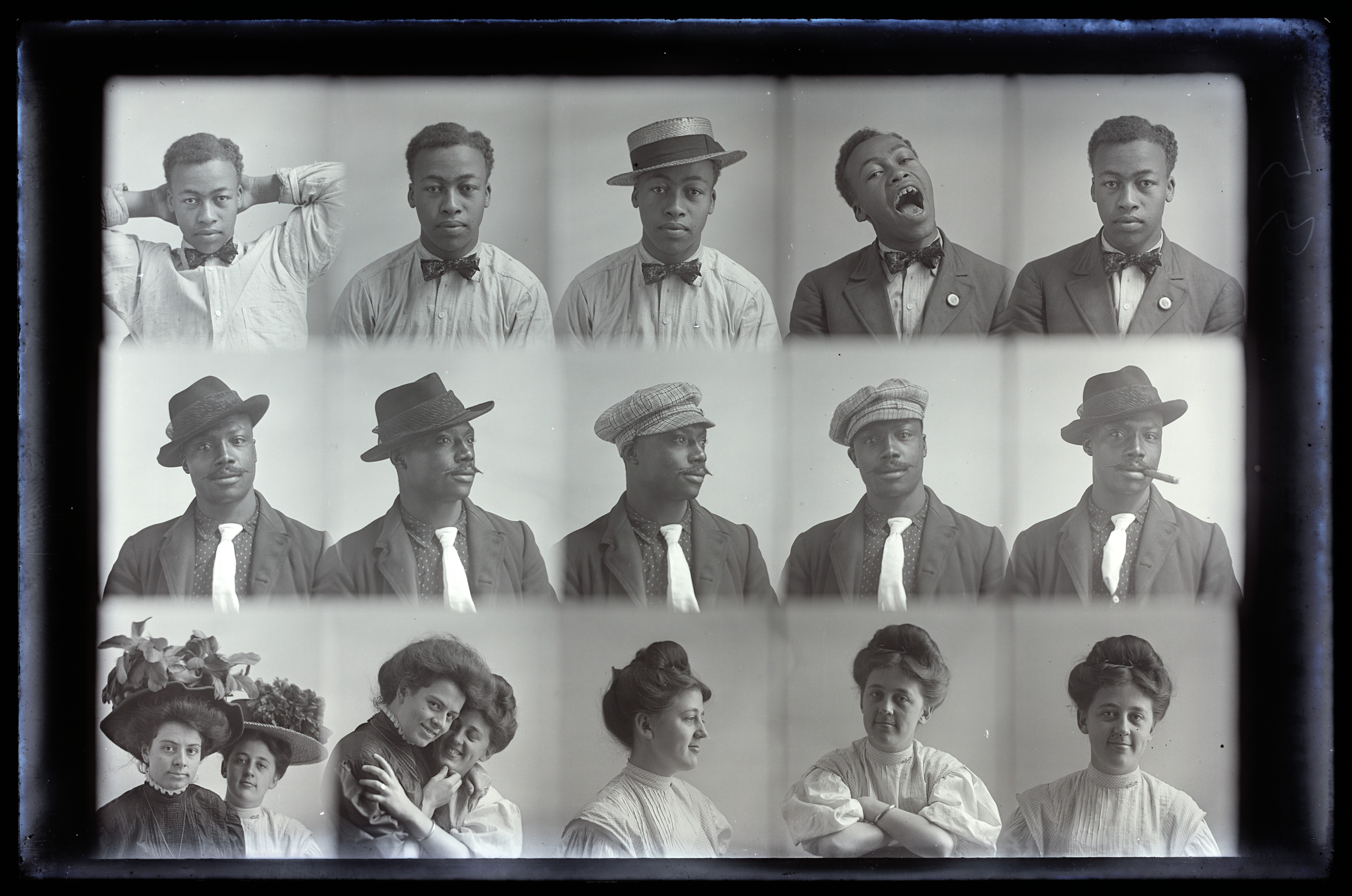
Sample of Mangum's glass plate negatives retrieved by Nygard, Johnson and Page

Over the seven-year span of negotiations to resolve the status of the properties, glass plate negatives by photographer Hugh Mangum were discovered in a barn on the site of the McCown-Mangum House. Many of them were removed by neighbours, children damaged some of them during play, and Mangum's daughter Julia Rowe destroyed his nude photographic plates. Upon acquisition of the property by the City of Durham, Nygard, William Perry Johnson, a local genealogist, and David Page, a local photographer, collected and cleaned the remaining negatives and returned them to Mangum's nephew, Jack Vaughan. The family decided to entrust the care of the negatives to the Eno River Association.

Despite these accomplishments, threats to the waterway and establishing the park persisted. Among those issues were proposed sewer crossings, highway construction, and business development including high-rise structures. In 1970, a shopping mall was proposed, as well as a 163-unit development of tract housing. The following year, a proposed sewer line could have crossed the river 24 times. When that idea found opposition, the plan was to lay the lines along the river banks. For several months, Nygard and other association members took the planning commissioners to walk and canoe along the river to make them aware of the damage the plans would do to the area. The association also battled over a 1973 proposal to locate a 155-acre landfill on the Eno and the construction of a major highway. All of these plans were modified or completely discarded thanks to the advocacy of the Eno River Association.

Controversy emerged between homeowners over how property would be acquired. Concerned that private property would be condemned by the state if an owner refused to sell land for the proposed state park, Stewart Barbour of Hillsborough created an organization in 1975, known as the Eno River Group. His supporters advocated preserving the area along the Eno but through privately owned farms and woodlands and opposed creation of a state park. Nygard's response was that preservation of the area would require cooperation between property owners, as well as city, state, and federal authorities. The state park officially opened in 1975, but controversy over the acquisition of land from local homeowners continued through the 1980s. After the park opening, Nygard stepped down as president of the Eno River Association, serving as the executive vice-president until her death. She was known for her dedication to the river and for her gentle but steely resolve to protect it.

In 1976, Durham County Commissioners granted permission for the United States Army Corps of Engineers to begin the Falls River Reservoir and Dam Project. When the Corps of Engineers began buying land for the reservoir over the next few years, they acquired the former property of Paul C. Cameron, known as Penny's Bend. Because it met preservation requirements, the Penny's Bend Nature Preserve was established and leased to the state of North Carolina. The Eno River Association was one of those appointed by the Management Advisory Committee to manage the habitat. Among their activities were clean-up days held at Penny's Ridge. In 1980, an annual Festival for the Eno was established to raise funds for continuing land purchases along the river. Difficulties continued into the 1980s with Nygard and the association opposing plans to establish a pumping station on the lower Eno to resupply the Cape Fear watershed which supports Chapel Hill. Ongoing efforts to educate officials and the public about the interdependence of waterways and the cause and effect of development continued. With the assistance of Page, in 1986, the Eno River Association donated Mangum's negatives to Duke University for conservation and their preservation.

== Awards and honours ==
West Point on the Eno applied to be listed on the National Register of Historic Places in 1983 and was approved in 1985. That year, Nygard was honored by the Durham Historic Preservation Society with the inaugural Bartlett L. Durham Award. In 1988, she was presented with the first Alexander Calder Conservation Award from The Conservation Fund, an environmental NGO based in Alexandria, Virginia. The award recognised her work in preserving the wetlands and wildlife along the Eno, protecting close to five thousand acres of land as natural habitat and for recreational purposes. That same year, the Eno River Association was granted the Take Pride in America award from the United States Department of the Interior. Nygard naturalised as a United States citizen in 1993. In 1995, she was posthumously awarded the Order of the Long Leaf Pine, one of North Carolina's highest civilian honours.

== Death and legacy ==
Nygard became ill at her home in Durham after having stayed up all night preparing for a meeting of the Eno River Association. She was transported to Duke University Hospital, where she died on 5 November 1995 from heart failure. Her work resulted in 2,200 acres of riverbank and waterway being protected as the Eno River State Park, establishment of the West Point on the Eno and Penny's Ridge Preserve, as well as protection of the William B. Umstead State Park near Raleigh, and the Jockey's Ridge State Park, in Dare County. She was instrumental in pressing for the legislature to establish a trust fund to permanently endow and protect state parks and create a 40-mile greenbelt linking local and federal lands along the river. The three-day event, Festival for the Eno, which she started occurs on the Independence Day weekend each 4 July. The model Nygard developed with activists from the Eno River Association has been replicated by other organizations in their attempts to preserve river habitats. The Eno River Association continues to work in conservation. It has supported the establishment of the Occoneechee Mountain State Natural Area (1997), the Little River Regional Park (2001), and the Confluence Natural Area (2018).

Beginning in 2005, Nygard's papers were donated to the University of North Carolina at Chapel Hill and are held in the Wilson Special Collections Library. They include both her personal archive and records relating to the founding and operation of the Eno River Association. After Holger's death in 2015, the Nygard's children discovered two additional boxes, containing nearly 250 negatives, of Mangum's work in the family attic. The siblings contacted the David M. Rubenstein Rare Book & Manuscript Library at Duke University to donate them to the existing collection. Two years of conservation of the negatives were required before they were available for public access.
