= Eno River Festival =

Music and culture festival in Durham, North Carolina

- Frequency: Annual
- Locations: West Point on the Eno, Durham, North Carolina, US
- Established: 1980
- Founder: Margaret Nygard
- Organizer: Eno River Association
- Website: enofest.org

The Eno River Festival, also called the Festival for the Eno River, is a music and culture festival held in Durham, North Carolina in the United States on and around the Fourth of July each year since 1980. It is organized by the Eno River Association, a nonprofit that works to conserve and protect the Eno River's ecosystem, history, and culture. The festival is held at the West Point on the Eno park in Durham.

== History ==
The Eno River Association was founded in 1966 as an organization dedicated to preserving the Eno River and its surroundings. At the time, the river was listed as "threatened and impaired", and the city of Durham had proposed the creation of a reservoir that would have flooded the river valley. The Eno River Association formed to oppose the reservoir project, and proposed the creation of the Eno River State Park, approved in 1972 and opened in 1975.

The first Eno Festival was a one-day event held on July 4, 1980. It was preceded by the NC Folklife Festival at the same location in 1976.

In 2020, the festival was canceled due to the COVID-19 pandemic, and a virtual event was held in its place. The festival returned in 2021.

In 2026, the Eno River Association announced that the festival would not happen during July that year, due to extreme high temperatures and construction in the park that summer. A replacement benefit concert is scheduled for September 12, 2026.
