= Piper–Cox House =

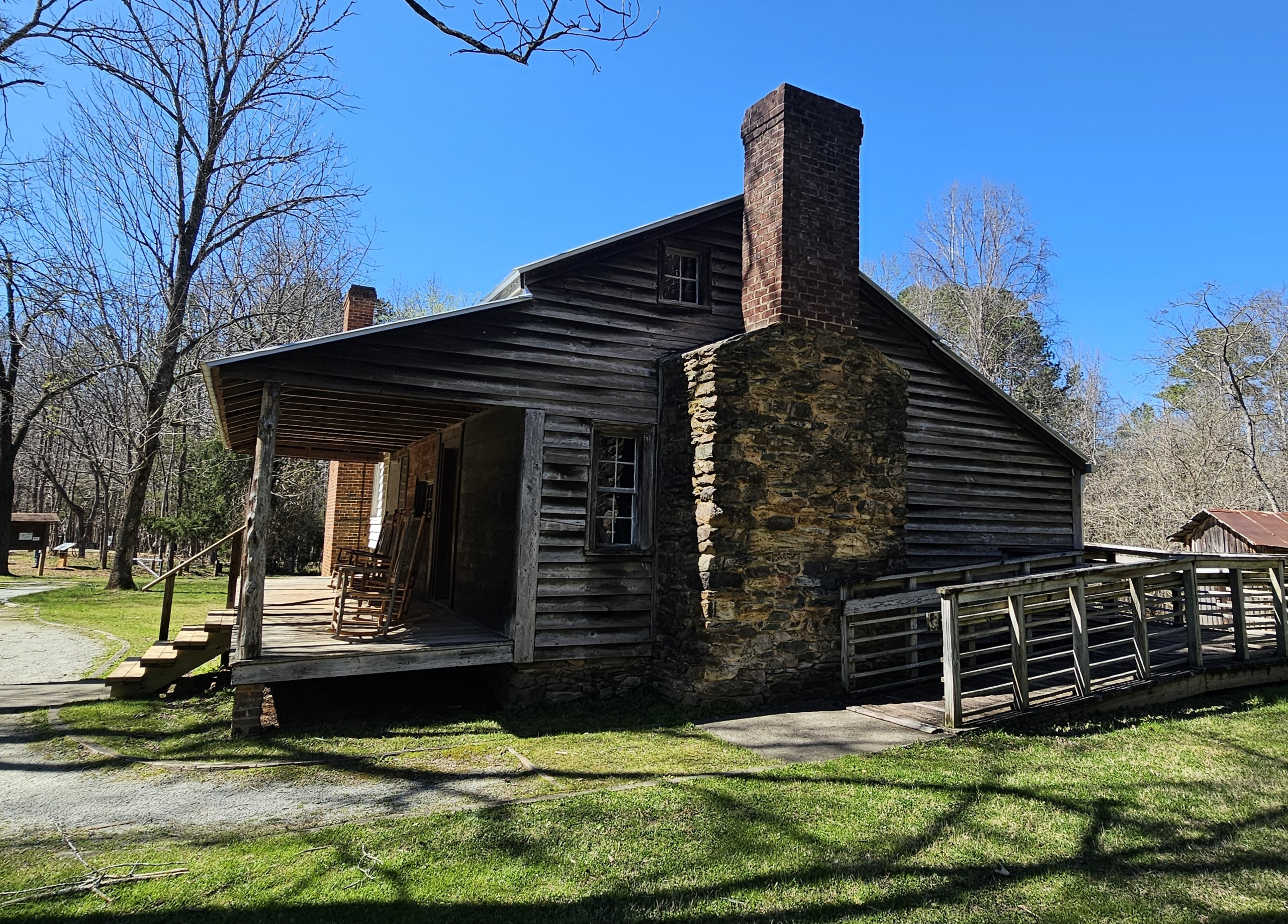
- The Piper–Cox House in Eno River State Park
- Interactive map of the Piper–Cox House area
- Alternative names: Riverside

General information
- Architectural style: Log construction with later frame addition (dogtrot form)
- Location: Eno River State Park, Durham County, North Carolina, United States
- Coordinates: 36.078109°N 79.006422°W
- Year built: c. 1765–1870s
- Governing body: North Carolina Division of Parks and Recreation

The Piper–Cox House (also known as Riverside) is a historic farmhouse located in Eno River State Park in Durham County, North Carolina. The structure consists of an early log cabin built by the Piper family in the late 18th or early 19th century, and a larger frame house added in the 1870s by the Cox family. The house is preserved as a historic site illustrating rural life and architectural development in the Eno River valley.

== History ==
=== Piper family and early settlement ===
The earliest portion of the house is a log cabin constructed between approximately 1765 and 1820 by members of the Piper family, early settlers along the Eno River. According to interpretive signage at the site, the log cabin was a two-story structure with three rooms, built using hand-hewn timbers and traditional joinery techniques such as half-dovetail corner joints.

Members of the Piper family were also associated with the nearby Piper–Cabe School, which later served as a dwelling.

=== Cox family expansion ===
In 1872, Ellison Mangum sold the property, known as the "Thomas Piper Place," to Sanders P. Cox. In 1873, the property was transferred to Wiley Wooten Cox, who constructed a substantial frame addition to the original log cabin.

The addition was connected to the earlier structure by a breezeway, forming a dogtrot-style house typical of Southern rural architecture. The expanded house became one of the more prominent farm dwellings in the Eno River valley during the late 19th century.

During this period, the farm produced crops including wheat, corn, oats, and rye, and supported livestock operations typical of the region's agricultural economy.

=== 19th-century community context ===
The Piper–Cox property was part of a broader agricultural and milling landscape along the Eno River. Nearby mills, including Cox's Mill, supported local grain production and trade.

Historical records indicate that the Piper family owned substantial acreage along the river, and that property and possessions were distributed among heirs following the death of John Piper Jr. in 1835.

=== 20th century and decline ===
By the early 20th century, the house had passed out of family ownership and fell into disrepair. Photographs from the early 1900s show the structure in deteriorated condition prior to restoration efforts.

=== State acquisition and restoration ===
In 1980, the State of North Carolina acquired the Piper–Cox House and approximately 40 acres of surrounding land as part of the development of Eno River State Park.

Restoration efforts began in the late 20th century. The log cabin portion was restored in the 1980s, and a major restoration of the Cox addition was completed in the early 2000s, funded in part by the North Carolina Parks and Recreation Trust Fund.

The restoration sought to return the structure to its late 19th-century appearance, based on historical documentation and local recollections.

== Architecture ==
The Piper–Cox House is a composite structure reflecting multiple phases of construction:

- A rear log cabin (late 18th to early 19th century)
- A front frame house addition (1870s)
- A connecting dogtrot breezeway

The log cabin features hand-hewn timbers, square logs, and half-dovetail corner joints. It contains two stories and three rooms.

The Cox addition represents a later stage of rural architectural development, incorporating a larger and more formal layout. The combination of the two structures illustrates the evolution of domestic architecture in rural North Carolina.

== Modern use ==
The Piper–Cox House is preserved as part of Eno River State Park and serves as an interpretive historic site. It is accessible to visitors via park trails and is used for educational programming about early settlement, agriculture, and architecture in the Eno River region.

== See also ==
- Eno River State Park
- Durham County, North Carolina
