= Lake Michie =

Reservoir in North Carolina, U.S.

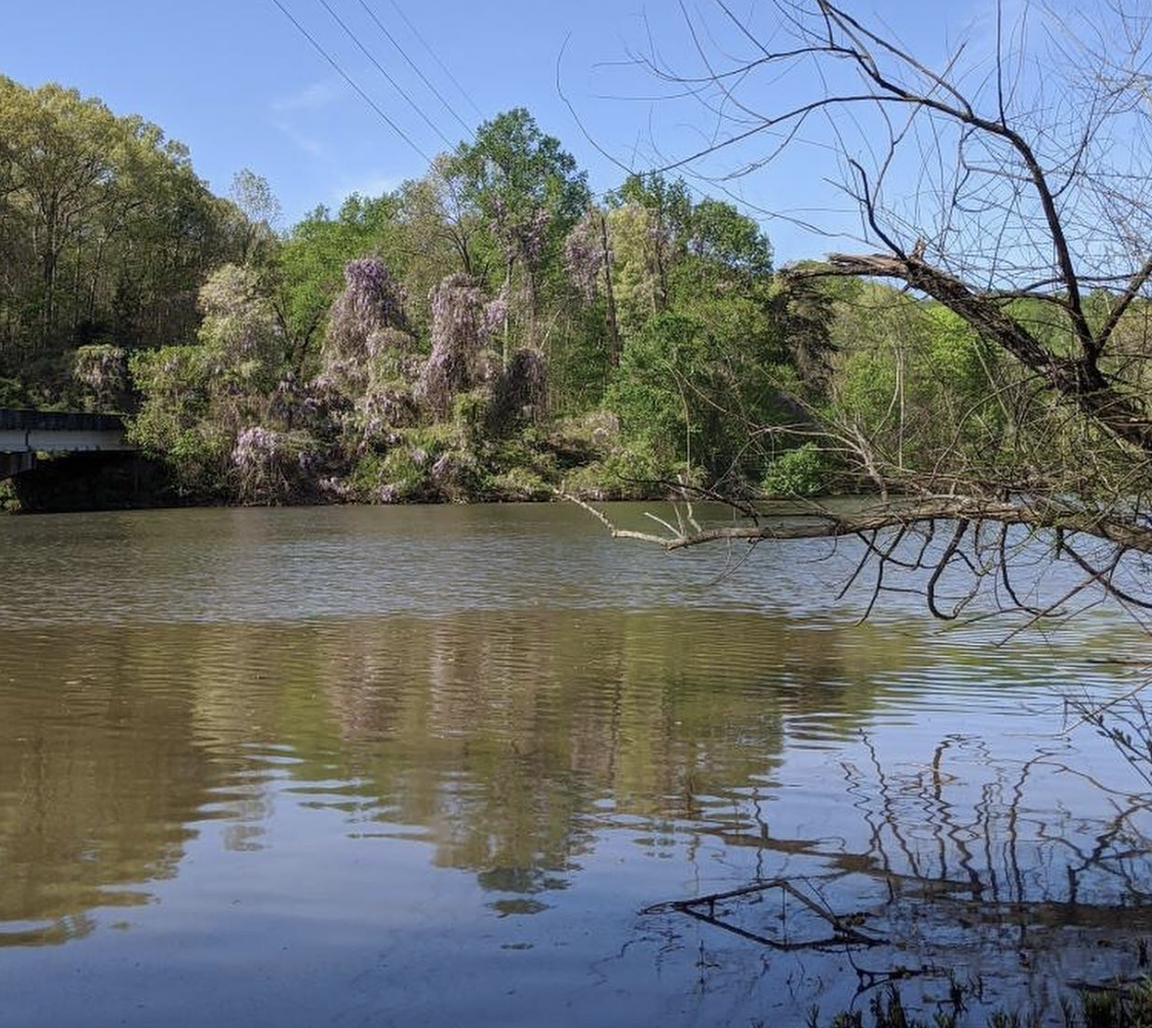
- Lake Michie in 2020

- Location within North Carolina Location within the United States
- Location: Durham County, North Carolina
- Coordinates: 36°09′40″N 78°50′30″W
- Type: reservoir
- Primary inflows: Flat River
- Primary outflows: Flat River
- Catchment area: 168 sq mi (440 km^{2})
- Basin countries: United States
- Surface area: 480 acres (1.9 km^{2})
- Surface elevation: 341 ft (104 m)
- Settlements: Durham

Lake Michie is a reservoir in central North Carolina, within the Neuse River watershed. The lake is located in northern Durham County near the town of Bahama. Fed principally by the Flat River, Lake Michie is the primary reservoir for the city of Durham. The reservoir dam was completed in 1926.

In addition to retaining drinking water for the city, the concrete and earthwork dam, built between 1924 and 1926, supplied hydroelectric power to Durham until 1960, when the generators were removed.

== Recreational area ==
Lake Michie has Largemouth Bass. Boat rentals are available. Other fish found in the lake include Bull Catfish, Mud Catfish, Channel Catfish, Flathead Catfish, Blue Catfish, Chain Pikerel, Longnose Gar, and various others.

== Expansion ==
In 2004 city officials were considering expanding the lake, which normally supplies Durham with 30–35 million US gallons (110,000–130,000 m^{3}) of drinking water per day to address future water needs and reverse the ongoing reduction in lake volume by sedimentary deposits.

== 2007 drought ==
During the drought of 2007, both Lake Michie and the Little River Reservoir, Durham's primary sources of drinking water, were severely affected, despite a reduction in daily water use from 37 million US gallons (140,000 m^{3}) per day to 22.16 million US gallons (83,900 m^{3}) per day. As of 2 December, the lake level had fallen to 15 ft (4.6 m) below full. By March 2008 Lake Michie was once again filled to overflowing, thanks to above average rainfall.
