= Little River (Eno River tributary) =

Stream in North Carolina, USA

Little River Tributary to Eno River
- Location of Little River mouth Little River (Eno River tributary) (the United States)

Location
- Country: United States
- State: North Carolina
- County: Durham

Physical characteristics
- Source: confluence of North and South Forks of Little River
  - location: about 3 miles north of Durham, North Carolina
  - coordinates: 36°09′05″N 078°56′30″W
  - elevation: 420 ft (130 m)
- Mouth: Eno River
  - location: Durham, North Carolina
  - coordinates: 36°04′19″N 078°50′39″W
  - elevation: 255 ft (78 m)
- Length: 12.83 mi (20.65 km)
- Basin size: 104.88 square miles (271.6 km^{2})
- Discharge
  - location: Durham, North Carolina
  - average: 107.74 cu ft/s (3.051 m^{3}/s) at mouth with Eno River

Basin features
- Progression: Eno River → Neuse River → Pamlico Sound → Atlantic Ocean
- River system: Neuse River
- Tributaries
  - left: North Fork Little River; Mountain Creek
  - right: South Fork Little River; Cabin Branch
- Waterbodies: Little River Reservoir

Little River is a 12.83 mi (20.65 km) long tributary to the Eno River in Durham County, North Carolina. Little River along with the Flat River are the major tributaries to the Eno River before it enters Falls Lake.

Both the North Fork of Little River and the South Fork begin in northern Orange County, North Carolina near Hurdle Mills Road. The South and North Forks come together in a confluence near Guess Road and South Lowell Road in northern Durham County. 5.5 miles southeast of the confluence, the Little River is dammed to form the Little River Reservoir, a drinking water source for the City of Durham. The damming of the river in 1983 flooded a significant portion of the historic community of Orange Factory.

In the 1970s and early 1980s, the Little River was a popular swimming hole and meeting place for Durham's gay residents. On April 13th, 1981, Chris Lee Richardson and Guy Charles Obsahr killed Ronald “Sonny” Kenneth Antonevitch, whom they suspected of being gay, by clubbing him to death while holding his head under water. Antonevitch's murder was a catalyst for the LGBTQ rights movement in North Carolina.

== See also ==
- Little River attacks
