= Carr Township =

Carr Township may refer to the following townships in the United States:

- Carr Township, Clark County, Indiana
- Carr Township, Jackson County, Indiana
- Carr Township, Durham County, North Carolina
