= Hugh Mangum =

American photographer

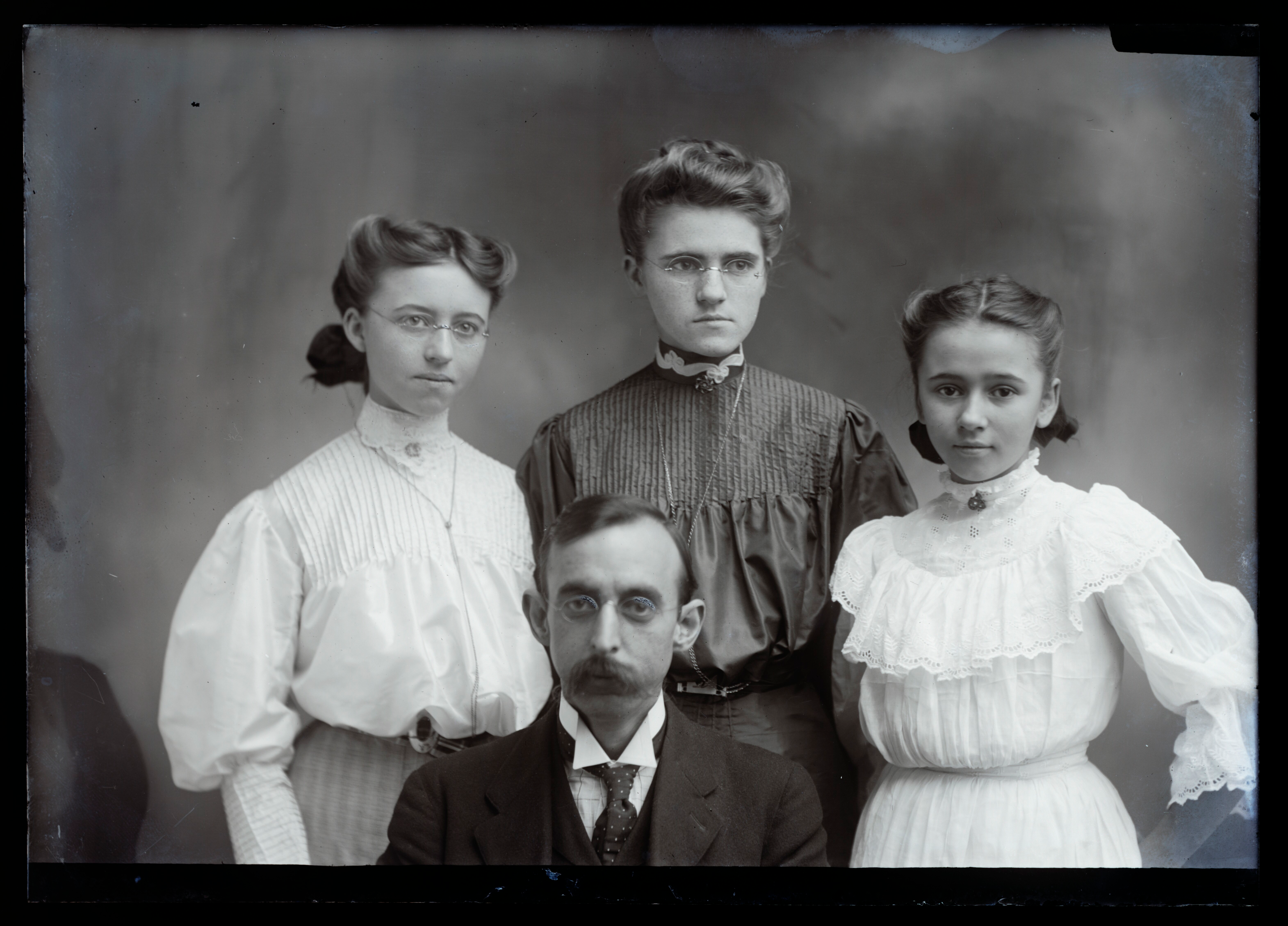
- Hugh Mangum with three girls, possibly his sisters
- Born: Hugh Leonard Mangum; June 3, 1877; Durham, North Carolina
- Died: March 12, 1922 (aged 44); Roanoke, Virginia
- Resting place: Central Cemetery, Radford, Virginia
- Known for: Photography

Hugh Mangum (June 3, 1877 - March 12, 1922) was an American photographer who worked in the American South from the 1890s through 1922 at the height of Jim Crow laws mandating racial segregation and discrimination. Like a few other photographers in the South at the time, Mangum seemed to have maintained an open door policy in his itinerant and studios, and welcomed black and white people. His glass plate negatives, found in a family barn slated for demolition, were brought to light almost fifty years after his death.

== Biography ==
Hugh Leonard Mangum was born June 3, 1877, on Main Street in Durham, North Carolina, son of Presley J. Mangum, a Durham postmaster, and Sally Mangum nee Farhting. In 1891, wishing to escape the bustle of a growing Durham, Mangum's father bought a house six miles North of the city, on a property of mills and tobacco barns, known as the McCown House at West Point on the Eno. The family used the house as a summer home for two years and moved to this more rural spot permanently in 1893. As told by his brother Leo, who outlived Hugh by more than four decades, Hugh was invited at the age of sixteen to attend Trinity College (later Duke University) but chose instead to study fine arts in Winston-Salem at Salem College, the oldest women’s educational institution in the United States. There is, however, no record confirming Mangum's studies at Salem College.

A box of Hugh Mangum's photographs with the date 1897 was found in 2016. Margaret Sartor and Alex Harris used this information to guess that Mangum began making professional portraits in 1897, though many of his images were made earlier. His traveling studio had a straight-forward approach: affordable pictures, quickly produced, and as far as is known –– no records kept of the persons portrayed by his camera. Using mostly simple backgrounds and natural light, the pictures sharply delineate hair, clothing and body language. Though he may have begun traveling earlier, Mangum was riding the rails by 1899, the year he began a handwritten log of the towns he visited. That log, begun on the inside of a suitcase, eventually migrated to the inside lid of a large traveling trunk, and provides us with some of the best clues we have about where he worked. The beginning of Mangum’s itinerant career also coincides with legalized segregation in North Carolina, beginning with the mandated separation of Black Americans and whites in railroad cars and passenger waiting rooms. As the oppression of Jim Crow worsened, Hugh Mangum continued to travel, photographing people of all colors and from all walks of life at prices that allowed even the most humble to afford his services.

Hugh Mangum visited eight to ten different towns a year, some more than once. He usually remained in a town for one to seven days and would visit several in a row before returning to Durham for a stay of several weeks to months. By matching the towns in his travel log to clues in his photographs, it’s clear that Mangum frequented towns with schools, especially women’s colleges and military academies. Some of his advertising flyers indicate specials to school children, and others. He set up his studio tent near railroad depots and circuses. He followed vaudeville shows, making portraits of performers as well as spectators. He stopped at roadsides, set up his tripod to photograph workers in fields and caravans of gypsies. He made photographs inside and outside of schools and churches, of congregations, and of classroom pupils, veteran groups, and family reunions. He visited people at their homes to make family portraits.

In 1906, after years of itinerant work, attempted partnerships and working under a few different studio names, at age twenty-nine, Mangum married Annie Carden of East Radford, Virginia. The couple soon set up residence in her hometown, near her family. After marrying, Hugh continued traveling but also operated seasonal studios in Durham, Radford, and its sister town of Pulaski. Then, after more than two decades of a nomadic professional life, Hugh Mangum’s Radford studio was destroyed by fire in 1919. Within a year, he took over the proprietorship of the well-established, and permanent, Kidd Studio in the nearby city of Roanoke.

== Personal life ==
Hugh Leonard Mangum was born June 3, 1877, on Main Street in Durham, son of Presley J. Mangum, a Durham postmaster, and Sally Mangum nee Farhting. As told by his brother Leo, who outlived Hugh by more than four decades, Hugh was invited at the age of sixteen to attend Trinity College (later Duke University) but chose instead to study fine arts in Winston-Salem at Salem College, the oldest women’s educational institution in the United States. There is, however, no record confirming Mangum's studies at Salem College. In 1906 at age twenty-nine, after years of itinerant work, attempted partnerships and working under a few different studio names, Mangum married Annie Carden of East Radford, Virginia. The couple soon set up residence in her hometown, near her family. In 1916, Hugh and Annie welcomed a healthy daughter, Julia Elizabeth Mangum, into the world. Hugh Leonard Mangum died of pneumonia in Roanoke, Virginia on March 12, 1922, at the age forty-four.

== Glass Plate Negatives And Photographs ==
One of Hugh Mangum's glass plate negatives, showing his diverse clientele.

Mangum used a Penny Picture portrait camera. After Hugh Mangum's death in 1922 from pneumonia at the age of forty-four, his glass plate negatives remained stored in his studio in a family owned tobacco pack barn. Hugh Mangum's relatives turned the barn into a henhouse and toolshed, where his negatives were buried under junk and chicken droppings. In the 1970s the negatives were moved to the greenhouse of Hugh's nephew.

Hugh Mangum’s last living sibling, Leo Mangum, died in 1968. The house and land were sold for commercial development that same year. With bulldozers on site, activist Margaret Nygard managed to necessitate an Environmental Impact Statement to stop the demolition of the buildings. During seven years of negotiations, the barn where hundreds of Hugh Mangum’s glass plate negatives were stored was left unoccupied, subject to vandals and the vagaries of weather. When the property was finally donated to the city of Durham for use as a park, the remaining negatives, some of them in scattered pieces, were rescued under the supervision of Margaret and Holger Nygard; Hugh Mangum’s nephew, Jack Vaughan; Durham photographer David Page; and North Carolina genealogist William Perry Johnson. It is very possible the negatives were donated to Duke without proper consent from his daughter, Julia Elizabeth Mangum.

Only Jack Vaughan entrusted the recovered glass plate negatives to the newly formed Eno River Association, founded by Margaret Nygard. David Page continued to work hard on behalf of Hugh Mangum’s legacy, writing letters and raising money to turn the pack house into the Hugh Mangum Museum of Photography. He spent years trying to track down photographs and uncover details about Mangum’s life and work. He hoped to one day publish a book about Hugh Mangum but was unable to complete the project before he died of cancer in 2011. In 1986, the Eno River Foundation donated Hugh Mangum’s negatives to the care and protection of Duke University, where they reside today. In 2006, Duke Libraries published 688 of those negatives as digitized positive images in an online collection.

== Exhibitions ==
- Ongoing (since 1986) Hugh Mangum Photography Museum, West Point on the Eno, Durham, NC. Open Sat & Sun, 10 am - 2 pm, April–December.
- 2009 “Beyond Beauty: Photographs from Duke University Special Collections Library”, curated by Sarah Schroth, Nancy Hanks, Margaret Sartor, Karen Glynn, Patricia Leighten and Margaret Morrison, Nasher Museum of Art
- 2012 "Keep All You Wish: The Photographs of Hugh Mangum," curated by Sarah Stacke for the Center for Documentary Studies at Duke University
- 2014 "Hugh Mangum on Main Street," curated by Sarah Stacke for the Museum of Durham History
- 2015 "Keep All You Wish: The Photographs of Hugh Mangum," curated by Sarah Stacke for the Asheville Art Museum
- 2019 "Where We Find Ourselves: The Photographs of Hugh Mangum, 1897 – 1922”, curated by Margaret Sartor and Alex Harris, Nasher Museum of Art.
- 2020 “Hugh Mangum: Where We Find Ourselves", curated by Margaret Sartor, Alex Harris, and Juan Curto, Camara Oscura Galeria De Arte, Madrid.
- 2021 “Hugh Mangum: American Visionary 1897-1922", MB Abram, Los Angeles.
- 2021 “The Photographs of Hugh Mangum, 1897-1922", ACA Galleries, New York.
- 2022 “Where We Find Ourselves: Hugh Mangum", DeLand Museum, DeLand, Florida.

== Collections ==
The collection of Mangum’s glass plate negatives are held in the David M. Rubenstein Rare Book & Manuscript Library, Duke University. The collection is digitized and available online.

Mangum's photographic equipment, as well as historic prints are in the collection of Hugh Mangum Museum of Photography in Durham, North Carolina.

== Bibliography ==
- Photos Day or Night: The Archive of Hugh Mangum, by Sarah Stacke with texts by Maurice Wallace and Martha Sumler. Red Hook Editions, 2018. ISBN 978-1941703083.
- Where We Find Ourselves: The Photographs of Hugh Mangum, 1897–1922, by Margaret Sartor and Alex Harris. Foreword by Deborah Willis. Introduction by Michael Lesy. In association with Center for Documentary Studies at Duke University. Published by The University of North Carolina Press, Chapel Hill, 2019. ISBN 978-1469648316
- Stacke, Sarah (2013, August 27). A Penny Picture Photographer in the American South. New York Times. https://lens.blogs.nytimes.com/2013/08/27/a-penny-picture-photographer-in-the-american-south/
- Stacke, Sarah (2015, September 23). On Hugh Mangum. Aperture. https://aperture.org/editorial/report-hugh-mangum/
- Stacke, Sarah (2019, June 3). A new book of photographs offers a penetrating look at the segregated South during Redemption and Jim Crow. Washington Post. https://www.washingtonpost.com/photography/2019/06/03/new-book-photographs-offers-penetrating-gaze-into-segregated-south-during-redemption-jim-crow/
- Stacke, Sarah (2018, December 23). Photos Day Or Night: How One Photographer Documented The Segregated South. National Public Radio. https://www.npr.org/sections/pictureshow/2018/12/23/677369739/photos-day-or-night-how-one-photographer-documented-the-segregated-south
- Casey, Brenna M. (2021, August 29). Art, Power, and Profit at Duke University. The Assembly. https://www.theassemblync.com/education/higher-education/art-power-and-profit-at-duke-university-hugh-mangum/
