= Durham Township, Durham County, North Carolina =

Township in Durham County, North Carolina, U.S.

Coordinates: 36°00′00″N 78°54′35″W

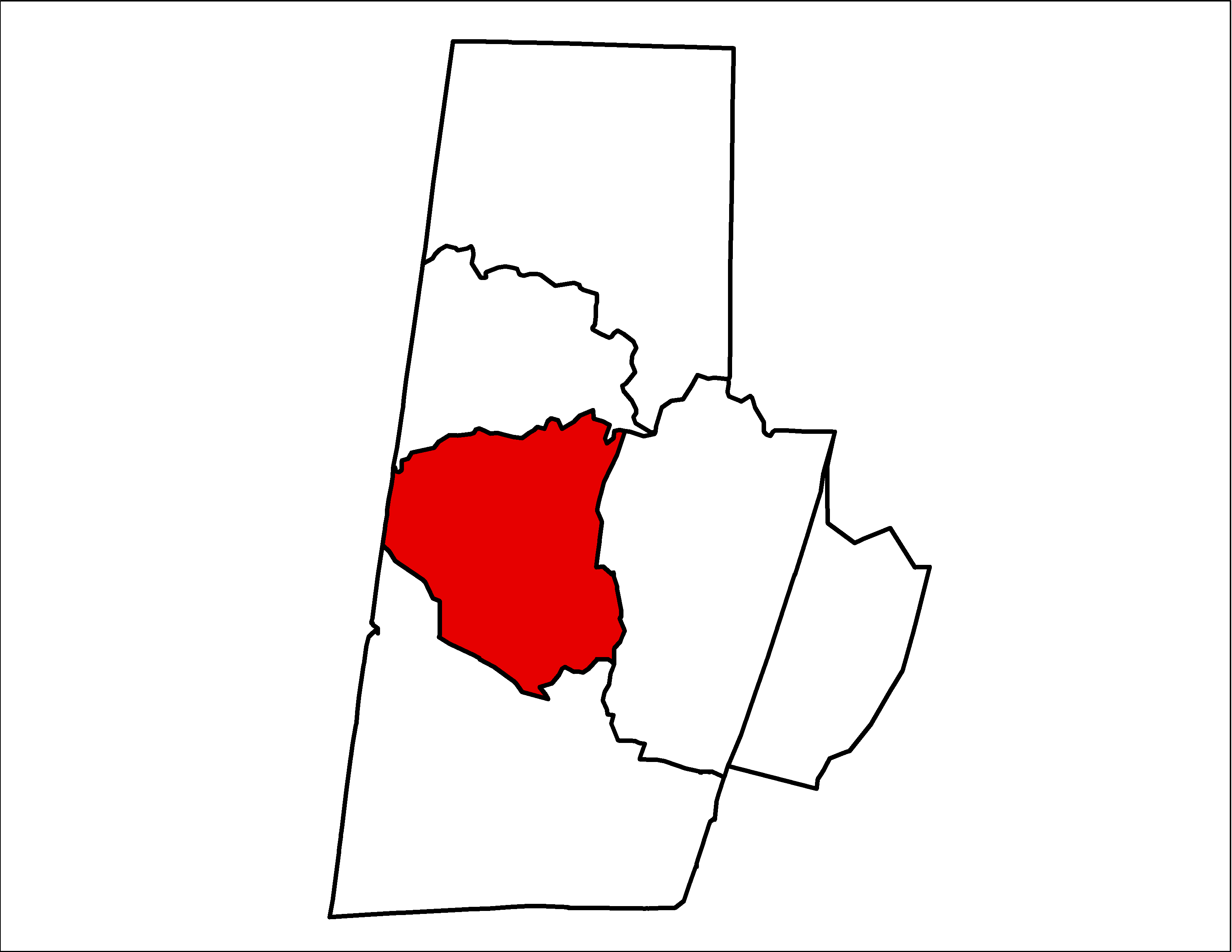
Location of Durham Township in Durham County, N.C.

Durham Township is one of six townships in Durham County, North Carolina, United States. The township had a population of 103,863, according to the 2000 census and is currently the most populous township in Durham County.

Geographically, Durham Township occupies 41.28 square miles (106.9 km^{2}) in central Durham County. The township is almost completely occupied by portions of the city of Durham, the county seat of Durham County.
