= Little River attacks =

1981 violent anti-gay attacks in Durham, North Carolina

- Historic marker commemorating the attack and subsequent LGBTQ pride march
- Location: Durham, North Carolina
- Date: 12 April 1981; 45 years ago (US Eastern time (UTC−05:00))
- Attack type: Beating, drowning
- Weapon: wooden club
- Deaths: 1
- Victims: Ronald Antonevitch; Darrel Jones; Mark DeMarias; Jerry Penny
- Perpetrators: Chris Lee Richardson; Guy Charles Osbahr
- Motive: Homophobia

The Little River attacks were a set of anti-gay violent hate crimes that took place along the Little River in Durham, North Carolina on April 12, 1981. The attacks, which culminated with the murder of Ronald "Sonny" Antonevitch, were a defining moment in the LGBTQ rights movement in North Carolina, leading to the state's first Pride march.

== Background ==
The Little River, a tributary of the Eno River in Durham, North Carolina, was a popular swimming hole and gathering place for LGBTQ people in the 1970s and early 1980s. Local gay men and lesbian women often gathered slightly east of a bridge on Johnson Mill Road. The spot was frequented by white and black LGBTQ residents.

Occasionally, gay men would cruise for sex in the woods surrounding the river, but the majority of visitors went to swim and sunbathe, often in the nude.

== Attacks ==
On Palm Sunday, April 12, 1981, Chris Lee Richardson and Guy Charles Osbahr attacked four men at the swimming hole, resulting in one death. They broke limbs off of trees and smashed them into club-length sections.

The pair approached Jerry "Michael" Penny, later the owner of the local gay nightclub Boxer's, and allegedly taunted him saying, "you're going to that queer water hole", to which Penny responded that he was heterosexual. The pair attacked Penny, cracking most of his teeth and knocking out others. According to Penny, Richardson then declared, "I am going to kill your motherfucking queer ass" and, as Penny turned to retreat back to his car, he was hit in the back with a tree limb and then was hit across the face with a branch. The pair then taunted him as he got up and walked away. Penny called 911 and the dispatcher allegedly told him that he "shouldn't have been down there anyway". No police were dispatched to the river at that time.

Following the attack on Penny, Richardson rallied his friends to confront gay men sunbathing along the river. There, he came across Mark DeMarais and Darryl Jones, a gay couple. Richardson yelled homophobic threats at the couple while hitting DeMarais on the arm and Jones in the back with a club made from a tree branch. The couple fled toward the water to warn around a dozen other gay men before they escaped through the woods.

The two men then approached Ronald "Sonny" Antonevitch striking him in the head and the side. Antonevitch, who was recovering from surgery, was unable to defend himself as Richardson and Osbahr beat him and held his head under the water.

== Aftermath ==
Penny was treated for his injuries at Durham County General Hospital. Antonevitch was taken to the same hospital, where he slipped into a coma. Antonevitch was transferred to North Carolina Memorial Hospital for sugery in Chapel Hill, where he succumbed to his injuries on April 15, 1981.

Richardson and Osbahr were arrested and granted court-appointed lawyers. Richardson went on trial for second-degree murder in September 1981, where it was revealed that he was previously charged with domestic abuse and attempting to run over a public safety officer. Osbahr became a witness for the state and entered a plea deal, reducing his crime to involuntary manslaughter. Osbahr, who was sentenced to 8 years in prison, claimed that Richardson had threatened to kill him if he testified against him. Richardson was found guilty for second-degree murder and assault with a deadly weapon causing serious injury and was sentenced to twenty-five years to life in prison.

On Good Friday, April 24th, 1981, a group many wearing pink triangles held a vigil. More than 150 people protested at the University of North Carolina at Chapel Hill. The demonstration was the first gay pride march in North Carolina.

Local lesbian activist Debbie Swanner and Duke University student David Ransom organized a large demonstration, "Our Day Out", on June 27, 1981, which was Durham's first march for lesbian and gay rights. The crowd of 300 people marched through the city's downtown starting at Five Points Plaza and looping past the courthouse. The march was the precursor to the annual Durham Pride Parade which was established in 1986.

In 2016, Kym Register, a local musician and owner of The Pinhook, wrote the song "Little River" about the attacks.

A historical marker was approved in 2025 to be placed in 2026, commemorating the 1981 protest as North Carolina’s first pride march. The marker, which is North Carolina's first LGBTQ pride historic marker, was placed in October 2026 and unveiled at 501 W. Main St. in Durham. It is numbered G-147 and reads "First LGBTQ Pride March in N.C., June 27, 1981. Advocated for rights & visibility. Sparked by deadly assault at Little River, 10 miles North."
