= Carr Township, Durham County, North Carolina =

Townships in North Carolina, United States

Coordinates: 35°57′31″N 78°45′44″W

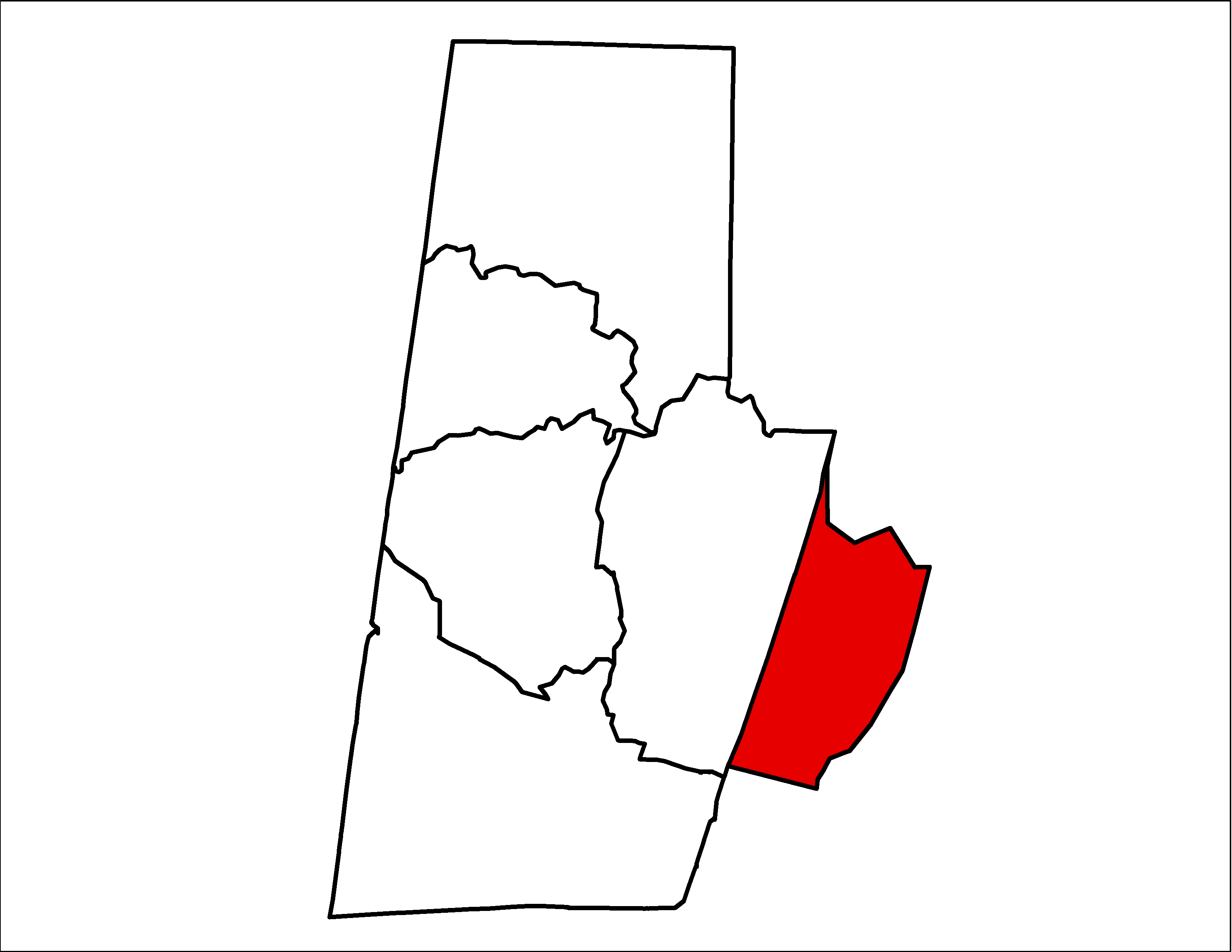
Location of Carr Township in Durham County, N.C.

Carr Township is one of six townships in Durham County, North Carolina, United States. The township had a population of 2,441 according to the 2010 census.

Geographically, Carr Township occupies 27.25 square miles (70.6 km^{2}) in eastern Durham County. The township is occupied by small portions of the city of Falls Lake. The township is named in honor of Julian S. Carr, and it was created from portions of Cedar Fork Township in Wake County, along with parts of Oak Grove Township, in a 1911 transfer to Durham County.
