= Eno River State Park =

State park in North Carolina, United States

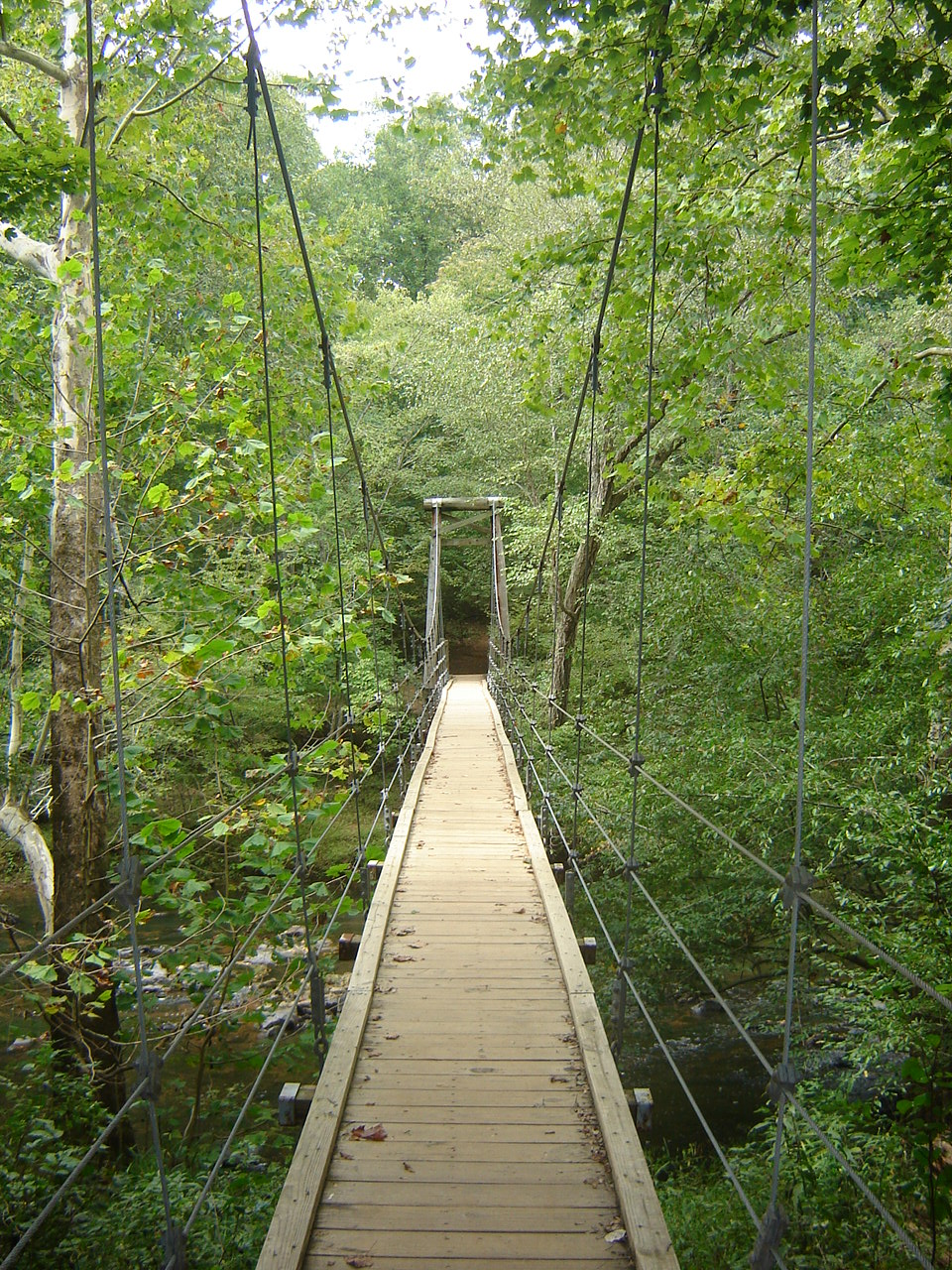
- Eno Park Footbridge

- Location within North Carolina Location within the United States
- Interactive map of Eno River State Park
- Location: Durham and Orange counties, North Carolina, United States
- Coordinates: 36°04′42″N 79°00′18″W
- Area: 4,319 acres (1,748 ha)
- Established: 1973
- Administrator: North Carolina Division of Parks and Recreation
- Website: Official website

Map of the Eno River State Park

Eno River State Park is a 4,319-acre (17.48 km^{2}) North Carolina state park in Durham and Orange Counties, North Carolina. Together with the adjoining West Point on the Eno city park, the two parks preserve over 14 miles (22.5 km) of the Eno River and surrounding lands.

There are five public access areas with features including twenty-four miles of hiking trails, canoe launches, picnic areas, and historic structures.

== Trails ==
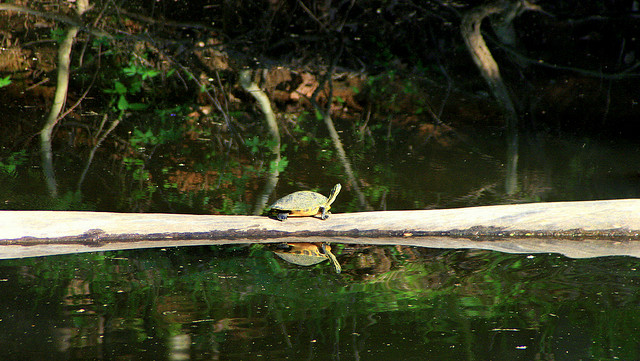
Wildlife is plentiful in the park

=== Buckquarter Creek ===
Beginning at the parking lot for the Piper-Cox Museum, the Buckquarter Creek Trail goes up the river at Few's Ford. A staircase takes visitors to a view of the Eno River rapids down below. This 1.5-mile (2.4 km) loop is marked by red blazes. Holden Mill loop and the Ridge Trail branch off from the Buckquarter Creek Trail.

=== Cabelands ===
The Cabelands Trail is 1.2 miles (1.9 km) long and is marked by red blazes. The trail passes through the few remains of the Cabe Mill. The stretch of the river is very rocky and is usually known as Cabe's Gorge.

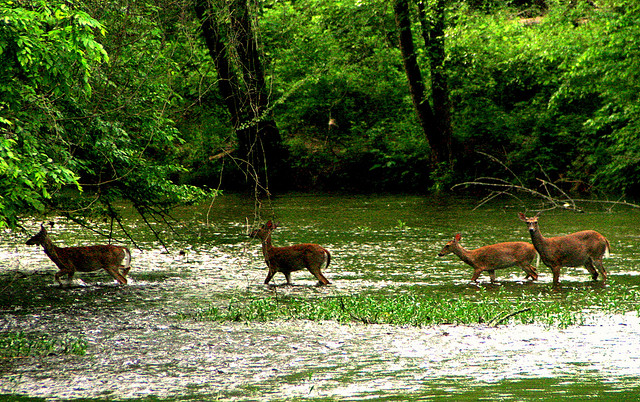
White-tailed deer as seen from the trails

=== Cox Mountain ===
The Cox Mountain Trail is marked by blue blazes. The 3.75-mile (6.04 km) trail passes a picnic area and crosses the suspension foot bridge. The trail goes up 270 feet (82 m) in elevation and at one point follows Hillsborough Coach Road. When getting closer to Cox Mountain, the trail can get fairly steep. The trail connects to Fanny's Ford trail.

=== Eno Quarry ===
Eno Quarry Trail is marked by blue blazes and is a 0.42-mile (0.68 km) loop. In the 1960s, stone was removed from the Eno Quarry Trail to aid in construction of Interstate 85. The quarry is now the site of a 4-acre (16,000 m^{2}) pond. The trail has several spots that are good for fishing.

=== Eno Trace ===
Eno Trace is a nature trail with several information kiosks pointing out wildlife. There is a short set of steps and at one point the trail follows alongside the river.

=== Fanny's Ford ===
Fanny's Ford Trail is a 1.01-mile (1.63 km) loop and is mostly made up of flat ground and gentle hills. The trail is around the Cox Mountain trail and Hillsborough Coach Road, and at one point passes through the Few Mill's race. The trail is marked by purple blazes.

=== Holden Mill ===
The Holden Mill trail is a combination of two loops and is 2.6 miles (4.2 km) long. The larger eastern loop follows the river bank for almost a mile, before climbing a 250-foot (76 m) rise in elevation. The smaller loop is a hike around the remains of Holden's Mill, but also follows the river at parts. It is marked by yellow blazes.

=== Shakori ===
The Shakori Trail is a scenic 1.04-mile (1.67 km) hike marked by yellow U-shaped blazes. Hikers can view the remains of a 19th-century house and an old saw mill site. There is a 200-foot (61 m) elevation change.

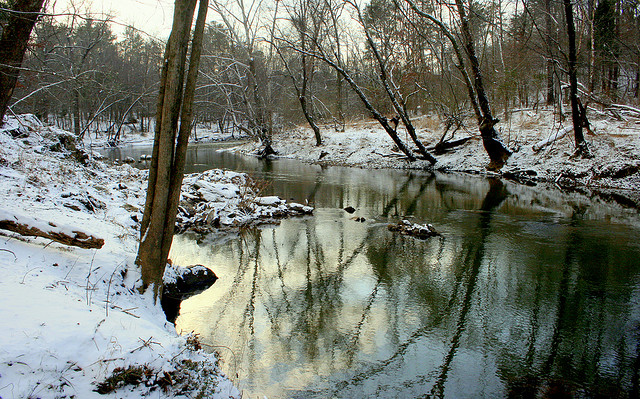
View from Laurel Bluffs trail

=== Laurel Bluffs ===
This trail starts at an intersection with the Pump Station Trail and goes east to Guess Road. It is 2.49 miles (4.01 km) long and generally stays close to the river except for short sections where cliffs and bluffs force it up and around on ridges. The trail passes the chimney and foundation of an old hunting lodge, the mostly-intact Guess Mill Dam, enters the millrace and comes out at the chimney at the Guess Mill site. Future plans are for Laurel Bluffs Trail to extend west to Cabelands Trail and to connect with West Point on the Eno city park trails. This connection will be a component of the Mountains-to-Sea Trail.

=== Pump Station ===
The Pump Station Trail is known as the best spring wildflower trail in the park. It begins at the Nancy Rhodes Creek bridge on Rivermont Road and makes a 1.5 miles (2.4 km) loop. It is generally an easy hike with only a few gentle hills. The foundations of Durham's first water pumping station are near the river at the northeast section of the loop.

== History ==
Native Americans of the Eno, Shakori and Occoneechee tribes lived along the river prior to European settlement. Some of the tribes merged in the late 17th century and established a village near present-day Durham.

Settlers moved to the area later to set up farms and gristmills. More than thirty mills were located on the Eno River. By the 1940s the last of the mills ceased operations.

Efforts to protect the Eno River started in 1965 when the city of Durham proposed building a reservoir in the river valley. Margaret Nygard, a British resident of the area, rallied concerned citizens to campaign and save the Eno. They formed the Association for the Preservation of the Eno River Valley, typically known as the Eno River Association. The association proposed the establishment of a state park and after battling with developers and planners for nearly a decade, the state of North Carolina approved the idea in 1973. In 1975, the state—with help from the Eno River Association and the Nature Conservancy—acquired more than 1,000 acres (4 km^{2}) of land for the park.

== The Eno River Association ==
The Eno River Association was established in 1966 and played an important role in creating the park. Since its inception it has purchased more than 4900 acres (20 km^{2}) for the park. As a part of its conservation role the group engages in public outreach, notably producing the annual Festival for the Eno.

The Festival for the Eno brings an average 30,000 visitors during three days in July. The festival includes music, crafts, food, and promotes environmental awareness. The proceeds are a major source of funding for the Eno River Association.

== See also ==
- Eno River
- West Point on the Eno
- Mountains-to-Sea Trail
