= The Pinhook =

Music venue in Durham, North Carolina

- The Pinhook in 2026
- Interactive map of The Pinhook
- Address: 117 West Main Street
- Location: Durham, North Carolina, U.S.
- Coordinates: 35.9953°N 78.9015°W
- Owner: Kym Register
- Type: Music venue

Construction
- Opened: 2008

Website
- thepinhook.com

The Pinhook is an LGBTQ-owned music venue in Durham, North Carolina. It is located on the first floor of 117 West Main Street in the Downtown Durham Historic District.

== History ==
=== Building ===
The building at 117 W Main Street was constructed in the 1890s and is one of the oldest remaining structures in Downtown Durham. In the 1960s, the building housed Marilyn's Shoes. In 1987, Baldwin's Department Store moved into the building.

=== Venue ===
The Pinhook was founded by Kym Register, Elizabeth Albrecht, and Nick Williams in 2008 as an LGBTQ-owned punk music venue. The trio opened the space following the closure of Bull City Headquarters in 2008, a venue that was operated by a collective that Register was a member of. Pinhook's name is in reference to an early settlement built in the 1800s in modern-day West Durham, where the Erwin Cotton Mills were built.

It was the second LGBTQ music venue on Main Street in Durham, following Boxer's Ringside, which was owned by Little River attacks survivor Jerry Michael Penny and operated from 1989 to 2007. Although LGBTQ-owned and the recognized as a gay bar, Pinhook is not specifically a gay bar, but rather a music venue. Bands and artists of various genres have performed at The Pinhook including Hurray for the Riff Raff, Future Islands, Megafaun, Sylvan Esso, and Big Freedia.
