= Boxer's Ringside =

Gay bar in North Carolina, US (2000–2007)

- Ringside
- 308 W Main Street in 2026
- Interactive map of Boxer's Ringside
- Former names: Boxer's
- Location: 308 W Main Street; Durham, North Carolina, U.S.
- Coordinates: 35.9963°N 78.9026°W
- Owner: Jerry Michael Penny
- Type: Gay bar Music venue

Construction
- Built: c.1906
- Opened: 2000
- Closed: 2007

Boxer's Ringside, sometimes simply called Ringside, was an LGBTQ bar and music venue in Durham, North Carolina. The first location, known as Boxer's, opened in 1989 and was located on NC 15-501. The second location, 308 W Main Street, was in the city's downtown district.

== History ==
308 West Main Street was built circa 1906 by John Sprunt Hill and first served as a physician's office and pharmacy for C. E. King and Sons, and as the space for the Durham Art Shop. In the 1950s, the building housed the Martin Jewelry Company and in the 1960s it was home to Friedman's Jewelers.

In May 2000, the building became Boxer's Ringside, a gay nightclub that operated all three floors. The club was owned by Jerry Michael Penny, a member of the family who owned Penny Furniture and a survivor of the 1981 anti-gay Little River attacks in north Durham. He previously operated Boxer's, which originally opened in 1989, from a flying saucer-shaped building located off of NC 15-501 by the New Hope Commons shopping center. The original location operated as a dance club but upon moving to the downtown location, Boxer's Ringside operated as a music venue and bar. Upon moving downtown, the original location became a bar called The Tavern.

Boxer's Ringside was designed in the style of a French Quarter speakeasy as an homage to New Orleans, where Penny lived for ten years before returning to Durham. The interior of the ground floor featured a vintage front desk and a dinner club-style bar decorated with sconces. The second floor featured a balcony with elaborate railing and a large statue of the Roman god Mercury in flight. The third story of the club, decorated with velvet drapes, was a performance space and dance floor where bands and musicians would perform. On the wall was a vintage boxing photograph featuring one man in the nude and another wearing a joxstrap. On the building's fourth floor was a library decorated with built-in bookshelves, fringe Victorian lamps, gilt-frame oil paintings, a video projector, and a retractable screen.

In the 2000s, Jenn Duerr, the program director of the Durham Association of Downtown Arts, helped Boxer's Ringside book local independent bands to host live shows, starting with the Durham Band Showcase. On Saturday nights, the club featured local disc jockeys. Bands that performed at Boxer's Ringside include Malt Swagger, Cold Sides, Des Ark, The Sleepies, The Samples, Cody Cods, Holy Roman Empire, Razzel, Mais Oui, Roxotica, and Rhythm Light Orchestra.

On February 13, 2002, the building exterior was featured on episode 15 of the 5th season of the television series Dawson's Creek as a "sketchy Bostonian establishment" where Joey Potter (played by Katie Holmes) is robbed at gunpoint.

In 2008, following the club's closure in 2007, a new LGBTQ-owned music venue called The Pinhook opened up down the street.

Since 2016, 308 W Main Street has been occupied by a realty office.
