= Triangle Township, Durham County, North Carolina =

Coordinates: 35.9367175°N 78.9981021°W

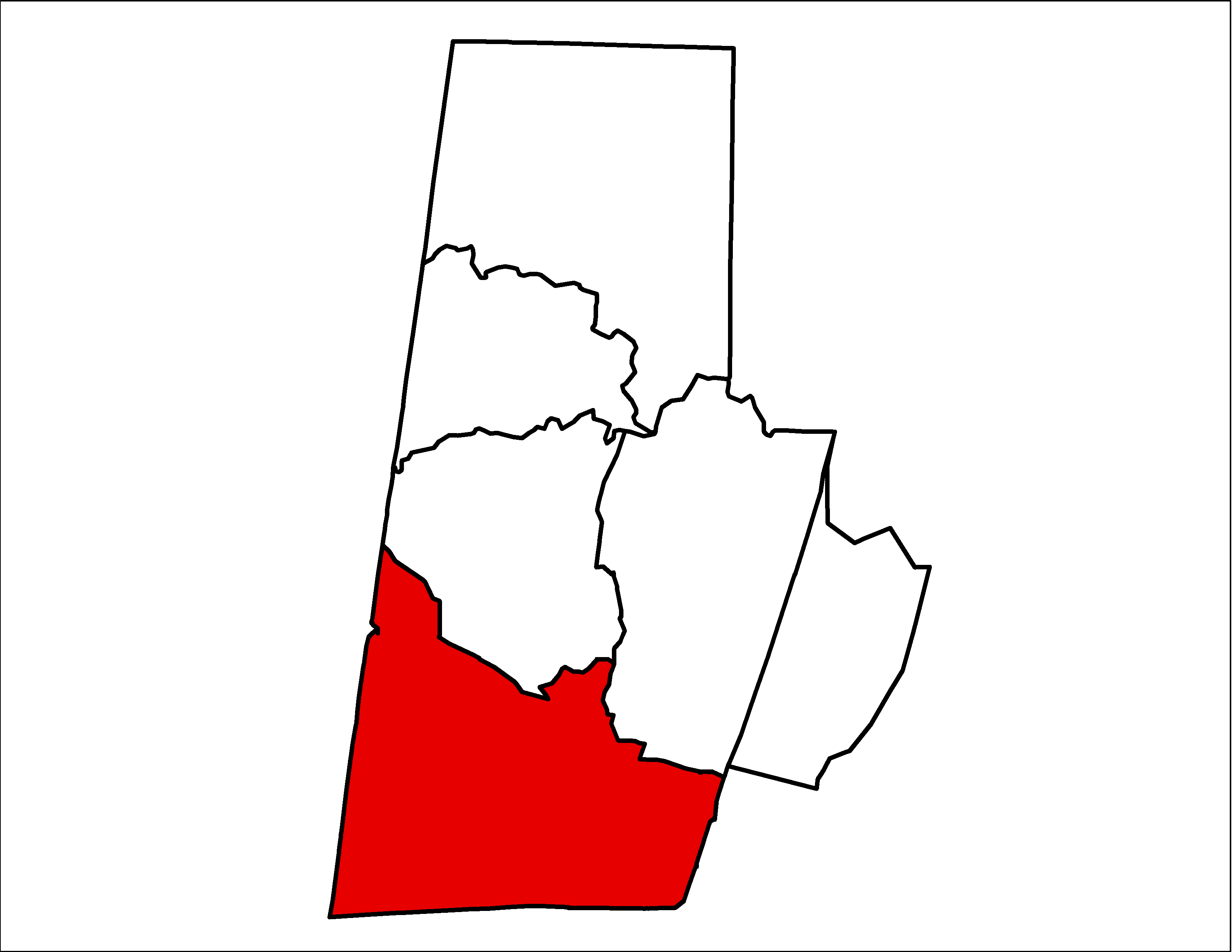
Location of Triangle Township in Durham County, N.C.

Triangle Township is one of six townships in Durham County, North Carolina, United States. The township had a population of 67,870 according to the 2000 census. The township had a population of 324,833 according to the 2020 census.

Geographically, Triangle Township occupies 73.85 square miles (191.3 km^{2}) in southern Durham County and is the largest township in the county by land area. The township is almost completely occupied by portions of the city of Durham, the county seat of Durham County.

Triangle Township consists of the former Patterson Township in the southwest (originally, Patterson was an Orange County township) and Cedar Fork Township in the southeast (Cedar Fork was carved from Wake County's Cedar Fork Township).
