= Occoneechee Mountain State Natural Area =

State park in North Carolina, United States

- IUCN category III (natural monument or feature)
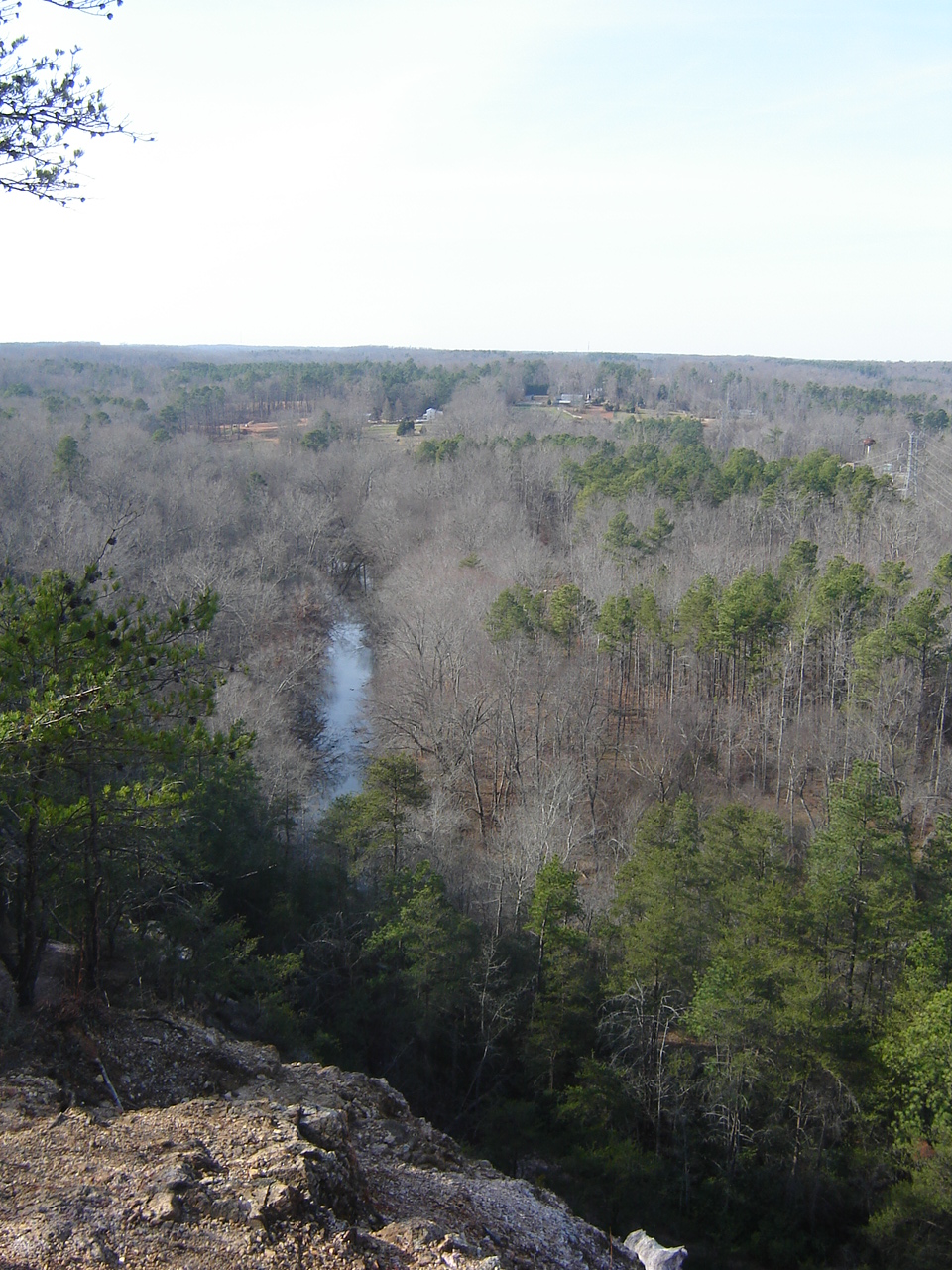
- Outlook at Occoneechee

- Location within North Carolina Location within the United States
- Location: Orange, North Carolina, United States
- Coordinates: 36°03′43.2144″N 79°07′15.2574″W
- Area: 221 acres (89 ha)
- Established: 1997
- Named for: Occaneechi Tribe
- Governing body: North Carolina Division of Parks and Recreation
- Website: Occoneechee Mountain State Natural Area

Occoneechee Mountain State Natural Area is a North Carolina state park in Orange County, North Carolina in the United States. Located adjacent to the town of Hillsborough, it covers 221 acres (0.89 km^{2}) and includes Occoneechee Mountain, the highest point (867 ft) in Orange County and a settlement of the Occaneechi tribe.

== History ==
Rising more than 350 feet (110 m) from the Eno River, the Occoneechee Mountain summit is the highest point in Orange County.

Researchers believe that the area's habitat has remained relatively unchanged since the last ice age due to the presence of the brown elfin, a rare butterfly, and several unique plant species. The brown elfin is typically found in mountainous and northern areas, and the nearest brown elfin population to Occoneechee is more than 100 miles (160 km) west. When the Piedmont's habitat underwent enormous transformations after the Ice Age, the area became unable to support the brown elfin and other species more accustomed to cooler environments. Brown elfins, believed to have once populated the Piedmont, were restricted to the state's mountains. However, the brown elfin butterflies at Occoneechee Mountain remained.

The land the state natural area now sits on was originally settled by the Occaneechi Band of the Saponi Nation, who traveled to the mountain from the west. In the colonial period, European immigrants settled the area. Until 1987, a mill village occupied a section of the natural area. The NC Division of Parks and Recreation first purchased land at Occoneechee Mountain in December 1997. Since then, the natural area has grown to 221 acres (0.89 km^{2})

== Recreation ==
Occoneechee Mountain State Natural Area features over 3 miles of trails, as well as fishing and picnic areas. The park's trail network also connects to the paved Hillsborough Riverwalk trail, which extends east along the Eno River towards downtown Hillsborough.Since 2019 the area has hosted the annual Ochoneeche Mountain Challenge, a 10 mile race from Occoneechee Mountain to the Occoneechee Speedway and back.

== Nearby state parks ==
The following state parks are within 30 miles (48 km) of Occoneechee Mountain State Natural Area:

- Eno River State Park
- Falls Lake State Recreation Area
- Jordan Lake State Recreation Area
- William B. Umstead State Park
