= Cedar Fork Township, Wake County, North Carolina =

Township in central North Carolina, United States

Coordinates: 35°51′40″N 78°48′53″W

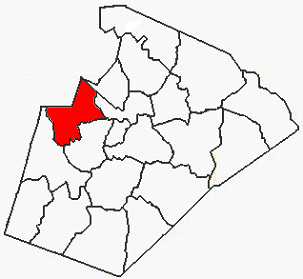

Cedar Fork Township (also designated Township 5) is one of twenty townships within Wake County, North Carolina, United States. As of the 2010 United States census, Cedar Fork Township had a population of 40,841, a 274.3% increase over 2000.

Cedar Fork Township, occupying 36.5 square miles (94.6 km^{2}) in northwestern Wake County, includes all of the town of Morrisville, portions of Cary, Raleigh, and the Research Triangle Park, as well as the Raleigh-Durham International Airport.

The southeastern portion of Triangle Township in Durham County that borders Wake County was originally a separate Durham township also named Cedar Fork.
