= Little River Reservoir (North Carolina) =

Reservoir in Durham, North Carolina

Coordinates: 36°7′37″N 78°52′28″W

- Interactive map of Little River Reservoir
- Location: Durham, North Carolina
- Built: 1988
- Average depth: 355 feet (108 m)

The Little River Reservoir is located in Durham, North Carolina, United States, and is one of the main sources of drinking water for the city of Durham. It was formed by the construction of a dam along the Little River.

== History ==
The reservoir was created by a dam completed in 1988. It hosts a city park that offers fishing facilities including boat, canoe, and kayak rentals, along with picnic tables and restrooms. Private boats are not permitted on the reservoir.

Current and historical water levels for the reservoir are publicly available.

In cooperation with Raleigh, Wake Forest, Wendell, and Zebulon in North Carolina, Wake County, North Carolina is also planning a reservoir on the Little River. The project has been postponed pending environmental studies.

== See also ==
- Little River attacks
