= West Point on the Eno =

Historic district in North Carolina, United States

- U.S. National Register of Historic Places
- U.S. Historic district
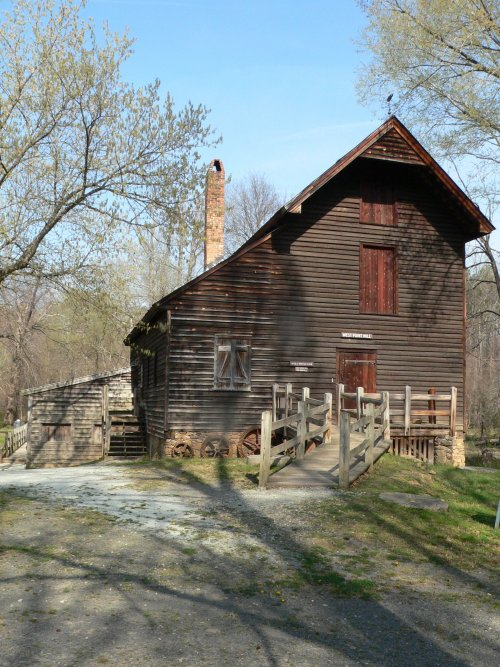
- Mill at West Point on the Eno

- Location within North Carolina Location within the United States
- Location: 5101 N Roxboro St., Durham, North Carolina
- Coordinates: 36°4′11″N 78°54′31″W
- Architectural style: Greek Revival, Georgian
- MPS: Durham MRA
- NRHP reference No.: 85001776
- Added to NRHP: August 09, 1985

West Point on the Eno is a city park and historical center covering 412 acres (1.67 km^{2}) in Durham, Durham County, North Carolina.

Several historical structures are conserved on the site:

- West Point Mill - a reproduction colonial-era mill that is now a museum.
- Hugh Mangum Museum of Photography - located in the restored tobacco packhouse, features historic photographs from the late 19th and early 20th century from negatives found in the packhouse, also historic camera equipment
- McCown-Mangum House - home to one of the mill's owners, restored 1850s farmhouse with late 19th-century furnishings, open for tours

Other facilities include:

- Amphitheatre - includes a large open field, lawn seating, stage, electricity, water, parking
- 5 miles of trails
- Picnic facilities
- Canoe access to the Eno River
- Natural Play Space - a play area for children

== Closure and renovation ==
In 2026 the City of Durham announced that it was closing the park for about six months starting in July to complete a $5.3 million renovation, including improved accessibility and a new playground.

== History ==
The Eno Indians first used this area to fish, hunt, and grow crops. Arrowheads left behind by the tribe can still be found today.

When white settlers came to the area they noticed the springs that contained freshwater, which motivated them to invest in building mills across the area. The first mill built in the Eno was named Synott's Mill, which started operating in 1752 by Michael Synott, an almost legendary pioneer, who had problems in his personal life and appeared in court often. Shortly after Michael Synott died in 1780 the area was purchased by William Thetford and Charles Abercrombie, who built West Point Mill. While these mills were being produced a community began to build up and became known as West Point. The community was successful for a period of time but eventually all of its inhabitants died out or moved on. West Point Mill served its owners for 160 years until it was shut down by a paratrooper named Jacob Eller returning from the war in 1942, the last mill on the Eno to do so.

It was listed on the National Register of Historic Places in 1985.
