= Durham County, North Carolina =

County in North Carolina, United States

- County
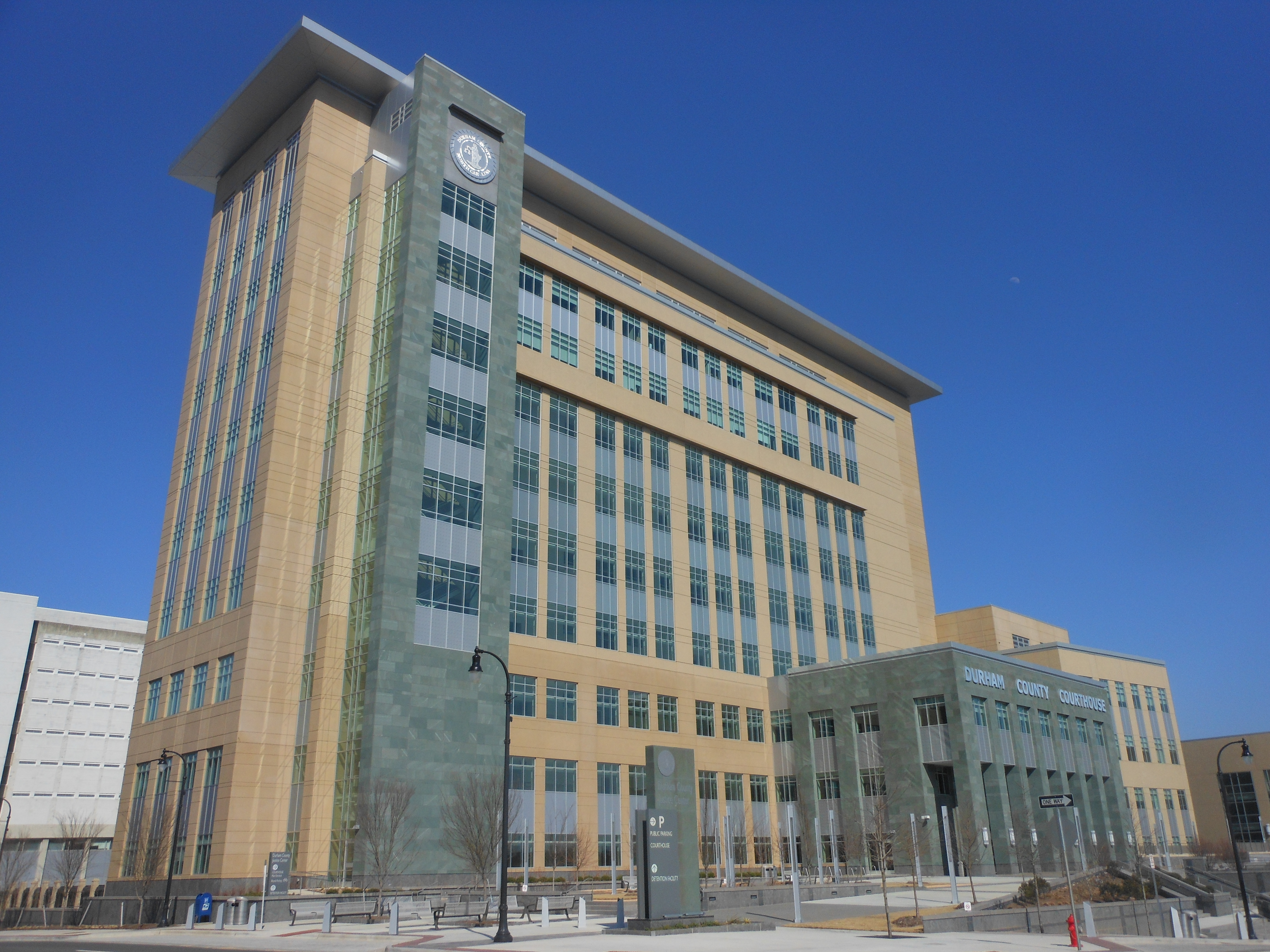
- Durham County Courthouse

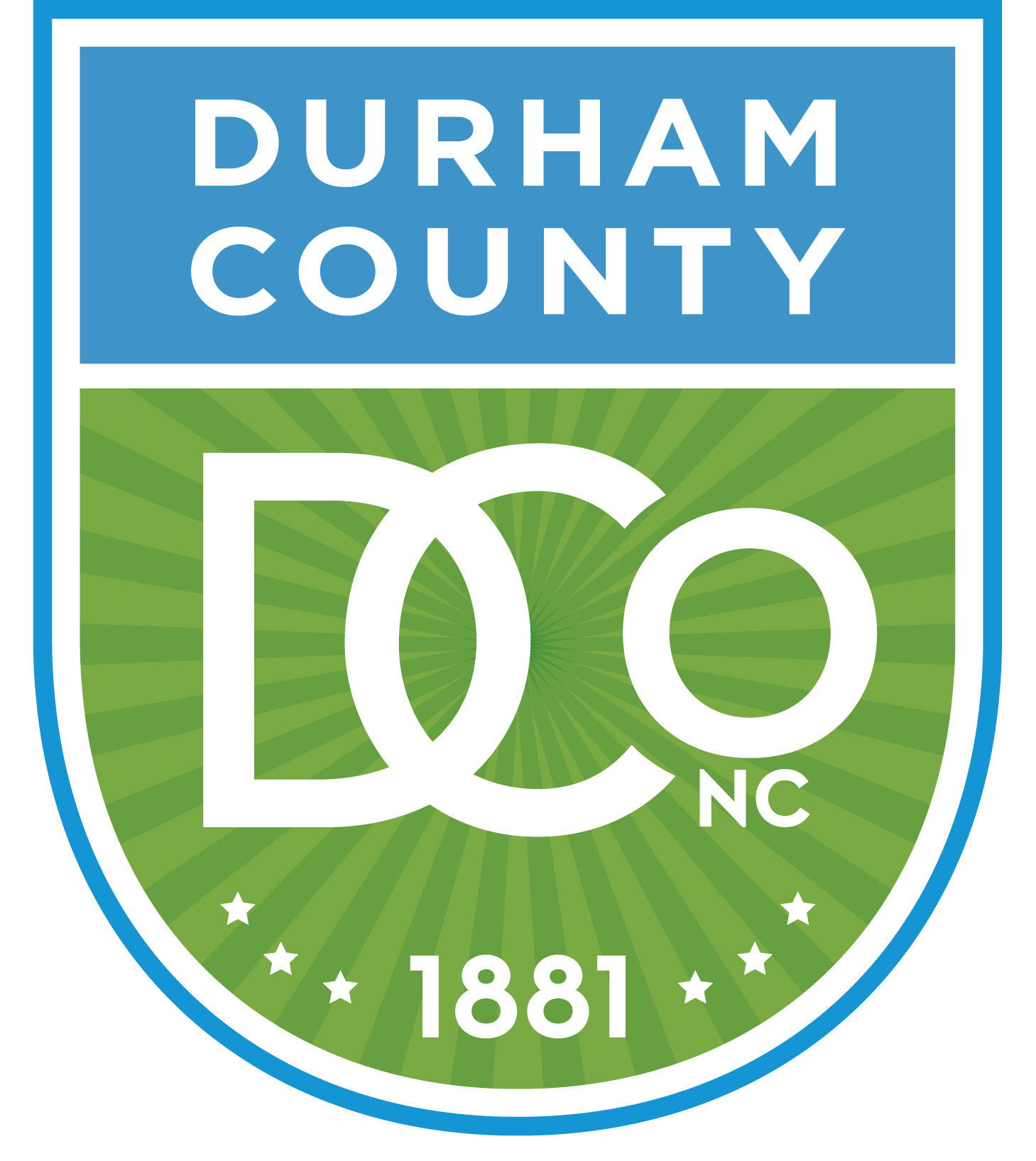
- Flag Seal Logo
- Motto: "Live. Grow. Thrive."
- Location within the U.S. state of North Carolina
- Interactive map of Durham County, North Carolina
- Coordinates: 36.03°N 78.88°W
- Country: United States
- State: North Carolina
- Founded: 1881
- Named for: Bartlett Snipes Durham
- Seat: Durham
- Largest community: Durham

Area
  - Total: 297.86 sq mi (771.5 km^{2})
  - Land: 286.53 sq mi (742.1 km^{2})
  - Water: 11.33 sq mi (29.3 km^{2}) 3.80%

Population (2020)
  - Total: 324,833
  - Estimate (2025): 347,240 ▲
  - Density: 1,133.7/sq mi (437.72/km^{2})
- Time zone: UTC−5 (Eastern)
  - Summer (DST): UTC−4 (EDT)
- Congressional district: 4th
- Website: dconc.gov

Durham County is a county in the U.S. state of North Carolina. As of the 2020 census, the population was 324,833, making it the sixth-most populous county in North Carolina. Its county seat is the city of Durham, which is the only incorporated municipality predominantly located within the county.

The central and southern parts of Durham County are highly urban, consisting of the city as well as several unincorporated suburbs. Southeastern Durham County is dominated by the Research Triangle Park, most of which is in Durham County. The northern third of Durham County is rural in nature. Durham County is the core of the Durham–Chapel Hill, NC Metropolitan Statistical Area, which is also included in the Raleigh–Durham–Cary, NC Combined Statistical Area, which had an estimated population of 2,368,947 in 2023.

== History ==
The county was formed on April 17, 1881, from parts of Orange County and Wake County, taking the name of its own county seat. In 1911, parts of Cedar Fork Township of Wake County were transferred to Durham County and became Carr Township.

Free African-American families began settling in the area that is now Durham County after the American Revolution. The free Black Jeffries, Weaver, Locklear, Hedgepeth, Revell, Day, and Chavis families migrated to the area before the formation of Durham County.

== Geography ==
According to the U.S. Census Bureau, the county has a total area of 297.86 square miles (771.5 km^{2}), of which 286.53 square miles (742.1 km^{2}) is land and 11.33 square miles (29.3 km^{2}) (3.80%) is water.

=== State and local protected areas/sites ===
- Bennett Place State Historic Site
- Butner-Falls of Neuse Game Land (part)
- Duke Homestead and Tobacco Factory
- East Durham Historic District
- Eno River State Park (part)
- Falls Lake State Recreation Area (part)
- Historic Stagville
- Hollow Rock Nature Park (part)
- Horton Grove Nature Preserve
- Jordan Game Land (part)
- Little River Regional Park and Natural Area (part)
- Mason Farm Biological Reserve (part)
- Museum of Life and Science
- Rolling View State Recreation Area (part)

=== Major water bodies ===
- B. Everett Jordan Lake
- Crabtree Creek
- Ellerbe Creek
- Eno River
- Falls Lake
- Flat River
- Lake Michie
- Little River
- Little River Reservoir
- New Hope Creek
- Stirrup Iron Creek

=== Adjacent counties ===
- Person County – north
- Granville County – northeast
- Wake County – east-southeast
- Chatham County – south
- Orange County – west

=== Major highways ===
- I-40
- I-85
- I-540 / NC 540 Toll
- I-885 / NC 885 Toll
- US 15
- US 15 Bus.
- US 70
- US 70 Bus. (Durham)
- US 70 Bus. (to Orange County)
- US 501
- NC 54
- NC 55
- NC 98
- NC 147
- NC 157
- NC 751
- NC 751 Truck (truck route)

=== Major infrastructure ===
- Durham Station

== Demographics ==
Historical population
Census	Pop.	Note	%±
1890	18,041		—
1900	26,233		45.4%
1910	35,276		34.5%
1920	42,219		19.7%
1930	67,196		59.2%
1940	80,244		19.4%
1950	101,639		26.7%
1960	111,995		10.2%
1970	132,681		18.5%
1980	152,785		15.2%
1990	181,835		19.0%
2000	223,314		22.8%
2010	267,587		19.8%
2020	324,833		21.4%
2025 (est.)	347,240	▲	6.9%
U.S. Decennial Census; 1790–1960 1900–1990; 1990–2000 2010–2020

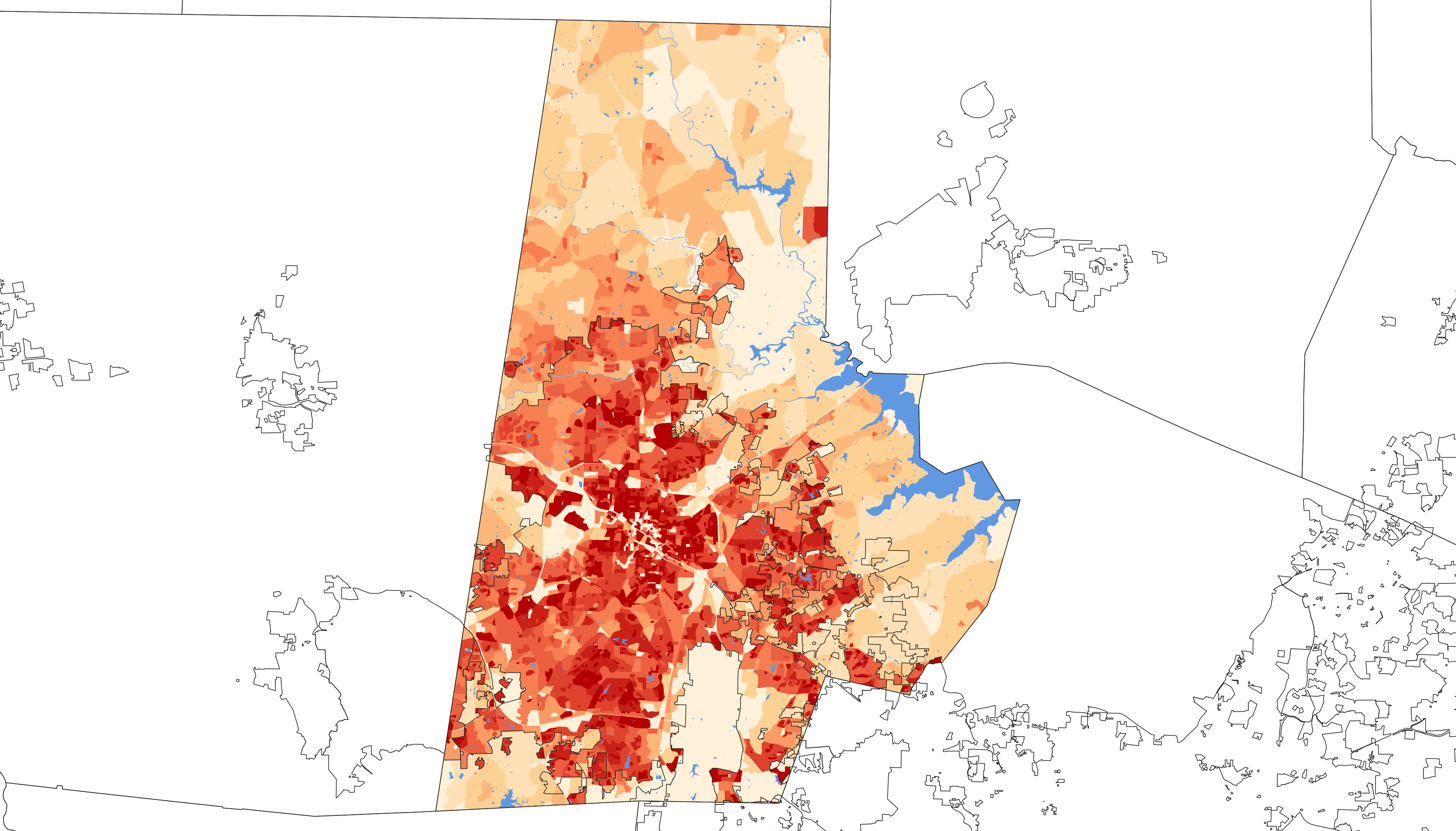
2020 population density of Durham County NC by census block

=== 2020 census ===
Durham County, North Carolina – Racial and ethnic composition Note: the US Census treats Hispanic/Latino as an ethnic category. This table excludes Latinos from the racial categories and assigns them to a separate category. Hispanics/Latinos may be of any race.
Race / Ethnicity (NH = Non-Hispanic)	Pop 1980	Pop 1990	Pop 2000	Pop 2010	Pop 2020	% 1980	% 1990	% 2000	% 2010	% 2020
White alone (NH)	95,086	108,722	107,371	112,697	133,768	62.24%	59.79%	48.08%	42.12%	41.18%
Black or African American alone (NH)	55,017	67,385	87,516	100,260	109,225	36.01%	37.06%	39.19%	37.47%	33.62%
Native American or Alaska Native alone (NH)	175	406	531	722	704	0.11%	0.22%	0.24%	0.27%	0.22%
Asian alone (NH)	979	3,189	7,311	12,180	16,707	0.64%	1.75%	3.27%	4.55%	5.14%
Native Hawaiian or Pacific Islander alone (NH)	x	x	65	135	83	x	x	0.03%	0.05%	0.03%
Other race alone (NH)	249	79	436	700	1,809	0.16%	0.04%	0.20%	0.26%	0.56%
Mixed race or Multiracial (NH)	x	x	3,045	4,816	12,433	x	x	1.36%	1.80%	3.83%
Hispanic or Latino (any race)	1,279	2,054	17,039	36,077	50,104	0.84%	1.13%	7.63%	13.48%	15.42%
Total	152,785	181,835	223,314	267,587	324,833	100.00%	100.00%	100.00%	100.00%	100.00%

As of the 2020 census, there were 324,833 people, 134,653 households, and 75,291 families residing in the county. The median age was 35.0 years; 20.1% of residents were under the age of 18 and 13.8% of residents were 65 years of age or older. For every 100 females there were 91.0 males, and for every 100 females age 18 and over there were 88.3 males age 18 and over.

There were 134,653 households in the county, of which 26.7% had children under the age of 18 living in them. Of all households, 38.3% were married-couple households, 19.9% were households with a male householder and no spouse or partner present, and 34.4% were households with a female householder and no spouse or partner present. About 33.1% of all households were made up of individuals and 9.2% had someone living alone who was 65 years of age or older.

There were 144,559 housing units, of which 6.9% were vacant. Among occupied housing units, 52.2% were owner-occupied and 47.8% were renter-occupied. The homeowner vacancy rate was 1.5% and the rental vacancy rate was 6.9%.

The racial makeup of the county was 42.9% White, 34.1% Black or African American, 0.7% American Indian and Alaska Native, 5.2% Asian, <0.1% Native Hawaiian and Pacific Islander, 9.9% from some other race, and 7.3% from two or more races. Hispanic or Latino residents of any race comprised 15.4% of the population.

94.9% of residents lived in urban areas, while 5.1% lived in rural areas.

=== 2000 census ===
At the 2000 census, there were 223,314 people, 89,015 households, and 54,032 families residing in the county. The population density was 769 people per square mile (297 people/km^{2}). There were 95,452 housing units at an average density of 329 units per square mile (127 units/km^{2}). The racial makeup of the county was 50.91% White, 39.46% Black or African American, 0.30% Native American, 3.29% Asian, 0.04% Pacific Islander, 4.21% from other races, and 1.80% from two or more races. 7.63% of the population were Hispanic or Latino of any race.

There were 89,015 households, out of which 29.10% had children under the age of 18 living with them, 42.00% were married couples living together, 14.80% had a female householder with no husband present, and 39.30% were non-families. 30.00% of all households were made up of individuals, and 7.00% had someone living alone who was 65 years of age or older. The average household size was 2.40 and the average family size was 2.99.

In the county, the age distribution was as follows: 22.90% under the age of 18, 12.80% from 18 to 24, 34.80% from 25 to 44, 19.80% from 45 to 64, and 9.70% who were 65 years of age or older. The median age was 32 years. For every 100 females there were 93.00 males. For every 100 females age 18 and over, there were 89.70 males.

The median income for a household in the county was $43,337, and the median income for a family was $53,223. Males had a median income of $35,939 versus $30,683 for females. The per capita income for the county was $23,156. About 9.80% of families and 13.40% of the population were below the poverty line, including 17.20% of those under age 18 and 12.30% of those age 65 or over.

=== Fertility rates ===
The fertility rates in Durham have remained relatively stable, with the fertility rates for females aged 15–44 between 2022 and 2024, being 53%, with women aged 30–34 making up approximately 91.1% of all births in Durham county. There have been about 20,604 births between 2022-2024.

== Law and government ==
Durham County Sheriff's Office
- Abbreviation: DCSO, DSO
- Motto: "Honor, Duty and Service."

Agency overview
- Formed: May 2, 1881
- Employees: 452
- Annual budget: $34,949,195

Jurisdictional structure
- Operations jurisdiction: Durham County, North Carolina, US
- General nature: Local civilian police

Operational structure
- Headquarters: 510 S Dillard St, Durham
- Sworn officers: 181 deputies; 211 detention officers
- Civilians: 59
- Agency executive: Clarence Birkhead, Sheriff

Facilities
- Sub-Stations: 2

Notables
- Award: CALEA Accredited

Website
- Official website

Durham County is a member of the Central Pines Regional Council. Durham County is governed by a five-member board of county commissioners, currently consisting of Chair Brenda A. Howerton, Vice Chair Wendy Jacobs, Nimasheena Burns, Heidi Carter, and Nida Allam. All are elected concurrently, and each elected member serves a four-year term. The current sheriff, Clarence Birkhead, was elected in 2018 and is the county's first African American Sheriff to hold office.

=== Politics ===
Durham County is consistently one of the most Democratic counties in North Carolina, favoring Democrats in national, state, and local elections. It has only voted for the Republican candidate twice since 1884, in the Republican landslides of 1928 and 1972. George H. W. Bush is the last Republican to manage even 40 percent of the county's vote. Since the 1990s, Durham County has been one of the most Democratic urban counties in the South.

United States presidential election results for Durham County, North Carolina
Year	Republican		Democratic		Third party(ies)	
Year	No.	%	No.	%	No.	%
1884	1,193	42.79%	1,595	57.21%	0	0.00%
1888	1,618	45.77%	1,835	51.91%	82	2.32%
1892	1,264	35.93%	1,490	42.35%	764	21.72%
1896	1,924	43.62%	2,435	55.20%	52	1.18%
1900	2,026	45.86%	2,373	53.71%	19	0.43%
1904	1,080	40.10%	1,603	59.52%	10	0.37%
1908	1,820	49.35%	1,859	50.41%	9	0.24%
1912	124	3.52%	2,197	62.31%	1,205	34.17%
1916	1,837	42.72%	2,463	57.28%	0	0.00%
1920	3,550	43.31%	4,646	56.69%	0	0.00%
1924	3,093	37.95%	4,837	59.34%	221	2.71%
1928	8,723	66.06%	4,482	33.94%	0	0.00%
1932	2,770	25.94%	7,559	70.78%	351	3.29%
1936	2,189	14.60%	12,804	85.40%	0	0.00%
1940	2,491	14.40%	14,810	85.60%	0	0.00%
1944	3,690	22.43%	12,763	77.57%	0	0.00%
1948	4,531	25.73%	11,530	65.46%	1,552	8.81%
1952	11,301	37.42%	18,897	62.58%	0	0.00%
1956	13,226	48.87%	13,835	51.13%	0	0.00%
1960	14,322	42.60%	19,298	57.40%	0	0.00%
1964	15,264	40.02%	22,874	59.98%	0	0.00%
1968	12,705	29.68%	16,563	38.69%	13,542	31.63%
1972	25,576	61.38%	15,566	37.36%	525	1.26%
1976	18,945	45.61%	22,425	53.99%	163	0.39%
1980	19,276	40.24%	24,969	52.13%	3,656	7.63%
1984	29,185	47.39%	32,244	52.36%	155	0.25%
1988	29,928	45.43%	35,441	53.79%	514	0.78%
1992	27,581	33.36%	47,331	57.24%	7,770	9.40%
1996	27,825	34.39%	49,186	60.79%	3,899	4.82%
2000	30,150	35.64%	53,907	63.72%	547	0.65%
2004	34,614	31.57%	74,524	67.96%	513	0.47%
2008	32,353	23.63%	103,456	75.57%	1,088	0.79%
2012	33,769	23.01%	111,224	75.80%	1,742	1.19%
2016	28,350	18.16%	121,250	77.66%	6,534	4.18%
2020	32,459	18.04%	144,688	80.42%	2,767	1.54%
2024	32,853	18.16%	144,450	79.85%	3,609	1.99%

== Communities ==
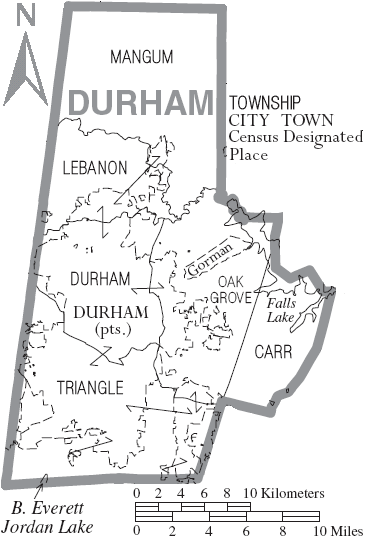
Map of Durham County with municipal and township labels

The city of Durham is the only incorporated municipality to predominantly exist within Durham County, and the only one whose urban core lies within the county, though small portions of municipalities from neighboring counties extend into Durham County, and the city of Durham also itself extends slightly into neighboring counties. All other towns and places within Durham County are unincorporated communities.

=== Cities ===
- Durham (county seat and largest community; small portions extend into Wake and Orange counties)
- Raleigh (mostly in Wake County)

=== Towns ===
- Chapel Hill (mostly in Orange County)
- Morrisville (mostly in Wake County)

=== Townships ===
- Carr
- Durham
- Lebanon
- Mangum
- Oak Grove
- Triangle

=== Census-designated places ===
- Gorman
- Rougemont (small portions extend into neighboring Person County)

=== Unincorporated communities ===
- Bahama
- Bethesda
- Genlee
- Lowe's Grove
- Nelson
- Oak Grove
- Braggtown

== Education ==
All of the county is in Durham Public Schools.

== Notable person ==
- Margaret O'Neal (1884–?), sharecropper

== See also ==
- List of counties in North Carolina
- National Register of Historic Places listings in Durham County, North Carolina
- Research Triangle Park, largest Research park in the United States
- Bull Durham, 1988 romantic comedy about the Durham Bulls
