= Flat River (North Carolina) =

Flat River Tributary to Neuse River
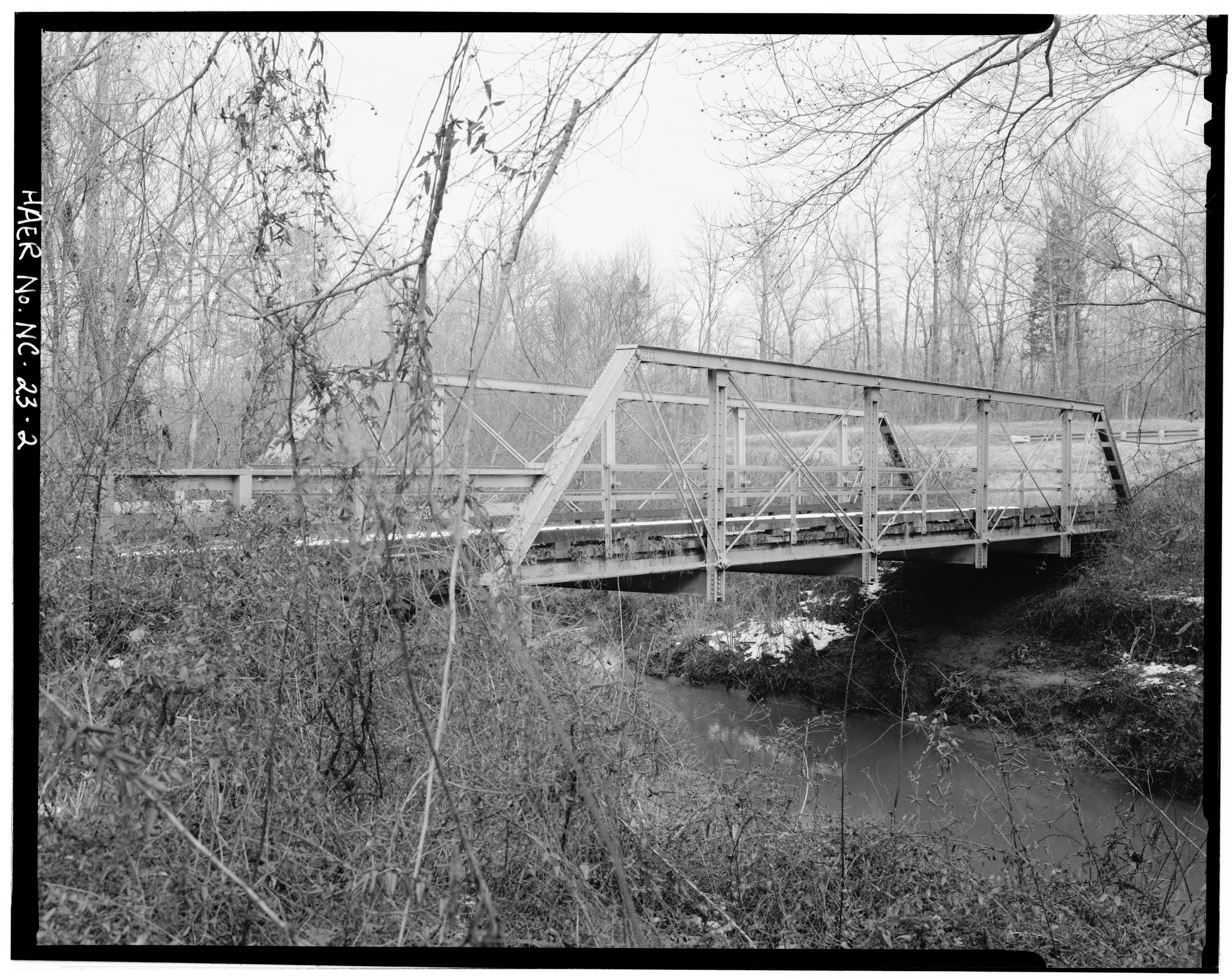
- Person County Bridge No. 35 over the Flat River

- Location of Flat River mouth

Location
- Country: United States
- State: North Carolina
- Counties: Person; Durham

Physical characteristics
- Source: confluence of North and South Flat Rivers
  - location: about 10 miles north-northwest of Bahama, North Carolina
  - coordinates: 36°15′04″N 078°55′48″W
  - elevation: 1,540 ft (470 m)
- Mouth: Eno River at Falls Lake
  - location: Durham, North Carolina
  - coordinates: 36°05′42″N 078°48′48″W
  - elevation: 252 ft (77 m)
- Length: 19.23 mi (30.95 km)
- Basin size: 175.06 square miles (453.4 km^{2})
- Discharge
  - location: Falls Lake
  - average: 184.31 cu ft/s (5.219 m^{3}/s) at mouth with Eno River at Falls Lake

Basin features
- Progression: Eno River → Neuse River → Pamlico Sound → Atlantic Ocean
- River system: Neuse River
- Tributaries
  - left: Deep Creek; Dry Creek; Rocky Creek
- Waterbodies: Lake Michie

The Flat River is a river in southern Person County, North Carolina and a portion of Durham County, North Carolina.

The river flows from Person County to combine with the Eno river to flow into the Neuse River. The river is the namesake for the township called Flat River, which has the highest census total of the 9 communities in Person County because it is mostly a combination of Hurdle Mills and Timberlake through which the river passes. North Carolina State University maintains a research forest within its watershed. Lake Michie, the principal reservoir for the city of Durham, is located on the lower reaches of the Flat River.
