= Eno River =

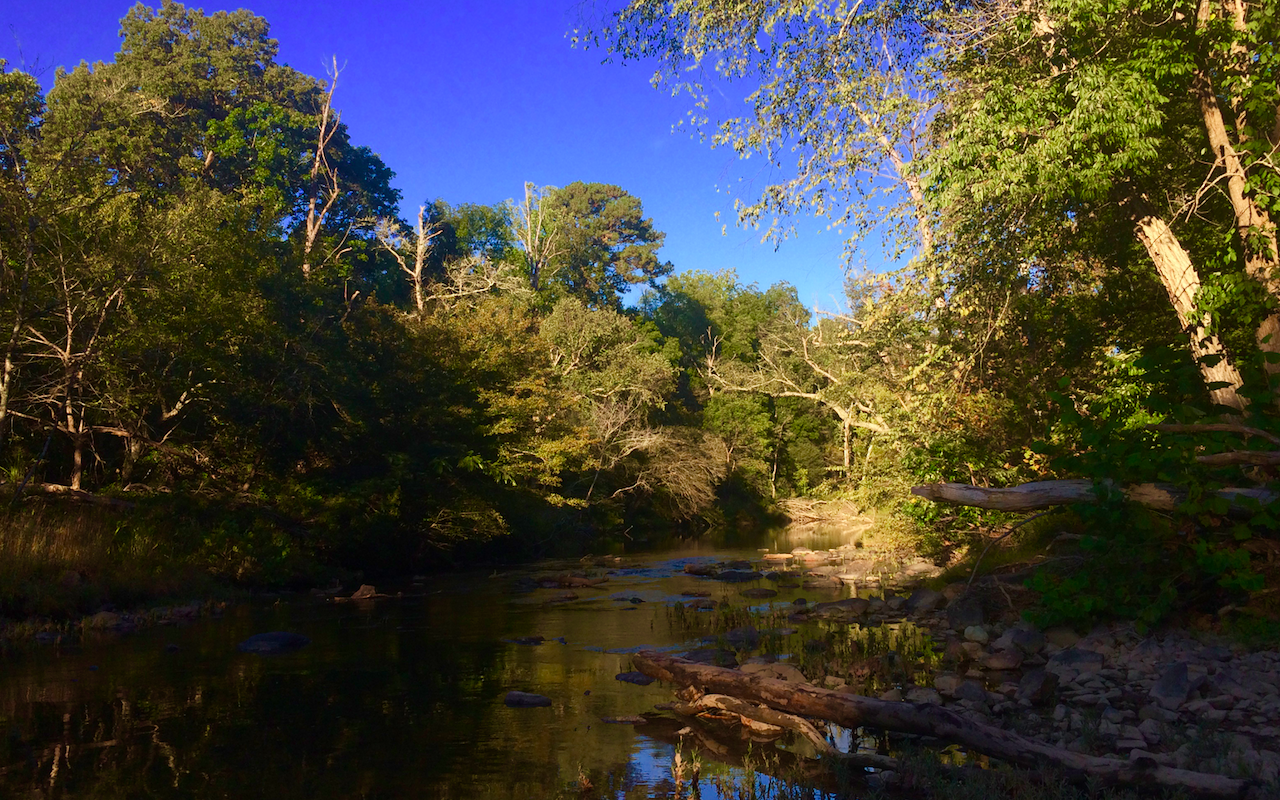
- The Eno River in Durham

- Location of Eno River mouth

Location
- Country: United States
- State: North Carolina
- Counties: Orange; Durham
- Cities: Hillsborough, Durham

Physical characteristics
- Source: Confluence of East and West Forks of Eno River
  - location: about 5 miles north of Efland, North Carolina
  - coordinates: 36°07′42″N 079°09′29″W
  - elevation: 568 ft (173 m)
- Mouth: Neuse River at Falls Lake
  - location: Durham, North Carolina, NC
  - coordinates: 36°05′42″N 078°48′48″W
  - elevation: 252 ft (77 m)
- Length: 40 mi (64 km)
- Basin size: 259.74 square miles (672.7 km^{2})
- Discharge
  - location: Neuse River at Falls Lake
  - average: 252.08 cu ft/s (7.138 m^{3}/s) at mouth with Neuse River at Falls Lake

Basin features
- Progression: Neuse River → Pamlico Sound → Atlantic Ocean
- River system: Neuse River
- Tributaries
  - left: Dry Run; Strouds Creek; Little Creek; Buckwater Creek; Crooked Creek; Little River; Flat River
  - right: McGowan Creek; Sevenmile Creek; Cates Creek; Stony Creek; Rhodes Creek
- Waterbodies: Falls Lake

The Eno River, named for the Eno Native Americans who once lived along its banks, is the initial tributary of the Neuse River in North Carolina, United States. Descendants of European immigrants settled along the Eno River in the latter 1740s and early 1750s, including many Quakers from Pennsylvania. Several years after the 1752 creation of Orange County, the Orange County Court of Common Pleas & Quarter Sessions selected a site along the Eno River near the homes of James Watson and William Reed as the county seat, originally naming it Corbin Town, or Corbinton, after Francis Corbin, agent and attorney to John, Earl Granville. The Court met at James Watson's home along the Eno River from 1754 through 1756, when the courthouse at Corbinton was completed. In 1759, officials changed the county seat's name from Corbinton to Childsburg, after another of Earl Granville's agents, Thomas Child. Finally, in 1766, officials changed the name to Hillsborough.

The Eno rises in Orange County. The river's watershed occupies most of Orange and Durham counties. The Eno converges with the Flat and Little Rivers to form the Neuse at Falls Lake, which straddles Durham and Wake counties.

The Eno is notable for its beauty and water quality, which has been preserved through aggressive citizen efforts. Though barely more than forty miles from its source to its convergence at the Neuse, the Eno features significant stretches of natural preservation. Through the combined efforts of the North Carolina State Parks System, local government, and private non-profit preservation groups, over 5,600 acres (23 km^{2}) of land have been protected in the Eno Basin, including Occoneechee Mountain State Natural Area, Eno River State Park, West Point on the Eno (a Durham City Park), and Penny's Bend State Nature Preserve (managed by the North Carolina Botanical Garden). The river is paralleled in the town of Hillsborough by several miles of the paved Riverwalk Trail, a segment of the North Carolina Mountains-to-Sea Trail.

Permitted recreational activities include swimming, hiking, fishing, canoeing, kayaking, and backcountry camping. Individual and group campsites are available.

Photographer Holden Richards captured the natural beauty of the Eno River in his 2021 book Riverwalk: A Decade Along the Eno.

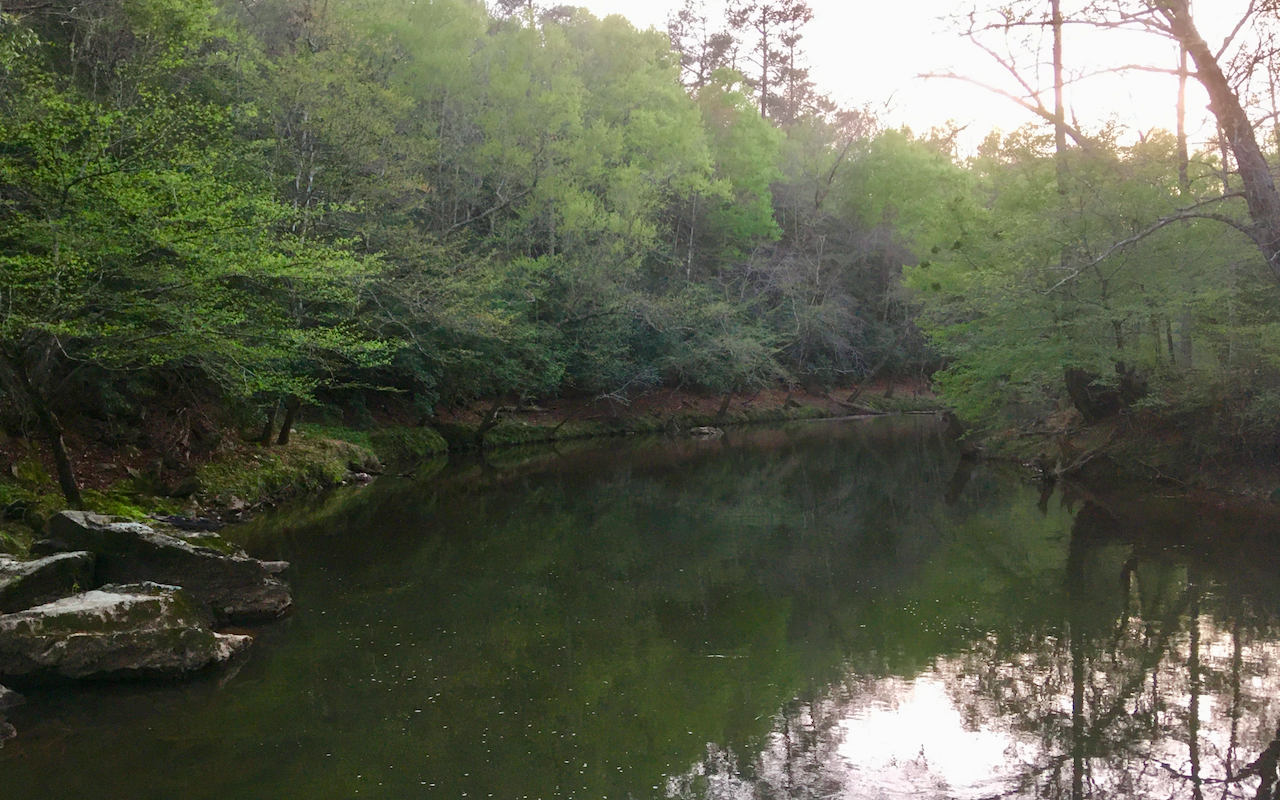
Eno River in Northwestern Durham

== See also ==
- List of North Carolina rivers
- Eno River State Park
- West Point on the Eno
