= Carbon dioxide enrichment =

Carbon dioxide enrichment can mean:

- CO_{2} fertilization effect
- Free-air concentration enrichment (FACE)
- For use in greenhouses see Greenhouse#Carbon dioxide enrichment
