= Patterson Plantation =

Plantation in Orange County, North Carolina

Coordinates: 35.9754°N 79.0052°W

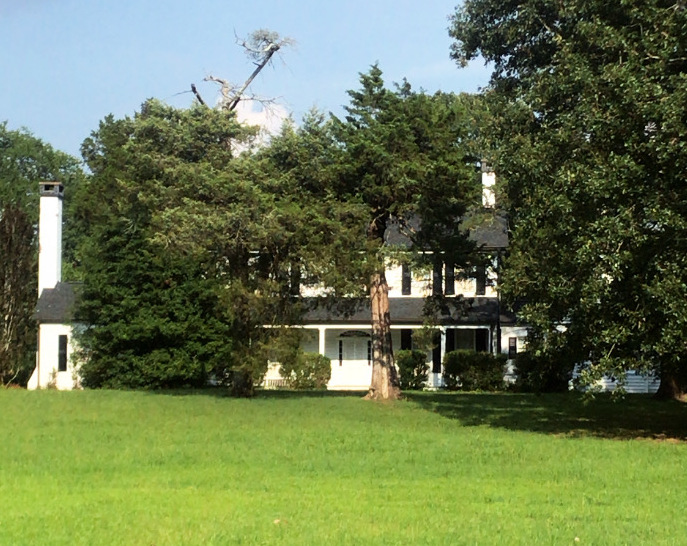
- Patterson Plantation in 2021
- Interactive map of the Patterson Plantation area

General information
- Status: active
- Type: private residence
- Architectural style: Federal architecture
- Location: 630 Erwin Road; Durham, North Carolina, U.S.
- Completed: 1834

The Patterson Plantation, also known as Holly Rock Farm, is a historic Federal style plantation house located on the edge of Durham in Orange County, North Carolina. The home was once the center of a 2,200-acre plantation dating back to the 18th-century.

== History ==
The Patterson Plantation was first listed in a 1770 Collet Map as "I. Paterson", at the time it was owned by a planter named John Patterson, who built a cabin on the site. The family also operated a mill, known as Patterson's Mill, along New Hope Creek in what is now Duke Forest. The land later passed to Patterson's son, John Tapley Patterson. Upon his death, it passed to his son, Mann Patterson. Construction on the large Federal-style house began in 1834, shortly before the death of Patterson. His second wife Mary Cabe Patterson, who had inherited the 2,200-acre plantation, later completed the building. It was built at the intersection of Erwin and Whitfield Roads, less than a mile from Mt. Moriah Baptist Church. The Patterson's two sons, Mann and Robert, also lived at the farm. Two house slaves, named Matthew and Phebe, were listed as part of the household in 1870.

The plantation also includes a family cemetery, located further down Erwin Road, which includes 27 marked graves and 5 unmarked graves.

In the 1950s, the plantation was under the ownership of Charlie and Josie Henderson Humphries, who had inherited it from family members. The Humphries later moved to Hope Valley Country Club, and members of the Henderson family came to live on the property, building a house across the street in the 1980s.

The plantation was later purchased by David Dickson and renamed Holly Rock Farm.
