= White Oak Creek (New Hope River tributary) =

Stream in North Carolina, USA

White Oak Creek Tributary to New Hope River
- Location of White Oak Creek mouth White Oak Creek (New Hope River tributary) (the United States)

Location
- Country: United States
- State: North Carolina
- County: Chatham; Wake
- City: Apex
- Town: Cary

Physical characteristics
- Source: Beaver Creek and Crabtree Creek divide
  - location: pond on the west side of Apex, North Carolina
  - coordinates: 35°45′23″N 079°50′53″W
  - elevation: 465 ft (142 m)
- Mouth: New Hope River
  - location: B. Everett Jordan Lake
  - coordinates: 35°44′36″N 079°01′21″W
  - elevation: 216 ft (66 m)
- Length: 12.83 mi (20.65 km)
- Basin size: 27.75 square miles (71.9 km^{2})
- Discharge
  - location: New Hope River (B. Everett Jordan Lake)
  - average: 30.68 cu ft/s (0.869 m^{3}/s) at mouth with New Hope River

Basin features
- Progression: generally west
- River system: Haw River
- Tributaries
  - left: Jack Branch; Clark Branch
  - right: Bachelor Branch; Rocky Ford Branch; Mill Branch
- Waterbodies: B. Everett Jordan Lake
- Bridges: NC 55, I-540, Wimberly Road, NC 751, Farrington Road

White Oak Creek is a 12.83 mi (20.65 km) long 3rd order tributary to the New Hope River in North Carolina. White Oak Creek joins the New Hope River within the B. Everett Jordan Lake Reservoir.

== Variant names ==
According to the Geographic Names Information System, it has also been known historically as:

- Whiteoak Creek

== Course ==
White Oak Creek rises in a pond on the Beaver Creek and Crabtree Creek divide on the west side of Apex, North Carolina. White Oak Creek then flows westerly to meet New Hope River in the B. Everett Jordan Lake Reservoir in Chatham County.

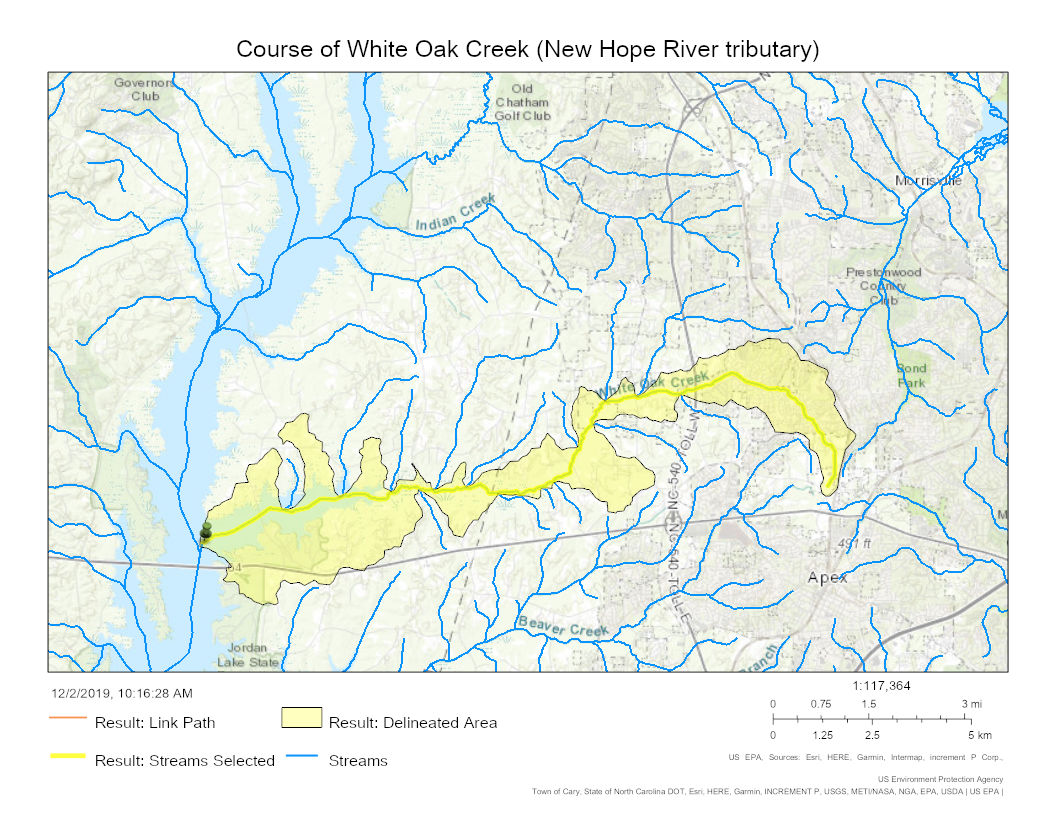
Course of White Oak Creek (New Hope River tributary)

== Watershed ==
White Oak Creek drains 27.75 square miles (71.9 km^{2}) of area, receives about 46.9 in/year of precipitation, has a topographic wetness index of 461.07, and has an average water temperature of 15.30 °C. The watershed is 52% forested.

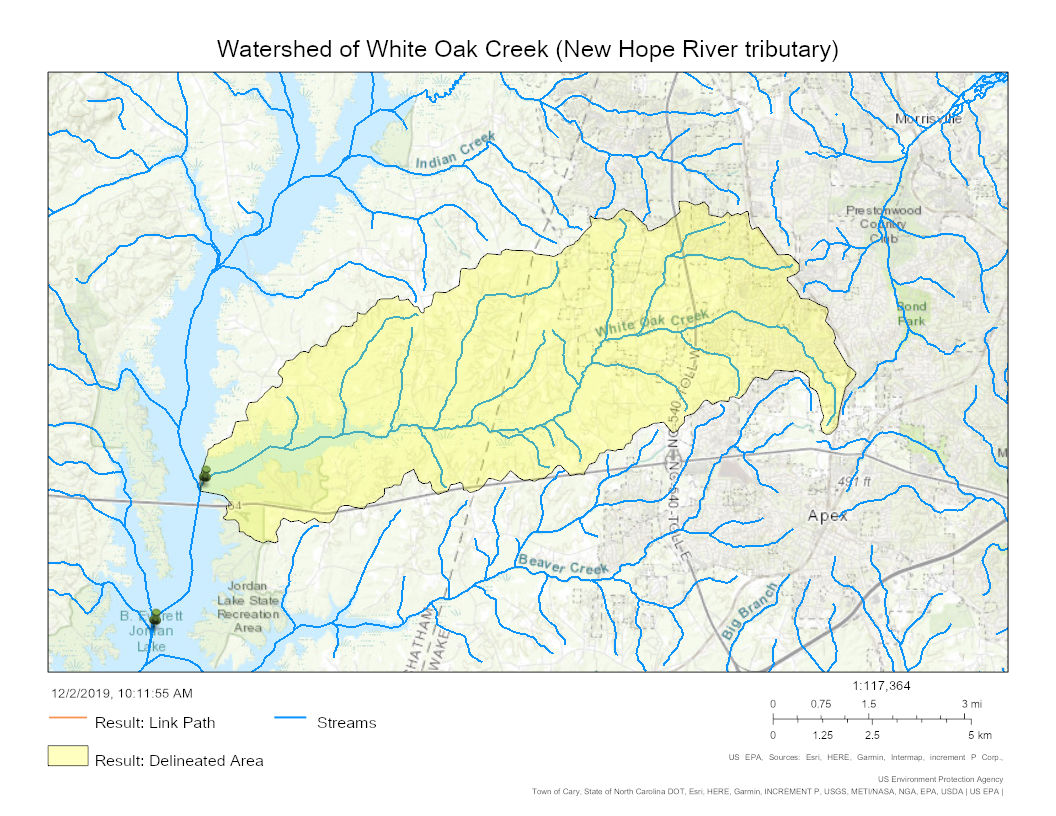
Watershed of White Oak Creek (New Hope River tributary)
