= Free Ocean CO2 Enrichment =

Free Ocean CO_{2} Enrichment (FOCE) is a technology facilitating studies of the consequences of ocean acidification for marine organisms and communities by enabling the precise control of CO_{2} enrichment within in-situ, partially open, experimental enclosures. Current FOCE systems control experimental CO_{2} perturbations by real-time monitoring of differences in seawater pH between treatment (i.e. high-CO_{2}) and control (i.e. ambient) seawater within experimental enclosures.

== Overview ==
In situ, controlled perturbation experiments, often conducted over weeks to months, can provide inference concerning the response of natural communities to ocean acidification that is difficult or impossible to derive from laboratory experiments. Studies conducted in situ can include the effects of potentially important factors such as natural variation in planktonic food resources, larval abundance, changes in predators or competitors, as well as oceanographic conditions (e.g. changes in upwelling intensity). Drawing on the experience of Free Air CO_{2} Enrichment (FACE) experiments used to investigate the response of terrestrial plant communities to rising atmospheric CO_{2} levels, the scientific community has developed an analogous approach, Free Ocean CO_{2} Enrichment (FOCE) experiments, for studying marine communities, and to complement a range of experimental methods and technologies for ocean acidification studies research. FOCE was first proposed and implemented by researchers at the Monterey Bay Aquarium Research Institute (MBARI).

== Purpose ==
As studies of the consequences of ocean acidification for marine organisms and ecosystems expanded rapidly over the past decade, the methods employed to evaluate the effects of expected future changes in ocean chemistry have become more sophisticated. Initial studies frequently involved measurements of the survival or physiological response of individuals of marine species to large changes in pCO2 or pH, while held in small containers under laboratory conditions. This approach increased the level of understanding of the effects of these environmental changes on individual species but provided little information concerning the response of natural assemblages of interacting species, in which the direct impacts of ocean acidification as well as their cascading indirect consequences (e.g. changes in the intensity of interaction strengths among predators or competitors) may be evident. Pelagic mesocosm experiments that examined the response of natural plankton communities to controlled pH perturbations helped move methods of ocean acidification research toward more comprehensive studies of whole communities and embedded processes under mostly natural conditions. The FOCE approach represents an analogous advance for benthic assemblages, by allowing examination of the direct effects of acidification on particular species, but also potential changes in interactions among species. Moreover, FOCE methods provide precise control of pH, while allowing many other parameters to vary naturally. Like mesocosm studies, FOCE methods exploit the advantages of studying a natural community under mostly natural ranges of environmental variability.

== Methods ==
The key elements of any FOCE experimental units are perspex, partially open, chambers, a CO_{2} mixing system, sensors to continuously monitor ambient and chamber pH, and a control loop to regulate the addition of gases or liquids to each experimental chamber.

The carbonate chemistry of seawater can be manipulated using different approaches to mimic future conditions. It is possible to directly inject gases (pure CO_{2} or CO_{2}-enriched air) but this is more difficult than delivering water to achieve precise pH control. Current FOCE systems lower pH using metered addition of CO_{2}-enriched seawater into the experimental chambers. pH is controlled as a constant pH offset relative to ambient values, maintaining natural variability, or as a constant value.

Other approaches have been used to manipulate the seawater carbonate chemistry in the field. In pelagic mesocosm experiments, the carbonate chemistry is generally altered at the beginning of the experiment and subsequently drifts as a function of biological processes and air-sea gas transfer. CO_{2} bubbling in open water has also been used. This approach does not enable precise control of the carbonate chemistry because it does not include a device to ensure full equilibration of added CO_{2} in seawater and its precise control. There are no experimental chambers to regulate water flow, and thus allows for natural near-bottom flow conditions, but it generates highly variable pH under variable current speed or direction. This approach is therefore more similar to natural CO_{2} vents than to FOCE systems. This approach can be useful when organisms can not be enclosed in chambers and when they inhabit environments such as estuaries where pCO2 levels are naturally hyper-variable. The approach has inherent limitations but may allow greater replication, at lower cost.

Current users of FOCE systems have organized to release guidelines and best practices information for future users. Furthermore, the Monterey Bay Aquarium Research Institute will release an open source package to transfer FOCE technology to interested researchers (xFOCE). This package will comprise all engineering information required to develop cost effective FOCE systems.

Future development of FOCE systems will include the study of the combined effects of ocean acidification and other environmental factors such as temperature or the concentration of dissolved oxygen.

== Current FOCE Projects ==
=== Deep FOCE (dpFOCE) ===
A FOCE system for studies of deep-sea benthic communities (designated dp-FOCE) was developed by Monterey Bay Aquarium Research Institute. The dpFOCE project, deployed at a depth of 900 m, was attached to the MARS cabled seafloor observatory in Monterey Bay, central California. The system used a flume concept for maintaining greater control over the experimental volume while still maintaining access to natural seafloor sediments and suspended particulate material. Time-delay wings attached to either end of the dpFOCE chamber allow for tidally driven changes in near-bottom currents, and provide sufficient time for full hydration of the injected CO_{2} enriched seawater before entering into the experiment chamber. Fans are integrated into the dpFOCE design to control flow rates through the experimental chamber and to simulate typical local-scale flow conditions. Multiple sensors (pH, CTD, ADV, and ADCP) used in conjunction with the fans and the enriched seawater injection system allow the control loop software to achieve the desired pH offset. dpFOCE connects to shore via the MARS cabled observatory, which provides power and data bandwidth. Enriched CO_{2} seawater is produced from liquid CO_{2} held in a small container near the dpFOCE chamber; seawater flowing slowly over the top of the liquid CO_{2} dissolves some of the liquid CO_{2} producing a CO_{2}-rich dissolution plume used for injection into the dpFOCE chamber. The dpFOCE system operated over 17 months and verified the effectiveness of the design hardware and software.

=== Coral Prototype FOCE (cpFOCE) ===
The cpFOCE uses replicate experimental flumes to enclose sections of a coral reef and dose them with CO_{2}-enriched seawater using peristaltic pumps with computer controlled feedback loop to maintain a specified pH offset from ambient conditions. A cpFOCE chamber has forward and rear flow conditioners on either end to accommodate bidirectional ocean currents. The openings are placed parallel to the dominant axis of tidal currents over the reef flat, and the chamber is anchored with sand stakes. The flow conditioners are attached to maximize turbulence and provide passive mixing of the CO_{2} enriched seawater. Four of the tubes in the flow conditioners furthest from the chamber have small holes along their length through which low pH water is pumped to dispense it evenly along the entire width and height of the conditioner. The flow conditioners are also painted white to minimize heating and algal growth. The cpFOCE system was deployed at Heron Island (Great Barrier Reef) to investigate the response of coral communities to ocean acidification.

=== European FOCE (eFOCE) ===
The European FOCE (eFOCE) comprises two open-top chambers (control and experimental) as well as a surface buoy housing the electronics and pumps to produce CO_{2}-enriched water. The system is powered by solar and wind energy. Data packets are wirelessly sent to the nearby laboratory and can be monitored on the internet. The eFOCE system is currently deployed in the bay of Villefranche-sur-mer (France) at about 12 m depth and 300 m offshore. The eFOCE project has been developed to investigate the long-term effects of acidification on benthic marine communities of the North West Mediterranean Sea, especially Posidonia seagrass beds. Over a 3-year period, the aim of the project is to develop relatively long (> 6 month) experiments.

=== Shallow Water FOCE (swFOCE) ===
In collaboration with Hopkins Marine Station and the Center for Ocean Solutions, Monterey Bay Aquarium Research Institute is developing a swFOCE system to examine the effects of ocean acidification on shallow subtidal communities in central California. swFOCE will use a shore side station for the control system and production of CO_{2} enriched seawater, and will also use and will use an existing cabled observational and research platform to connect the swFOCE node. Two swFOCE chambers will be installed initially at a depth of 15 m, approximately 250 m offshore. The nearby node of the cabled observatorynode, has instruments to monitor local currents, temperature, pH, and O2 in real-time, as a cabled observatory platform for scientific research.

=== Antarctic FOCE (AntFOCE) ===
The first polar FOCE (antFOCE) experiment was awarded funding in November 2012, followed by design and concept studies initiated in 2013. Installation and initial science experiments are planned for 2014. antFOCE is a collaborative effort between the University of Tasmania, Australian Antarctic Division, Antarctic Climate & Ecosystems Cooperative Research Centre, Monterey Bay Aquarium Research Institute and specialist ocean acidification policy advisors from the International Ocean Acidification Reference Users Group (IOA-RUG). The IOA-RUG will take the lead in communicating the outcomes of the FOCE experiment to global climate and ocean policy related organizations.
