= New Hope River (Haw River tributary) =

Stream in North Carolina, USA

New Hope River Tributary to Haw River
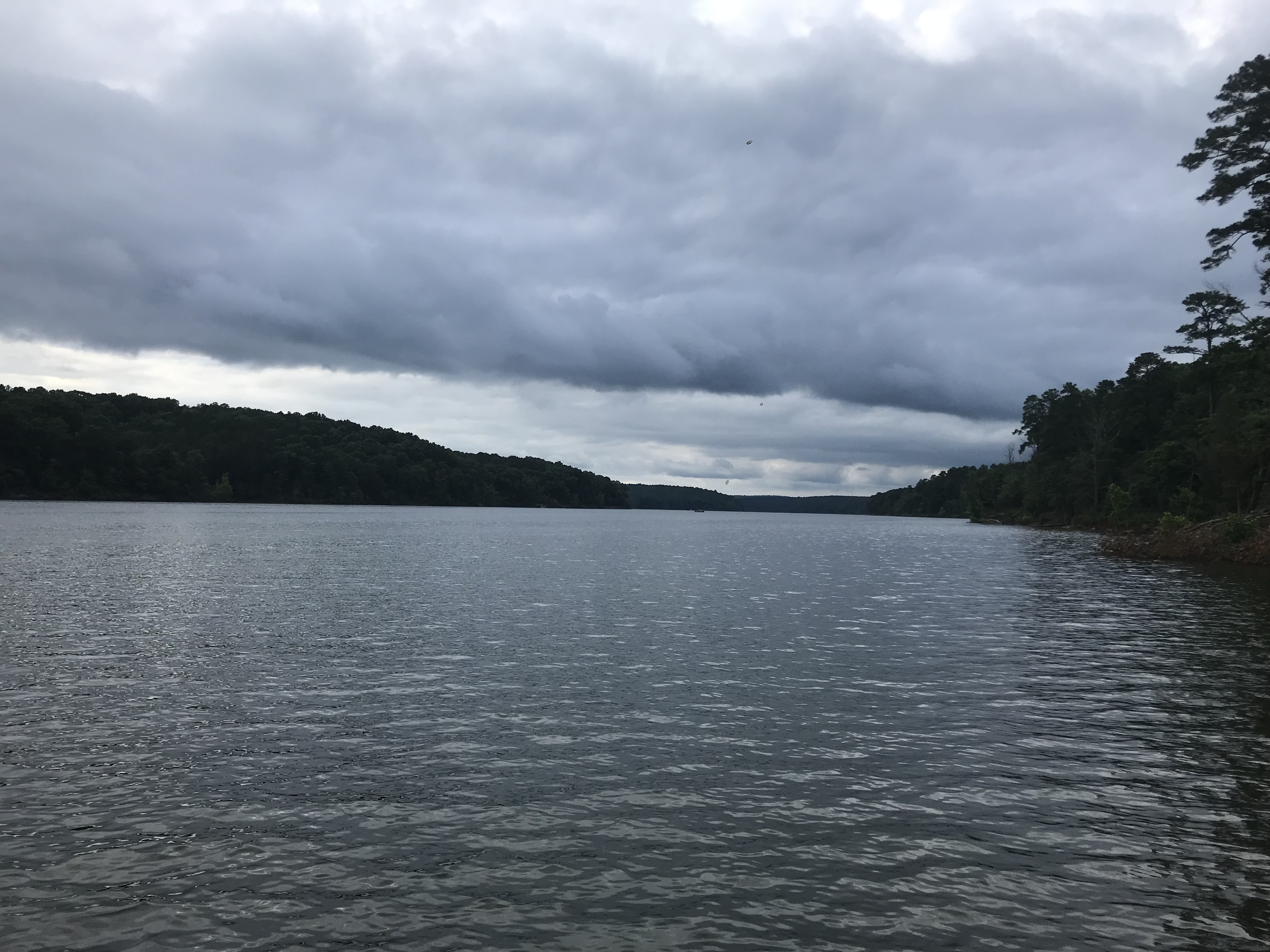
- The New Hope River flooded into Jordan Lake, near where it combines with the Haw River.

- Location of New Hope River mouth New Hope River (Haw River tributary) (the United States)

Location
- Country: United States
- State: North Carolina
- County: Chatham

Physical characteristics
- Source: confluence of New Hope Creek and Morgan Creek
  - location: B. Everett Jordan Lake
  - coordinates: 35°48′37″N 078°59′48″W
  - elevation: 216 ft (66 m)
- Mouth: Haw River
  - location: B. Everett Jordan Lake
  - coordinates: 35°39′28″N 079°04′14″W
  - elevation: 216 ft (66 m)
- Length: 12.19 mi (19.62 km)
- Basin size: 342.98 square miles (888.3 km^{2})
- Discharge
  - location: Haw River
  - average: 377.12 cu ft/s (10.679 m^{3}/s) at mouth with Haw River

Basin features
- Progression: Haw River → Cape Fear River → Atlantic Ocean
- River system: Haw River
- Tributaries
  - left: New Hope Creek; Folkner Branch; White Oak Creek; Beaver Creek
  - right: Morgan Creek; Bush Creek; Parkers Creek
- Bridges: Farrington Road, US 64

New Hope River is a 12.19-mile-long (19.62 km) fifth-order tributary to the Haw River in Chatham County, North Carolina. This river is now entirely flooded as part of B. Everett Jordan Lake. All of the tributaries to the river are present as arms of the lake. New Hope River contributes 21.8% of the total water discharge for the Haw River.

== Variant names ==
According to the Geographic Names Information System, it has also been known historically as:

- New Hope Creek
- New River
- New-hope Creek
- Newhope Creek

== Course ==
New Hope River is formed at the confluence of New Hope Creek and Morgan Creek in the northern part of B. Everett Jordan Lake. When it was a river it flowed south-southwest to the Haw River.

== Watershed ==
New Hope River drains 342.98 square miles (888.3 km^{2}) of area, receives about 47.2 in/year of precipitation, and has a topographic wetness index of 451.04 and is about 49% forested.

== See also ==
- Parkers Creek (New Hope River tributary)
