= Bush Creek (New Hope River tributary) =

Stream in North Carolina, USA

Bush Creek Tributary to New Hope River
- Location of Bush Creek mouth Bush Creek (New Hope River tributary) (the United States)

Location
- Country: United States
- State: North Carolina
- County: Chatham

Physical characteristics
- Source: Pokeberry Creek divide
  - location: Farrington Village, North Carolina
  - coordinates: 35°47′48″N 079°05′21″W
  - elevation: 430 ft (130 m)
- Mouth: New Hope River
  - location: B. Everett Jordan Lake
  - coordinates: 35°47′33″N 079°00′53″W
  - elevation: 216 ft (66 m)
- Length: 5.76 mi (9.27 km)
- Basin size: 12.09 square miles (31.3 km^{2})
- Discharge
  - location: New Hope River (B. Everett Jordan Lake)
  - average: 14.56 cu ft/s (0.412 m^{3}/s) at mouth with New Hope River

Basin features
- Progression: northeast then southeast
- River system: Haw River
- Tributaries
  - left: Herndon Creek; Overcup Creek
- Waterbodies: B. Everett Jordan Lake
- Bridges: Millcroft Road, Langdon Court, Big Woods Road

Bush Creek is a 5.76 mi (9.27 km) long 3rd order tributary to the New Hope River in North Carolina. Bush Creek joins the New Hope River within the B. Everett Jordan Lake Reservoir.

== Course and watershed ==
Bush Creek rises on the Pokeberry Creek divide in Farrington Village, North Carolina. Bush Creek then flows northeast and then turns southeast to meet New Hope River in the B. Everett Jordan Lake Reservoir in Chatham County.

Bush Creek drains 12.09 square miles (31.3 km^{2}) of area, receives about 47.3 in/year of precipitation, has a topographic wetness index of 405.13, and has an average water temperature of 15.07 °C. The watershed is 52% forested.

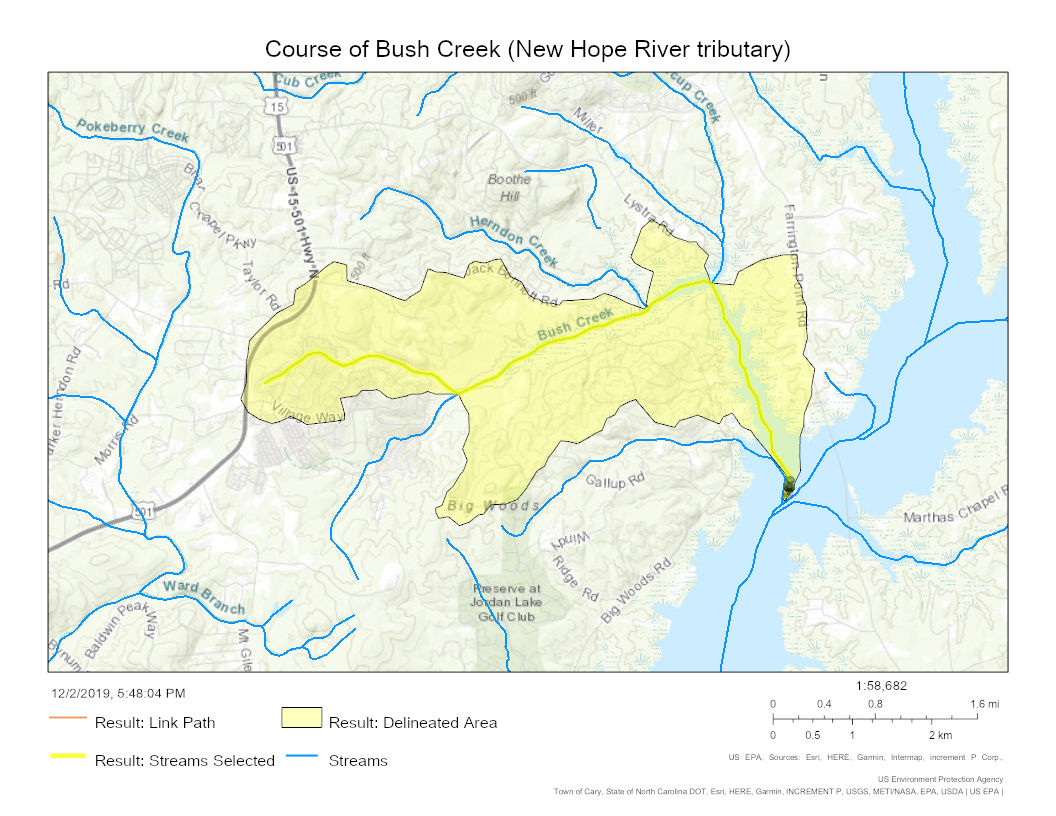
Course of Bush Creek

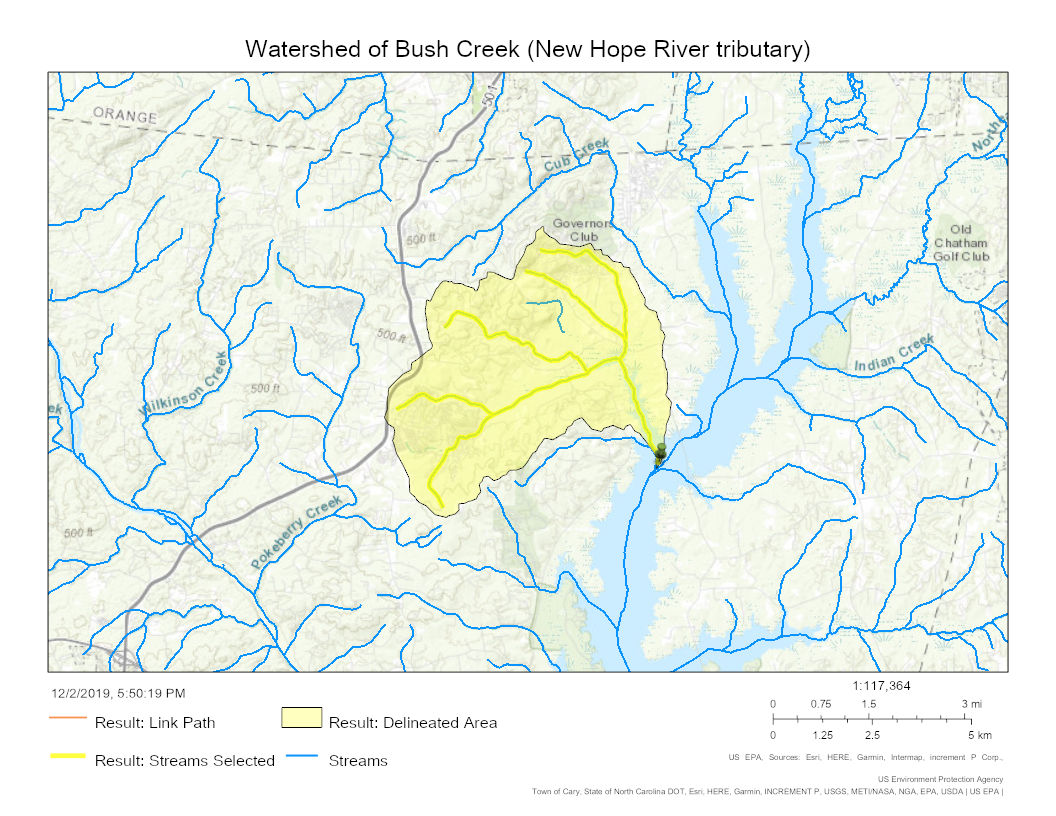
Watershed of Bush Creek
