= Folkner Branch (New Hope River tributary) =

Stream in North Carolina, USA

Folkner Branch Tributary to New Hope River
- Location of Folkner Branch mouth Folkner Branch (New Hope River tributary) (the United States)

Location
- Country: United States
- State: North Carolina
- County: Chatham

Physical characteristics
- Source: Rocky Ford and Lick Branch divide
  - location: about 3 miles west of Green Level, North Carolina
  - coordinates: 35°47′02″N 079°57′50″W
  - elevation: 315 ft (96 m)
- Mouth: New Hope River
  - location: B. Everett Jordan Lake
  - coordinates: 35°47′33″N 079°00′53″W
  - elevation: 216 ft (66 m)
- Length: 3.89 mi (6.26 km)
- Basin size: 3.15 square miles (8.2 km^{2})
- Discharge
  - location: New Hope River (B. Everett Jordan Lake)
  - average: 3.79 cu ft/s (0.107 m^{3}/s) at mouth with New Hope River

Basin features
- Progression: generally west
- River system: Haw River
- Tributaries
  - left: unnamed tributaries
  - right: unnamed tributaries
- Waterbodies: B. Everett Jordan Lake
- Bridges: Farrington Road

Folkner Branch is a 3.89 mi (6.26 km) long 1st order tributary to the New Hope River in North Carolina. Folkner Branch joins the New Hope River within the B. Everett Jordan Lake Reservoir.

== Course ==
Folkner Branch rises in a pond on the Rocky Ford and Lick Branch divide about 3 miles west of Green Level, North Carolina. Folkner Branch then flows westerly to meet New Hope River in the B. Everett Jordan Lake Reservoir in Chatham County.

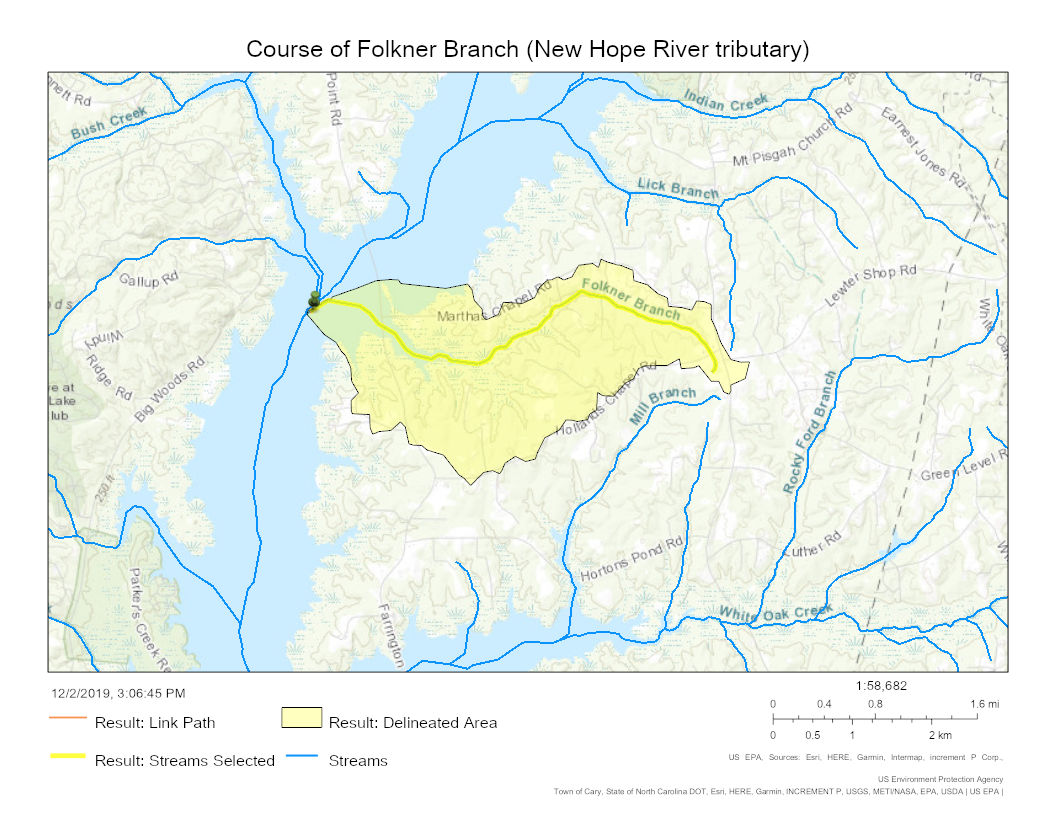
Course and Watershed of Folkner Branch (New Hope River tributary)

== Watershed ==
Folkner Branch drains 3.15 square miles (8.2 km^{2}) of area, receives about 47.0 in/year of precipitation, has a topographic wetness index of 508.03, and has an average water temperature of 15.35 °C. The watershed is 66% forested.
