= Parkers Creek (New Hope River tributary) =

Stream in North Carolina, USA

Parkers Creek Tributary to New Hope River
- Location of Parkers Creek mouth Parkers Creek (New Hope River tributary) (the United States)

Location
- Country: United States
- State: North Carolina
- County: Chatham

Physical characteristics
- Source: Haw River divide
  - location: about 0.2 miles southeast of Red Hill
  - coordinates: 35°45′47″N 079°05′52″W
  - elevation: 530 ft (160 m)
- Mouth: New Hope River
  - location: B. Everett Jordan Lake
  - coordinates: 35°42′43″N 079°02′35″W
  - elevation: 216 ft (66 m)
- Length: 6.21 mi (9.99 km)
- Basin size: 6.24 square miles (16.2 km^{2})
- Discharge
  - location: New Hope River (B. Everett Jordan Lake)
  - average: 7.54 cu ft/s (0.214 m^{3}/s) at mouth with New Hope River

Basin features
- Progression: southeast and south
- River system: Haw River
- Tributaries
  - left: unnamed tributaries
  - right: Windfall Branch
- Waterbodies: B. Everett Jordan Lake
- Bridges: Mt. Gilead Church Road, Seaforth Road, US 64

Parkers Creek is a 6.21 mi (9.99 km) long 2nd order tributary to the New Hope River in North Carolina. Parkers Creek joins the New Hope River within the B. Everett Jordan Lake Reservoir.

== Course ==
Parkers Creek rises on the Haw River divide about 0.2 miles southeast of Red Hill. Parkers Creek then flows southeast and south to meet New Hope River in the B. Everett Jordan Lake Reservoir in Chatham County.

== Watershed ==
Parkers Creek drains 6.24 square miles (16.2 km^{2}) of area, receives about 47.2 in/year of precipitation, has a topographic wetness index of 516.42, and has an average water temperature of 15.21 °C. The watershed is 71% forested.

== Additional images ==
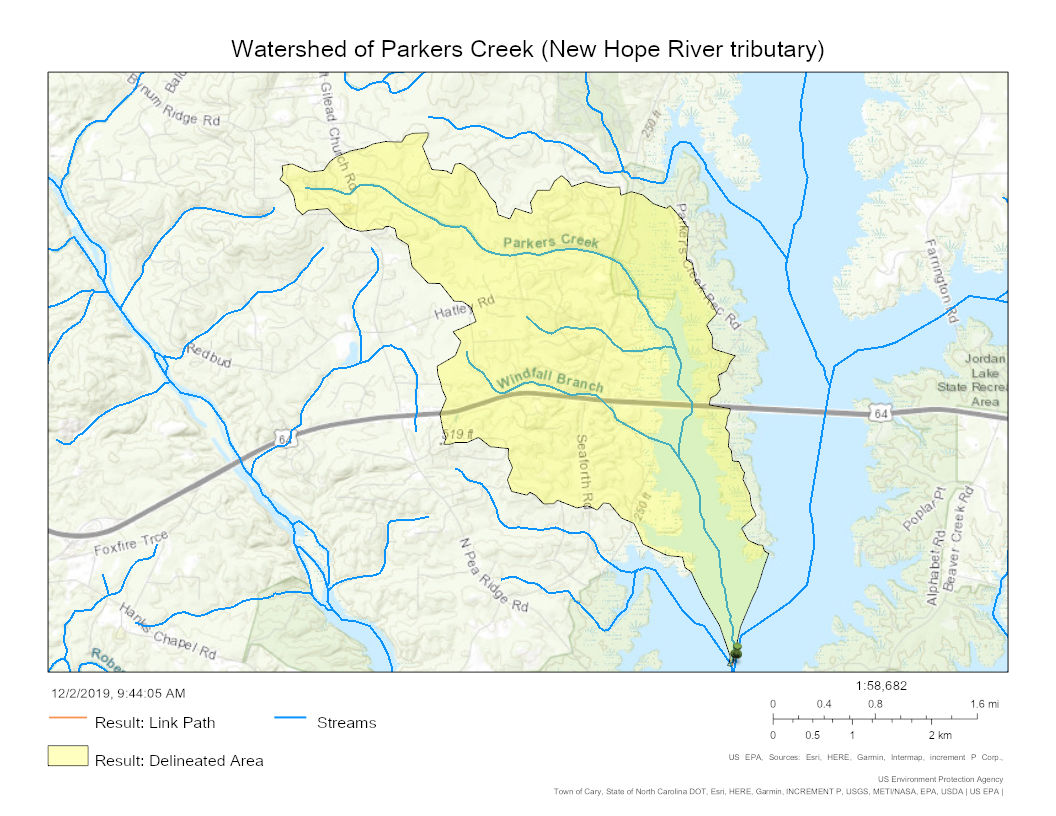
Watershed of Parkers Creek (New Hope River tributary)

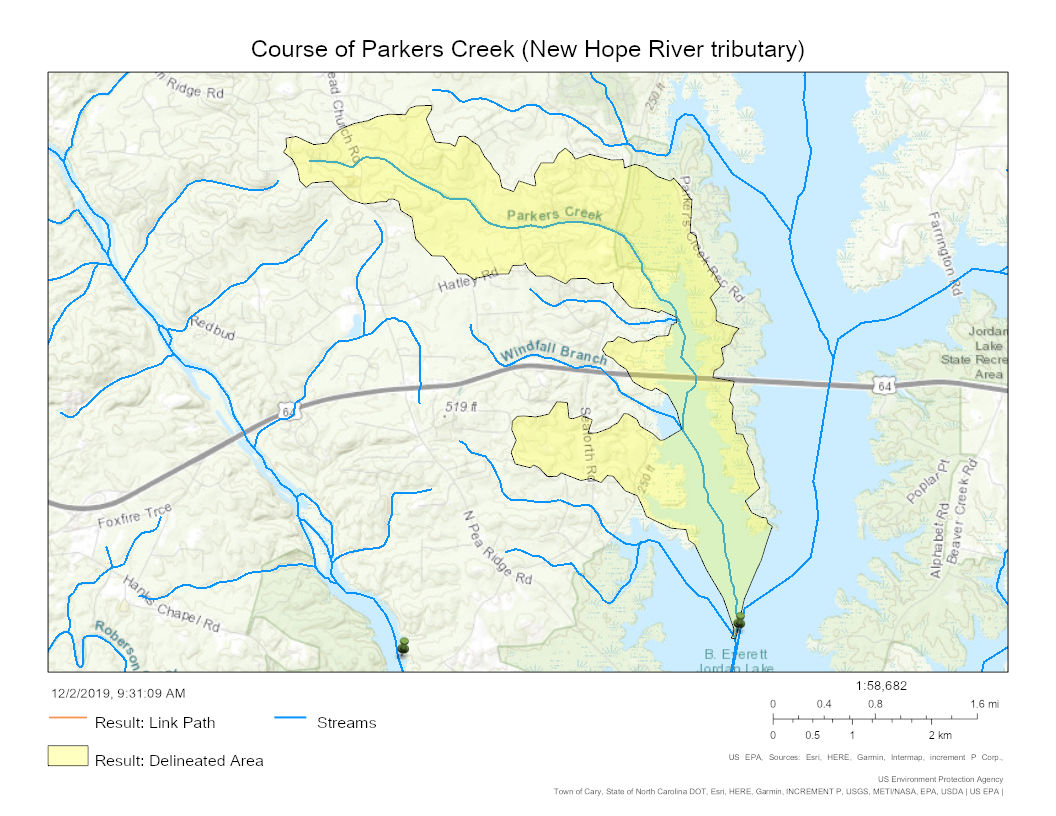
Course of Parkers Creek (New Hope River tributary)
