= New Hope Valley =

Coordinates: 35.75°N 79.03°W

The New Hope Valley is a valley located in the heart of The Triangle (North Carolina). The valley has been the site of a broad range of cultures for more than 10,000 years. Archaeologists have explored the remains of 450 prehistoric and historic sites in the area and have uncovered many Native American artifacts.

The area was first explored by Europeans in 1701, and by 1810 a network of farms dotted the valley linked to Pittsboro, North Carolina, the county seat. The land was settled by Scottish Highlanders in the 1740s, and it saw action in both the Revolutionary and Civil wars. It became a logging center in the early 1900s as railroads such as the New Hope Valley Railway pushed through the area.

Following a disastrous hurricane which struck the Cape Fear River Basin in 1945, Congress directed the U.S. Army Corps of Engineers to undertake a comprehensive study of water resource needs in the area. The project, then known as New Hope Lake, was authorized in 1963, and construction began in 1967. In 1973, the name of the project was changed to B. Everett Jordan Lake in honor of the former senator from North Carolina.
