= Beaver Creek (New Hope River tributary) =

Stream in North Carolina, USA

Beaver Creek Tributary to New Hope River
- Location of Beaver Creek mouth Beaver Creek (New Hope River tributary) (the United States)

Location
- Country: United States
- State: North Carolina
- County: Chatham; Wake
- City: Apex

Physical characteristics
- Source: Crabtree Creek divide
  - location: pond in Apex, North Carolina
  - coordinates: 35°45′14″N 078°51′10″W
  - elevation: 485 ft (148 m)
- Mouth: New Hope River
  - location: B. Everett Jordan Lake
  - coordinates: 35°42′00″N 079°02′31″W
  - elevation: 216 ft (66 m)
- Length: 12.64 mi (20.34 km)
- Basin size: 41.24 square miles (106.8 km^{2})
- Discharge
  - location: New Hope River (B. Everett Jordan Lake)
  - average: 45.24 cu ft/s (1.281 m^{3}/s) at mouth with New Hope River

Basin features
- Progression: west
- River system: Haw River
- Tributaries
  - left: Little Beaver Creek; Weaver Creek
  - right: Reedy Branch
- Waterbodies: B. Everett Jordan Lake
- Bridges: NC 55, Green Level Church Road, Olive Chapel Road, I-540, Kelly Road, Apex Barbecue Road, Richardson Road, New Hill-Olive Chapel Road, Beaver Creek Road

Beaver Creek is a 12.64 mi (20.34 km) long 4th order tributary to the New Hope River in North Carolina. Beaver Creek joins the New Hope River within the B. Everett Jordan Lake Reservoir.

== Course ==
Beaver Creek rises in a pond on the Crabtree Creek divide in Apex in Wake County, North Carolina. Beaver Creek then flows west to meet New Hope River in the B. Everett Jordan Lake Reservoir in Chatham County.

Course of Beaver Creek (New Hope River tributary)

== Watershed ==
Beaver Creek drains 41.24 square miles (106.8 km^{2}) of area, receives about 47.1 in/year of precipitation, has a topographic wetness index of 468.29, and had an average water temperature of 15.31 °C. The watershed is 19% developed, 1.4% agricultural, 52% forested, and 6.2% open water.

Beaver Creek (New Hope River tributary) watershed
