= CO2 fertilization effect =

Fertilization from increased levels of atmospheric carbon dioxide

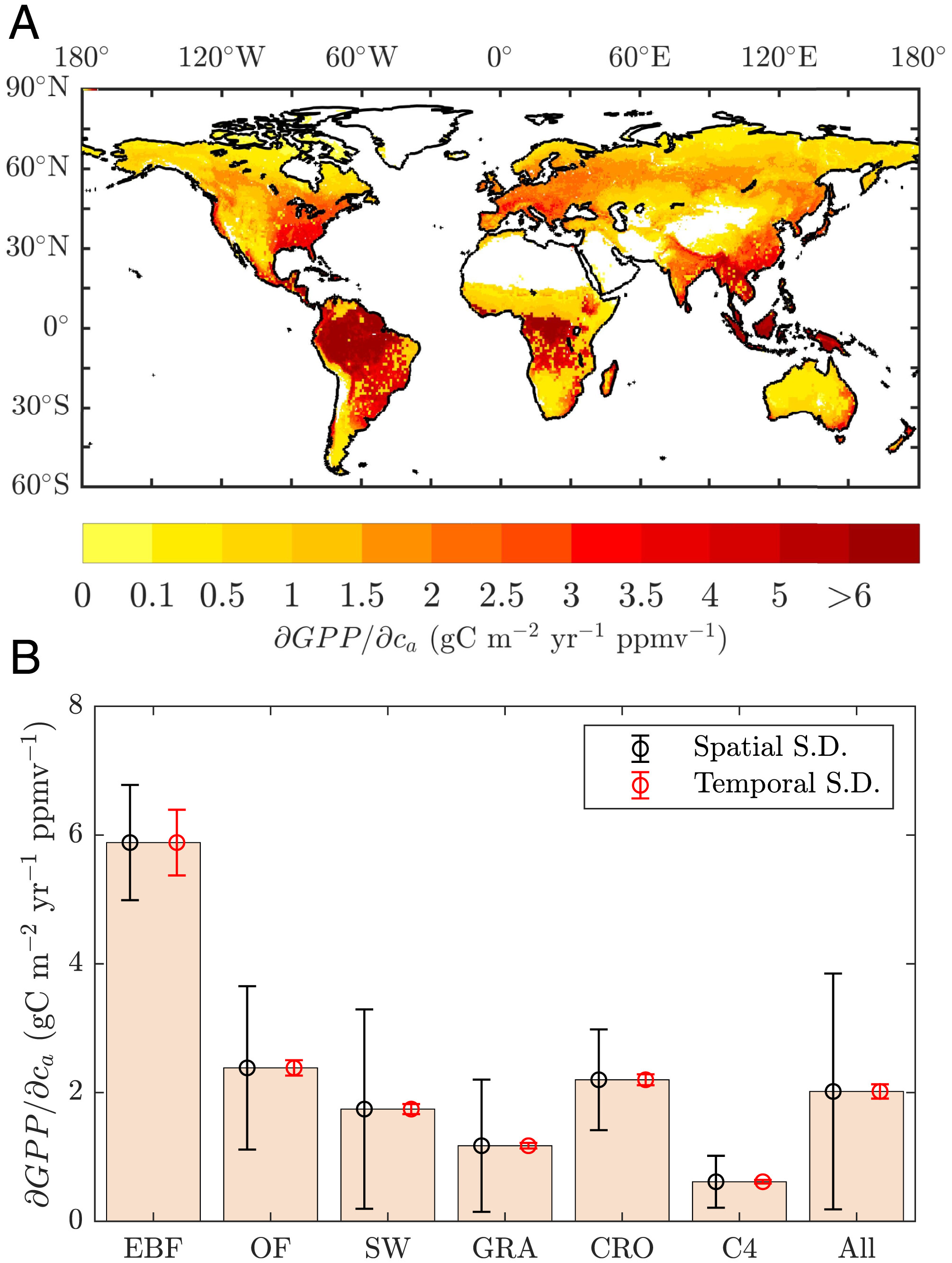
Top: the extent to which plant growth benefits from CO_{2} in different areas (red=more positive impact.) Bottom: the impact on the main types of terrestrial biomes: evergreen broadleaf forests (EBFs), other forests (OF), short woody vegetation (SW), grasslands (GRA), croplands (CRO), plants with C4 carbon fixation and total.

The CO_{2} fertilization effect or carbon fertilization effect causes an increased rate of photosynthesis while limiting leaf transpiration in plants. Both processes result from increased levels of atmospheric carbon dioxide (CO_{2}). The carbon fertilization effect varies depending on plant species, air and soil temperature, and availability of water and nutrients. Net primary productivity (NPP) might positively respond to the carbon fertilization effect, although evidence shows that enhanced rates of photosynthesis in plants due to CO_{2} fertilization do not directly enhance all plant growth, and thus carbon storage. The carbon fertilization effect has been reported to be the cause of 44% of gross primary productivity (GPP) increase since the 2000s. Earth System Models, Land System Models and Dynamic Global Vegetation Models are used to investigate and interpret vegetation trends related to increasing levels of atmospheric CO_{2}. However, the ecosystem processes associated with the CO_{2} fertilization effect remain uncertain and therefore are challenging to model.

Terrestrial ecosystems have reduced atmospheric CO_{2} concentrations and have partially mitigated climate change effects. The response by plants to the carbon fertilization effect is unlikely to significantly reduce atmospheric CO_{2} concentration over the next century due to the increasing anthropogenic influences on atmospheric CO_{2}. Earth's vegetated lands have shown significant greening since the early 1980s largely due to rising levels of atmospheric CO_{2}.

Theory predicts the tropics to have the largest uptake due to the carbon fertilization effect, but this has not been observed. The amount of CO_{2} uptake from CO_{2} fertilization also depends on how forests respond to climate change, and if they are protected from deforestation.

Changes in atmospheric carbon dioxide may reduce the nutritional quality of some crops, with for instance wheat having less protein and less of some minerals. Food crops could see a reduction of protein, iron and zinc content in common food crops of 3 to 17%.

== Mechanism ==
Through photosynthesis, plants use CO_{2} from the atmosphere, water from the ground, and energy from the sun to create sugars used for growth and fuel. While using these sugars as fuel releases carbon back into the atmosphere (photorespiration), growth stores carbon in the physical structures of the plant (i.e. leaves, wood, or non-woody stems). With about 19 percent of Earth's carbon stored in plants, plant growth plays an important role in storing carbon on the ground rather than in the atmosphere. In the context of carbon storage, growth of plants is often referred to as biomass productivity. This term is used because researchers compare the growth of different plant communities by their biomass, amount of carbon they contain.

Increased biomass productivity directly increases the amount of carbon stored in plants. And because researchers are interested in carbon storage, they are interested in where most of the biomass is found in individual plants or in an ecosystem. Plants will first use their available resources for survival and support the growth and maintenance of the most important tissues like leaves and fine roots which have short lives. With more resources available plants can grow more permanent, but less necessary tissues like wood.

If the air surrounding plants has a higher concentration of carbon dioxide, they may be able to grow better and store more carbon and also store carbon in more permanent structures like wood. Evidence has shown this occurring for a few different reasons. First, plants that were otherwise limited by carbon or light availability benefit from a higher concentration of carbon. Another reason is that plants are able use water more efficiently because of reduced stomatal conductance. Plants experiencing higher CO_{2} concentrations may benefit from a greater ability to gain nutrients from mycorrhizal fungi in the sugar-for-nutrients transaction. The same interaction may also increase the amount of carbon stored in the soil by mycorrhizal fungi.

== Observations and trends ==
From 2002 to 2014, plants appear to have gone into overdrive, starting to pull more CO_{2} out of the air than they have done before. The result was that the rate at which CO_{2} accumulates in the atmosphere did not increase during this time period, although previously, it had grown considerably in concert with growing greenhouse gas emissions.

A 1993 review of scientific greenhouse studies found that a doubling of CO_{2} concentration would stimulate the growth of 156 different plant species by an average of 37%. Response varied significantly by species, with some showing much greater gains and a few showing a loss. For example, a 1979 greenhouse study found that with doubled CO_{2} concentration the dry weight of 40-day-old cotton plants doubled, but the dry weight of 30-day-old maize plants increased by only 20%.

In addition to greenhouse studies, field and satellite measurements attempt to understand the effect of increased CO_{2} in more natural environments. In free-air carbon dioxide enrichment (FACE) experiments plants are grown in field plots and the CO_{2} concentration of the surrounding air is artificially elevated. These experiments generally use lower CO_{2} levels than the greenhouse studies. They show lower gains in growth than greenhouse studies, with the gains depending heavily on the species under study. A 2005 review of 12 experiments at 475–600 ppm showed an average gain of 17% in crop yield, with legumes typically showing a greater response than other species and C4 plants generally showing less. The review also stated that the experiments have their own limitations. The studied CO_{2} levels were lower, and most of the experiments were carried out in temperate regions. Satellite measurements found increasing leaf area index for 25% to 50% of Earth's vegetated area over the past 35 years (i.e., a greening of the planet), providing evidence for a positive CO_{2} fertilization effect.

Depending on environment, there are differential responses to elevated atmospheric CO_{2} between major 'functional types' of plant, such as C_{3} and C_{4} plants, or more or less woody species; which has the potential among other things to alter competition between these groups. Increased CO_{2} can also lead to increased Carbon : Nitrogen ratios in the leaves of plants or in other aspects of leaf chemistry, possibly changing herbivore nutrition. Studies show that doubled concentrations of CO_{2} will show an increase in photosynthesis in C3 plants but not in C4 plants. However, it is also shown that C_{4} plants are able to persist in drought better than the C_{3} plants.

== Experimentation by enrichment ==
The effects of CO_{2} enrichment can be most simply attained in a greenhouse (see Greenhouse § Carbon dioxide enrichment for its agricultural use). However, for experimentation, the results obtained in a greenhouse would be doubted due to it introducing too many confounding variables. Open-air chambers have been similarly doubted, with some critiques attributing, e.g., a decline in mineral concentrations found in these CO_{2}-enrichment experiments to constraints put on the root system. The current state-of-the art is the FACE methodology, where CO_{2} is put out directly in the open field. Even then, there are doubts over whether the results of FACE in one part of the world applies to another.

=== Free-Air CO_{2} Enrichment (FACE) experiments ===
The ORNL conducted FACE experiments where CO_{2} levels were increased above ambient levels in forest stands. These experiments showed:

- Increased root production stimulated by increased CO_{2}, resulting in more soil carbon.
- An initial increase of net primary productivity, which was not sustained.
- Faster decline in nitrogen availability in increased CO_{2} forest plots.
- Change in plant community structure, with minimal change in microbial community structure.
- Enhanced CO_{2} cannot significantly increase the leaf carrying capacity or leaf area index of an area.

FACE experiments have been criticized as not being representative of the entire globe. These experiments were not meant to be extrapolated globally. Similar experiments are being conducted in other regions such as in the Amazon rainforest in Brazil.

==== Pine trees ====
Duke University did a study where they dosed a loblolly pine plantation with elevated levels of CO_{2}. The studies showed that the pines did indeed grow faster and stronger. They were also less prone to damage during ice storms, which is a factor that limits loblolly growth farther north. The forest did relatively better during dry years. The hypothesis is that the limiting factors in the growth of the pines are nutrients such as nitrogen, which is in deficit on much of the pine land in the Southeast. In dry years, however, the trees do not bump up against those factors since they are growing more slowly because water is the limiting factor. When rain is plentiful trees reach the limits of the site's nutrients and the extra CO_{2} is not beneficial. Most forest soils in Southeastern region are deficient in nitrogen and phosphorus as well as trace minerals. Pine forests often sit on land that was used for cotton, corn or tobacco. Since these crops depleted originally shallow and infertile soils, tree farmers must work to improve soils.

== Impacts on human nutrition ==
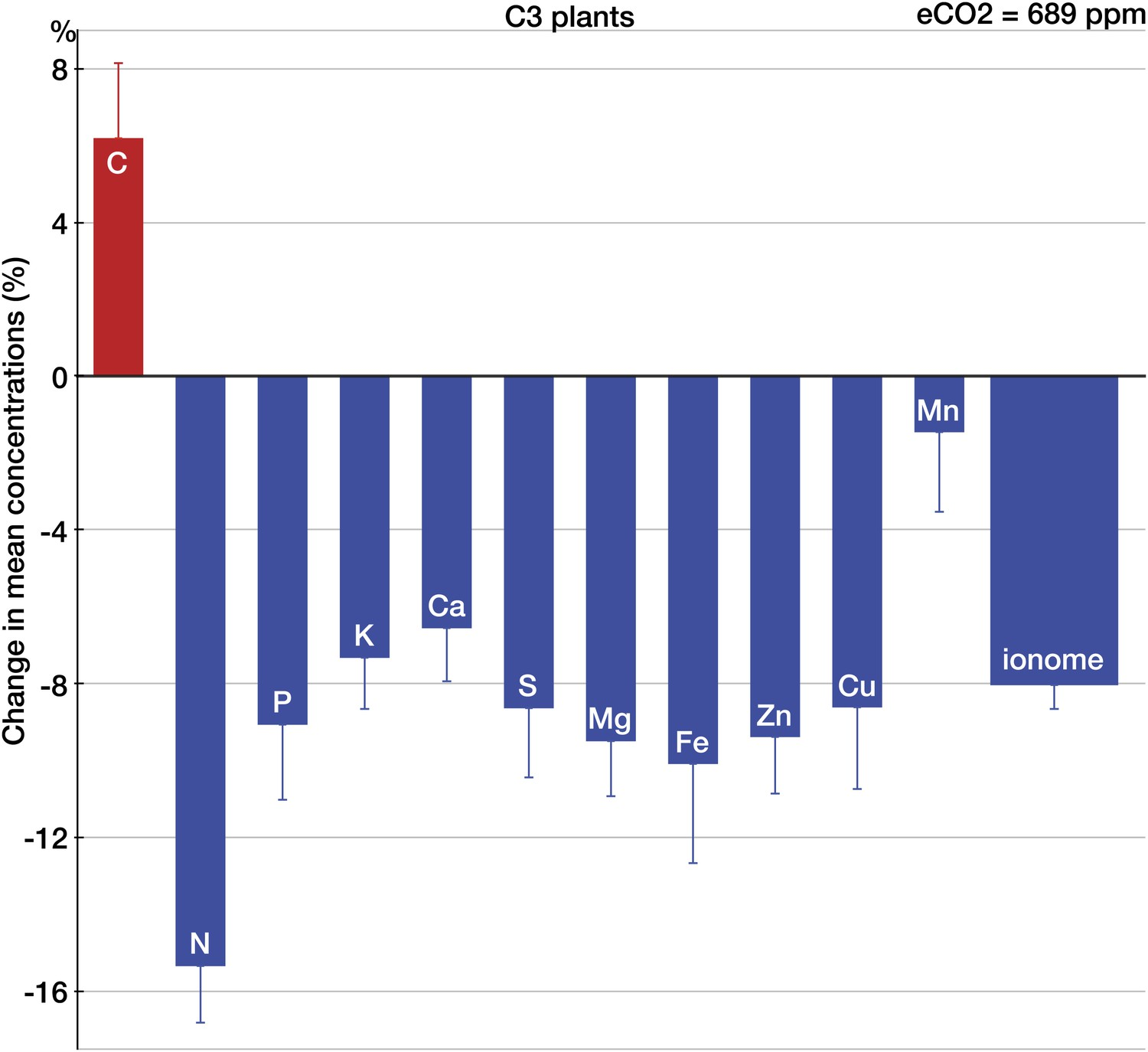
Average decrease of micronutrient density across a range of crops at elevated CO_{2} concentrations, reconstructed from multiple studies through a meta-analysis. The elevated concentration in this figure, 689 ppm, is over 50% greater than the current levels, yet it is expected to be approached under the "mid-range" climate change scenarios, and will be surpassed in the high-emission one.

Changes in atmospheric carbon dioxide may reduce the nutritional quality of some crops, with for instance wheat having less protein and less of some minerals. The nutritional quality of C3 plants (e.g. wheat, oats, rice) is especially at risk: lower levels of protein as well as minerals (for example zinc and iron) are expected. Food crops could see a reduction of protein, iron and zinc content in common food crops of 3 to 17%. This is the projected result of food grown under the expected atmospheric carbon-dioxide levels of 2050. Using data from the UN Food and Agriculture Organization as well as other public sources, the authors analysed 225 different staple foods, such as wheat, rice, maize, vegetables, roots and fruits.

The effect of increased levels of atmospheric carbon dioxide on the nutritional quality of plants is not limited only to the above-mentioned crop categories and nutrients. A 2014 meta-analysis has shown that crops and wild plants exposed to elevated carbon dioxide levels at various latitudes have lower density of several minerals such as magnesium, iron, zinc, and potassium.

Studies using Free-Air Concentration Enrichment have also shown that increases in CO_{2} lead to decreased concentrations of micronutrients in crop and non-crop plants with negative consequences for human nutrition, including decreased B vitamins in rice. This may have knock-on effects on other parts of ecosystems as herbivores will need to eat more food to gain the same amount of protein.

A 2022 narrative review highlighted that climate change not only impacts food quantity but also reduces the nutritional quality of crops. Elevated atmospheric CO_{2} levels have been found to lower concentrations of protein, iron, zinc, and other micronutrients in major staple foods such as wheat and rice. These nutrient losses can lead to widespread deficiencies, particularly in vulnerable populations, and contribute to increased risks of malnutrition. The authors emphasize that climate-smart agriculture and sustainable food systems are urgently needed to protect both food security and human health in the face of these challenges.

Empirical evidence shows that increasing levels of CO_{2} result in lower concentrations of many minerals in plant tissues. Doubling CO_{2} levels results in an 8% decline, on average, in the concentration of minerals. Declines in magnesium, calcium, potassium, iron, zinc and other minerals in crops can worsen the quality of human nutrition. Researchers report that the CO_{2} levels expected in the second half of the 21st century will likely reduce the levels of zinc, iron, and protein in wheat, rice, peas, and soybeans. Some two billion people live in countries where citizens receive more than 60 per cent of their zinc or iron from these types of crops. Deficiencies of these nutrients already cause an estimated loss of 63 million life-years annually.

Alongside a decrease in minerals, evidence shows that plants contain 6% more carbon, 15% less nitrogen, 9% less phosphorus, and 9% less sulfur at double CO_{2} conditions. The increase in carbon is mostly attributed to carbohydrates without a structural role in plants – the human-digestable, calorie-providing starch and simple sugars. The decrease in nitrogen translates directly into a decrease in the protein content. As a result, higher CO_{2} not only reduce a plant's micronutrients, but also the quality of its macronutrient combination.

These nutritional declines have severe consequences for public health worldwide, and especially in areas where they have traditionally consumed plant-based diets. Populations in low- and middle-income countries are particularly at risk, having staple crops like rice and wheat as the primary sources of their daily protein, iron and zinc. Potential nutrient losses as a result of changes in crop composition due to CO_{2} could make any deficiencies that already exist worse and increase the incidence of anemia, stunting, and the development of cognitive skills. Apart from the effect on humans, such changes in nutrient content can cascade through food webs, with herbivores needing to ingest more biomass to meet their dietary needs, which could have implications for ecosystem dynamics. These results highlight the importance of not just looking at crop yields in future climate scenarios, but also at the nutritional merits of yields in terms of their potential to support human and ecological health.

== See also ==
- Effects of climate change on agriculture
