= New Hope Creek =

Stream in North Carolina, USA

New Hope Creek Tributary to New Hope River
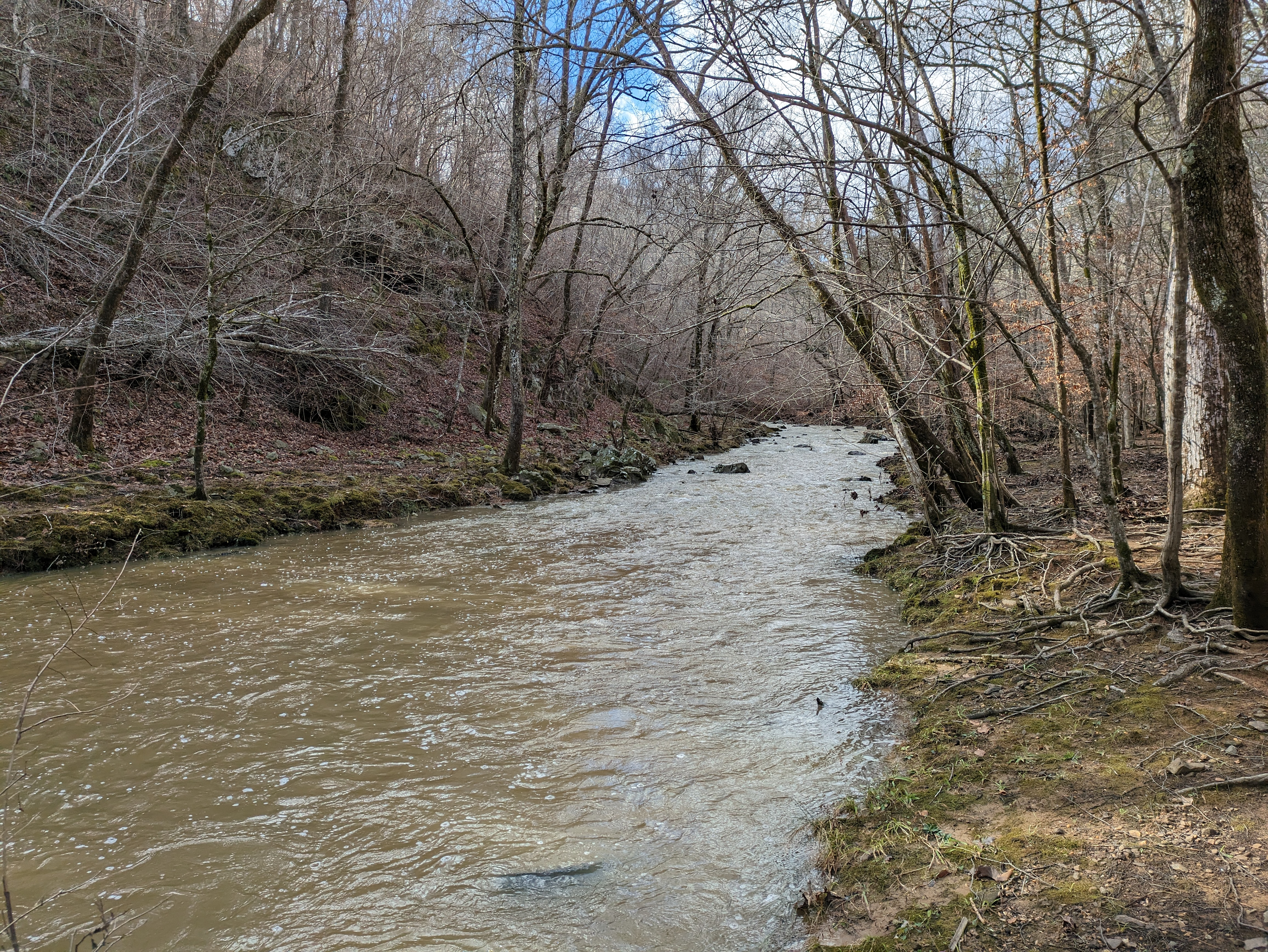

- Location of New Hope Creek mouth New Hope Creek (the United States)

Location
- Country: United States
- State: North Carolina
- County: Chatham; Durham; Orange
- City: Chapel Hill

Physical characteristics
- Source: pond on the divide between New Hope Creek and Cane Creek
  - location: about 3 miles northeast of Orange Grove, North Carolina
  - coordinates: 36°01′26″N 079°09′37″W
  - elevation: 718 ft (219 m)
- Mouth: New Hope River
  - location: B. Everett Jordan Lake
  - coordinates: 35°48′37″N 078°59′48″W
  - elevation: 216 ft (66 m)
- Length: 33.10 mi (53.27 km)
- Basin size: 168.80 square miles (437.2 km^{2})
- Discharge
  - location: New Hope River
  - average: 205.53 cu ft/s (5.820 m^{3}/s) at mouth with New Hope River

Basin features
- Progression: southeast then south
- River system: Haw River
- Tributaries
  - left: Steep Bottom Branch; Pine Mountain Creek; Mud Creek; Sandy Creek; Third Fork Creek; Crooked Creek; Northeast Creek
  - right: Long Branch; Garrett Branch; Mountain Creek; Old Field Creek; Church Branch; Little Creek
- Bridges: Kimbro Road, Silver Apple Road, Boulder Run Road, Borland Road, Arthur Minnis Road (x2), Old Chapel Hill-Hillsborough Road, Walnut Cove Road, Foxlair Road, New Hope Church Road, I-40, NC 86, Mt. Sinai Road, Turkey Farm Road, Erwin Road, US 15, Old Chapel Hill Road, Nelson Chapel Hill Road (NC 54), I-40, Stagecoach Road

New Hope Creek is a watercourse that rises in rural Orange County, North Carolina, in the United States. It drains the western portion of Orange County and the southern half of Durham County and flows into the northern end of Jordan Lake reservoir. The drainage area encompasses urban, suburban and rural lands. Formerly the New Hope River, it was a tributary of the Cape Fear River until it was dammed to create Jordan Lake. Construction of the lake began in 1973, after a comprehensive study of regional water management by the U.S. Army Corps of Engineers, motivated by major flooding in a 1945 hurricane. Several communities draw drinking water from Jordan Lake, increasing interest in protection of the New Hope Creek watershed.

Since the late 1980s, local environmentalists have tried to protect a 20-mile corridor along New Hope Creek for conservation and recreational use. A comprehensive plan for the corridor was approved in 1992 by the City of Durham, Durham County, Orange County and the town of Chapel Hill. Since that time, approximately $3 million has been spent on land acquisition in the corridor and several miles of public trails have been constructed. Publicly accessible trails along New Hope Creek exist within Duke Forest and the Triangle Land Conservancy's Johnston Mill Nature Preserve

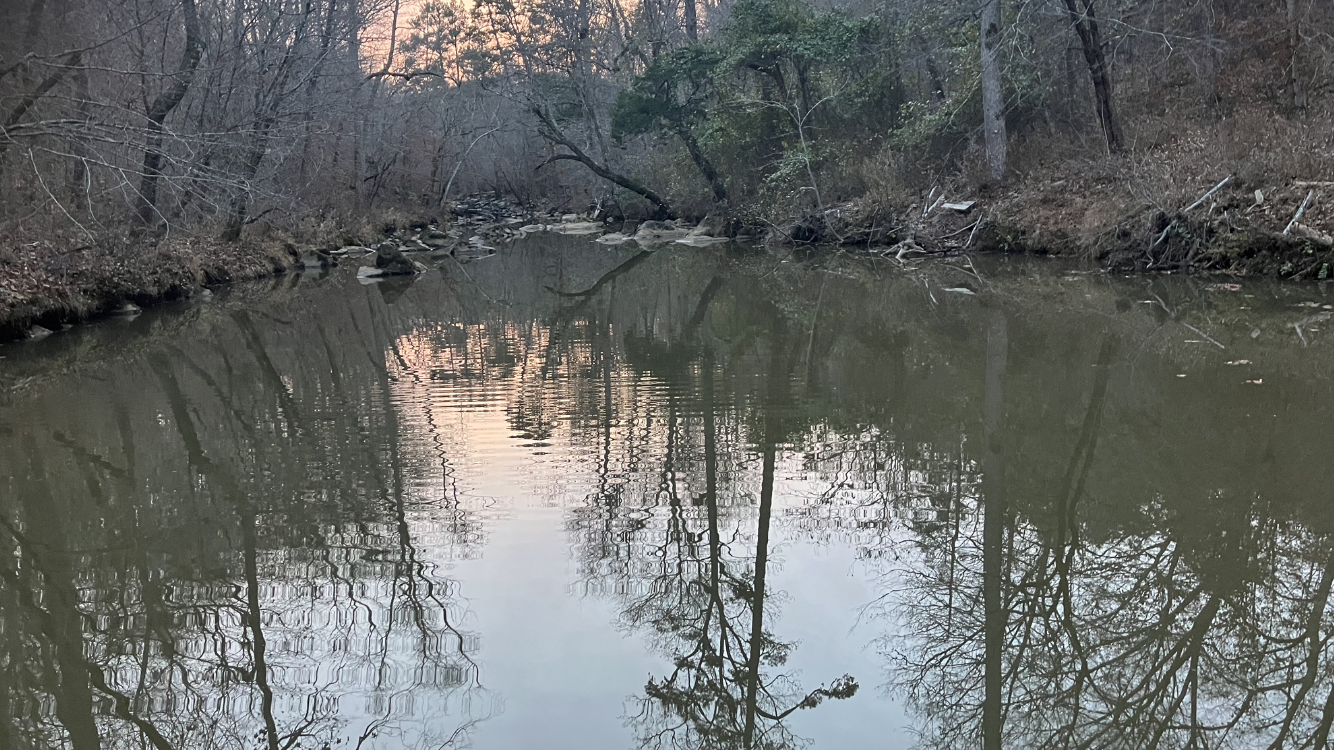
New Hope Creek in Duke Forest

== Ecology ==
The creek is home to many species of fish, including but not limited to: Largemouth bass, bluegill, green sunfish, golden shiner, black crappie, white perch, bowfin, white catfish, brown bullhead, flat bullhead, channel catfish, threadfin shad and notchlip redhorse.
