= North Carolina Environmental Management Commission =

The North Carolina Environmental Management Commission is a group of 15 members appointed by the governor of North Carolina.

This group is responsible for making rules to protect and make better North Carolina's air and water. The members are chosen for knowledge or interest in many topics including medical profession, agriculture, engineering, fish and wildlife, groundwater, air and water pollution control. The commission oversees many other related many other departments. The Committee usually meets on the 2nd Thursday of every other month.

The Commission was created by a law based by the General Assembly of North Carolina in 1974. The law requires that at least one physician, health services representative, one agricultural export, one engineer with a focus in water supply or pollution control, a conservation expert, a hydrologist, three members at large, one manufacturer, someone familiar with local government, a research and a biologist focused on water ecosystems.
