= Duke Forest =

Forest in North Carolina, United States

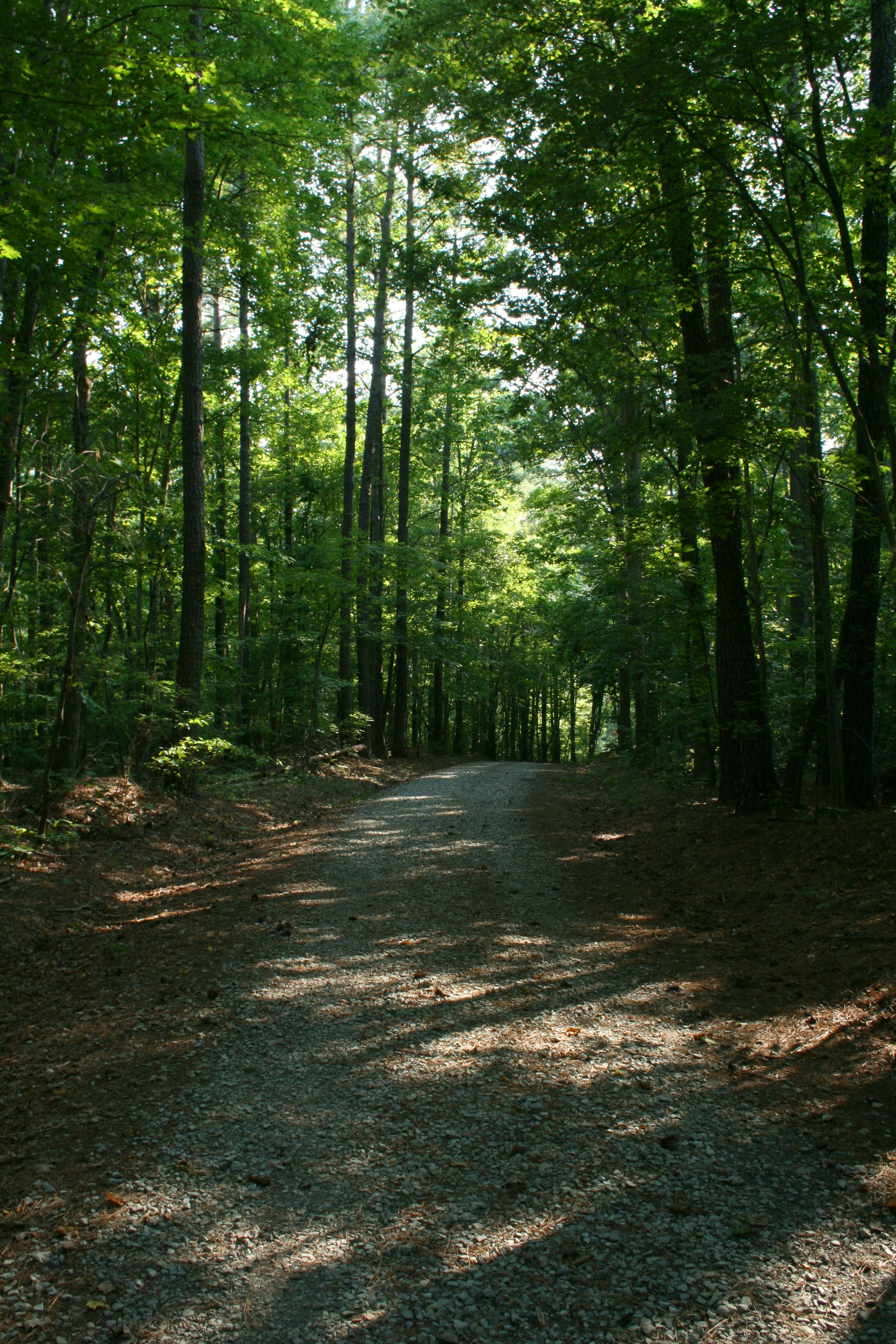
Woods Road entering Duke Forest (Korstian Division) from Mt. Sinai Rd.

Duke Forest is a forest managed by Duke University for research, teaching, and recreation. It is located in the edge of the Piedmont (United States) in Durham County, Orange County, and Alamance County in North Carolina. Four of its six divisions lie within the triangle formed by Durham, Chapel Hill, and Hillsborough.

== Description ==
Duke Forest comprises over 7,000 acres and is made up of six divisions which are fully accessible for teaching and research. Numerous forest types and ecosystems, soils, and previous land uses are represented on the forest. It is a valuable resource to Duke University for its size, accessibility, length of management, and accumulation of long-term data.

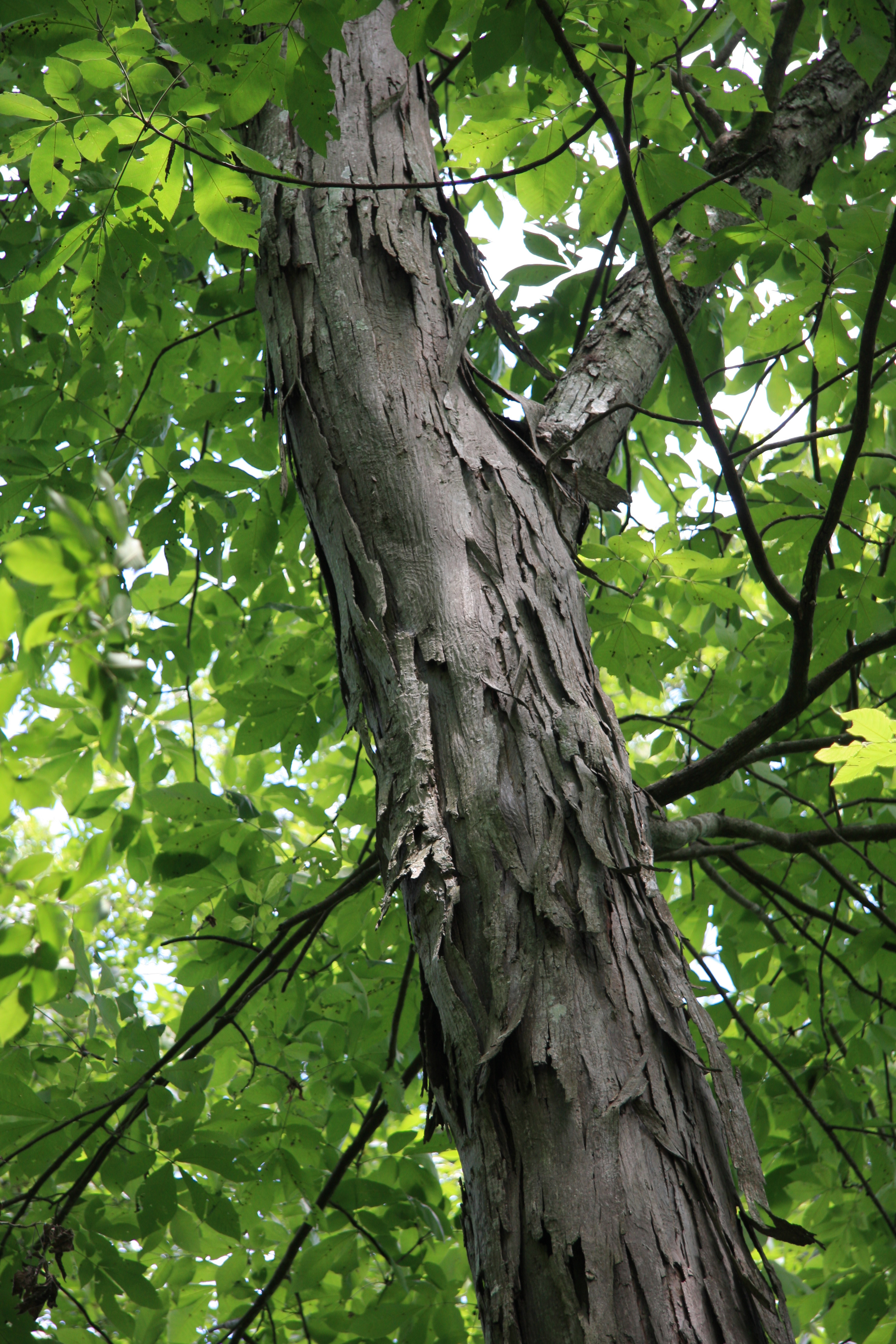
Shagbark hickory, in Duke Forest

Like much of the North Carolina Piedmont, the forest was farmed for cotton. After about a century of such management, the soils' native fertility was exhausted, and could no longer create the yields necessary to support farmers. Then, in 1929, the Great Depression began. Land was abandoned and secondary succession began. Pioneer species such as loblolly pine, yellow poplar, and sweetgum quickly colonized these abandoned farm fields. These trees now dominate much of the forest.

Some parts are dominated by oak and hickory trees. These correspond to old woodlots between fields. Many of these stands were never cleared for agriculture. Thus, these stands bear the closest resemblance to precolonial conditions.

== Research ==
For several decades, Duke Forest has been the site of much scientific research. According to Duke, it hosts over 50 active projects at any given time, including, but not limited to, research on nanotechnology and environmental science, stream ecology and urbanization, invasive species, and historical and social science.

=== FACE experiment ===
One of the most significant and influential studies that has been done in Duke Forest is the Free-Air CO₂ Enrichment (FACE) experiment, which took place in the Blackwood Division of the forest and ran from 1996 to 2010. It used FACE technology to investigate how forests respond to elevated carbon dioxide levels, especially examining forest growth, nutrient cycling, and ecosystem processes.

The experiment used eight plots in an area primarily planted with loblolly pines. Four of the eight plots were fumigated with CO₂ to raise concentration levels, while the other four remained at natural CO₂ levels, serving as controls. The scalability of this design supported comparisons across time, species, and treatment conditions.

Researchers have used data from this study to examine not only carbon storage and nutrient cycling, but also tree fecundity (a tree's reproductive capacity), forest productivity (the total amount of carbon a forest accumulates over a given time period), leaf-level differences in response to CO₂, and more. Insights from this research have been key to the improvement of ecosystem and carbon cycle models, improving researchers' ability to predict how forests will function as environmental conditions change in the future.

== Divisions ==
- Durham Division (Durham County)
- Korstian Division (Orange County)
- Edeburn (formerly 'Eno') Division (Orange County)
- Blackwood Division (Orange County)
- Hillsboro Division (Orange County)
- Dailey Division (Alamance County)

== Management ==
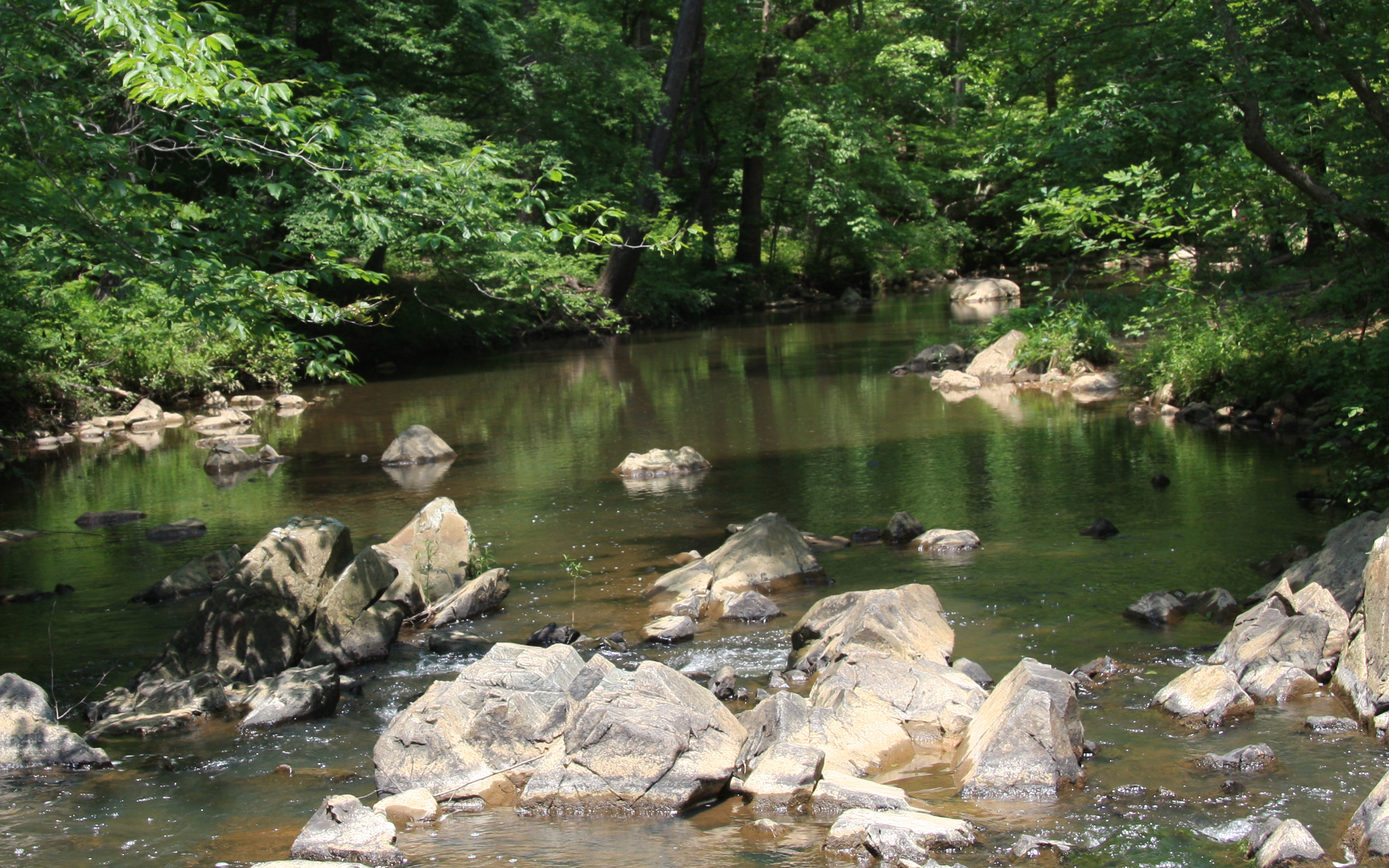
New Hope Creek, Duke Forest Korstian Division.

From inception, Duke Forest's priorities have been research and teaching. The Forest initially supported the teaching and research activities of the newly created Duke School of Forestry. Limited areas are logged each year, providing revenue to support forest management, but also for each generation of Forestry students to study the patterns and timing of succession after different logging treatments. Activities in the forest have now broadened to include botany, zoology, soil science, geography, and many other fields, in addition to the forestry and environmental science activities of the present-day version of the Duke School of Forestry, the Nicholas School of the Environment. The Duke University Lemur Center is located in Duke Forest, off Erwin Road.

The forest is visited every year by thousands of students from local schools and universities, and many other universities and organizations throughout the nation. Research data and records are made available for use elsewhere, as well as at Duke.

== Recreation ==
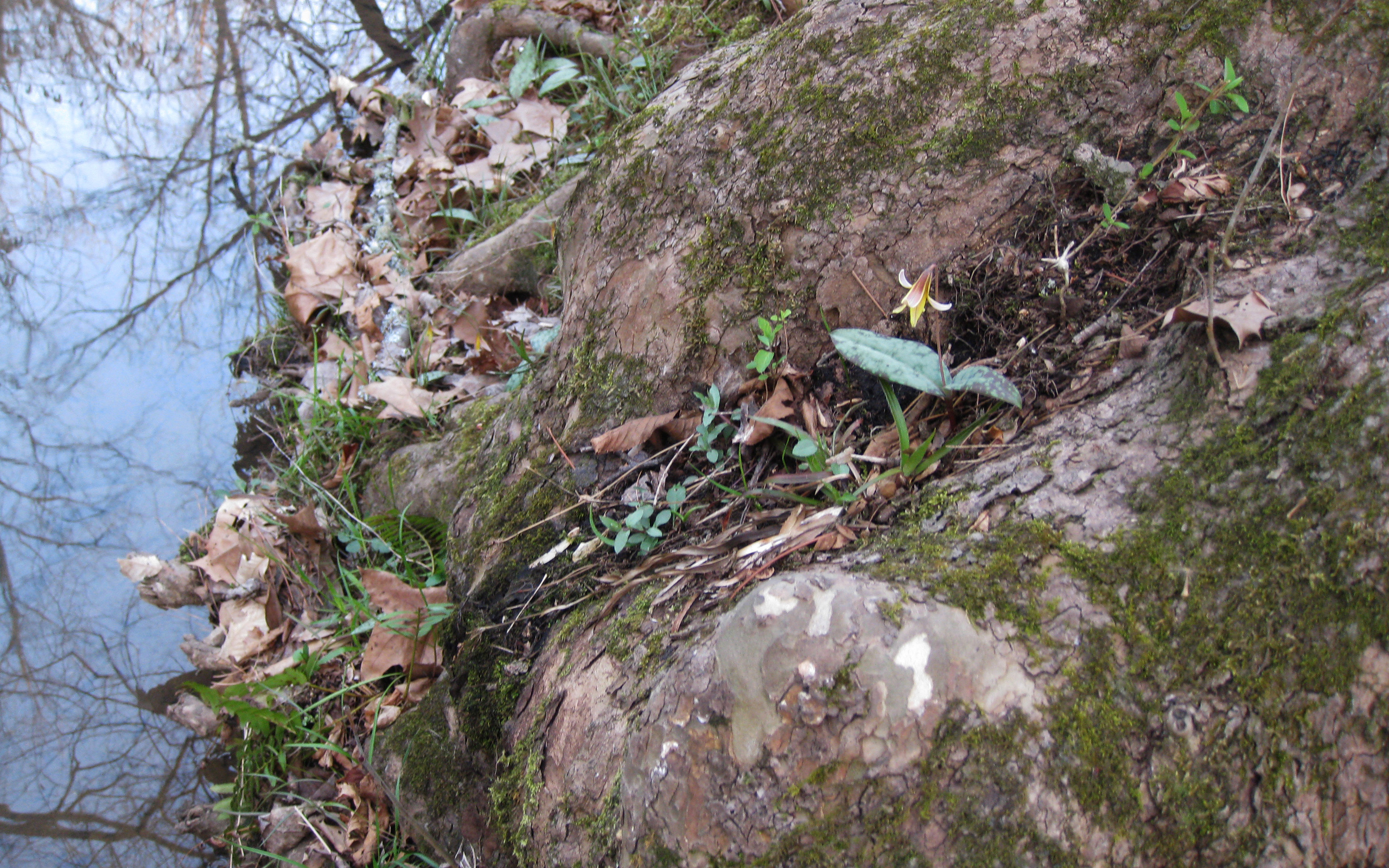
Trout lily blooming in early spring between roots of streamside sycamore, along path near New Hope Creek. Duke Forest Korstian Division.

The Duke Forest has many roads and trails through some of the most scenic areas near Duke University, through woods with streams, flowers, and wildlife. Limited public access, including biking, hiking, and horseback riding, is allowed on established forest roads as long as it does not conflict with research and teaching activities. It also serves as home to the many runners on Duke's cross country running teams.

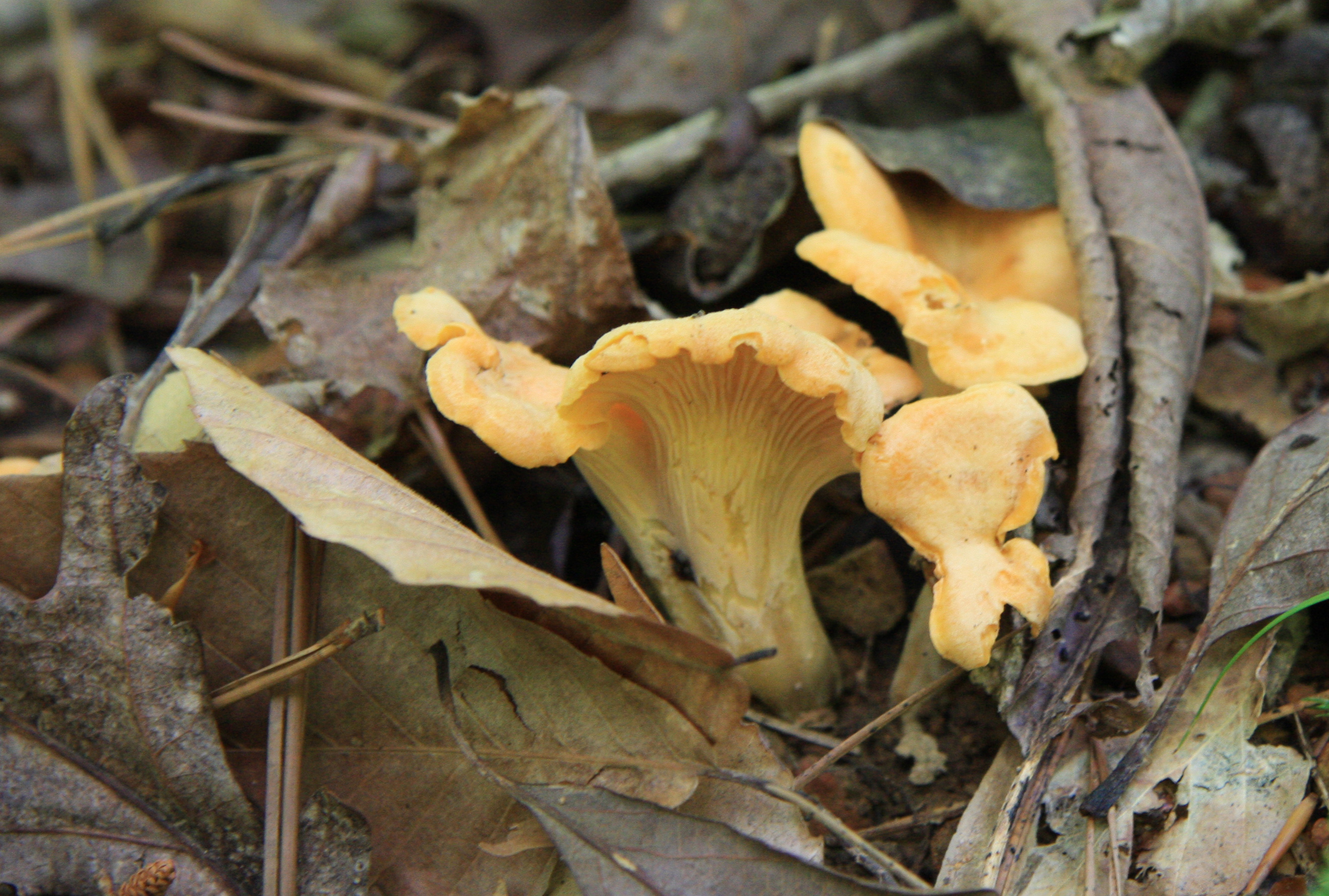
Chanterelle mushrooms on woods floor, Duke Forest

== See also ==
- Forestry
- New Hope Creek
