= Free-air concentration enrichment =

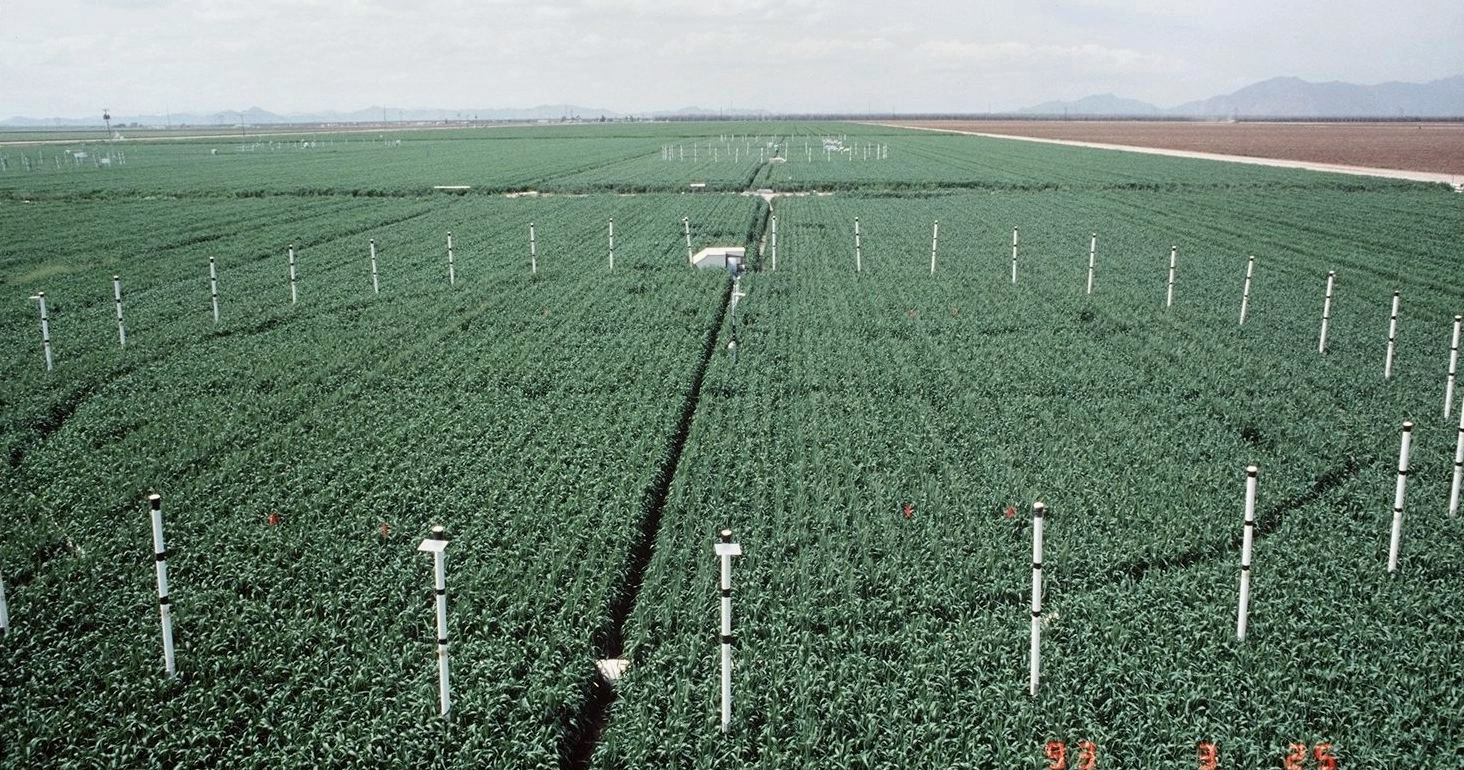
FACE facility in the Nevada desert.

Free-Air Carbon dioxide Enrichment (FACE) is a method used by ecologists and plant biologists that raises the concentration of CO_{2} in a specified area and allows the response of plant growth to be measured. Experiments using FACE are required because most studies looking at the effect of elevated CO_{2} concentrations have been conducted in labs and where there are many missing factors including plant competition. Measuring the effect of elevated CO_{2} using FACE is a more natural way of estimating how plant growth will change in the future as the CO_{2} concentration rises in the atmosphere. FACE also allows the effect of elevated CO_{2} on plants that cannot be grown in small spaces (trees for example) to be measured. However, FACE experiments carry significantly higher costs relative to greenhouse experiments.

== Method ==
Horizontal or vertical pipes are placed in a circle around the experimental plot, which can be between 1m and 30m in diameter, and these emit CO_{2} enriched air around the plants. The concentration of CO_{2} is maintained at the desired level through placing sensors in the plot which feedback to a computer which then adjusts the flow of CO_{2} from the pipes.

== Usage ==
FACE circles have been used in the United States in temperate forests and also in stands of aspen in Italy. The method is also utilized for agricultural research. For example, FACE circles have been used to measure the response of soybean plants to increased levels of ozone and carbon dioxide at research facilities at the University of Illinois at Urbana–Champaign. FACE technologies have yet to be implemented in old growth forests, or key biomes for carbon sequestration, such as tropical forests, or boreal forests and identifying future research priorities for these regions is considered an urgent concern.

Examples of this method being used globally include TasFACE, which is investigating the effects of elevated CO_{2} on a native grassland in Tasmania, Australia. The National Wheat FACE array is presently being established in Horsham, Victoria, Australia as a joint project of the Victorian Department of Primary Industries and the University of Melbourne. EucFACE is Australia's only forest FACE experiment, and was established by the University of Western Sydney in Cumberland Plain Woodland dominated by Eucalyptus tereticornis near Richmond, New South Wales in 2012.

A FACE experiment began at Duke University in June 1994. The Blackwood Division of the Duke Forest contains the Forest-Atmosphere Carbon Transfer and Storage facility. This consists of four free-air CO_{2} enrichment plots which provide higher levels of atmospheric CO_{2} concentration and four plots that provide ambient CO_{2} control. There have been 253 publications reporting on the findings of the experiment.

== Results ==
In 2004, a meta-analysis of 15 years of FACE studies, found the response to elevated CO_{2} using FACE only slightly increases yield in crop plants (5-7% in rice and 8% in wheat). These responses were lower than was expected from previous studies that measured the effect in labs or enclosures. This has important consequences as previous projections of food production have assumed that decreases in yield as a result of climate change would be offset by increases in yield due to elevated CO_{2}.

As of 2010, a more complete picture is emerging, with significant difference in response being observed for different plant species, water availabilities and the concentration of ozone. For example, the 2007-2010 Horsham FACE project (using wheat crops) in Victoria, Australia, found "The effect of eCO2 was to increase crop biomass at maturity by 20% and anthesis root biomass increased by 49%". This study also concludes that "a wide gene pool needs to be investigated to see if particular cultivars are able to respond more to eCO2". Increased atmospheric carbon dioxide has been found to reduce plant water use, and consequently, the uptake of nitrogen, so particularly benefiting crop yields in arid regions. The carbohydrate content of crops is increased from photosynthesis, but protein content is reduced due to lower nitrogen uptake. Legumes and their symbiotic "nitrogen fixing" bacteria appear to benefit more from increased carbon dioxide levels than most other species.
