= Jordan Lake =

Lake in North Carolina, U.S.

B. Everett Jordan Lake
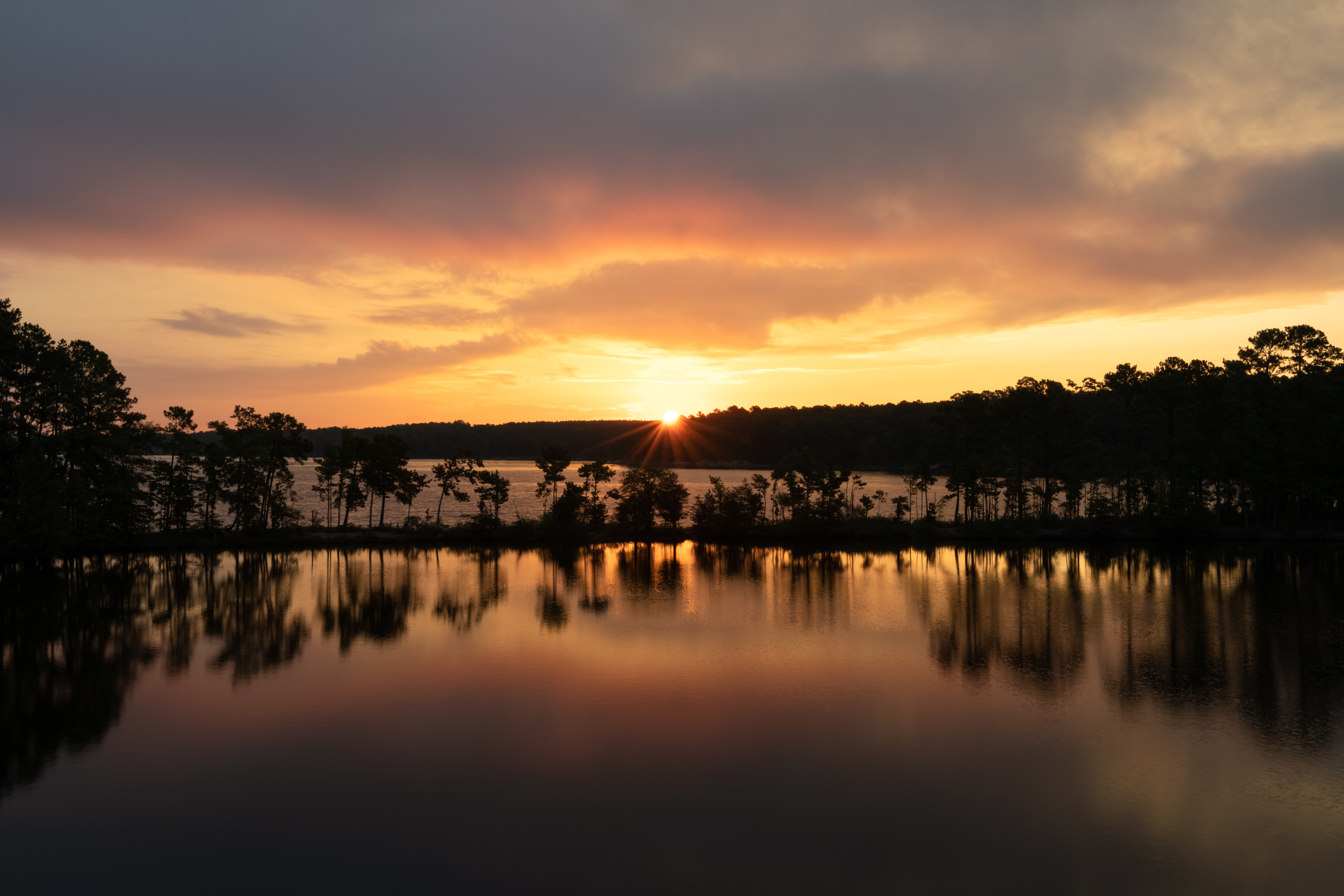
- The sun rising over Jordan Lake, taken from Farrington Road

- Location within North Carolina Location within the United States
- Location: Chatham / Durham counties, North Carolina, United States
- Coordinates: 35°45′0″N 79°1′30″W
- Lake type: Reservoir
- Primary inflows: Haw River, New Hope Creek, Morgan Creek, and Little Creek
- Primary outflows: Haw River
- Basin countries: United States
- Managing agency: United States Army Corps of Engineers
- Max. length: 16 miles (26 km)
- Max. width: 5 miles (8.0 km)
- Surface area: 13,940 acres (56.4 km^{2}); 31,800 acres (129 km^{2}) flood control pool
- Average depth: 14 feet (4.3 m)
- Max. depth: 38 feet (12 m)
- Water volume: 215,100 acre-feet (265.3 hm^{3})
- Shore length^{1}: 180 mi (290 km)
- Surface elevation: 216 ft (66 m)
- Frozen: never
- ^{1} Shore length is not a well-defined measure.

B. Everett Jordan Lake is a reservoir in New Hope Valley, west of Cary and south of Durham in Chatham County, North Carolina, in the United States; the northernmost end of the lake extends into southwestern Durham County.

Part of the Jordan Lake State Recreation Area, the reservoir covers 13,940 acres (5,640 ha) with a shoreline of 180 miles (290 km) at its standard water level of 216 feet (66 m) above sea level. Impounded in 1974, it was developed as part of a flood control project prompted by a particularly damaging tropical storm that hit the region downstream in September 1945. Constructed at an original cost of US$146,300,000, it is owned and operated by the United States Army Corps of Engineers, which dammed and flooded the Haw River and New Hope River between 1973 and 1983.

== History ==
Prior to colonization, the area that would later become Jordan Lake was settled by native Americans in the Early Archaic period in about 8000 BC.

Around 450 historic and prehistoric sites exist in the Jordan Lake Area. In the late 1970's, archeologist Steve Claggett submitted seven samples from Jordan Lake and one was found to be the earliest radiocarbon date ever discovered in North Carolina. However, this title remains debated to today since there are Paleo-Indian artifacts that have been found elsewhere in North Carolina that have not been radiocarbon dated.

In the 1740's, the area began to be settled by Scottish Highlanders and this area was also the site for Revolutionary and Civil War events.

In the 1840's, during the time of slavery in the US, the town of Friendship was formed as one of the first desegregated towns in the south. This decision to integrate was over 100 years before the Civil Rights Act of 1964. The demographic of the integrated town included both freed and enslaved Black families, both White families that did and did not hold slaves, and Indigenous families. The town would face harassment from the KKK.

In the 1950's, the government began acquiring land in and around Friendship to build the New Hope Dam. In 1963, Senator B. Everett Jordan secured the funding needed to build Jordan Lake. Construction for the lake started in 1967 by the U.S. Army Corps of Engineers and completed filling in 1982.

== Construction ==
The Jordan Lake Dam (also known as the B. Everett Jordan Project and the New Hope Dam) is located at 35°39′15″N 79°4′0″W 4 miles (6.4 km) upstream from the mouth of the Haw River in the upper Cape Fear River drainage basin. Completed in 1974 by the Nello L. Teer Company, it is 1,330 feet (410 m) in length and has a top elevation of 266.5 feet (81.2 m) above mean sea level.

During the construction of the reservoir, much of the area was permanently changed. The Durham and South Carolina Railroad was relocated from the New Hope basin to higher ground but its stations were not rebuilt, and the line itself was soon abandoned. Many farming families were relocated as the project was developed and several roads in eastern Chatham County were either rerouted or taken out of commission completely. Some of the roads were never demolished, but simply allowed to flood over. When the lake is at low water volume, many of these roads can still be seen and some have even been utilized for makeshift boat ramps.

Originally authorized in 1963 as the New Hope Lake Project, the reservoir was renamed in 1974 in memory of B. Everett Jordan, former US Senator from North Carolina.

== Water supply ==
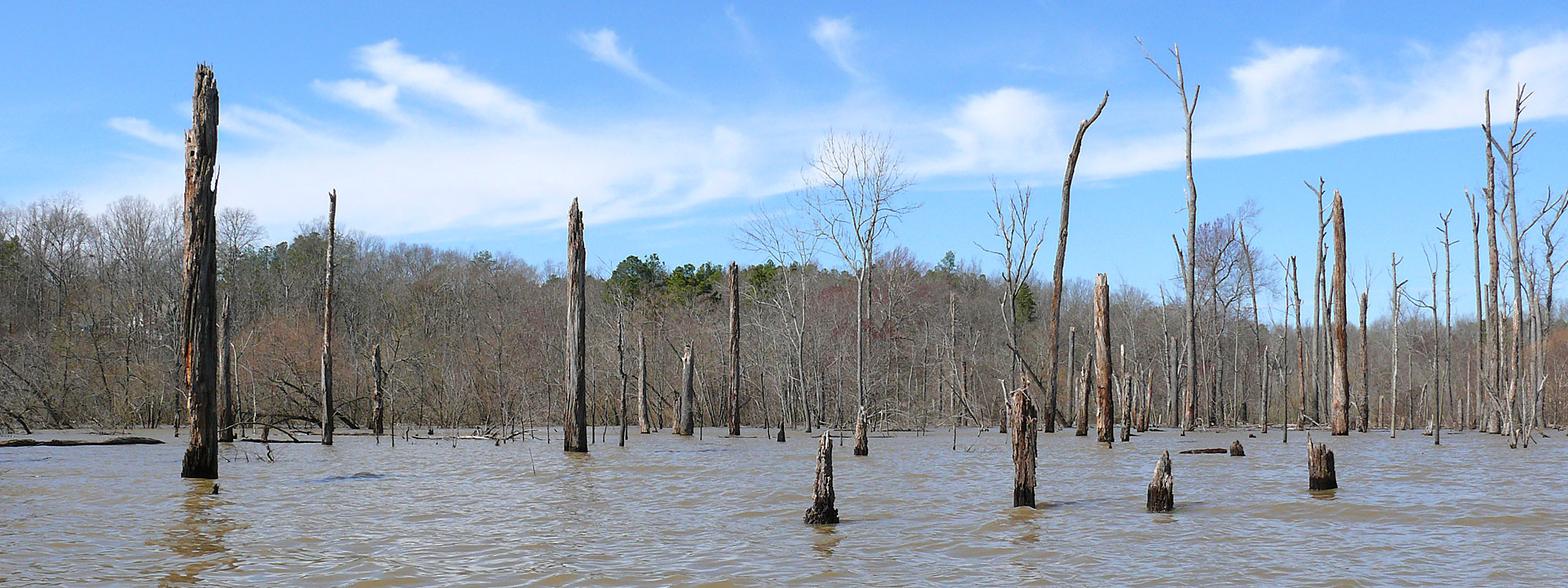
The northern end of Jordan Lake, near the Morgan Creek inlet

Jordan Lake serves as a major water supply for central North Carolina. Allocations made in Round 4 total 95.9% of the water supply pool. Governmental units allocated water from Jordan Lake in Round 4 (approved by the NC EMC on March 9, 2017) include the system jointly operated by Towns of Cary and Apex, which also serves Morrisville and the Wake County portion of Research Triangle Park (46.2%); Chatham County North (13%); City of Durham (16.5%); Town of Holly Springs (2%); Orange County (1.5%); Orange Water & Sewer Authority (5%); City of Raleigh (4.7%); Town of Pittsboro (6%). However, in 2019, following the fourth round of allocations the City of Raleigh relinquished its 4.7% water supply pool allocation. As such it is expected that the remaining unallocated portion of the water supply pool is 8.8%.

Previously, allocations made in 2002 totalled 63 mgd (1% is often assumed to be equal to 1 mgd, but allocations are officially by percentage of the total water supply pool). Governmental units allocated water from Jordan Lake at that time were the Towns of Cary and Apex (32 mgd), Chatham County (6 mgd), City of Durham (10 mgd), Town of Holly Springs (2 mgd), Town of Morrisville (3.5 mgd), Orange County (1 mgd), Orange Water & Sewer Authority (5 mgd), and Wake County - RTP South (3.5 mgd).

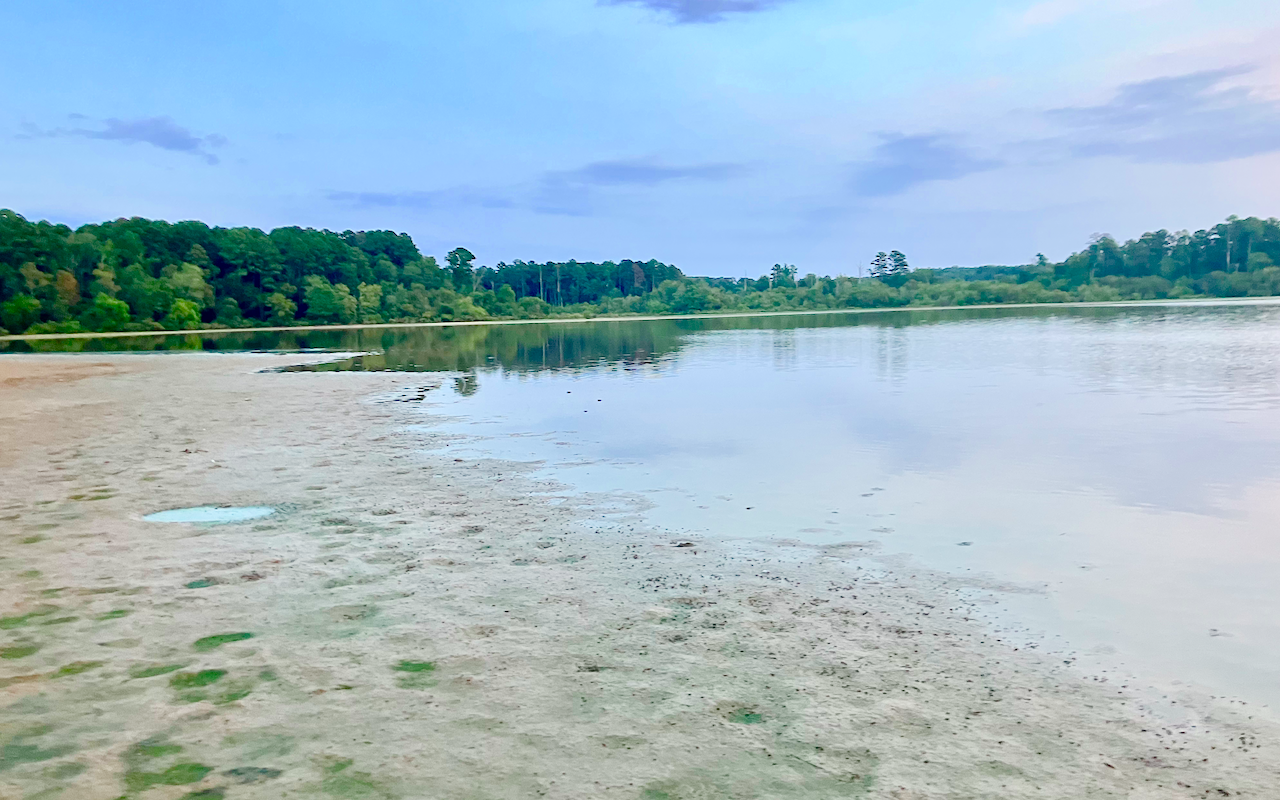
Northeast Creek Inlet of Jordan Lake

Jordan Lake almost completely dried up in 2007 during the 2006–2008 Southeastern United States drought, but recovered when the drought subsided. In the summer of 2026 Jordan Lake again faced significant drought conditions. People on social media even posted photos of old roads being uncovered beneath the lake from the old community. This lake serves as a primary drinking source for many areas of the triangle region, meaning droughts have a direct impact on the surrounding areas water availability.

== Water quality ==
Jordan Lake was declared as nutrient-sensitive waters (NSW) by the North Carolina Environmental Management Commission from 1983, the year it was impounded. The lake is eutrophic or hyper-eutrophic owing to excessive nutrient levels. According to research by Wiltsie and colleagues in 2018, growth in chlorophyll levels and elevated algae in shallow areas of Jordan Lake is largely due to nutrient availability; along with the mixture of these nutrients with sunlight, and water conditions. This research also identified algal blooms and cyanotoxins, dangerous toxins, in Jordan Lake and found they had a strong association with the nutrient levels of the lake. These substances in the water, with contact, can be dangerous to humans and animals.

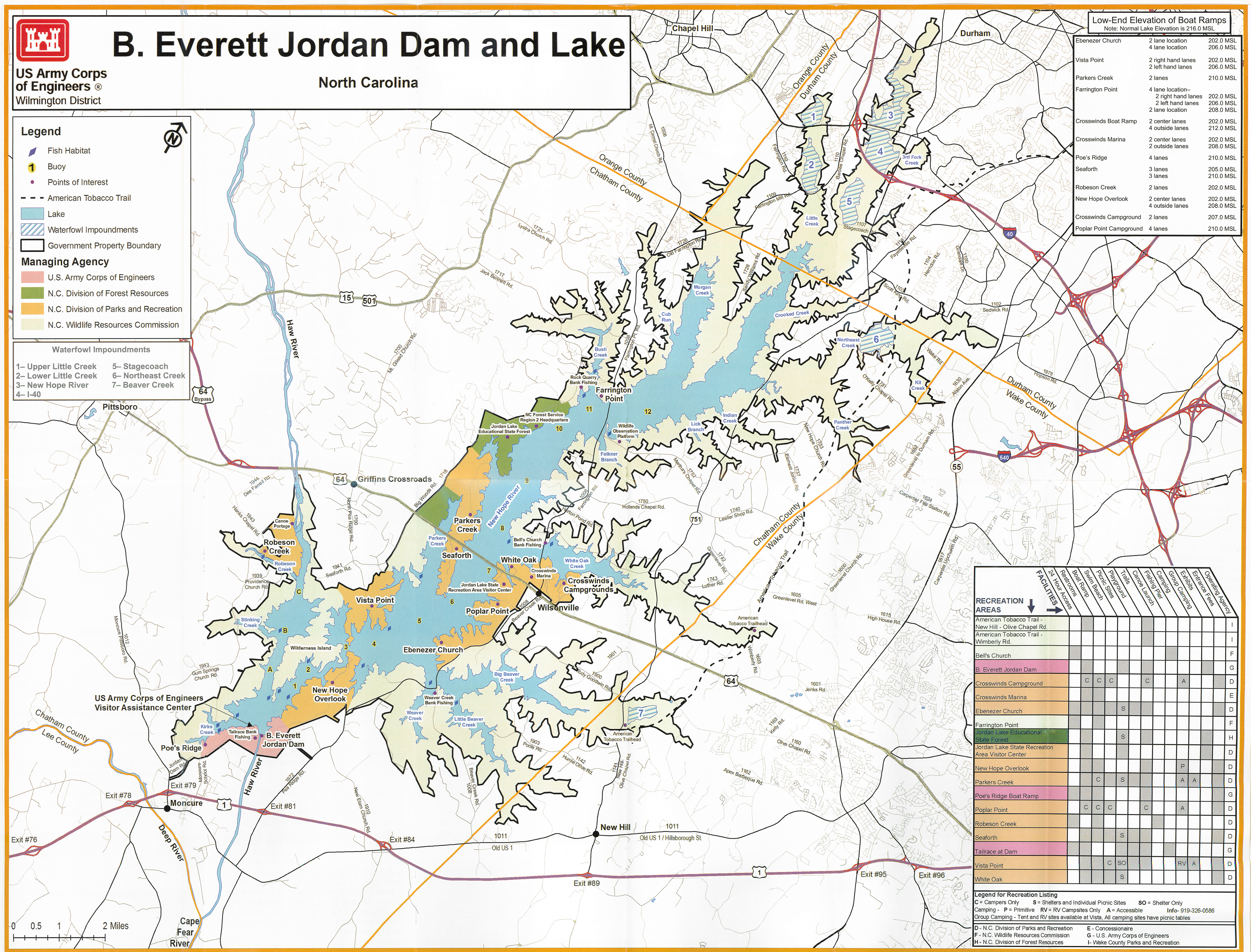
Jordan Lake offers a variety of facilities for recreation, conservation, and flood control.

Requirements of the federal Clean Water Act were triggered when the lake became impaired, including the need to set load reduction limits for point and nonpoint sources and enforce discharge limits.

The Jordan Lake Rules are designed to improve water quality in the lake. The rules were developed with extensive meetings, public hearings and negotiations between residents, environmental groups, local and state government agencies and other stakeholders. The rules mandate reducing pollution from wastewater discharges, stormwater runoff from new and existing development, agriculture and fertilizer application.

However, according to a study done by researchers at NC State University, Jordan Lake's water quality issue might go beyond the pollution from outside the lake, even if no pollution existed the water might still have issues. This is due to a process known as internal phosphorus loading. To explain, phosphorus settles into the bottom of the lake and can later be rereleased into the body of water. According to their findings a large part of the nutrient found in Jordan Lake are stored phosphorus, leading to water quality diminishing.

From July 2011 several NC laws have been passed delaying and weakening the rules, culminating in a plan to deploy floating arrays of in-lake circulators intended to reduce harmful algae and excessive chlorophyll. However, they proved ineffective in a testing program and were removed in 2016.

On December 21, 2017, researchers at Duke University have discovered elevated levels of several perfluorinated compounds an unregulated family of industrial chemicals including some that can raise cancer risks in Jordan Lake and drinking water treated by the town of Cary. Cary water treatment officials, who have independently confirmed the findings of Duke researchers, say the town's water is safe to drink. They also point out that the compounds detected are still below health advisory levels set by the U.S. Environmental Protection Agency.

In the summer of 2026 Jordan Lake again faced significant drought conditions. People on social media even posted photos of old roads being uncovered beneath the lake from the old community. This lake serves as a primary drinking source for many areas of the triangle region, meaning droughts have a direct impact on the surrounding areas water availability.

== Recreational use ==
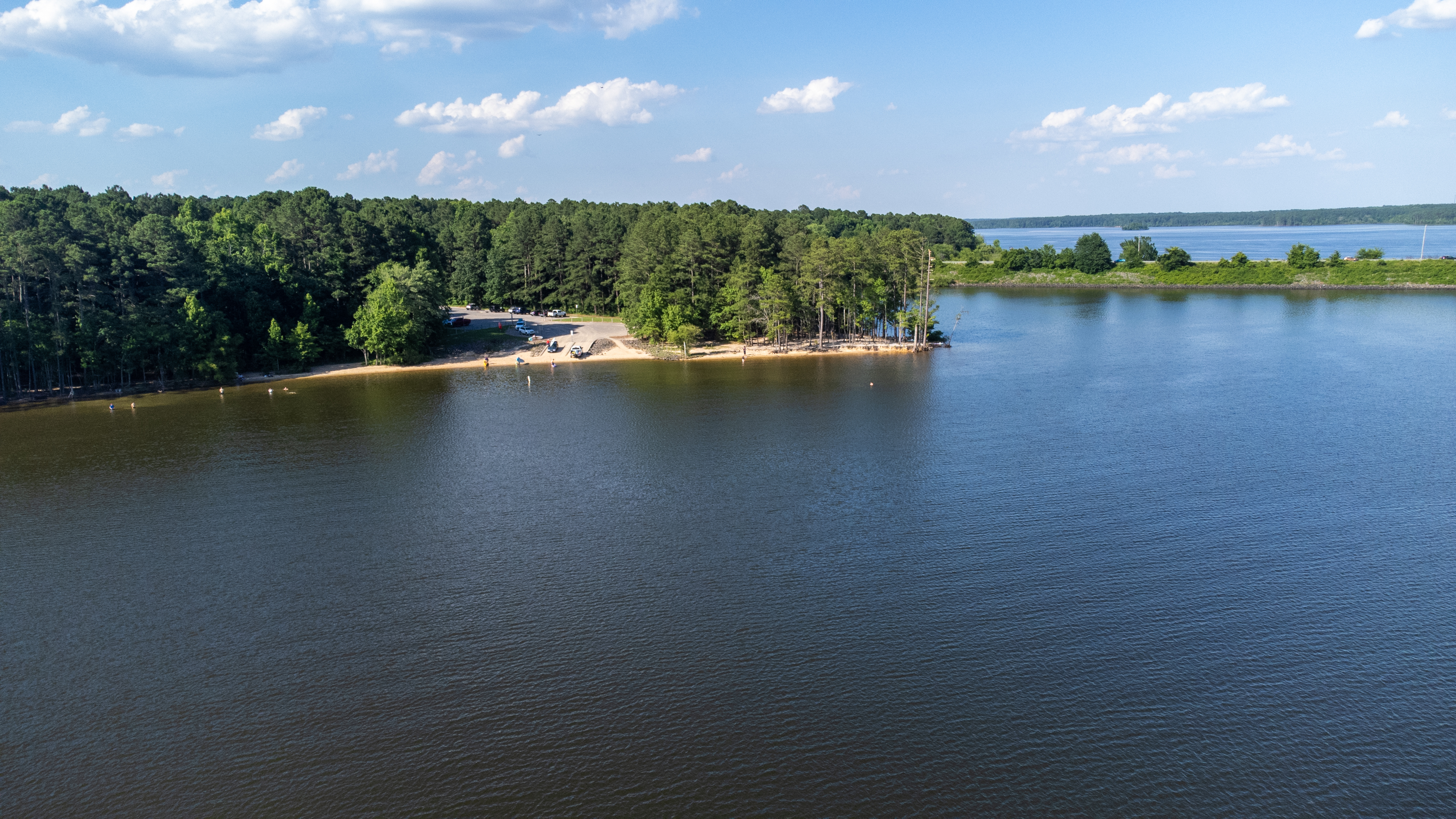
A boat launch ramp at Jordan Lake

Swimming and boating are permitted in the lake. Fishing is also permitted in certain spots. The lake includes five camping access areas with over 1000 campsites. Over half of the sites are located in the Poplar Point campground. Eight easy to moderate hiking trails can be found around the lake.

== Shoreline trash cleanup ==
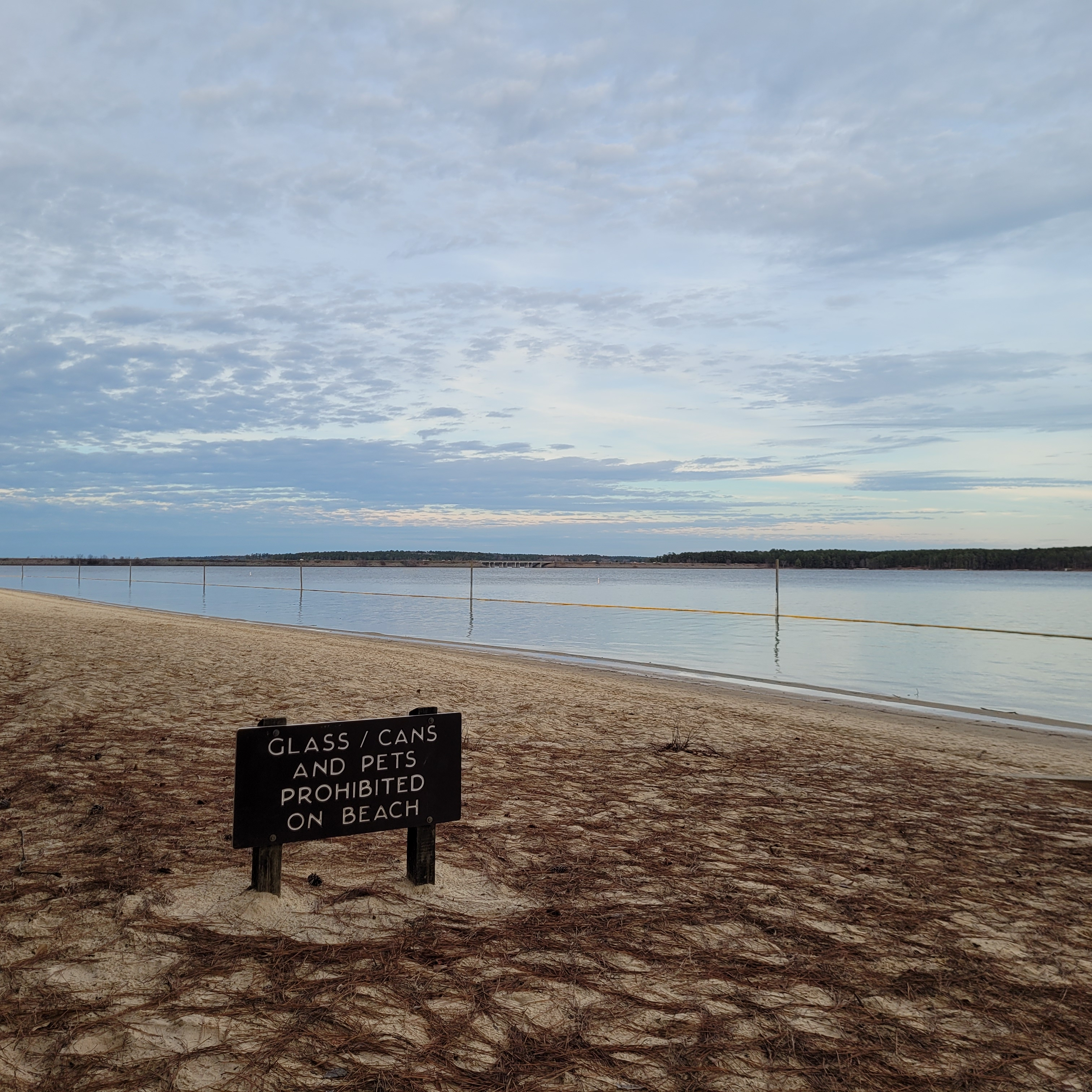
A sign by the lake reads, "Glass / cans and pets prohibited on beach".

Bald eagle habitat being endangered by trash submerged by the lake's creation spurred volunteer efforts to clean up the shoreline and other sensitive areas.

In 2009 the U.S. Army Corps of Engineers worked with local activists to establish Clean Jordan Lake, a nonprofit "friends of the lake" group. Volunteer cleanups aided by the Corps of Engineers began in 2010. Since then, Clean Jordan Lake has organized over 300 community service cleanups, formed the Adopt-A-Shoreline Program that comprises 19 groups that clean habitually littered areas three times per year, and formed the Adopt-A-Feeder Stream Program with semi-annual cleanups to prevent trash from reaching the lake. As of late 2017, 5,600 volunteers have removed 13,500 bags of trash (enough to fill 40 large dumpsters) and 4,300 tires. Clean Jordan Lake estimates that 80% of the trash is from stormwater runoff and 20% from recreational use of the lake.
