= North Carolina's 4th congressional district =

U.S. House district for North Carolina

Coordinates: 36.19°N 78.99°W

- Interactive map of district boundaries since January 3, 2025 (Note: As the mid-decade redistricting bill (S249) enacted on October 22, 2025 only changed the compositions of North Carolina's 1st and 3rd congressional districts, boundaries of other districts will not change at the 2026 elections.)
- Representative: Valerie Foushee; D–Hillsborough
- Population (2025): 817,193
- Median household income: $109,890
- Ethnicity: 53.1% White; 19.7% Black; 11.5% Hispanic; 10.8% Asian; 4.2% Two or more races; 0.8% other
- Cook PVI: D+23

North Carolina's 4th congressional district is located in the central region of the state. The district includes all of Durham County and Orange County as well as northern Chatham County and a portion of Wake County. With a Cook Partisan Voting Index rating of D+23 in 2025, it is one of the most Democratic districts in North Carolina.

Until 2022 the district was represented by 11-term Congressman David Price, a former political science professor at Duke University, who was first elected in 1986, ousting one-term Republican incumbent Bill Cobey. Price was reelected in 1988, 1990, and 1992, but he was defeated in his bid for a fifth term in 1994 by Republican Fred Heineman, the Raleigh Police Chief, in a generally bad year for Democrats in North Carolina. Price came back to defeat Heineman in a rematch in 1996, and has been reelected each time since then by large margins, usually with more than 60% of the vote. In 2020, Price received 67% of the votes (332,421 votes) to defeat Republican challenger Robert Thomas, who received 33% (161,298 votes).

Before court mandated redistricting in 2016, according to research by Christopher Ingraham of The Washington Post, the district was the third-most gerrymandered Congressional district in North Carolina and seventh-most gerrymandered district in the United States. In contrast, its predecessor was the most regularly drawn of the state's 13 districts.

NC-CD4 is currently represented by Congresswoman Valerie Foushee, who was elected to Congress in November 2022, becoming the first African American and first woman to represent the district. Born and raised in Orange County, N.C., Foushee previously served in the N.C. Senate, N.C. House, Orange County Board of Commissioners, and the Chapel Hill-Carrboro City Schools Board. In Congress, Rep. Foushee serves on the House Committee on Transportation and Infrastructure and is the Vice Ranking Member of the Railroads, Pipelines, and Hazardous Materials subcommittee and a member of the Highways and Transit subcommittee. She also serves on the House Committee on Science, Space, and Technology and is the Ranking Member of the Investigations and Oversight subcommittee and a member of the Energy subcommittee.

== History ==
From 2003 to 2013, the district contained most of the area commonly known as The Triangle. It included all of Durham and Orange counties, part of Wake County and a small section of Chatham County. The 4th district picked up the most Republican areas of Wake County, such as Apex, Cary, and much of North Raleigh in order to help make the neighboring 13th and 2nd districts more Democratic. For instance, Barack Obama defeated John McCain in the Wake County portion of the district in 2008 by 51–48%, a difference of less than 8,000 votes in between the two candidates. In contrast, Obama won Wake County overall by a much greater margin of 56–43%, and Obama swept the 4th district as a whole by 63–36%. The Republican influence in the district's Wake County portion was more than canceled out by the two Democratic strongholds of Orange and Durham counties, where Obama received 72% and 76%, respectively, his two best counties in the entire state. The 4th district had a Cook PVI of D+8, which made it the most Democratic white-majority district in the entire South outside of South Florida and Northern Virginia.

The district became even more heavily Democratic as a result of 2012 redistricting, in which the more Republican areas of western and southern Wake County were removed, along with northern Orange County and most of its share of Durham County. They were replaced by heavily Democratic portions of Alamance, Cumberland, Harnett and Lee counties. Additionally, the district was pushed further into Raleigh. Like its predecessor, the district is one of the few Southern districts with a significant concentration of progressive-minded white voters—similar to areas around Atlanta, Houston, Charlotte, Nashville, Memphis and Austin. The presence of the University of North Carolina-Chapel Hill and Duke University, as well as large African-American populations in Durham and Raleigh help contribute to the liberal nature of the 4th district.

Before court mandated redistricting in 2016, the district was just barely contiguous; the northern and southern portions were connected by a barely-discernible strip of land along the Lee/Harnett line. Court-mandated redistricting in 2019 again reconfigured the district, returning large portions of Durham County and removing large portions of Raleigh and Cary, North Carolina.

On February 23, 2022, the North Carolina Supreme Court approved a new map which changed the 4th district boundaries to include Alamance and Person while removing Franklin and the parts of Chatham, Vance and Wake.

== Counties and communities ==
For the 119th and successive Congresses (based on the districts drawn following a 2023 legislative session), the district contains all or portions of the following counties and communities.

Chatham County (7)

Briar Chapel, Carolina Meadows, Cary (part; also 2nd and 9th; shared with Durham and Wake counties), Fearrington Village, Governors Club, Governors Village, Pittsboro

Durham County (6)

All six communities

Orange County (5)

All five communities

Wake County (5)

Apex, Cary (part; also 2nd, 9th, and 13th; shared with Chatham and Durham counties), Fuquay-Varina (part; also 13th), Holly Springs (part; also 13th), Morrisville (part; also 2nd; shared with Durham County)

== Recent election results from statewide races ==
Year	Office	Results
2008	President	Obama 68% - 31%
2008	Senate	Hagan 67% - 30%
2008	Governor	Perdue 63% - 33%
2010	Senate	Marshall 62% - 35%
2012	President	Obama 68% - 32%
2012	Governor	Dalton 61% - 36%
2014	Senate	Hagan 68% - 30%
2016	President	Clinton 69% - 26%
2016	Senate	Ross 67% - 30%
2016	Governor	Cooper 71% - 27%
2016	Lt. Governor	Coleman 67% - 30%
2016	Secretary of State	Marshall 72% - 28%
2016	Auditor	Wood 69% - 31%
2016	Treasurer	Blue III 68% - 32%
2016	Attorney General	Stein 71% - 29%
2020	President	Biden 72% - 26%
2020	Senate	Cunningham 69% - 27%
2020	Governor	Cooper 74% - 24%
2020	Lt. Governor	Lewis Holley 71% - 29%
2020	Secretary of State	Marshall 73% - 27%
2020	Auditor	Wood 73% - 27%
2020	Treasurer	Chatterji 69% - 31%
2020	Attorney General	Stein 73% - 27%
2022	Senate	Beasley 73% - 25%
2024	President	Harris 72% - 26%
2024	Governor	Stein 78% - 18%
2024	Lt. Governor	Hunt 73% - 25%
2024	Secretary of State	Marshall 75% - 25%
2024	Auditor	Holmes 71% - 26%
2024	Treasurer	Harris 71% - 29%
2024	Attorney General	Jackson 75% - 25%

== List of members representing the district ==
Member (Residence)	Party	Years	Cong ress	Electoral history	District location
District established April 19, 1790
John Steele (Salisbury)	Pro-Administration	April 19, 1790 – March 3, 1791	1st	Elected in 1790. Redistricted to the 1st district.	1790–1791 "Yadkin division"
Hugh Williamson (Edenton)	Anti-Administration	March 4, 1791 – March 3, 1793	2nd	Redistricted from the 2nd district and re-elected in 1791. [data missing]	1791–1793 "Albemarle division"
Alexander Mebane (Hillsborough)	Anti-Administration	March 4, 1793 – July 5, 1795	3rd 4th	Elected in 1793. Re-elected in 1795. Died.	1793–1803 [data missing]
Vacant		July 5, 1795 – December 7, 1795	4th		1793–1803 [data missing]
Absalom Tatom (Hillsborough)	Democratic-Republican	December 7, 1795 – June 1, 1796	4th	Elected to finish Mebane's term and seated December 7, 1795. Resigned.	1793–1803 [data missing]
Vacant		June 1, 1796 – December 13, 1796	4th		1793–1803 [data missing]
William F. Strudwick (Wilmington)	Federalist	December 13, 1796 – March 3, 1797	4th	Elected November 23, 1796 to finish Tatom's term and seated December 13, 1796. Retired.	1793–1803 [data missing]
Richard Stanford (Hawfields)	Democratic-Republican	March 4, 1797 – March 3, 1803	5th 6th 7th	Re-elected in 1796. Re-elected in 1798. Re-elected in 1800. Redistricted to the 8th district.	1793–1803 [data missing]
William Blackledge (Spring Hill)	Democratic-Republican	March 4, 1803 – March 3, 1809	8th 9th 10th	Elected in 1803. Re-elected in 1804. Re-elected in 1806. Lost re-election.	1803–1813 "North Carolina congressional district map (1803–13)".
John Stanly (New Bern)	Federalist	March 4, 1809 – March 3, 1811	11th	Elected in 1808. Retired.	1803–1813 "North Carolina congressional district map (1803–13)".
William Blackledge (Spring Hill)	Democratic-Republican	March 4, 1811 – March 3, 1813	12th	Re-elected in 1810. Lost re-election.	1803–1813 "North Carolina congressional district map (1803–13)".
William Gaston (New Bern)	Federalist	March 4, 1813 – March 3, 1817	13th 14th	Re-elected in 1813. Re-elected in 1815. Retired.	1813–1823 "North Carolina congressional district map (1813–43)".
Jesse Slocumb (Waynesborough)	Federalist	March 4, 1817 – December 20, 1820	15th 16th	Re-elected in 1817. Re-elected in 1819. Died.	1813–1823 "North Carolina congressional district map (1813–43)".
Vacant		December 20, 1820 – February 7, 1821	16th		1813–1823 "North Carolina congressional district map (1813–43)".
William S. Blackledge (New Bern)	Democratic-Republican	February 7, 1821 – March 3, 1823	16th 17th	Elected in January 1821 to finish Slocumb's term and seated February 7, 1821. Re-elected later in 1821. Retired.	1813–1823 "North Carolina congressional district map (1813–43)".
Richard D. Spaight Jr. (New Bern)	Democratic-Republican	March 4, 1823 – March 3, 1825	18th	Elected in 1823. Lost re-election.	1823–1833 "North Carolina congressional district map (1813–43)".
John Heritage Bryan (New Bern)	Anti-Jacksonian	March 4, 1825 – March 3, 1829	19th 20th	Elected in 1825. Re-elected in 1827. Retired.	1823–1833 "North Carolina congressional district map (1813–43)".
Jesse Speight (Stantonsburg)	Jacksonian	March 4, 1829 – March 3, 1837	21st 22nd 23rd 24th	Elected in 1829. Re-elected in 1831. Re-elected in 1833. Re-elected in 1835. [data missing]	1823–1833 "North Carolina congressional district map (1813–43)".
Jesse Speight (Stantonsburg)	Jacksonian	March 4, 1829 – March 3, 1837	21st 22nd 23rd 24th	Elected in 1829. Re-elected in 1831. Re-elected in 1833. Re-elected in 1835. [data missing]	1833–1843 "North Carolina congressional district map (1813–43)".
Charles B. Shepard (New Bern)	Whig	March 4, 1837 – March 3, 1839	25th 26th	Elected in 1837. Re-elected in 1839. [data missing]	1833–1843 "North Carolina congressional district map (1813–43)".
Charles B. Shepard (New Bern)	Democratic	March 4, 1839 – March 3, 1841	25th 26th	Elected in 1837. Re-elected in 1839. [data missing]	1833–1843 "North Carolina congressional district map (1813–43)".
William H. Washington (New Bern)	Whig	March 4, 1841 – March 3, 1843	27th	Elected in 1841. [data missing]	1833–1843 "North Carolina congressional district map (1813–43)".
Edmund Deberry (Lawrenceville)	Whig	March 4, 1843 – March 3, 1845	28th	Redistricted from the 7th district and re-elected in 1843. [data missing]	1843–1853 [data missing]
Alfred Dockery (Dockery's Store)	Whig	March 4, 1845 – March 3, 1847	29th	Elected in 1845. [data missing]	1843–1853 [data missing]
Augustine H. Shepperd (Salem)	Whig	March 4, 1847 – March 3, 1851	30th 31st	Elected in 1847. Re-elected in 1849. [data missing]	1843–1853 [data missing]
James T. Morehead (Greensboro)	Whig	March 4, 1851 – March 3, 1853	32nd	Elected in 1851. [data missing]	1843–1853 [data missing]
Sion H. Rogers (Raleigh)	Whig	March 4, 1853 – March 3, 1855	33rd	Elected in 1853. [data missing]	1853–1861 [data missing]
Lawrence O'Bryan Branch (Raleigh)	Democratic	March 4, 1855 – March 3, 1861	34th 35th 36th	Elected in 1855. Re-elected in 1857. Re-elected in 1859. [data missing]	1853–1861 [data missing]
Vacant		March 3, 1861 – July 6, 1868	37th 38th 39th 40th	Civil War and Reconstruction	
John T. Deweese (Raleigh)	Republican	July 6, 1868 – February 28, 1870	40th 41st	Elected to finish the short term. Re-elected in 1868. Resigned.	1868–1873 [data missing]
Vacant		February 28, 1870 – December 7, 1870	41st		1868–1873 [data missing]
John Manning Jr. (Pittsboro)	Democratic	December 7, 1870 – March 3, 1871	41st	Elected to finish Deweese's term. [data missing]	1868–1873 [data missing]
Sion H. Rogers (Raleigh)	Democratic	March 4, 1871 – March 3, 1873	42nd	Elected in 1870. [data missing]	1868–1873 [data missing]
William A. Smith (Princeton)	Republican	March 4, 1873 – March 3, 1875	43rd	Elected in 1872. [data missing]	1873–1883 [data missing]
Joseph J. Davis (Louisburg)	Democratic	March 4, 1875 – March 3, 1881	44th 45th 46th	Elected in 1874. Re-elected in 1876. Re-elected in 1878. [data missing]	1873–1883 [data missing]
William R. Cox (Raleigh)	Democratic	March 4, 1881 – March 3, 1887	47th 48th 49th	Elected in 1880. Re-elected in 1882. Re-elected in 1884. [data missing]	1873–1883 [data missing]
William R. Cox (Raleigh)	Democratic	March 4, 1881 – March 3, 1887	47th 48th 49th	Elected in 1880. Re-elected in 1882. Re-elected in 1884. [data missing]	1883–1893 [data missing]
John Nichols (Raleigh)	Independent	March 4, 1887 – March 3, 1889	50th	Elected in 1886. [data missing]	1883–1893 [data missing]
Benjamin H. Bunn (Rocky Mount)	Democratic	March 4, 1889 – March 3, 1895	51st 52nd 53rd	Elected in 1888. Re-elected in 1890. Re-elected in 1892. [data missing]	1883–1893 [data missing]
Benjamin H. Bunn (Rocky Mount)	Democratic	March 4, 1889 – March 3, 1895	51st 52nd 53rd	Elected in 1888. Re-elected in 1890. Re-elected in 1892. [data missing]	1893–1903 [data missing]
William F. Strowd (Pittsboro)	Populist	March 4, 1895 – March 3, 1899	54th 55th	Elected in 1894. Re-elected in 1896. [data missing]	1893–1903 [data missing]
John W. Atwater (Rialto)	Independent Populist	March 4, 1899 – March 3, 1901	56th	Elected in 1898. [data missing]	1893–1903 [data missing]
Edward W. Pou (Smithfield)	Democratic	March 4, 1901 – April 1, 1934	57th 58th 59th 60th 61st 62nd 63rd 64th 65th 66th 67th 68th 69th 70th 71st 72nd 73rd	Elected in 1900. Re-elected in 1902. Re-elected in 1904. Re-elected in 1906. Re-elected in 1908. Re-elected in 1910. Re-elected in 1912. Re-elected in 1914. Re-elected in 1916. Re-elected in 1918. Re-elected in 1920. Re-elected in 1922. Re-elected in 1924. Re-elected in 1926. Re-elected in 1928. Re-elected in 1930. Re-elected in 1932. Died.	1893–1903 [data missing]
Edward W. Pou (Smithfield)	Democratic	March 4, 1901 – April 1, 1934	57th 58th 59th 60th 61st 62nd 63rd 64th 65th 66th 67th 68th 69th 70th 71st 72nd 73rd	Elected in 1900. Re-elected in 1902. Re-elected in 1904. Re-elected in 1906. Re-elected in 1908. Re-elected in 1910. Re-elected in 1912. Re-elected in 1914. Re-elected in 1916. Re-elected in 1918. Re-elected in 1920. Re-elected in 1922. Re-elected in 1924. Re-elected in 1926. Re-elected in 1928. Re-elected in 1930. Re-elected in 1932. Died.	1903–1913 [data missing]
Edward W. Pou (Smithfield)	Democratic	March 4, 1901 – April 1, 1934	57th 58th 59th 60th 61st 62nd 63rd 64th 65th 66th 67th 68th 69th 70th 71st 72nd 73rd	Elected in 1900. Re-elected in 1902. Re-elected in 1904. Re-elected in 1906. Re-elected in 1908. Re-elected in 1910. Re-elected in 1912. Re-elected in 1914. Re-elected in 1916. Re-elected in 1918. Re-elected in 1920. Re-elected in 1922. Re-elected in 1924. Re-elected in 1926. Re-elected in 1928. Re-elected in 1930. Re-elected in 1932. Died.	1913–1923 [data missing]
Edward W. Pou (Smithfield)	Democratic	March 4, 1901 – April 1, 1934	57th 58th 59th 60th 61st 62nd 63rd 64th 65th 66th 67th 68th 69th 70th 71st 72nd 73rd	Elected in 1900. Re-elected in 1902. Re-elected in 1904. Re-elected in 1906. Re-elected in 1908. Re-elected in 1910. Re-elected in 1912. Re-elected in 1914. Re-elected in 1916. Re-elected in 1918. Re-elected in 1920. Re-elected in 1922. Re-elected in 1924. Re-elected in 1926. Re-elected in 1928. Re-elected in 1930. Re-elected in 1932. Died.	1923–1933 [data missing]
Edward W. Pou (Smithfield)	Democratic	March 4, 1901 – April 1, 1934	57th 58th 59th 60th 61st 62nd 63rd 64th 65th 66th 67th 68th 69th 70th 71st 72nd 73rd	Elected in 1900. Re-elected in 1902. Re-elected in 1904. Re-elected in 1906. Re-elected in 1908. Re-elected in 1910. Re-elected in 1912. Re-elected in 1914. Re-elected in 1916. Re-elected in 1918. Re-elected in 1920. Re-elected in 1922. Re-elected in 1924. Re-elected in 1926. Re-elected in 1928. Re-elected in 1930. Re-elected in 1932. Died.	1933–1943 [data missing]
Harold D. Cooley (Nashville)	Democratic	July 7, 1934 – December 30, 1966	73rd 74th 75th 76th 77th 78th 79th 80th 81st 82nd 83rd 84th 85th 86th 87th 88th 89th	Elected to finish Pou's term. Re-elected in 1934. Re-elected in 1936. Re-elected in 1938. Re-elected in 1940. Re-elected in 1942. Re-elected in 1944. Re-elected in 1946. Re-elected in 1948. Re-elected in 1950. Re-elected in 1952. Re-elected in 1954. Re-elected in 1956. Re-elected in 1958. Re-elected in 1960. Re-elected in 1962. Re-elected in 1964. Resigned.	1933–1943 [data missing]
Harold D. Cooley (Nashville)	Democratic	July 7, 1934 – December 30, 1966	73rd 74th 75th 76th 77th 78th 79th 80th 81st 82nd 83rd 84th 85th 86th 87th 88th 89th	Elected to finish Pou's term. Re-elected in 1934. Re-elected in 1936. Re-elected in 1938. Re-elected in 1940. Re-elected in 1942. Re-elected in 1944. Re-elected in 1946. Re-elected in 1948. Re-elected in 1950. Re-elected in 1952. Re-elected in 1954. Re-elected in 1956. Re-elected in 1958. Re-elected in 1960. Re-elected in 1962. Re-elected in 1964. Resigned.	1943–1953 [data missing]
Harold D. Cooley (Nashville)	Democratic	July 7, 1934 – December 30, 1966	73rd 74th 75th 76th 77th 78th 79th 80th 81st 82nd 83rd 84th 85th 86th 87th 88th 89th	Elected to finish Pou's term. Re-elected in 1934. Re-elected in 1936. Re-elected in 1938. Re-elected in 1940. Re-elected in 1942. Re-elected in 1944. Re-elected in 1946. Re-elected in 1948. Re-elected in 1950. Re-elected in 1952. Re-elected in 1954. Re-elected in 1956. Re-elected in 1958. Re-elected in 1960. Re-elected in 1962. Re-elected in 1964. Resigned.	1953–1963 [data missing]
Harold D. Cooley (Nashville)	Democratic	July 7, 1934 – December 30, 1966	73rd 74th 75th 76th 77th 78th 79th 80th 81st 82nd 83rd 84th 85th 86th 87th 88th 89th	Elected to finish Pou's term. Re-elected in 1934. Re-elected in 1936. Re-elected in 1938. Re-elected in 1940. Re-elected in 1942. Re-elected in 1944. Re-elected in 1946. Re-elected in 1948. Re-elected in 1950. Re-elected in 1952. Re-elected in 1954. Re-elected in 1956. Re-elected in 1958. Re-elected in 1960. Re-elected in 1962. Re-elected in 1964. Resigned.	1963–1973 [data missing]
Vacant		December 30, 1966 – January 3, 1967	89th		1963–1973 [data missing]
Jim Gardner (Rocky Mount)	Republican	January 3, 1967 – January 3, 1969	90th	Elected in 1966. Redistricted to the 2nd district and retired to run for governor of North Carolina.	1963–1973 [data missing]
Nick Galifianakis (Durham)	Democratic	January 3, 1969 – January 3, 1973	91st 92nd	Redistricted from the 5th district and re-elected in 1968. Re-elected in 1970. Retired to run for U.S senator.	1963–1973 [data missing]
Ike F. Andrews (Siler City)	Democratic	January 3, 1973 – January 3, 1985	93rd 94th 95th 96th 97th 98th	Elected in 1972. Re-elected in 1974. Re-elected in 1976. Re-elected in 1978. Re-elected in 1980. Re-elected in 1982. Lost re-election.	1973–1983 [data missing]
Ike F. Andrews (Siler City)	Democratic	January 3, 1973 – January 3, 1985	93rd 94th 95th 96th 97th 98th	Elected in 1972. Re-elected in 1974. Re-elected in 1976. Re-elected in 1978. Re-elected in 1980. Re-elected in 1982. Lost re-election.	1983–1993 [data missing]
Bill Cobey (Chapel Hill)	Republican	January 3, 1985 – January 3, 1987	99th	Elected in 1984. Lost re-election.	1983–1993 [data missing]
David Price (Chapel Hill)	Democratic	January 3, 1987 – January 3, 1995	100th 101st 102nd 103rd	Elected in 1986. Re-elected in 1988. Re-elected in 1990. Re-elected in 1992. Lost re-election.	1983–1993 [data missing]
David Price (Chapel Hill)	Democratic	January 3, 1987 – January 3, 1995	100th 101st 102nd 103rd	Elected in 1986. Re-elected in 1988. Re-elected in 1990. Re-elected in 1992. Lost re-election.	1993–2003 [data missing]
Fred Heineman (Raleigh)	Republican	January 3, 1995 – January 3, 1997	104th	Elected in 1994. Lost re-election.	1993–2003 [data missing]
David Price (Chapel Hill)	Democratic	January 3, 1997 – January 3, 2023	105th 106th 107th 108th 109th 110th 111th 112th 113th 114th 115th 116th 117th	Re-elected in 1996. Re-elected in 1998. Re-elected in 2000. Re-elected in 2002. Re-elected in 2004. Re-elected in 2006. Re-elected in 2008. Re-elected in 2010. Re-elected in 2012. Re-elected in 2014. Re-elected in 2016. Re-elected in 2018. Re-elected in 2020. Retired.	1993–2003 [data missing]
David Price (Chapel Hill)	Democratic	January 3, 1997 – January 3, 2023	105th 106th 107th 108th 109th 110th 111th 112th 113th 114th 115th 116th 117th	Re-elected in 1996. Re-elected in 1998. Re-elected in 2000. Re-elected in 2002. Re-elected in 2004. Re-elected in 2006. Re-elected in 2008. Re-elected in 2010. Re-elected in 2012. Re-elected in 2014. Re-elected in 2016. Re-elected in 2018. Re-elected in 2020. Retired.	2003–2013
David Price (Chapel Hill)	Democratic	January 3, 1997 – January 3, 2023	105th 106th 107th 108th 109th 110th 111th 112th 113th 114th 115th 116th 117th	Re-elected in 1996. Re-elected in 1998. Re-elected in 2000. Re-elected in 2002. Re-elected in 2004. Re-elected in 2006. Re-elected in 2008. Re-elected in 2010. Re-elected in 2012. Re-elected in 2014. Re-elected in 2016. Re-elected in 2018. Re-elected in 2020. Retired.	2013–2017
David Price (Chapel Hill)	Democratic	January 3, 1997 – January 3, 2023	105th 106th 107th 108th 109th 110th 111th 112th 113th 114th 115th 116th 117th	Re-elected in 1996. Re-elected in 1998. Re-elected in 2000. Re-elected in 2002. Re-elected in 2004. Re-elected in 2006. Re-elected in 2008. Re-elected in 2010. Re-elected in 2012. Re-elected in 2014. Re-elected in 2016. Re-elected in 2018. Re-elected in 2020. Retired.	2017–2021
David Price (Chapel Hill)	Democratic	January 3, 1997 – January 3, 2023	105th 106th 107th 108th 109th 110th 111th 112th 113th 114th 115th 116th 117th	Re-elected in 1996. Re-elected in 1998. Re-elected in 2000. Re-elected in 2002. Re-elected in 2004. Re-elected in 2006. Re-elected in 2008. Re-elected in 2010. Re-elected in 2012. Re-elected in 2014. Re-elected in 2016. Re-elected in 2018. Re-elected in 2020. Retired.	2021–2023 Static map of 2021-3 congressional district
Valerie Foushee (Hillsborough)	Democratic	January 3, 2023 – present	118th 119th	Elected in 2022. Re-elected in 2024. Re-elected in 2026.	2023–2025
Valerie Foushee (Hillsborough)	Democratic	January 3, 2023 – present	118th 119th	Elected in 2022. Re-elected in 2024. Re-elected in 2026.	2025–present

== Past election results ==
=== 2002 ===
2002 North Carolina's 4th congressional district election
Party	Candidate	Votes	%
Democratic	David Price (incumbent)	132,185	61.18
Republican	Tuan A. Nguyen	78,095	36.15
Libertarian	Ken Nelson	5,766	2.67
Total votes		216,046	100
Democratic hold			

=== 2004 ===
2004 North Carolina's 4th congressional district election
Party	Candidate	Votes	%
Democratic	David Price (incumbent)	217,441	64.1
Republican	Todd A. Batchelor	121,717	35.88
N/A	Maximilian Longley	76	0.02
Total votes		339,234	100
Democratic hold			

=== 2006 ===
2006 North Carolina's 4th congressional district election
Party	Candidate	Votes	%
Democratic	David Price (incumbent)	127,340	64.99
Republican	Steve Acuff	68,599	35.01
Total votes		195,939	100
Democratic hold			

=== 2008 ===
2008 North Carolina's 4th congressional district election
Party	Candidate	Votes	%
Democratic	David Price (incumbent)	265,751	63.32
Republican	William (B.J.) Lawson	153,947	36.68
Total votes		419,698	100
Democratic hold			

=== 2010 ===
2010 North Carolina's 4th congressional district election
Party	Candidate	Votes	%
Democratic	David Price (incumbent)	155,384	57.16
Republican	William (B.J.) Lawson	116,448	42.84
Total votes		271,832	100
Democratic hold			

=== 2012 ===
2012 North Carolina's 4th congressional district election
Party	Candidate	Votes	%
Democratic	David Price (incumbent)	259,534	74.47
Republican	Tim D'Annunzio	88,951	25.53
Total votes		348,485	100
Democratic hold			

=== 2014 ===
2014 North Carolina's 4th congressional district election
Party	Candidate	Votes	%
Democratic	David Price (incumbent)	169,946	74.75
Republican	Paul Wright	57,416	25.25
Total votes		227,362	100
Democratic hold			

=== 2016 ===
2016 North Carolina's 4th congressional district election
Party	Candidate	Votes	%
Democratic	David Price (incumbent)	279,380	68.22
Republican	Sue Googe	130,161	31.78
Total votes		409,541	100
Democratic hold			

=== 2018 ===
2018 North Carolina's 4th congressional district election
Party	Candidate	Votes	%
Democratic	David Price (incumbent)	247,067	72.4
Republican	Steve Loor	82,052	24.0
Libertarian	Barbara Howe	12,284	3.6
Total votes		341,403	100
Democratic hold			

=== 2020 ===
2020 North Carolina's 4th congressional district election
Party	Candidate	Votes	%
Democratic	David Price (incumbent)	332,421	67.3
Republican	Robert Thomas	161,298	32.7
Total votes		493,719	100
Democratic hold			

=== 2022 ===
2022 North Carolina's 4th congressional district election
Party	Candidate	Votes	%
Democratic	Valerie Foushee	194,983	66.91%
Republican	Courtney Geels	96,442	33.09%
Total votes		291,425	100.00%
Democratic hold			

=== 2024 ===
2024 North Carolina's 4th congressional district election
Party	Candidate	Votes	%
Democratic	Valerie Foushee (incumbent)	308,064	71.9
Republican	Eric Blankenburg	112,084	26.1
Libertarian	Guy Meilleur	8,632	2.0
Total votes		428,780	100.0
Democratic hold			

== See also ==
- List of United States congressional districts
- North Carolina's congressional districts
