= Gulf Creek (Cape Fear River tributary) =

Stream in North Carolina, USA

Gulf Creek Tributary to Cape Fear River
- Location of Gulf Creek Creek mouth Gulf Creek (Cape Fear River tributary) (the United States)

Location
- Country: United States
- State: North Carolina
- County: Chatham County

Physical characteristics
- Source: Buckhorn Creek divide
  - location: about 2 miles north of Corinth, North Carolina
  - coordinates: 35°35′55″N 078°59′20″W
  - elevation: 248 ft (76 m)
- Mouth: Cape Fear River
  - location: about 0.5 miles south of Brickhaven, North Carolina
  - coordinates: 35°33′16″N 079°01′43″W
  - elevation: 151 ft (46 m)
- Length: 4.20 mi (6.76 km)
- Basin size: 8.33 square miles (21.6 km^{2})
- Discharge
  - location: Cape Fear River
  - average: 8.39 cu ft/s (0.238 m^{3}/s) at mouth with Cape Fear River

Basin features
- Progression: Cape Fear River → Atlantic Ocean
- River system: Cape Fear River
- Tributaries
  - left: unnamed tributaries
  - right: unnamed tributaries
- Bridges: Corinth Road

Gulf Creek is a 4.20 mi (6.76 km) long 2nd order tributary to the Cape Fear River in Chatham County, North Carolina.

== Course ==
Gulf Creek rises about 2 miles north of Corinth, North Carolina and then flows southwest to join the Cape Fear River about 0.5 miles south of Brickhaven, North Carolina.

== Watershed ==
Gulf Creek drains 8.33 square miles (21.6 km^{2}) of area, receives about 47.6 in/year of precipitation, has a wetness index of 454.50 and is about 57% forested.

== See also ==
- List of rivers of North Carolina
