= Governors Village =

Governors Village may refer to a location in the United States:

- Governors Village, California
- Governors Village, North Carolina
