= Ada A. Cooper =

19th century Black American teacher and writer

Ada Augusta Newton Harris Cooper (1861–1899) was a 19th-century Black American teacher and writer. Despite humble beginnings, she became a noted orator, giving talks in AME churches around the country, often advocating for women's education and rights. She was also a musician of some note.

== Early life and education ==
Ada Augusta Newton was born on 6 February 1861 in Brooklyn, New York. She is the daughter of Olivia Hamilton Newton and Rev. Alexander H. Newton, an African Methodist Episcopal (AME) Church minister. Her grandfather, Robert Hamilton, was a noted abolitionist. Newton's mother died when she was 7 and she went to live with her grandmother. When she was 15, she wrote the story "The Bride of Death" and moved to Little Rock, Arkansas to live again with her father.

When she was 17, Newton enrolled in Shaw University in Raleigh, North Carolina. She attended for 3 years but did not graduate. At Shaw, she taught reading classes in return for fees.

== Career ==
When Newton was 18, her story, "The Bride of Death," was published in the North Carolina Republican.

Newton taught in Hayward, Raleigh and Washington, North Carolina. In Raleigh, she also edited the woman's column in the local Outlook newspaper. In 1890, she became sick and moved to Maryland. After she recovered, she took a job as a travelling salesman.

Newton lectured in various AME churches around the country, particularly advocating for women's education and rights. She was selected to deliver poems on 1 January 1881 in celebration of emancipation.

In 1891, she also gave a notable speech at the North Carolina Industrial Fair as part of an Interstate Exposition entitled "Our Women: The Party they Play."

== Personal life and death ==
Newton married fellow teacher, Rev. William R. Harris, on 4 May 1884 following a long engagement. However, her husband died in January 1885, less than a year after they married. In 1892, she married the Rev. Dr. Albert B. Cooper.

Cooper died on 18 September 1899. Her obituary noted that she "was one of the foremost and most gifted women workers in the African Methodist Episcopal Church. She was a fine musician, an entertaining and eloquent speaker, an authoress and poetess of no mean talent, and a musical composer of considerable ability."

== Works ==
- Newton, Ada A. "Esta or Estranged". The Banner-Enterprise. Raleigh, North Carolina. Thursday, April 19, 1883
