= Lockville, North Carolina =

Unincorporated community in North Carolina, US

Coordinates: 35.6208°N 79.0919°W

Lockville (also Ramsey's Mill) is an unincorporated community located in southeastern Chatham County, North Carolina, United States, near the community of Moncure.
