= Cape Fear Township, Chatham County, North Carolina =

- Township
- Location of Cape Fear Township in Chatham County

- Location of Chatham County in North Carolina
- Coordinates: 35.617°N 79.007°W
- Country: United States
- State: North Carolina
- County: Chatham

Area
  - Total: 54.26 sq mi (140.52 km^{2})
- Highest elevation (Several locations in the north and south ends of the township): 444 ft (135 m)
- Lowest elevation (Cape Fear River where it flows out of the township in the southwest corner): 138 ft (42 m)

Population (2010)
  - Total: 1,323
  - Density: 24.38/sq mi (9.41/km^{2})
- Time zone: UTC-4 (EST)
  - Summer (DST): UTC-5 (EDT)
- Area code: 919 / 984

Cape Fear Township, population 1,323, is one of thirteen townships in Chatham County, North Carolina. Cape Fear Township is 54.26 square miles (140.5 km^{2}) in size and located in southeast Chatham County. Cape Fear Township does not contain any municipalities within it, but does contain Moncure, a census designated place.

== Geography ==
The Haw River and Cape Fear River form the western boundary of Cape Fear Township. New Hope Creek, impounded as B. Everett Jordan Lake and tributary of the Haw River, forms the northern boundary. Two tributaries of New Hope Creek include Weaver Creek and Little Beaver Creek. Shaddox Creek, a tributary of the Haw River joins just above the Cape Fear River confluence. Gulf Creek and Buckhorn Creek, tributaries of Cape Fear River drain the southeast part of the township.
