= Lockville Dam, Canal and Powerhouse =

- U.S. National Register of Historic Places
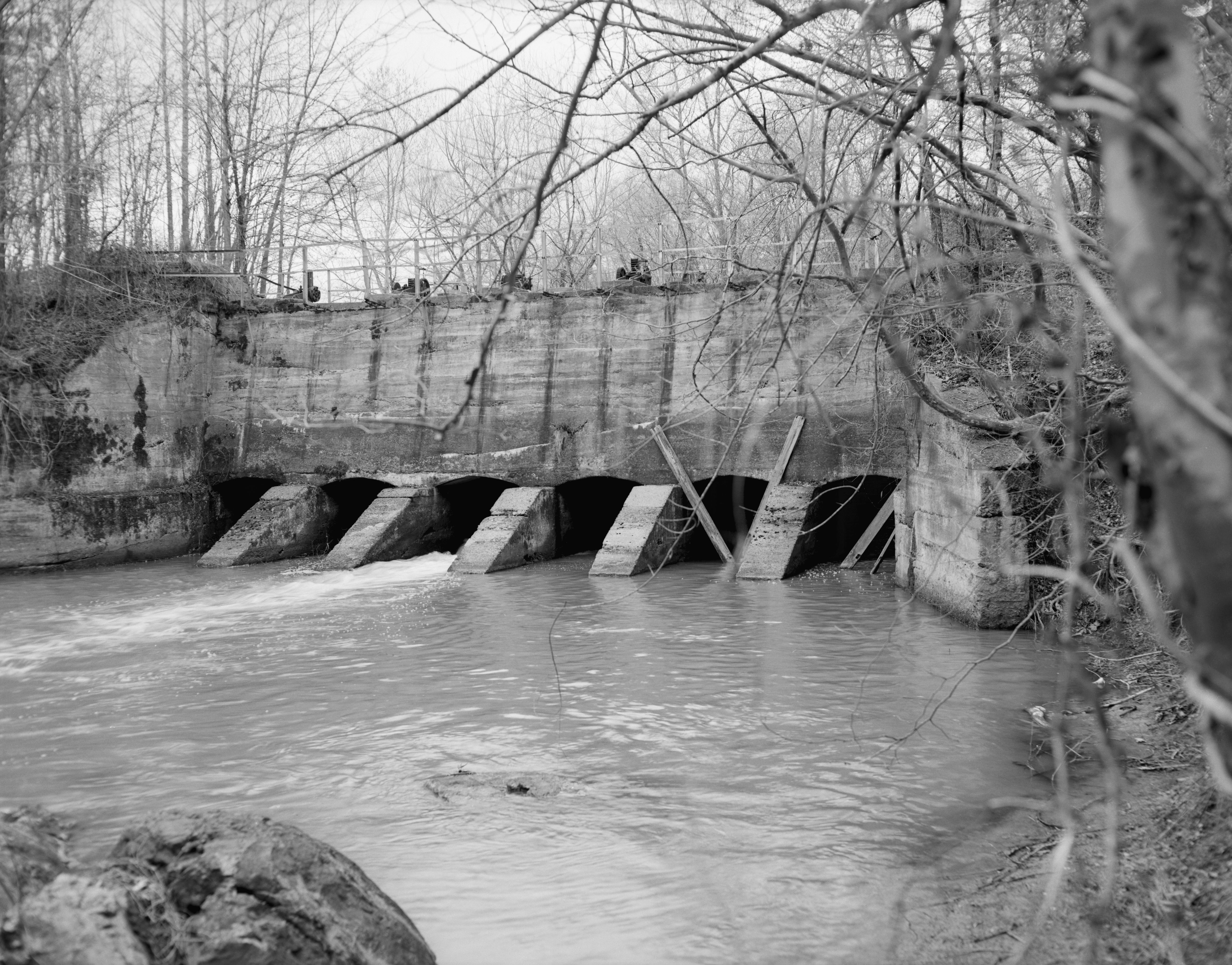
- Lockville Hydroelectric Plant, HAER Photo, March 1982

- Location within North Carolina Location within the United States
- Location: West of Moncure at Deep River and U.S. 1, near Moncure, North Carolina
- Coordinates: 35°37′10″N 79°05′45″W
- Area: 18 acres (7.3 ha)
- Built: c. 1850-1855, 1922
- NRHP reference No.: 84000305
- Added to NRHP: November 20, 1984

Lockville Dam, Canal and Powerhouse is a historic dam, canal, and powerhouse located near Moncure, Chatham County, North Carolina. Cape Fear and Deep River Navigation Company built a wooden dam and canal in 1830 to facilitate navigation. The present hydroelectric dam and powerhouse were built in 1922 replacing the log dam. The powerhouse is a simple brick and concrete structure resting on a massive stone foundation.

The hydroelectric dam generated 1.3MW from 1922 to 1962, then again from 1983 to 2020. It has remained offline since.

It was listed on the National Register of Historic Places in 1984.

== Recent developments (2023–2025) ==
In June 2003 the property was purchased from Lockville Hydro Power Co. by Brooks Energy LLC of Goldston, North Carolina, for $350,000 (equivalent to $612,563 in 2025).

The dam remained inactive for power generation, and in 2023 it was breached at the river right abutment.

In August, 2025, dam owner Brooks Energy, L.L.C. filed with the Federal Energy Regulatory Commission to surrender its hydropower exemption for the site, stating that the dam had been breached and that full removal would be undertaken in cooperation with American Rivers and Resource Environmental Solutions.

When removal is complete, the Deep River at the site will return to a free-flowing state, reconnecting more than 45 miles (72 km) of habitat to the Haw River confluence near Moncure.
