= Corinth, Chatham County, North Carolina =

Unincorporated community in North Carolina, US

Corinth
- Populated place
- Interactive map of Corinth
- Coordinates: 35°34′10″N 78°59′53″W
- Country: United States
- State: North Carolina
- County: Chatham
- Elevation: 282 ft (86 m)
- Time zone: UTC-5 (Eastern (EST))
  - Summer (DST): UTC-4 (EDT)
- Area code: 919
- GNIS feature ID: 973551

Corinth is an unincorporated community in Chatham County, North Carolina, United States. The community is located in the panhandle of Chatham County, southeast of Moncure, on route N.C. 42. It was named in homage to the ancient Greek city of Corinth.

The area near Corinth was previously called Martha's Vineyard. When local resident William Avent campaigned to have a post office put in the community, which opened in 1891, he chose the name of Corinth for it.

In 1913, a rail station was built at Corinth for a section of new line of the Norfolk Southern Railway running from Varina to Colon. The depot was built near the road crossing at T.H. Buchanan's store. A discussion of the community in a 1925 newspaper article describes it as "quite rugged in contrast with [nearby] Brickhaven. The Norfolk and Southern depot is in a considerable valley or gorge. The several stores are dotted about on separate hills. The merchants of the village are veteran L.H. Mims, E.V. Dickens, and E.S. Marks."

A community center building was built in 1953, at which time a local paper described Corinth as having a population of "100-odd people." The post office was closed in 1956.

A 2007 newspaper article described Corinth as a "tiny Chatham County community," its residents living in the "shadow" of the Shearon Harris Nuclear Power Plant, a "small bundle of houses and churches" along N.C. Highway 42.
