= Woods Charter School =

American charter school in North Carolina

Location
- 160 Woodland Grove Lane; Chapel Hill, North Carolina 27516; United States; 35°48′54″N 79°06′35″W

Information
- Type: Charter
- Motto: "The Woods Way"
- Established: 1998 (28 years ago)
- CEEB code: 340649
- NCES School ID: 370005302372
- Principal: Cotton Bryan
- Faculty: 45.07 (on FTE basis)
- Grades: K–12
- Enrollment: 510 (2015–16)
- Student to teacher ratio: 11.32:1
- Colors: Green and silver
- Mascot: Wolves
- Nickname: The Wolves
- Website: www.woodscharter.org

Woods Charter School is a non-profit charter school in Chatham County, North Carolina. Founded in 1998, Woods Charter School is a North Carolina public charter school, serving approximately 500 students from kindergarten through twelfth grade. In August 2008, Woods Charter School moved to its current location.

In 2026, Woods was named "#1 in Durham, NC Metro Area High Schools" by U.S. News and World Report.

In 2026, there were 195 students in grades 9-12.

== Notable alumni ==
- Porter Robinson, electronic music producer and DJ
