= Seaforth, North Carolina =

Unincorporated community in North Carolina, US

Coordinates: 35°44′25″N 79°01′53″W

Seaforth is an unincorporated community in Chatham County, North Carolina, United States located on U.S. Highway 64. It lies at an elevation of 217 feet (66 m).
