= Carolina Meadows, North Carolina =

- Census-designated place
- Location within North Carolina Location within the United States
- Coordinates: 35°51′35″N 79°01′04″W
- Country: United States
- State: North Carolina
- County: Chatham

Area
  - Total: 0.39 sq mi (1.02 km^{2})
  - Land: 0.39 sq mi (1.02 km^{2})
  - Water: 0 sq mi (0.00 km^{2})
- Elevation: 269 ft (82 m)

Population (2020)
  - Total: 727
  - Density: 1,843.2/sq mi (711.66/km^{2})
- Time zone: UTC-5 (Eastern (EST))
  - Summer (DST): UTC-4 (EDT)
- ZIP Code: 27517 (Chapel Hill)
- Area codes: 919/984
- FIPS code: 37-10532
- GNIS feature ID: 2806989

Carolina Meadows is a planned community and census-designated place (CDP) in Chatham County, North Carolina, United States. It was first listed as a CDP in the 2020 census with a population of 727.

The community is in northern Chatham County, 5 miles (8 km) south-southeast of the center of Chapel Hill. The CDP is bordered to the north by Orange County and Durham County. State Road 1726 (Old Farrington Road) forms the southeastern border of the community, and State Route 1727 (Whippoorwill Lane) is the southwestern border. The Governors Village CDP is to the southwest, across Whippoorwill Lane.

== Demographics ==
Historical population
Census	Pop.	Note	%±
2020	727		—
U.S. Decennial Census; 2020

=== 2020 census ===
Carolina Meadows CDP, North Carolina – Demographic Profile (NH = Non-Hispanic)
Race / Ethnicity	Pop 2020	% 2020
White alone (NH)	699	96.15%
Black or African American alone (NH)	2	0.28%
Native American or Alaska Native alone (NH)	0	0.00%
Asian alone (NH)	5	0.69%
Pacific Islander alone (NH)	0	0.00%
Some Other Race alone (NH)	0	0.00%
Mixed Race/Multi-Racial (NH)	8	1.10%
Hispanic or Latino (any race)	13	1.79%
Total	727	100.00%

Note: the US Census treats Hispanic/Latino as an ethnic category. This table excludes Latinos from the racial categories and assigns them to a separate category. Hispanics/Latinos can be of any race.
