= Southwest Community Park =

Public park in North Carolina, USA

Coordinates: 35°36′52″N 79°23′38″W

Southwest Community Park is a public park in Chatham County, North Carolina in the United States, operated by the Chatham County Parks and Recreation Department.

Amenities include a softball field, multi-Purpose Field, picnic pavilion, walking trail, playground, sand volleyball court, restrooms, concession stand with kitchen, and parking.

Events include Movies in the Park and Family Fun Days.
