= 1796 North Carolina's 4th congressional district special election =

A special election was held in North Carolina's 4th congressional district on November 23, 1796, to fill a vacancy left by the resignation of Absalom Tatom (DR) on June 1, 1796. Tatom had, himself, been elected in a special election the previous year.

== Election results ==
Candidate	Party	Votes	Percent
William F. Strudwick	Federalist	264	76.3%
Richard Stanford	Democratic-Republican	78	22.5%
Scattering		4	1.2%

Strudwick took his seat on December 13, 1796

== See also ==
- List of special elections to the United States House of Representatives
