= Baldwin Township, Chatham County, North Carolina =

- Township
- Location of Baldwin Township in Chatham County

- Location of Chatham County in North Carolina
- Coordinates: 35.8397°N 79.1339°W
- Country: United States
- State: North Carolina
- County: Chatham

Area
  - Total: 45.66 sq mi (118.26 km^{2})
- Highest elevation (Terrells Mountain at the northern end of the township): 755 ft (230 m)
- Lowest elevation (Haw River where it flows out of the township in the southwest corner): 276 ft (84 m)

Population (2010)
  - Total: 7,605
  - Density: 166.56/sq mi (64.31/km^{2})
- Time zone: UTC-4 (EST)
  - Summer (DST): UTC-5 (EDT)
- Area code: 704

Baldwin Township, population 7,605, is one of thirteen townships in Chatham County, North Carolina. Baldwin Township is 45.66 square miles (118.3 km^{2}) in size and located in north-central Chatham County. Baldwin Township does not contain any municipalities within it.

== Geography ==
The Haw River forms the western boundary of Baldwin Township and its tributaries drain most of the township. These tributaries include Pokeberry Creek, Wilkinson Creek, Terrells Creek, and Collins Creek. The northeastern part of the township is drained by Price Creek and its tributary, East Price Creek.
