= Northwest District Park =

Park in North Carolina, United States

Coordinates: 35.808036°N 79.333114°W

Northwest District Park is a public park in Chatham County, North Carolina, United States, operated by the Chatham County Parks and Recreation Department.

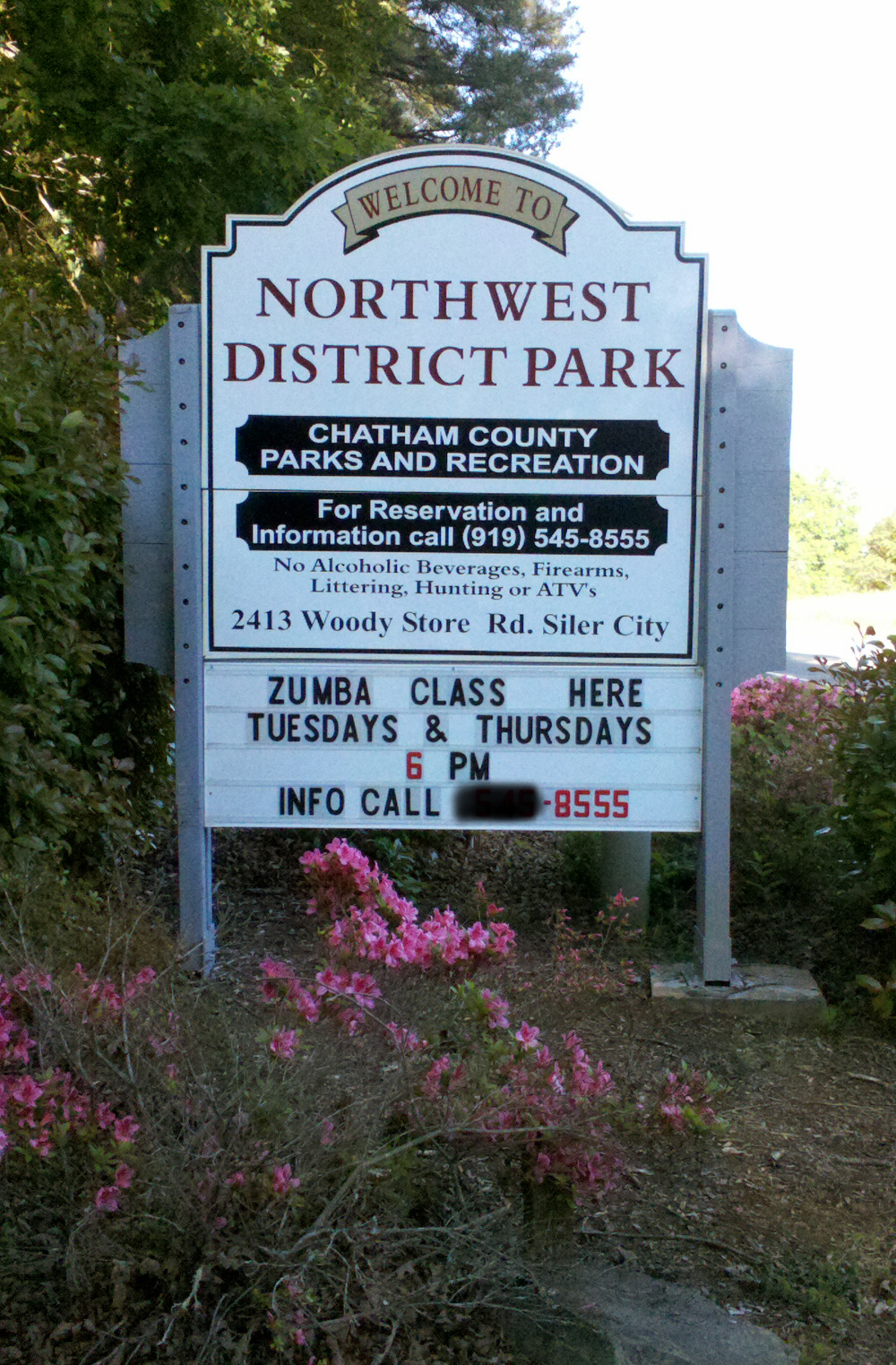
Entrance Sign

Amenities include an outdoor swimming pool, lake with rental paddle boats, multipurpose field for soccer, ultimate, football, rugby, and other field sports, youth activity building, picnic pavilions, restrooms, outdoor basketball court, reception/meeting building with lake view, playground, 1 mile walking trail, and parking.

The trail winds through mature hardwood forests.

Events include a Summer Camp: A week-long, full-day summer camp for ages 5–14, and movies in the park.

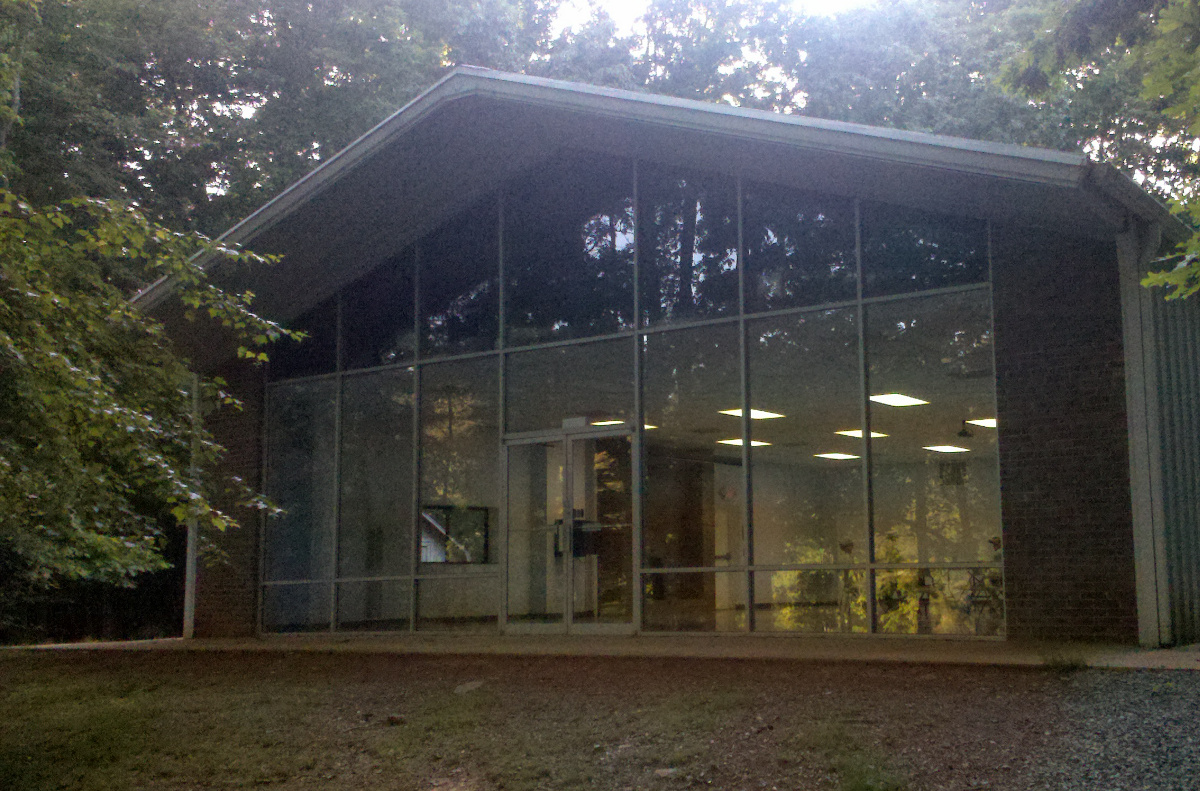
Reception/meeting building with lake view

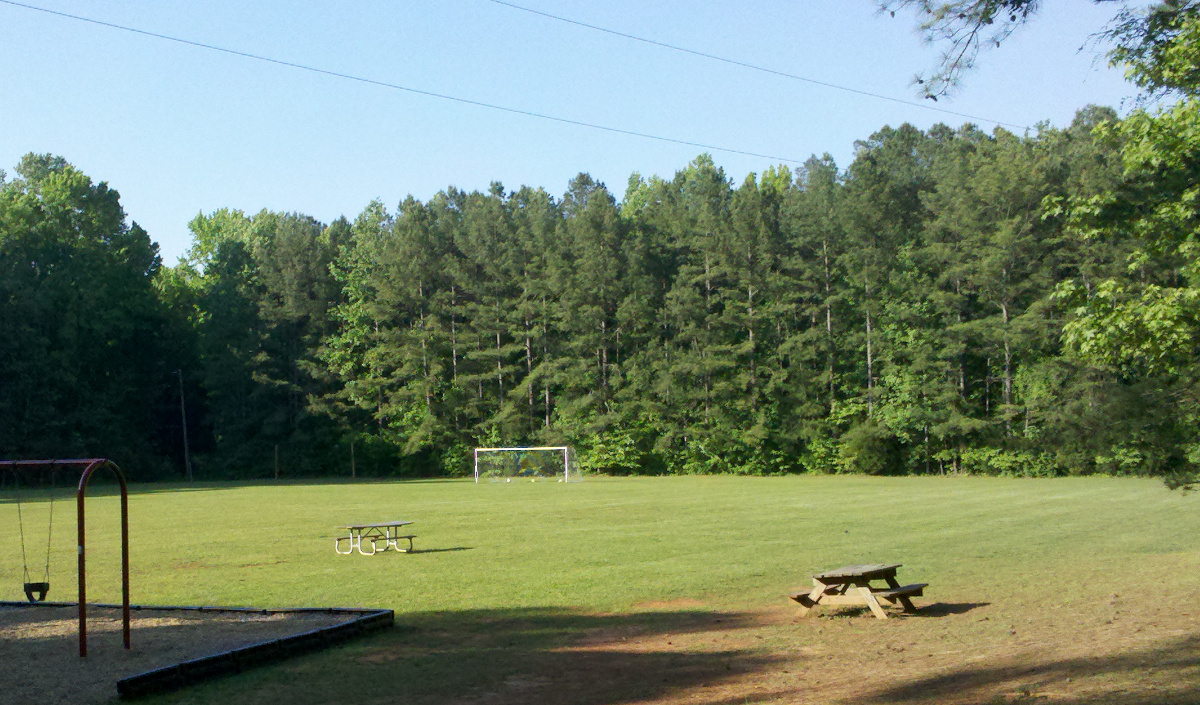
Soccer Field

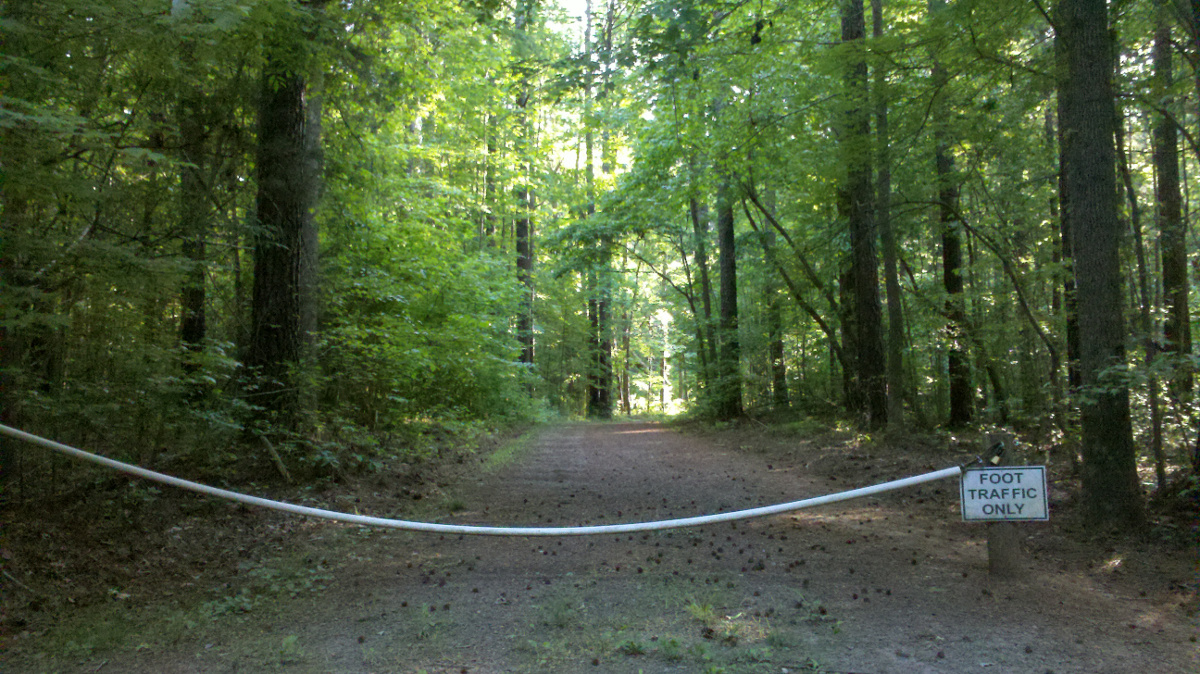
Trail Entrance

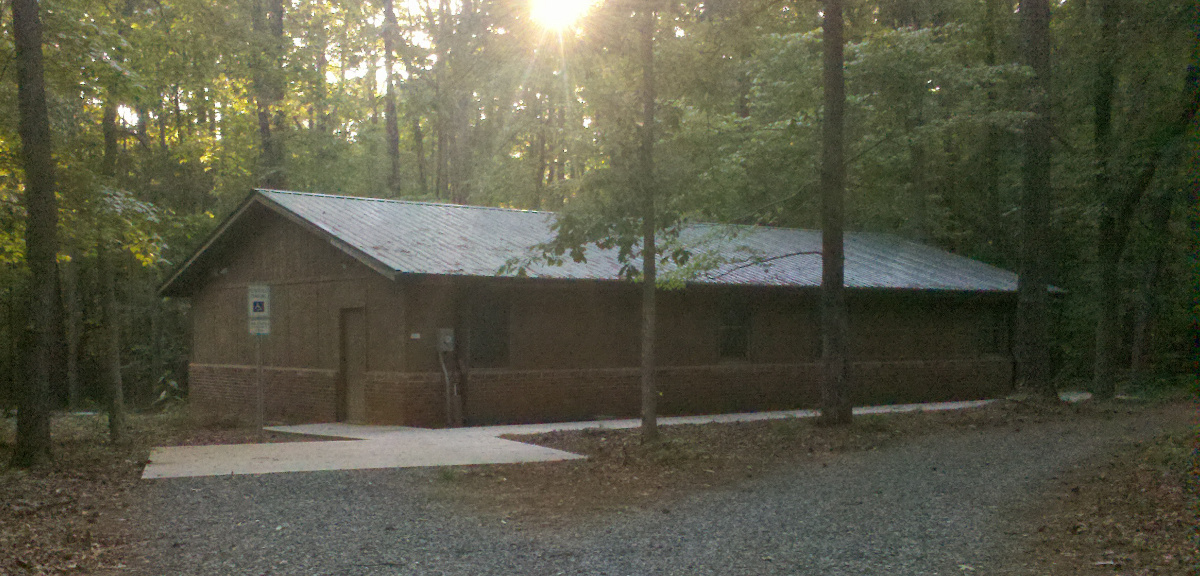
Youth Activity Room

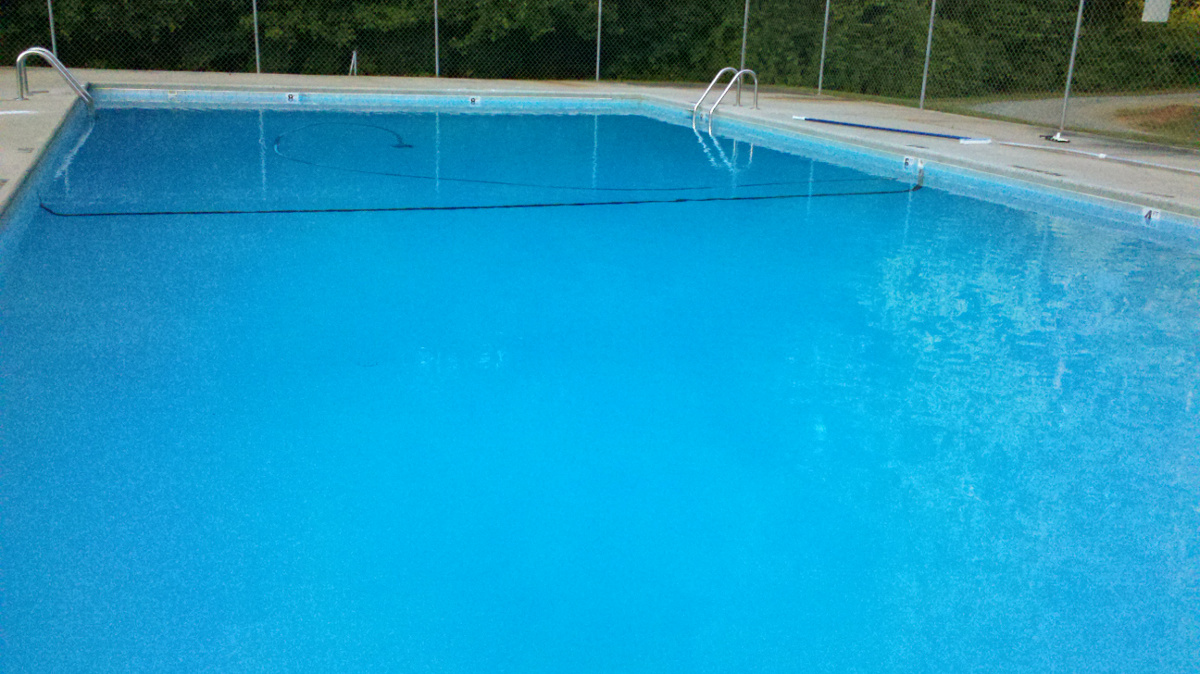
Swimming Pool

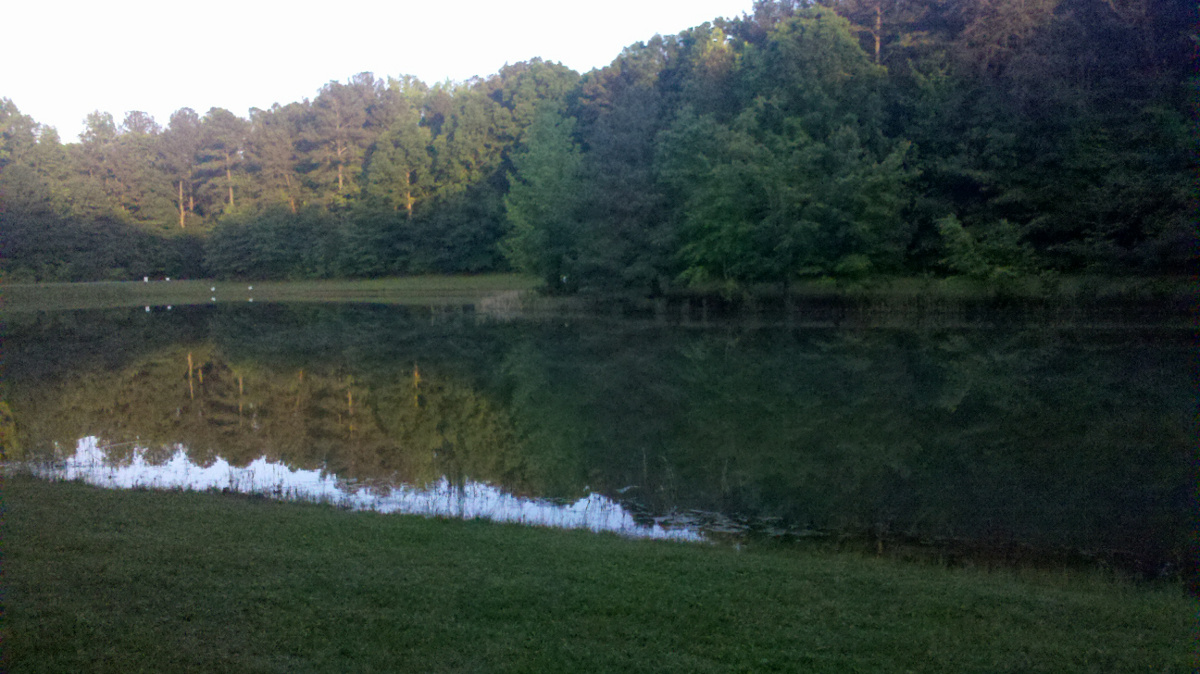
Lake

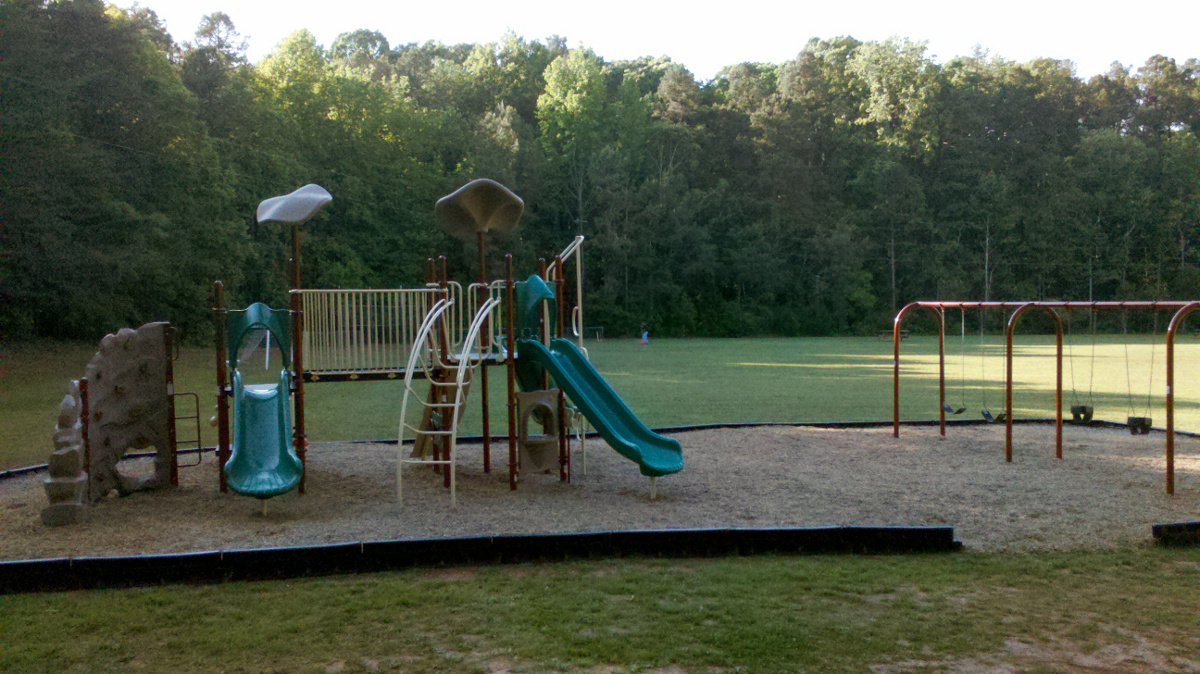
Playground

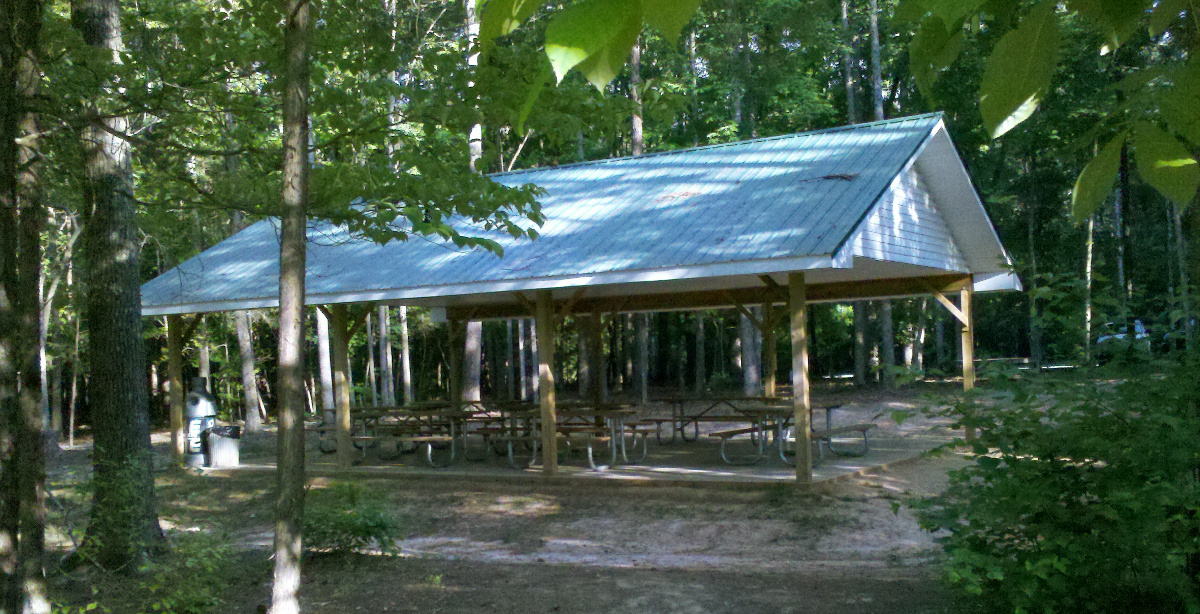
Picnic Pavilion

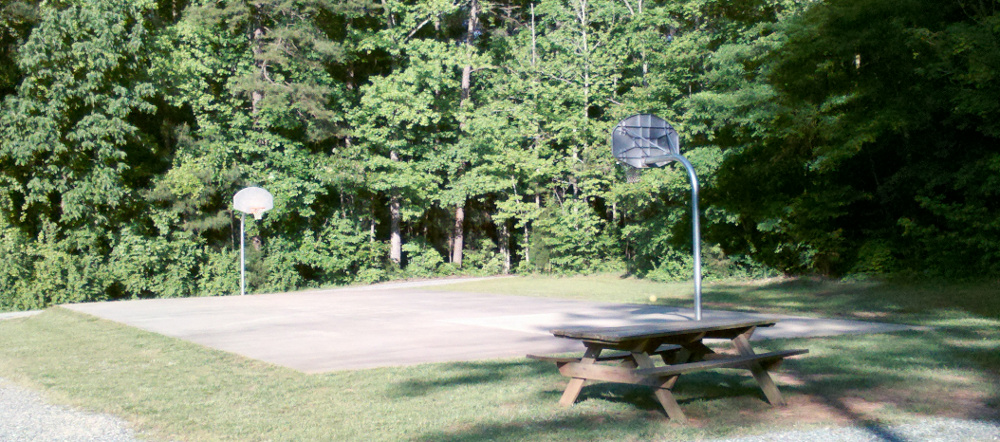
Basketball Court
