= Northeast District Park =

Public park in Chatham County, North Carolina

Coordinates: 35.80838°N 79.03215°W

Northeast District Park is a 66 acre public park in Chatham County, North Carolina in the United States, operated by the Chatham County Parks and Recreation Department.

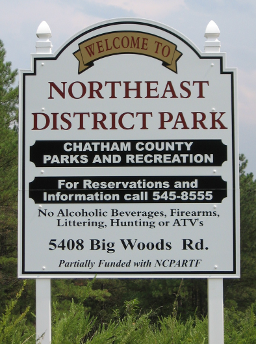
Entrance Sign

Amenities include a regulation-size baseball field with lights and bleachers, two regulation tennis courts, a multipurpose field for soccer, ultimate, football, rugby, and other field sports approximately 125 by 85 yards with bleachers (approx. 150 seats), a restroom/concession building, a picnic shelter with pond view, a playground, a 1/4-mile asphalt walking trail that loops the pond, and parking.

The pond existed as part of the farm that was on the parklands before the park was developed.

Use of firearms is forbidden in the gamelands around the park. Signs are posted to indicate that only bow hunting is allowed in this area.

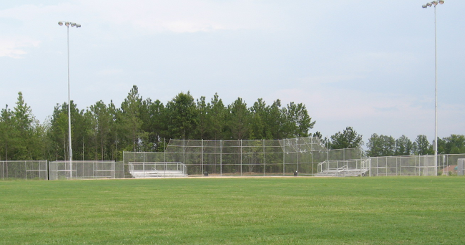
Ball Field

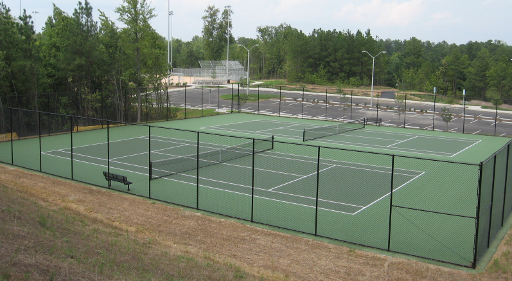
Tennis Courts

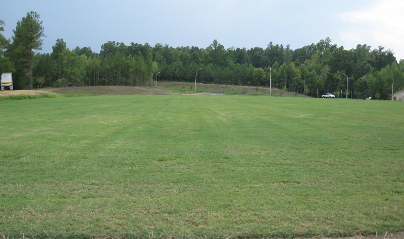
Playing Field

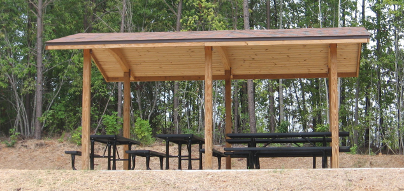
Shelter

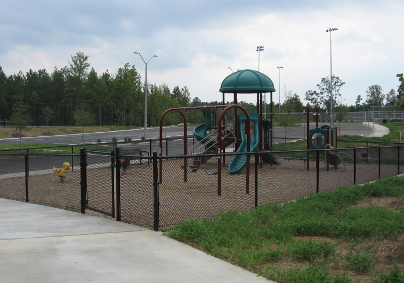
Playground
