= Brickhaven, North Carolina =

Unincorporated community in North Carolina, US

Coordinates: 35°34′30″N 79°01′44″W

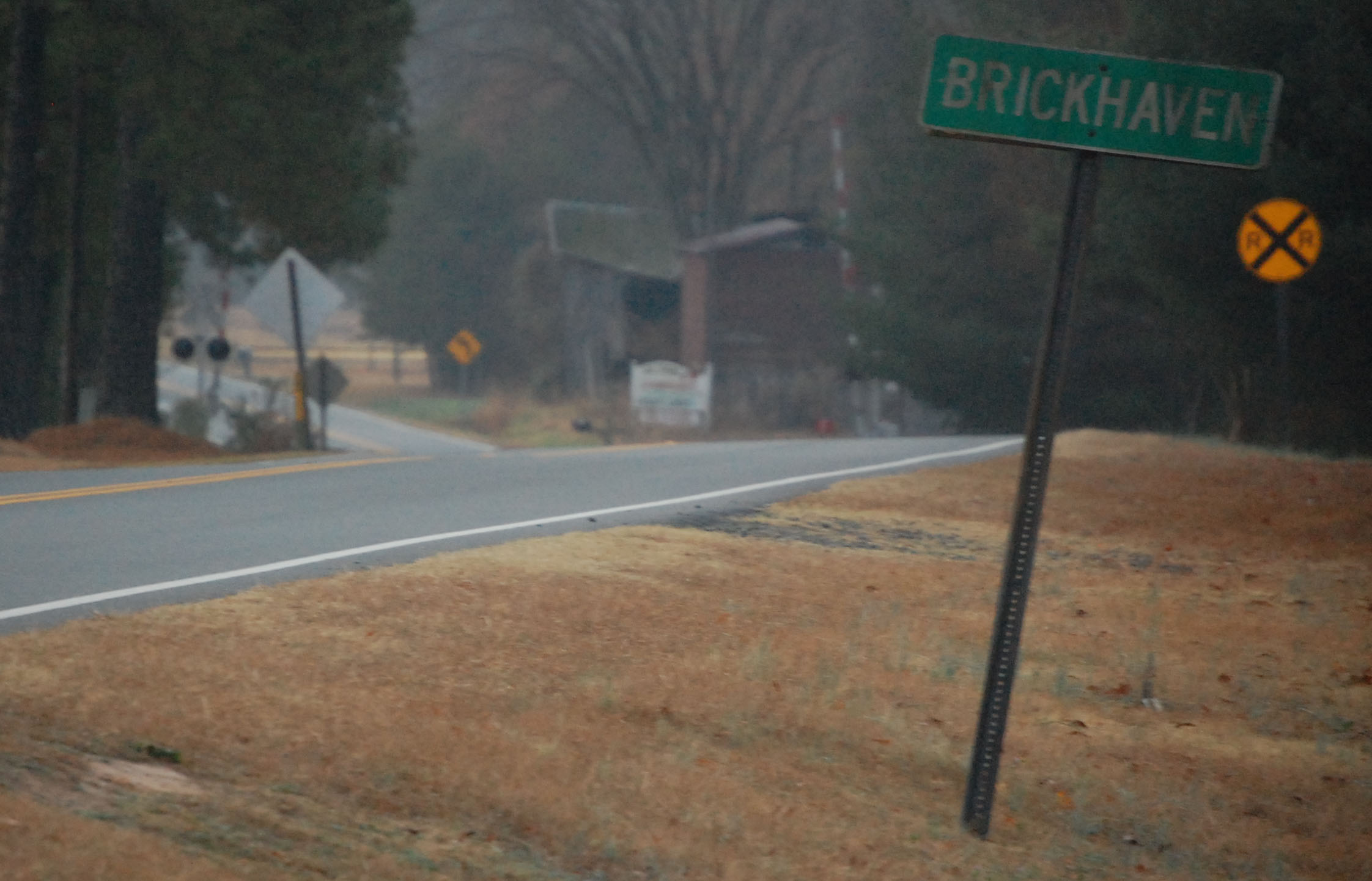
Brickhaven, North Carolina sign

Brickhaven is an unincorporated community in southeastern Chatham County, North Carolina, United States, near the Harnett County line. It is located in the panhandle of Chatham County, southeast of Moncure and is near the community of Corinth. Its name derives from the numerous brick plants and clay pits located in the community.
