= Obediah Farrar House =

Historic house in North Carolina, United States

- U.S. National Register of Historic Places
- Location within North Carolina Location within the United States
- Location: 9910 Barringer Rd., near Haywood, North Carolina
- Coordinates: 35°36′07″N 79°04′27″W
- Area: 38 acres (15 ha)
- Built: c. 1855
- Architectural style: Greek Revival
- MPS: Lee County MPS
- NRHP reference No.: 93000728
- Added to NRHP: August 18, 1993

Obediah Farrar House is a historic home located near Haywood, Lee County, North Carolina. It was built in the 1850s, and is a two-story, three-bay, mortise-and-tenon frame I-house with Greek Revival style design elements. Also on the property is the contributing road segment and landscape.

It was listed on the National Register of Historic Places in 1993.
