= 1795 North Carolina's 4th congressional district special election =

A special election was held in North Carolina's 4th congressional district on August 4, 1795, to fill a vacancy left by the death of Alexander Mebane (DR) on July 5, 1795, before the start of the 1st session of the 4th Congress.

== Election results ==
Complete results are not available, the below results are based on incomplete returns

Candidate	Party	Votes	Percent
Absalom Tatom	Democratic-Republican	66	27.7%
Ambrose Ramsey	Federalist	65	27.3%
Richard Stanford	Democratic-Republican	60	25.2%
George Roberts	Unknown	29	12.2%
William Shepard	Federalist	18	7.6%

Tatom took his seat at the start of the 4th Congress, on December 7, 1795. Tatom subsequently resigned at the end of the 1st session, on June 1, 1796 necessitating a second special election in the same district.

== See also ==
- List of special elections to the United States House of Representatives
- United States House of Representatives elections, 1794 and 1795
