= Haywood, North Carolina =

Unincorporated community in North Carolina, US

Coordinates: 35°37′13″N 79°03′50″W

Haywood is an unincorporated community in southeastern Chatham County, North Carolina, United States. It is part of the Moncure census-designated place. Along with several other unincorporated communities, it lies along the panhandle of Chatham County between Lee County and Wake County. Haywood lies at an elevation of 246 feet (75 m).

== History ==
Haywood was settled in 1796 at the Deep and Haw Rivers confluence, which marks the Cape Fear River's beginning for it was decided, Haywood was one of the sites considered in 1788 as a possible location for North Carolina's new capital, although Raleigh was ultimately chosen. Not only did the town lose the opportunity of hosting the state capital, in 1792 Haywood was also passed up as the location for what would become the University of North Carolina at Chapel Hill. During its first four years after settlement, the community was renamed twice, from Lyons to Haywoodsborough to Haywood.

The new town pinned its hopes on the shipping industry, as Haywood's location at the confluence of two rivers was suitable for an inland port. The state government gave the Cape Fear Navigation Company the right to build and operate locks on the Cape Fear River. The rivers, however, proved difficult to navigate, and by 1834 the company had lost interest in improving the river above Fayetteville. In 1852, the Cape Fear Navigation Company formally abrogated its rights to that section to the newly formed Cape Fear and Deep River Navigation Company. The Deep River Company was troubled financially and never developed a port for Haywood. The final blow to the shipping industry came with the completion of the railroad. Haywood made a critical mistake by denying trains access to the town; consequently, the railroad station would be located in Moncure, 1 mile (1.6 km) to the west.

Haywood reached its economic peak in the period before the Civil War. Reconstruction briefly brought about a racially integrated election in 1870 as well as integrated political meetings. The 20th century was marked by economic decline and the dissolution of the local government.

The Obediah Farrar House was listed on the National Register of Historic Places in 1993.
