= Governors Club, North Carolina =

- Census-designated place
- Location within North Carolina Location within the United States
- Coordinates: 35°50′37″N 79°02′43″W
- Country: United States
- State: North Carolina
- County: Chatham

Area
  - Total: 2.36 sq mi (6.10 km^{2})
  - Land: 2.36 sq mi (6.10 km^{2})
  - Water: 0 sq mi (0.00 km^{2})
- Elevation: 480 ft (150 m)

Population (2020)
  - Total: 1,969
  - Density: 836.1/sq mi (322.83/km^{2})
- Time zone: UTC-5 (Eastern (EST))
  - Summer (DST): UTC-4 (EDT)
- ZIP Code: 27517 (Chapel Hill)
- Area codes: 919/984
- FIPS code: 37-27180
- GNIS feature ID: 2812782

Governors Club is a golf course community and census-designated place (CDP) in Chatham County, North Carolina, United States. It was first listed as a CDP in the 2020 census with a population of 1,969.

The community is in northern Chatham County, 7 miles (11 km) south of Chapel Hill. It is bordered to the northeast by the Governors Village CDP. The 667-foot (203 m) summit of Edwards Mountain is in the west-central part of the Governors Club CDP.

== Demographics ==
Historical population
Census	Pop.	Note	%±
2020	1,969		—
U.S. Decennial Census; 2020

=== 2020 census ===
As of the 2020 census, Governors Club had a population of 1,969. The median age was 64.6 years. 8.0% of residents were under the age of 18 and 48.8% of residents were 65 years of age or older. For every 100 females there were 99.5 males, and for every 100 females age 18 and over there were 96.8 males age 18 and over.

100.0% of residents lived in urban areas, while 0.0% lived in rural areas.

There were 898 households in Governors Club, of which 16.7% had children under the age of 18 living in them. Of all households, 75.7% were married-couple households, 7.1% were households with a male householder and no spouse or partner present, and 14.5% were households with a female householder and no spouse or partner present. About 14.8% of all households were made up of individuals and 9.6% had someone living alone who was 65 years of age or older.

There were 971 housing units, of which 7.5% were vacant. The homeowner vacancy rate was 0.4% and the rental vacancy rate was 23.6%.

Governors Club CDP, North Carolina – Demographic Profile (NH = Non-Hispanic)
Race / Ethnicity	Pop 2020	% 2020
White alone (NH)	1,593	80.90%
Black or African American alone (NH)	110	5.59%
Native American or Alaska Native alone (NH)	1	0.05%
Asian alone (NH)	122	6.20%
Pacific Islander alone (NH)	0	0.00%
Some Other Race alone (NH)	4	0.20%
Mixed Race/Multi-Racial (NH)	45	2.29%
Hispanic or Latino (any race)	94	4.77%
Total	1,969	100.00%

Note: the US Census treats Hispanic/Latino as an ethnic category. This table excludes Latinos from the racial categories and assigns them to a separate category. Hispanics/Latinos can be of any race.
