= Briar Chapel, North Carolina =

- Census-designated place
- Location within North Carolina Location within the United States
- Coordinates: 35°49′27″N 79°07′01″W
- Country: United States
- State: North Carolina
- County: Chatham

Area
  - Total: 2.09 sq mi (5.41 km^{2})
  - Land: 2.09 sq mi (5.41 km^{2})
  - Water: 0 sq mi (0.00 km^{2})
- Elevation: 515 ft (157 m)

Population (2020)
  - Total: 5,108
  - Density: 2,443.8/sq mi (943.55/km^{2})
- Time zone: UTC-5 (Eastern (EST))
  - Summer (DST): UTC-4 (EDT)
- ZIP Code: 27516 (Chapel Hill)
- Area codes: 919/984
- FIPS code: 37-07748
- GNIS feature ID: 2812781

Briar Chapel is a planned community and census-designated place (CDP) in Chatham County, North Carolina, United States. It was first listed as a CDP in the 2020 census with a population of 5,108.

The community is in northern Chatham County, 1 mile (1.6 km) west of U.S. Routes 15 and 501. It is 8 miles (13 km) south of Chapel Hill and 9 miles (14 km) north of Pittsboro, the Chatham county seat.

== Demographics ==
Historical population
Census	Pop.	Note	%±
2020	5,108		—
U.S. Decennial Census; 2020

=== 2020 census ===
As of the 2020 census, Briar Chapel had a population of 5,108. The median age was 39.4 years. 29.1% of residents were under the age of 18 and 17.3% of residents were 65 years of age or older. For every 100 females there were 90.5 males, and for every 100 females age 18 and over there were 84.8 males age 18 and over.

98.1% of residents lived in urban areas, while 1.9% lived in rural areas.

There were 1,882 households in Briar Chapel, of which 43.2% had children under the age of 18 living in them. Of all households, 72.1% were married-couple households, 5.8% were households with a male householder and no spouse or partner present, and 18.3% were households with a female householder and no spouse or partner present. About 14.8% of all households were made up of individuals and 7.5% had someone living alone who was 65 years of age or older.

There were 1,955 housing units, of which 3.7% were vacant. The homeowner vacancy rate was 1.4% and the rental vacancy rate was 3.2%.

Briar Chapel CDP, North Carolina – Demographic Profile (NH = Non-Hispanic)
Race / Ethnicity	Pop 2020	% 2020
White alone (NH)	4,163	81.50%
Black or African American alone (NH)	160	3.13%
Native American or Alaska Native alone (NH)	17	0.33%
Asian alone (NH)	214	4.19%
Pacific Islander alone (NH)	2	0.04%
Some Other Race alone (NH)	11	0.22%
Mixed Race/Multi-Racial (NH)	275	5.38%
Hispanic or Latino (any race)	266	5.21%
Total	5,108	100.00%

Note: the US Census treats Hispanic/Latino as an ethnic category. This table excludes Latinos from the racial categories and assigns them to a separate category. Hispanics/Latinos can be of any race.
