= Chatham County, North Carolina =

County in North Carolina, U.S.

- County
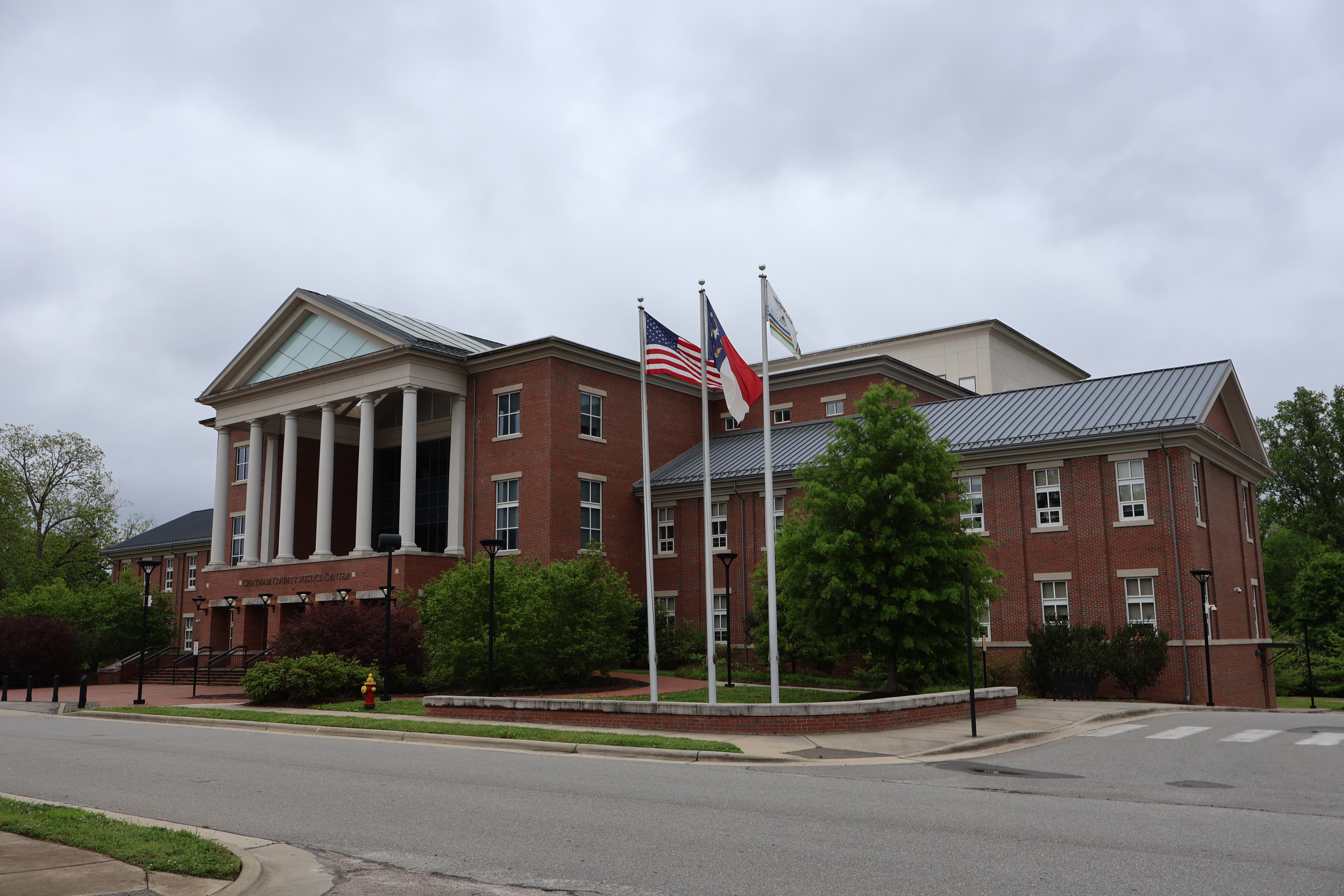
- Chatham County Courthouse in Pittsboro

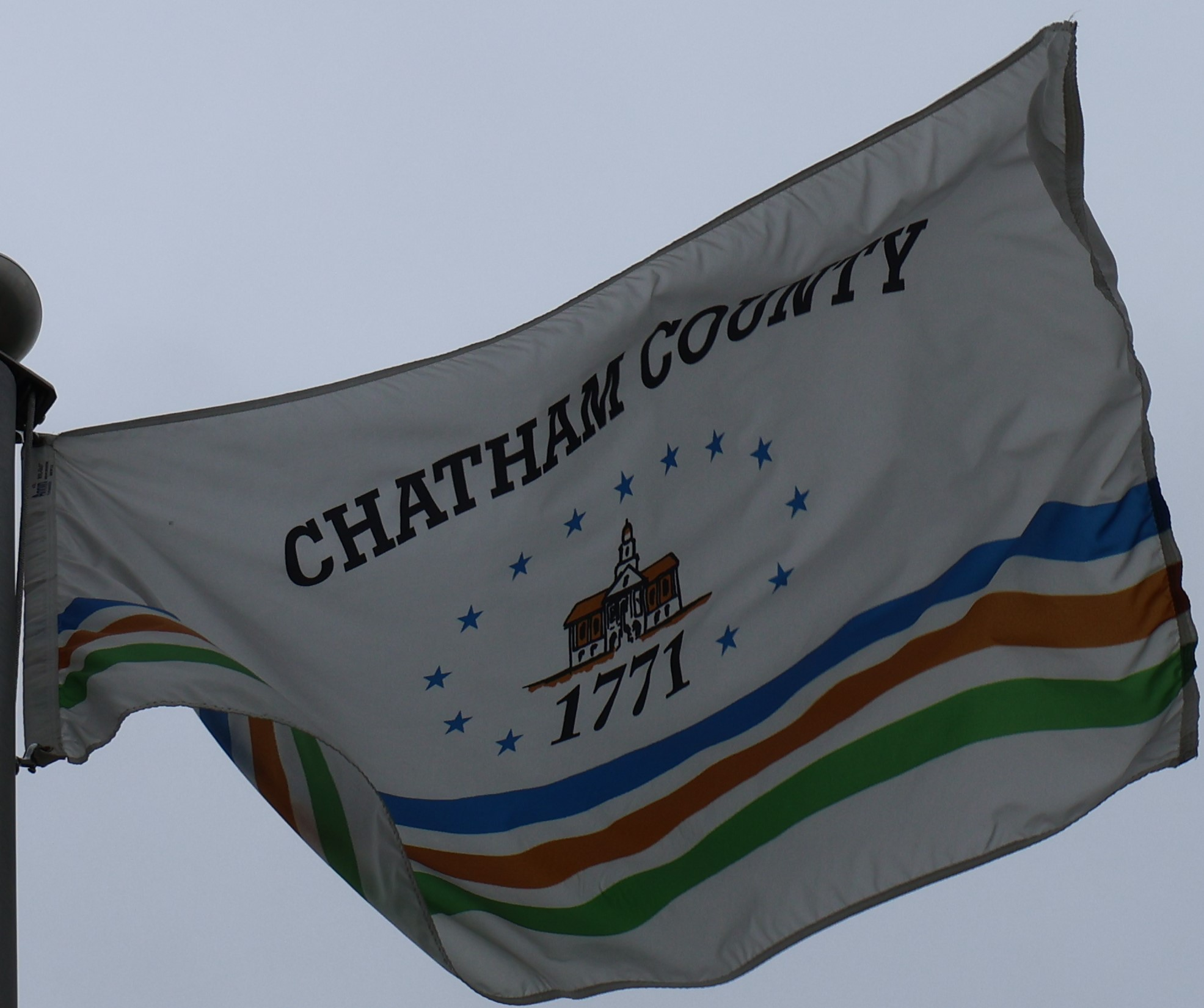
- Flag Seal Logo

- Location within the U.S. state of North Carolina
- Interactive map of Chatham County, North Carolina
- Coordinates: 35.70°N 79.25°W
- Country: United States
- State: North Carolina
- Founded: 1771
- Named for: William Pitt, 1st Earl of Chatham
- Seat: Pittsboro
- Largest community: Siler City

Area
  - Total: 708.93 sq mi (1,836.1 km^{2})
  - Land: 681.68 sq mi (1,765.5 km^{2})
  - Water: 27.25 sq mi (70.6 km^{2}) 3.84%

Population (2020)
  - Total: 76,285
  - Estimate (2025): 85,111 ▲
  - Density: 111.91/sq mi (43.21/km^{2})
- Time zone: UTC−5 (Eastern)
  - Summer (DST): UTC−4 (EDT)
- Congressional districts: 4th, 9th
- Website: www.chathamcountync.gov

Chatham County (locally /ˈtʃætəm/ CHAT-əm) is a county located in the Piedmont area of the U.S. state of North Carolina. It is also the location of the geographic center of North Carolina, northwest of Sanford. As of the 2020 census, the population was 76,285. Its county seat is Pittsboro.

Chatham County is part of the Durham-Chapel Hill, NC Metropolitan Statistical Area, which is also included in the Raleigh-Durham-Cary, NC Combined Statistical Area, which had an estimated population of 2,368,947 in 2023.

== History ==
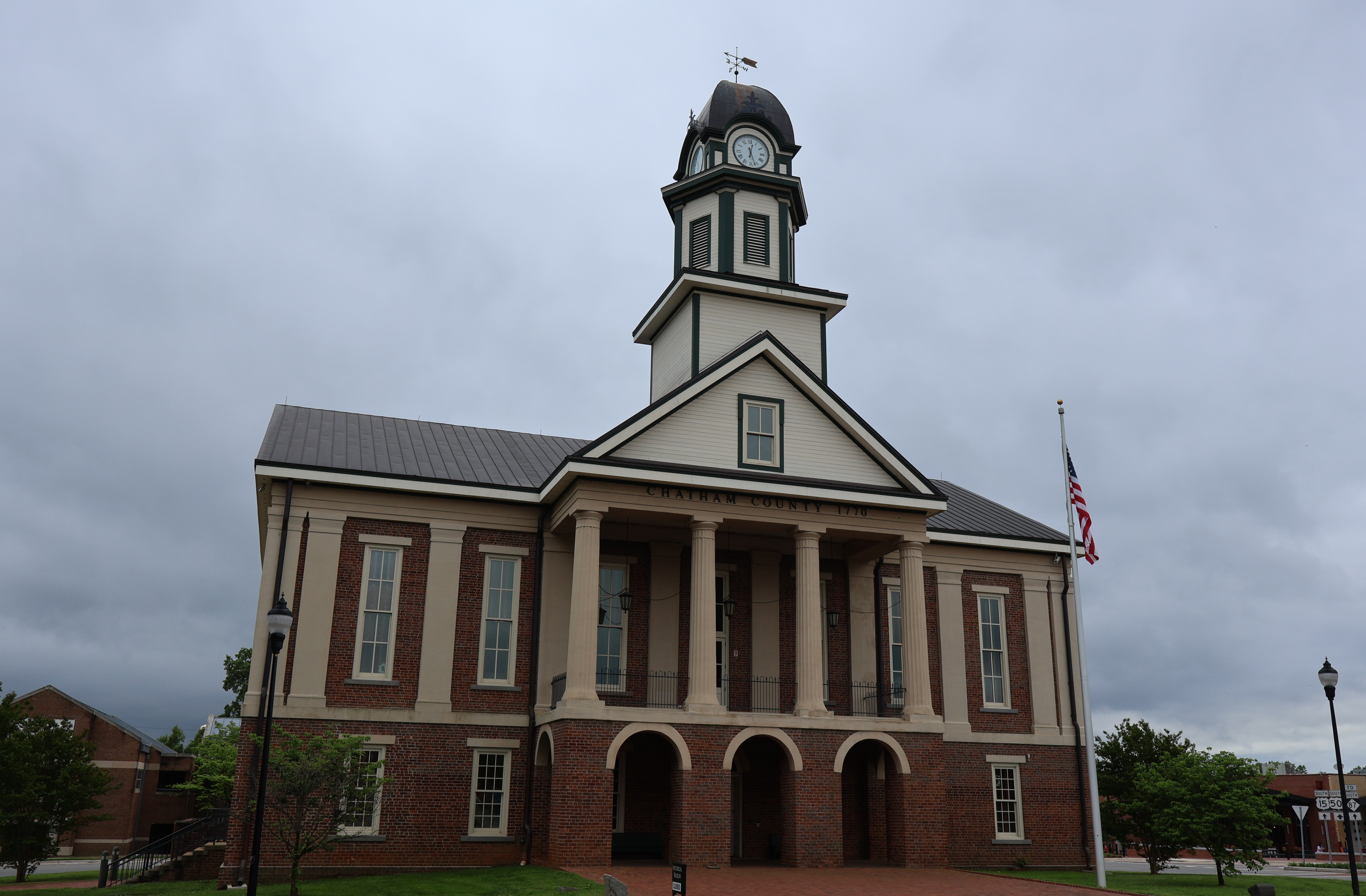
Former Chatham County Courthouse in Pittsboro

Some of the first European settlers of what would become the county were English Quakers, who settled along the Haw and Eno rivers. The county was formed in 1771 from Orange County. It had been named in 1758 for William Pitt, 1st Earl of Chatham, who served as British Prime Minister from 1766 to 1768 and opposed harsh colonial policies. In 1907, parts of Chatham County and Moore County were combined to form Lee County.

The county did not have a county seat until 1778 when Chatham Courthouse was built. It was not until 1787 that it was renamed Pittsboro. In 1781, Chatham Courthouse was located the south side of Robeson Creek, where the Horton Middle school is currently located. The Chatham Courthouse was the site of an engagement during the American Revolution on July 17, 1781. On July 16, 1781, Patriot leaders had tried and sentenced to hang several Loyalist leaders. Hearing of their fate, Loyalist leader Colonel David Fanning and his men encircled Chatham Courthouse and took 53 prisoners including Colonel Ambrose Ramsey, some local militia, and three members of the North Carolina General Assembly.

While not devoted to large plantations, the county was developed for small farms, where slave labor was integral to the owners' productivity and success. By 1860 one-third of the county population were African Americans, chiefly enslaved.

Moncure, located at the confluence of the Deep and Haw rivers forming the Cape Fear River, once served as the westernmost inland port in the state. Steamships could travel between it and the Atlantic Coast along that major river.

After the Civil War and emancipation, white violence against freedmen increased in an assertion of white supremacy and enforced dominance after emancipation. From the late 1860s secret terrorist organizations such as the Ku Klux Klan, Constitutional Union Guard, and White Brotherhood were active against blacks in the county. After Reconstruction and into the early 20th century, a total of six lynchings of African Americans were recorded here. Harriet Finch, Jerry Finch, Lee Tyson, John Pattishall on September 30, 1885. Harriet Finch is 1 of only 4 lynchings of women to occur in North Carolina. Henry Jones was lynched on January 12, 1899, after being accused of raping and murdering Nancy Welch/Welsh, a white widow in Chatham County. The sixth person to be lynched was Eugene Daniel who was hanged and then had his body riddled with bullets on September 18, 1921.

There was a notorious mass lynching of four African Americans on September 29, 1885, who were taken from the county jail in Pittsboro by a disguised mob at 1 am. The mob of 50–100 people hanged and killed Jerry Finch, his wife Harriet, and Lee Tyson, arrested for a robbery/murder. Harriet Finch was one of four black women to be lynched in the state. They also hanged John Pattishall, who was awaiting trial for two other unrelated robbery/murders. Afterward, the editor of The Chatham Record strongly condemned the lynchings. The county had the second-highest total of lynchings in the state, a number equaled by two other counties in this period.

In 1977, the county adopted a council-manager form of government and hired a county manager. On March 25, 2010, the Chatham County Courthouse, built in 1881 in the county seat of Pittsboro, caught fire while undergoing renovations. It has now been rebuilt.

=== Coal mining ===
Spanning the southern border of Chatham County, the Deep River Coal Field contains the only known potentially economic bituminous coal deposits in the state. Coal was mined here on an artisan scale in colonial times. It was commercially produced beginning from the early 1850s.

The communities of Carbonton and Cumnock (formerly called Egypt in Lee County) developed with the coal mining industry. Much of the coal mined in the field during the Civil War was used for Confederate operations.

The Coal Glen mine disaster of the 1920s, frequent flooding by the Deep River, the depth of the coal seam, and faulting of the seam sealed the fate of the mines. Production ceased in 1953.

=== Agriculture and industry ===
The county was long dependent on agriculture as the basis of the economy, and there were numerous subsistence farmers in historic times. The area's natural soil conditions (composed mostly of the hard red clay soil common to the Piedmont) did not support the cultivation of commodity cash crops such as tobacco; this was never important in the county's economy. As a result, settlers held fewer slaves than in some areas of the state, but by 1860 enslaved African Americans constituted about one-third of the county population. The production of livestock has always been more important to the county, especially the breeding of cattle and poultry.

The county once had a thriving dairy industry, but in recent years most farms have been sold and developed.

Chatham County has a deep tradition in southern music. Tommy Thompson, of the Red Clay Ramblers, and Tommy Edwards have entertained for decades with traditional, old time and bluegrass. Artists in many styles of music have emerged, from rock and roll to big band. Of late, Shakori Hills Grassroots Festival of Music and Dance hosts various styles of music. A four-day outdoor festival is held twice each year, in April and October. Shakori Hills is also the location of the Hoppin John Fiddlers Convention and Mountain Aid benefit concert.

== Geography ==
According to the U.S. Census Bureau, the county has a total area of 708.93 square miles (1,836.1 km^{2}), of which 681.68 square miles (1,765.5 km^{2}) is land and 27.25 square miles (70.6 km^{2}) (3.84%) is water.

The county lies totally within the Piedmont physiographic region. The topography of the county is generally gently rolling with several higher hills rising above the general terrain. One of these hills, Terrells Mountain, on the Orange County line is the transmitter site for several radio and TV stations for the Raleigh-Durham market, including WUNC-TV 4, WDCG (G105), WNCB (B93.9), and WUNC 91.5 FM (NC Public Radio).

The county lies within the Cape Fear River drainage basin. The Cape Fear River begins in the county near the community of Moncure, at the confluence of the Haw River and the Deep River below Jordan Lake. B. Everett Jordan Lake, a major reservoir and flood-control lake, is located within the New Hope River basin and lies mainly in eastern Chatham County. The lake is owned by the US Army Corps of Engineers and is partially leased by the state of North Carolina as Jordan Lake State Recreation Area.

Much of the eastern part of the county lies within the Triassic Basin, a subregion of the Piedmont. Much of the bedrock in the county is volcanic in origin and formed during the Triassic period (hence the name). The Triassic origins have led to the formation of coal deposits in the southern part of the county. The Boren Clay Products Pit just north of Gulf in extreme southern Chatham County is a place where Triassic flora fossils persist. The volcanic origins also led to the creation of high amounts of metamorphic-based rocks in the county. The county lies on the Carolina Slate Belt. Soils in the county are mostly clay based and have a deep red color, as do most soils in the Piedmont. Groundwater in the county is generally full of minerals and tends to be "hard" if not softened. Mineral-based water was the attraction at Mt. Vernon Springs during the latter part of the 19th century and the early part of the 20th century. A resort spa was established at the mineral springs. Visitors would drink the water in the hopes of curing ailments and diseases. The resort closed in the early 20th century and is now gone. The springs are still there and are maintained by a local church.

The county has a humid subtropical climate and experiences hot and humid summers and cold winters.

=== Water bodies ===
- B. Everett Jordan Lake
- Bear Creek
- Brush Creek
- Cape Fear River
- Deep River
- Harlands Creek
- Haw River
- Landrum Creek
- Little Brush Creek
- Loves Creek
- New Hope Creek
- Roberson Creek
- Rocky River
- Shearon Harris Reservoir
- Tick Creek
- Varnell Creek
- Wilkinson Creek

=== Adjacent counties ===
- Durham County
- Orange County
- Alamance County
- Wake County
- Harnett County
- Lee County
- Moore County
- Randolph County

== Parks and recreation ==
In addition to those mentioned below, the communities of Pittsboro, Siler City, and Goldston operate parks and other recreation facilities.

=== State parks, game land, trails, and recreation areas ===
- Chatham Game Land
- Deep River State Trail
- Harris Game Land (part)
- Jordan Game Land (part)
- Jordan Lake Educational State Forest
- Jordan Lake State Recreation Area (including Crosswinds Campground, Ebenezer Church, Parker's Creek, Poplar Point, Seaforth area, Vista Point, Robeson Creek, New Hope Overlook, and White Oak Recreation Areas)
- Lee Game Land (part)
- Lower Haw River State Natural Area
- Robeson Creek Boat Access
- Robeson Creek Paddle Access

=== County parks, trails, and recreation areas ===
- 15-501 Haw River Canoe Access
- American Tobacco Trail
- Briar Chapel Sports Park
- Bynum Beach Haw River Paddle Access
- Earl Thompson Park
- Northeast District Park
- Northwest District Park
- Southeast District Park
- Southwest Community Park
- US 64 Haw River Paddle Access

=== Other attractions ===
- Carnivore Preservation Trust
- Condoret Nature Preserve
- Crosswinds Marina
- Deep River Park and the Deep River Camelback Truss Bridge
- Irvin Nature Preserve
- La Grange Riparian Reserve
- McIver Landing
- New Hope Valley Railway
- Shakori Hills Grassroots Festival
- White Pines Nature Preserve (part)
- Wood's Mill Bend

== Demographics ==
Historical population
Census	Pop.	Note	%±
1790	9,161		—
1800	11,861		29.5%
1810	12,977		9.4%
1820	12,661		−2.4%
1830	15,405		21.7%
1840	16,242		5.4%
1850	18,449		13.6%
1860	19,101		3.5%
1870	19,723		3.3%
1880	23,453		18.9%
1890	25,413		8.4%
1900	23,912		−5.9%
1910	22,635		−5.3%
1920	23,814		5.2%
1930	24,177		1.5%
1940	24,726		2.3%
1950	25,392		2.7%
1960	26,785		5.5%
1970	29,554		10.3%
1980	33,415		13.1%
1990	38,759		16.0%
2000	49,329		27.3%
2010	63,505		28.7%
2020	76,285		20.1%
2025 (est.)	85,111	▲	11.6%
U.S. Decennial Census; 1790–1960 1900–1990; 1990–2000 2010 2020

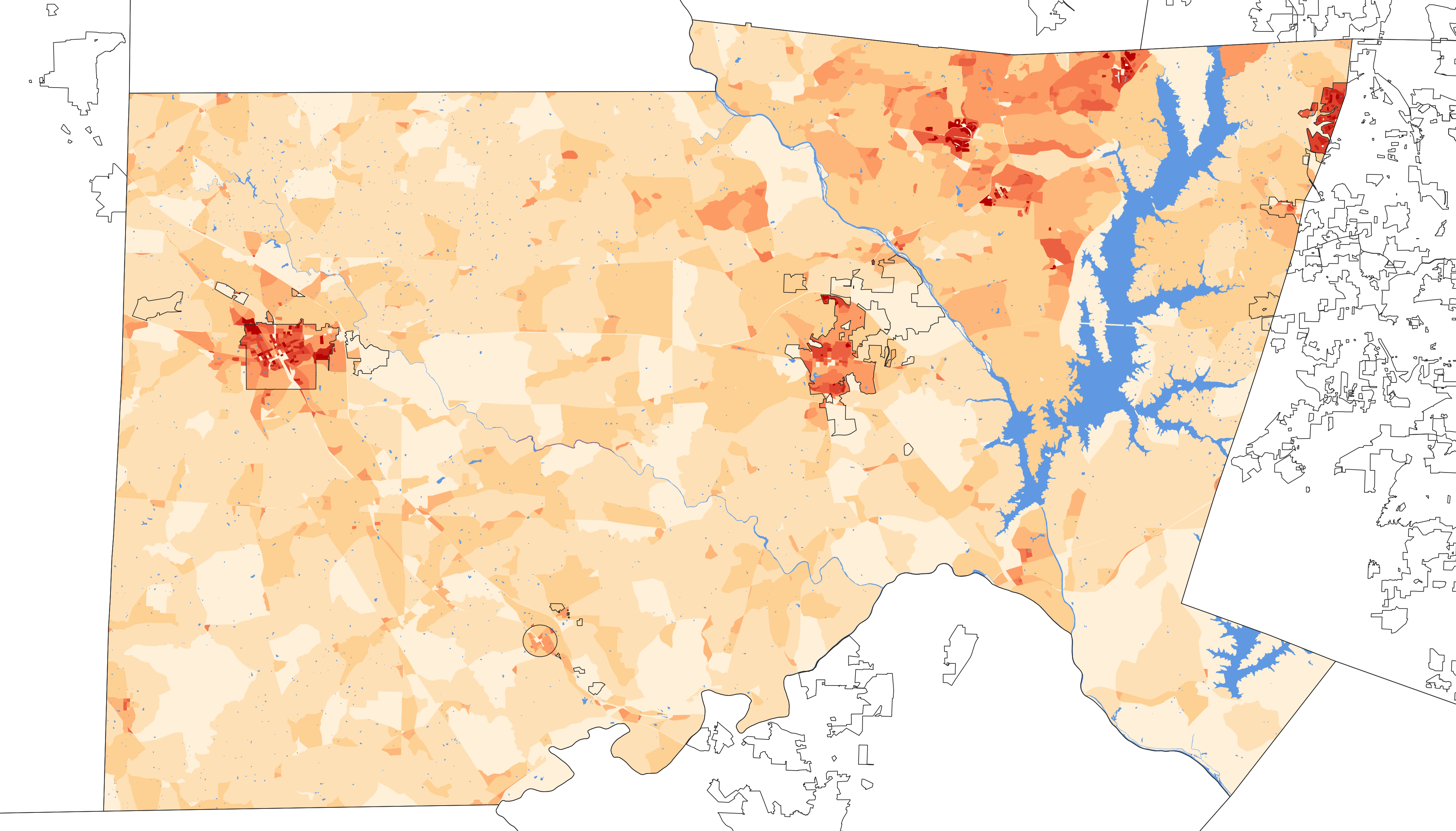
2020 population density of Chatham County NC by census block

=== Racial and ethnic composition ===
Chatham County, North Carolina – Racial and ethnic composition Note: the US Census treats Hispanic/Latino as an ethnic category. This table excludes Latinos from the racial categories and assigns them to a separate category. Hispanics/Latinos may be of any race.
Race / Ethnicity (NH = Non-Hispanic)	Pop 1980	Pop 1990	Pop 2000	Pop 2010	Pop 2020	% 1980	% 1990	% 2000	% 2010	% 2020
White alone (NH)	24,158	29,194	35,322	45,185	53,087	72.30%	75.32%	71.60%	71.15%	69.59%
Black or African American alone (NH)	8,908	8,794	8,355	8,272	7,768	26.66%	22.69%	16.94%	13.03%	10.18%
Native American or Alaska Native alone (NH)	32	123	158	163	173	0.10%	0.32%	0.32%	0.26%	0.23%
Asian alone (NH)	35	68	286	694	1,616	0.10%	0.18%	0.58%	1.09%	2.12%
Native Hawaiian or Pacific Islander alone (NH)	x	x	11	15	24	x	x	0.02%	0.02%	0.03%
Other race alone (NH)	16	16	52	129	308	0.05%	0.04%	0.11%	0.20%	0.40%
Mixed race or Multiracial (NH)	x	x	402	819	2,937	x	x	0.81%	1.29%	3.85%
Hispanic or Latino (any race)	266	564	4,743	8,228	10,372	0.80%	1.46%	9.62%	12.96%	13.60%
Total	33,415	38,759	49,329	63,505	76,285	100.00%	100.00%	100.00%	100.00%	100.00%

=== 2020 census ===
As of the 2020 census, there were 76,285 people, 31,288 households, and 21,406 families residing in the county.

The median age was 48.0 years. 20.3% of residents were under the age of 18 and 25.4% of residents were 65 years of age or older. For every 100 females there were 92.2 males, and for every 100 females age 18 and over there were 89.7 males age 18 and over.

The racial makeup of the county was 71.4% White, 10.4% Black or African American, 0.6% American Indian and Alaska Native, 2.1% Asian, <0.1% Native Hawaiian and Pacific Islander, 8.3% from some other race, and 7.2% from two or more races. Hispanic or Latino residents of any race comprised 13.6% of the population.

36.0% of residents lived in urban areas, while 64.0% lived in rural areas.

There were 31,288 households in the county, of which 27.0% had children under the age of 18 living in them. Of all households, 55.9% were married-couple households, 14.2% were households with a male householder and no spouse or partner present, and 25.0% were households with a female householder and no spouse or partner present. About 25.8% of all households were made up of individuals and 14.5% had someone living alone who was 65 years of age or older.

There were 33,947 housing units, of which 7.8% were vacant. Among occupied housing units, 79.0% were owner-occupied and 21.0% were renter-occupied. The homeowner vacancy rate was 1.2% and the rental vacancy rate was 5.6%.

Chatham County has seen a rapidly growing Hispanic population, exceeding the Black population in the 2020 census. The largest community entirely in the county, Siler City, reported a 53 percent Hispanic population, making it the first ever recorded Hispanic majority municipality in North Carolina.

=== 2010 census ===
At the 2010 census, there were 63,505 people and 24,877 households residing in the county. The population density was 93.1 people per square mile (35.9 people/km^{2}). There were 28,753 housing units at an average density of 39 units per square mile (15 units/km^{2}). The racial makeup of the county was 76.0% White, 13.2% Black or African American, 0.5% Native American, 1.1% Asian, 0.0% Pacific Islander, 7.1% from other races, and 1.9% from two or more races. 13.0% of the population were Hispanic or Latino of any race.

The median income for a household in the county was $56,038. The per capita income for the county was $29,991. About 12.2% of the population were below the poverty line.

=== 2000 census ===
In 2000, there were 19,741 households, out of which 28.8% had children under the age of 18 living with them, 56.3% were married couples living together, 10.00% had a female householder with no husband present, and 29.8% were non-families. 24.5% of all households were made up of individuals, and 10.0% had someone living alone who was 65 years of age or older. The average household size was 2.47 and the average family size was 2.91.

In 2000, the age distribution of the county was 22.5% under the age of 18, 7.3% from 18 to 24, 30.4% from 25 to 44, 24.6% from 45 to 64, and 15.3% who were 65 years of age or older. The median age was 39 years. For every 100 females there were 96.8 males. For every 100 females age 18 and over, there were 93.8 males.

A census tract within the county containing two affluent retirement communities had the highest average lifespan in the United States—97.5 years—according to data provided by the National Center for Health Statistics.

== Government and politics ==
=== Government ===
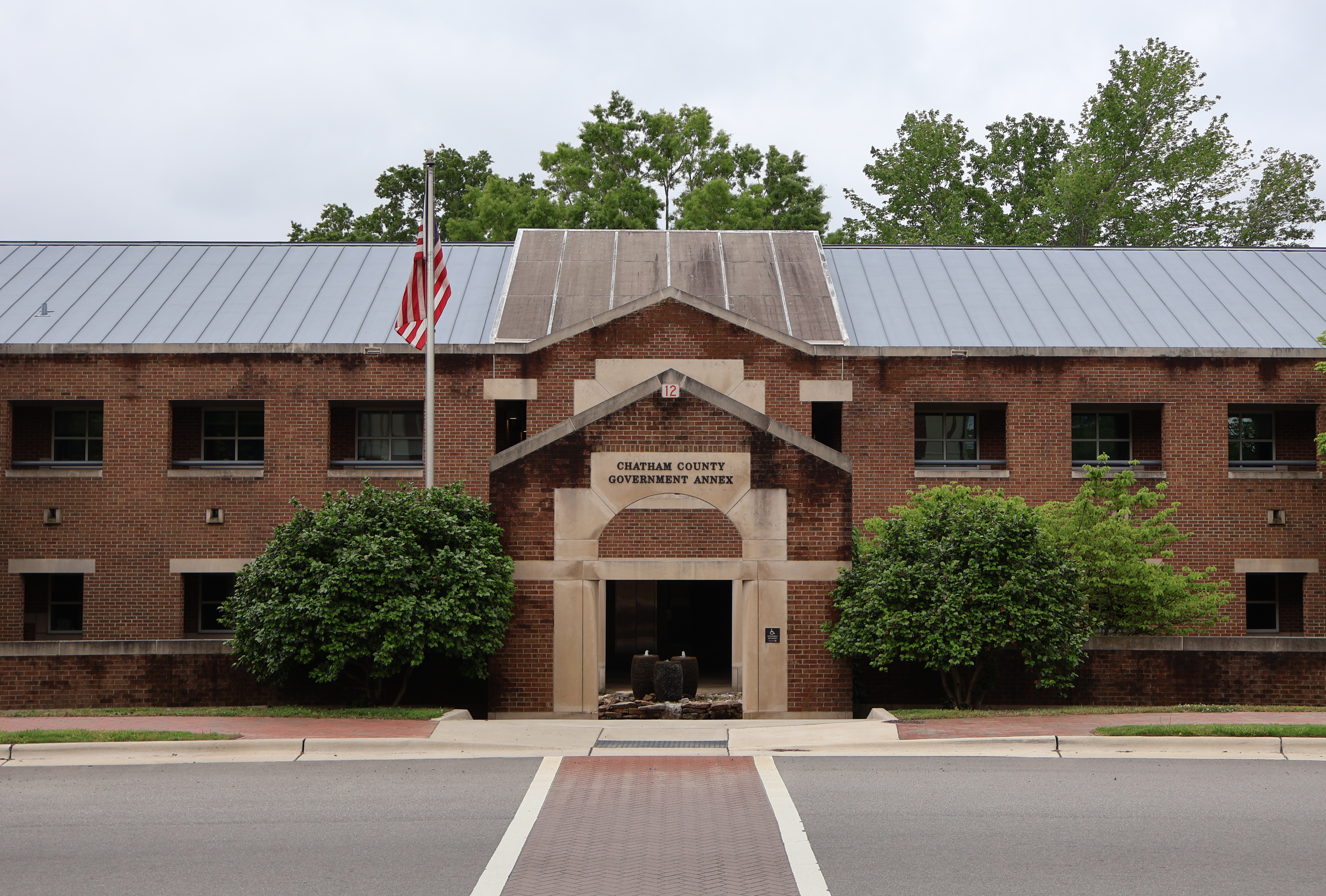
Chatham County Government Annex in Pittsboro

A five-member Board of Commissioners governs Chatham County. The commissioners are elected at large, but must reside within a particular district. Members of the Chatham County Board of Commissioners are elected for four-year terms, but the terms are staggered so that all five seats are not up for election at the same time. The board appoints a clerk, county manager, county attorney, and county tax administrator. The county manager oversees the regular operation of the county government's administration.

Chatham County is a member of the Central Pines Regional Council.

Chatham County lies within the bounds of North Carolina's 18th Prosecutorial District, the 18th Superior Court District, and the 18th District Court District.

=== Politics ===
United States presidential election results for Chatham County, North Carolina
Year	Republican		Democratic		Third party(ies)	
Year	No.	%	No.	%	No.	%
1912	70	2.28%	1,652	53.86%	1,345	43.85%
1916	1,501	44.75%	1,839	54.83%	14	0.42%
1920	2,906	47.70%	3,186	52.30%	0	0.00%
1924	2,755	44.32%	3,446	55.44%	15	0.24%
1928	3,318	55.32%	2,680	44.68%	0	0.00%
1932	2,590	37.47%	4,263	61.68%	59	0.85%
1936	2,182	33.29%	4,373	66.71%	0	0.00%
1940	1,829	31.24%	4,025	68.76%	0	0.00%
1944	2,431	38.67%	3,856	61.33%	0	0.00%
1948	2,008	34.65%	3,396	58.60%	391	6.75%
1952	3,606	45.59%	4,303	54.41%	0	0.00%
1956	3,729	47.32%	4,151	52.68%	0	0.00%
1960	4,308	47.91%	4,683	52.09%	0	0.00%
1964	4,111	43.71%	5,295	56.29%	0	0.00%
1968	3,845	36.22%	3,532	33.27%	3,239	30.51%
1972	6,175	62.12%	3,624	36.46%	142	1.43%
1976	4,279	39.90%	6,397	59.65%	49	0.46%
1980	5,414	41.00%	7,144	54.10%	647	4.90%
1984	8,595	53.39%	7,458	46.33%	46	0.29%
1988	6,999	47.81%	7,600	51.92%	40	0.27%
1992	6,568	35.36%	9,520	51.25%	2,489	13.40%
1996	7,731	42.03%	9,353	50.84%	1,312	7.13%
2000	10,248	48.96%	10,461	49.98%	222	1.06%
2004	12,892	49.73%	12,897	49.75%	133	0.51%
2008	14,668	44.61%	17,862	54.32%	350	1.06%
2012	16,665	47.03%	18,361	51.82%	408	1.15%
2016	17,105	42.92%	21,065	52.86%	1,679	4.21%
2020	21,186	43.59%	26,787	55.12%	626	1.29%
2024	22,507	43.03%	29,014	55.48%	780	1.49%

At a presidential level, Chatham County leans Democratic: no Republican presidential nominee has carried Chatham County since Ronald Reagan's 1984 landslide, although John Kerry came within six votes of losing the county in 2004, and no candidate from either major party has obtained less than 35 percent of the county's vote since the three-way 1968 election when Richard Nixon managed to carry the county with merely 36.2% of the vote. Before 1960, Chatham was basically a typical "Solid South" county, only voting Republican in 1928 due to opposition to Al Smith's Roman Catholic faith, and in 1900 – although in 1892, it was one of three counties in the state to give a plurality of its ballots to Populist James B. Weaver, the others being Nash and Sampson Counties.

In 2022, local and state elections Chatham County favored Democratic candidates. The county is represented in the North Carolina Senate by Democrat Natalie Murdock in the 20th district and in the North Carolina House of Representatives by Democrat Robert Reives in the 54th district.

== Economy ==
The county is one of the state leaders in the poultry industry. Forage crops such as hay are also grown in large quantities in the county. Carolina Farm Stewardship Association has been housed in Chatham County, along with many organic agriculture farmers, including Councilman Farms and Phillips Dairy Farms.

Industrial growth in the county has been focused around the Siler City and Moncure areas of the county, with Moncure dominating. Companies in that area include, Progress Energy, Boise Cascade, Honeywell, and Arauco. Brick manufacturing, which makes use of the local red clay soil, has been an important economic factor in the Moncure area, with several brick plants operating there and in Brickhaven.

3M operates a greenstone mine south of Pittsboro along US 15-501. Greenstone is processed to manufacture roofing-shingle granules. In 2007, residents opposed to industrialization successfully blocked a similar quarry from being developed in the western part of the county.

Manufacturing investments by the private sector, local government and federal incentives have led to new jobs in the computer chip sector and electric vehicles. By the end of 2024, the new Wolfspeed factory will begin production of silicon carbide wafers for computer chips, which will create up to 1,800 new jobs.

== Education ==
Chatham County contributes funds to, but does not govern, K-12 public education and the community college system. The Chatham County School System is governed by its own elected board. There are four public high schools: Seaforth in Pittsboro, Northwood in Pittsboro, Jordan-Matthews in Siler City, and Chatham Central in Bear Creek.

Chatham is home to three charter schools – Woods Charter School, Chatham Charter High School, and Willow Oak Montessori Charter School.

Woods Charter School is a grade K-12 public school. The school moved into a new fully equipped building on 160 Woodland Grove Lane outside Pittsboro in August 2008. Woods ranked "top ten" on SAT scores in North Carolina.

Chatham Charter High School is a grade K-12 public school. The school is located on 2200 Hamp Stone Road in Siler City, NC.

Willow Oak Montessori Charter School is a tuition-free public school located in Central Chatham County, that currently serves children in grades 1 through 8.

Central Carolina Community College, which has two campuses in the county, is governed by its own appointed Board of Trustees.

Generally, county resources provide only part of the total funding for K-12 and community colleges, but the county devotes a considerable amount of its resources to public education. In fiscal year 2007–08, more than 39% of the county's tax dollars went to education.

According to the N.C. Association of County Commissioners Annual Tax and Budget Survey for fiscal year 2006–07, the county ranked 11th in the state in total spending per student and fifth in the percent of the current expense/general funds spent on schools per student. The county also was 14th in overall education resources per capita during fiscal year 06–07.

== Transportation ==
Chatham County has managed to retain its rural character in part because it is not served by an Interstate Highway. However, Chatham County plays an important role in regional transportation due to its close proximity to the geographic center of North Carolina and to major cities such as Raleigh, Durham and Greensboro. Though driving is the dominant mode due to the county's rural nature, residents enjoy a number of transportation options.

=== Major highways ===
- Future I-685
- US 1
- US 15
- US 64
- US 64 Bus.
- US 421
- US 501
- NC 22
- NC 42
- NC 87
- NC 751
- NC 902

The main east–west artery serving Chatham County is U.S. 64, which provides access to Siler City and Pittsboro. U.S. Routes 421 and 15–501 run in a north–south direction through the county; U.S. 421 serves Siler City and U.S. 15–501 serves Pittsboro. During the 1990s and early 2000s, the NCDOT invested more than one hundred million dollars upgrading U.S. 64, U.S. 421 and U.S. 15–501, which had previously been two-lane roads, to multi-lane highways. There is now a U.S. 64 bypass north of Pittsboro; a similar freeway diverts traffic on U.S. 421 east of Siler City.

=== Transit ===
Chatham County is served by two public transit providers – Chatham Transit Network and Chapel Hill Transit. Chatham Transit Network (CTN) is the Community Transportation Program for Chatham County, providing fixed route and human service transportation. CTN's fixed route provides weekday service between Siler City, Pittsboro and Chapel Hill.

Chatham County provides many scenic bike routes along the county's rural highways. The American Tobacco Trail also traverses the northeast corner of the county.

Nearby Raleigh–Durham International Airport (RDU) serves Chatham County. Siler City Municipal Airport (5W8) is located 3 miles (4.8 km) southwest of downtown Siler City. This public access airport is home to several single and multiengine airplanes.

The county is served by both Norfolk Southern Railway and CSX Transportation. Norfolk Southern serves Siler City, Bonlee, Bear Creek, and Goldston as a part of a spur line that runs between Greensboro and Sanford. CSX serves the Moncure area on trackage that runs between Raleigh and Hamlet.

== Healthcare ==
UNC Health runs Chatham Hospital in Siler City and several other specialized clinics in the county.

== Media ==
=== Newspapers ===
- Chatham County Events (online events calendar, blog, web series, business directory, summer camp guide, and park and playground map)
- The Chatham County News
- Chatham Journal (weekly, based in Pittsboro)
- The Chatham News (weekly, based in Siler City)
- The Chatham Record (weekly, based Pittsboro)
- Chatham County Line (published 10 times annually)

=== Television ===
- WTVD (ABC affiliate)
- WRAL-TV (NBC affiliate)
- WGHP (FOX affiliate) High Point
- WNCN (CBS affiliate) Raleigh-Durham
- WFMY (CBS affiliate) Greensboro
- WRAZ (FOX affiliate) Raleigh-Durham
- WLFL (CW affiliate)
- WRDC (MyNetwork affiliate)
- WUNC (PBS affiliate)
- WUVC (Univision affiliate – Spanish language)
- WRPX (ION affiliate)

== Communities ==
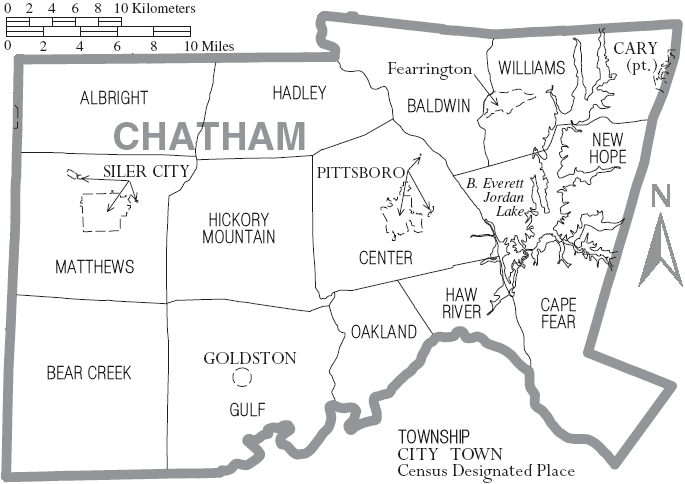
Map of Chatham County with municipal and township labels

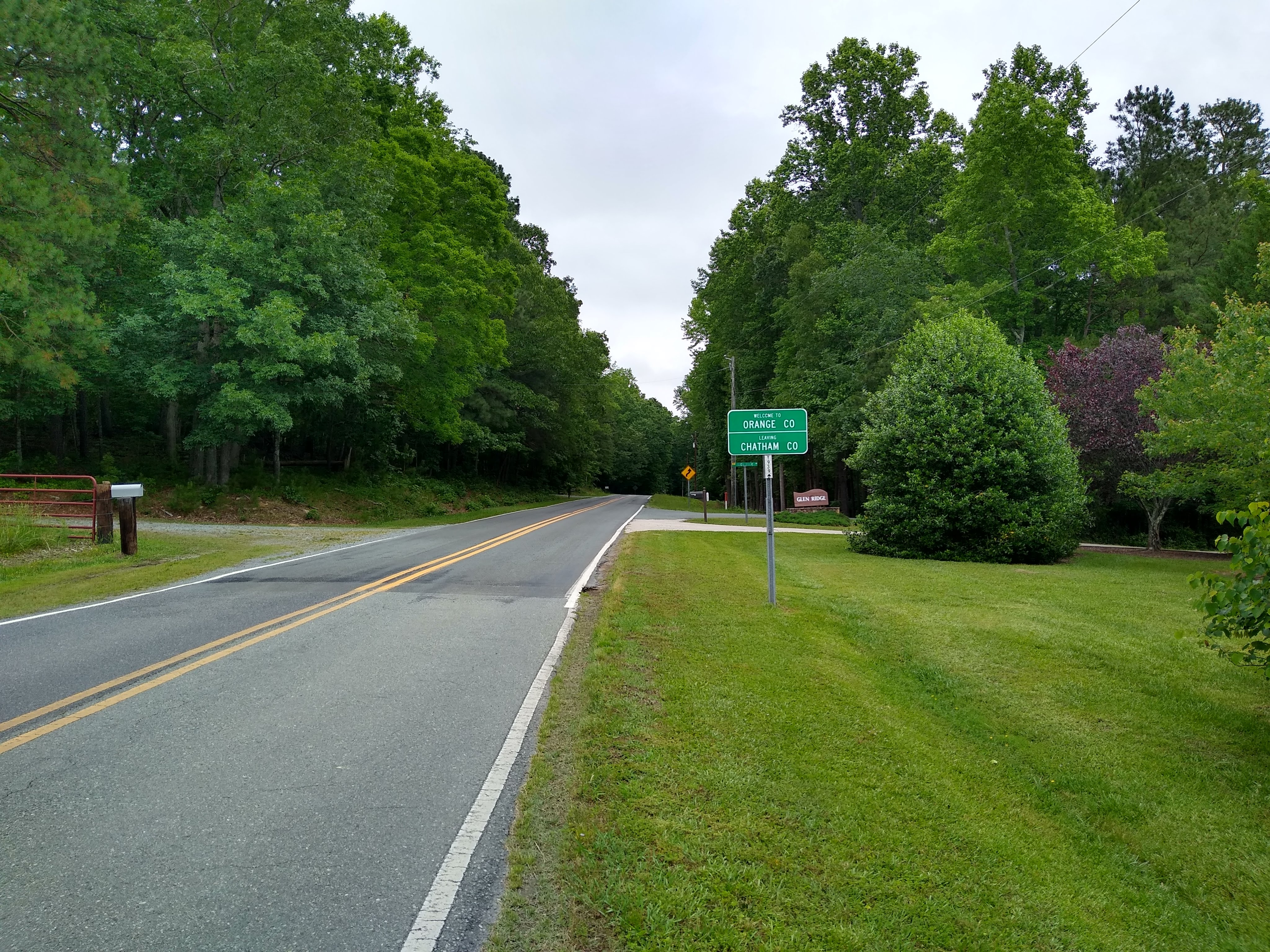
The county line between Chatham and Orange Counties

=== Towns ===
- Cary (mostly in Wake County)
- Goldston
- Pittsboro (county seat)
- Siler City (largest community)

=== Townships ===
- Albright
- Baldwin
- Bear Creek
- Cape Fear
- Center
- Gulf
- Hadley
- Haw River
- Hickory Mountain
- Matthews
- New Hope
- Oakland
- Williams

=== Census-designated places ===
- Bennett
- Briar Chapel
- Carolina Meadows
- Fearrington Village
- Governors Club
- Governors Village
- Gulf
- Moncure

=== Unincorporated communities ===
- Asbury
- Bear Creek
- Bells
- Bonlee
- Brickhaven
- Bynum
- Carbonton
- Corinth
- Crutchfield Crossroads
- Farmville
- Farrington
- Harper's Crossroads
- Haywood
- Lockville
- Seaforth
- Silk Hope
- Wilsonville

== See also ==
- List of counties in North Carolina
- National Register of Historic Places listings in Chatham County, North Carolina
- Haw River Valley AVA, wine region partially located in the county

== Works cited ==
- "Negro Is Lynched By Mob Near Pittsboro". Hickory Daily Record. Hickory, Catawba, North Carolina: Samuel Howard Farabee and Jacob Carlyle Miller. 2021. p. 6. ISSN 1061-5628. OCLC 13340814.
- The New York Times (October 5, 1919). "For Action on Race Riot Peril". The New York Times. New York. ISSN 1553-8095. OCLC 1645522.
- "Lynching at Pittsboro". Rockingham Post-Dispatch. Rockingham, Richmond, North Carolina: Isaac Spencer London. 2021. p. 12. ISSN 2376-0168. OCLC 24789326.
