= Governors Village, North Carolina =

- Census-designated place
- Location within North Carolina Location within the United States
- Coordinates: 35°51′07″N 79°01′33″W
- Country: United States
- State: North Carolina
- County: Chatham

Area
  - Total: 0.45 sq mi (1.17 km^{2})
  - Land: 0.44 sq mi (1.15 km^{2})
  - Water: 0.0077 sq mi (0.02 km^{2})
- Elevation: 269 ft (82 m)

Population (2020)
  - Total: 1,512
  - Density: 3,396.4/sq mi (1,311.36/km^{2})
- Time zone: UTC-5 (Eastern (EST))
  - Summer (DST): UTC-4 (EDT)
- ZIP code: 27517
- Area codes: 919 and 984
- GNIS feature ID: 2812783
- Website: www.villagenc.com

The Governors Village is a 450-acre (180-hectare) New Urbanism neighborhood and census-designated place (CDP) in Chatham County, North Carolina, United States, with an address of Chapel Hill. It was first listed as a CDP in the 2020 census with a population of 1,512.

Governors Village consists of four residential home neighborhoods (Governors Village, Governors Park, Governors Forest, Governors Lake), 160 townhomes (Governors Village and Governors Lake Townes), 242 apartments (Camden Governors Village), and multiple commercial buildings.

Governors Village is located directly across the street from the main entrance to Governors Club, a 1,600-acre (650-hectare) gated community with a 27-hole Jack Nicklaus Signature Golf Course with over 1,200 homes.

== Recreation ==
The community has numerous parks, sidewalks and walking trails including a small community lake. In addition, the community is located just a few miles from Jordan Lake, a large recreation lake.

== Awards ==
Based on its community and volunteer activities Governors Village was named "Community of the Year" for 2009 by the North Carolina Chapter of the Community Associations Institute (Mid-sized Mixed-Use division).

== Business district ==
The original Governors Village Shopping Center opened in 2000 with the opening of the grocery store. That shopping center now includes a dry cleaner, nail salon, and food take out shops. Shortly thereafter, a bank branch opened at the main entrance to Governors Village.

In 2005, a second shopping center opened in Governors Village featuring several restaurants, a veterinarian, and dentist's office. In 2012, The Commons @ Governors Village, another commercial retail center, opened housing the offices of a realty firm, an independent pharmacy, and a construction firm, with an insurance office opening an office in 2016. In 2017 a new commercial building opened with more commercial space opening in the future.

== Demographics ==
Historical population
Census	Pop.	Note	%±
2020	1,512		—
U.S. Decennial Census; 2020

=== 2020 census ===
As of the 2020 census, Governors Village had a population of 1,512. The median age was 48.8 years. 17.5% of residents were under the age of 18 and 27.2% were 65 years of age or older. For every 100 females, there were 75.4 males, and for every 100 females age 18 and over, there were 73.3 males age 18 and over.

100.0% of residents lived in urban areas, while 0.0% lived in rural areas.

There were 675 households, of which 22.1% had children under the age of 18 living in them. Of all households, 47.7% were married-couple households, 15.1% were households with a male householder and no spouse or partner present, and 30.7% were households with a female householder and no spouse or partner present. About 33.4% of all households were made up of individuals, and 12.5% had someone living alone who was 65 years of age or older.

There were 718 housing units, of which 6.0% were vacant. The homeowner vacancy rate was 0.0% and the rental vacancy rate was 1.3%.

Governors Village CDP, North Carolina – Demographic Profile (NH = Non-Hispanic)
Race / Ethnicity	Pop 2020	% 2020
White alone (NH)	1,215	80.36%
Black or African American alone (NH)	76	5.03%
Native American or Alaska Native alone (NH)	1	0.07%
Asian alone (NH)	64	4.23%
Pacific Islander alone (NH)	0	0.00%
Some Other Race alone (NH)	12	0.79%
Mixed Race/Multi-Racial (NH)	74	4.89%
Hispanic or Latino (any race)	70	4.63%
Total	1,512	100.00%

Note: the US Census treats Hispanic/Latino as an ethnic category. This table excludes Latinos from the racial categories and assigns them to a separate category. Hispanics/Latinos can be of any race.
