= Moncure, North Carolina =

- Census-designated place
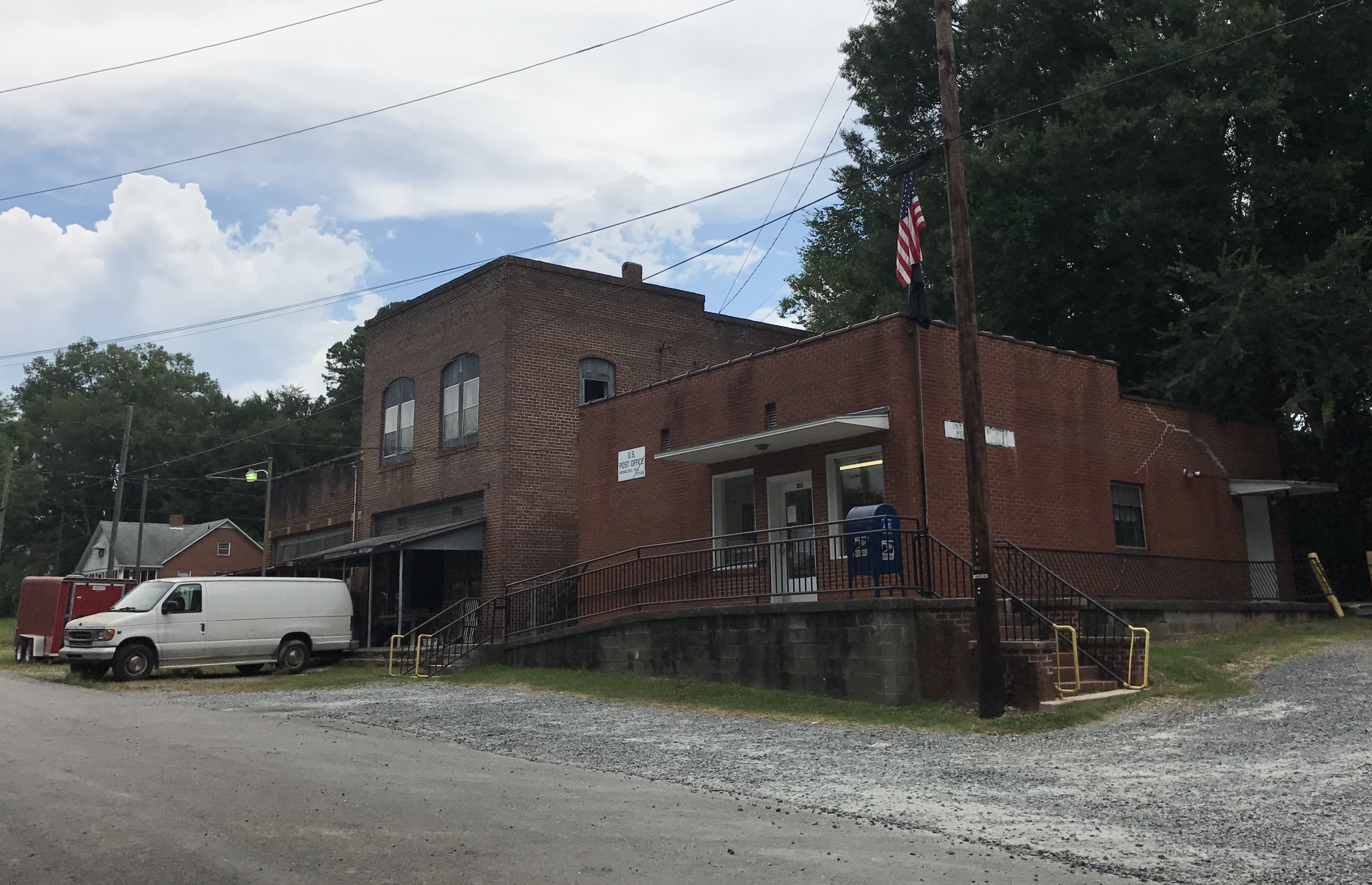
- Cluster of old buildings in Moncure; post office on the right

- Location within North Carolina
- Coordinates: 35°37′26″N 79°04′37″W
- Country: United States
- State: North Carolina
- County: Chatham

Area
  - Total: 4.91 sq mi (12.72 km^{2})
  - Land: 4.73 sq mi (12.25 km^{2})
  - Water: 0.18 sq mi (0.47 km^{2})
- Elevation: 223 ft (68 m)

Population (2020)
  - Total: 780
  - Density: 164.9/sq mi (63.67/km^{2})
- Time zone: UTC-5 (Eastern (EST))
  - Summer (DST): UTC-4 (EDT)
- ZIP code: 27559
- FIPS code: 37-43880
- GNIS feature ID: 2628645

Moncure, founded in 1881, is a small rural unincorporated community in southeastern Chatham County, North Carolina, United States. Moncure and the neighboring community of Haywood form the Moncure census-designated place (CDP), which had a population of 780 at the 2020 census. The community is located near the confluence of the Deep and Haw rivers, which form the Cape Fear River. Moncure once served as the westernmost inland port in the state, linked to the Atlantic Ocean by steamships.

== Geography ==
Moncure is located in southeastern Chatham County. It is bordered on the south by the Deep River, which forms the boundary with Lee County to the south. The Moncure CDP includes the village of Moncure, plus the smaller community of Haywood to the east; both are located along Old US Highway 1. The CDP extends as far east as the Haw River and as far south as the junction of the Haw with the Deep River to form the Cape Fear River. U.S. Route 1, a four-lane expressway, passes through Moncure north of the village center, with access from Exit 79. US 1 leads northeast 28 miles (45 km) to Raleigh, the state capital, and southwest 12 miles (19 km) to Sanford. The area forms a salient or panhandle of Chatham County, lying between Wake and Lee counties.

According to the United States Census Bureau, the Moncure CDP has a total area of 4.9 square miles (12.8 km^{2}), of which 4.7 square miles (12.2 km^{2}) is land and 0.23 square miles (0.6 km^{2}), or 4.61%, is water.

The B. Everett Jordan Lake Dam is located just north of Moncure, and the area is home to much of Chatham County's heavy industry, including Shearon Harris Nuclear Power Plant 8 miles (13 km) to the east, and several plywood and lumber plants.

== Demographics ==
Historical population
Census	Pop.	Note	%±
2020	780		—
U.S. Decennial Census

== Institutions ==
Moncure is home to a post office (ZIP code 27559), two convenience stores and an ABC store (state-operated store selling alcoholic beverages). The Moncure Volunteer Fire Department provides fire protection for the area. The department was founded May 4, 1966. There are two stations: Station 8 in Moncure at 2389 Old US 1 and Station 14 on Corinth Road at the intersection of Highway 42. The Moncure Fire Department Ladies auxiliary is the only active auxiliary in Chatham County.

Moncure and the nearby town of Pittsboro have an active artistic community. The defunct Moncure Museum of Modern Art is located within Moncure.

== History ==
Moncure was founded in 1881 by Thomas Jefferson Moncure, Benjamin Gunter Womble (February 17, 1841 – February 15, 1916), Jake Wisseler, and James Everett Bryan. Thomas Moncure was an engineer for what became the Seaboard Air Line Railroad. Benjamin Womble was a Confederate veteran, owner of the Womble Hotel, and first postmaster of Moncure for 30 years. The old post office now resides on the Womble property that has been continuously owned by his family.

The Newkirk State (Site 3lCH366) and Lockville Dam, Canal and Powerhouse are listed on the National Register of Historic Places.
