= Meadow Creek =

Meadow Creek may refer to:

== Communities ==
- Dixon Lane-Meadow Creek, California
- Meadow Creek, West Virginia

== Streams ==
- Meadow Creek (Haw River tributary), a stream in Alamance County, North Carolina
- Meadow Creek (Rocky River tributary), a stream in Chatham County, North Carolina
- Meadow Creek (Millard County), in Utah
- Meadow Creek (New River), in West Virginia
