= Center Township, Chatham County, North Carolina =

- Township
- Location of Center Township in Chatham County

- Location of Chatham County in North Carolina
- Coordinates: 35.725°N 79.185°W
- Country: United States
- State: North Carolina
- County: Chatham

Area
  - Total: 65.71 sq mi (170.20 km^{2})
- Highest elevation (high point in center of township): 618 ft (188 m)
- Lowest elevation (Jordan Lake at the east end of the township): 216 ft (66 m)

Population (2010)
  - Total: 7,464
  - Density: 113.59/sq mi (43.86/km^{2})
- Time zone: UTC-4 (EST)
  - Summer (DST): UTC-5 (EDT)
- Area codes: 919; 984

Center Township, population 7,464, is one of thirteen townships in Chatham County, North Carolina. Center Township is 65.71 square miles (170.2 km^{2}) in size and located in central Chatham County. Center Township contains the town of Pittsboro within it.

== Geography ==
The Haw River forms the eastern boundary of Center Township. Roberson Creek and Brooks Creek, both tributaries to the Haw River, drain the township in the north and center. Roberson Creek has two tributaries, Turkey Creek and Hill Creek, of its own. The southwest border is delineated by the Rocky River and it has one tributary, Harlands Creek.
