= McGalliard =

McGalliard is a surname. Notable people with the surname include:

- Dan McGalliard (1940–2021), American inventor
- Harris McGalliard (1906–1978), American baseball player

== See also ==
- McGalliard Falls, waterfall in North Carolina, United States
