= List of waterways in North Carolina =

This is a list of waterways in North Carolina. North Carolina contains around 9,300 creeks and rivers, and several lakes as well.

== Rivers ==
This is a short list of the longest rivers in North Carolina.

- Roanoke River
- New River (Kanawha River tributary)
- Neuse River
- Pee Dee River
- Catawba River
- The longest river in the state, the Catawba River
  Tar River
- Yadkin River
- Dan River (Virginia)
- French Broad River
- Cape Fear River

The Neuse River is the longest river that is entirely within North Carolina. See also List of rivers of North Carolina.

== Creeks ==
This is a list of named creeks (Note: Names retrieved from USGS. There may be names not listed on the site. This list does not account for unnamed creeks or lakes.) in alphabetical order.

=== Alamance County, North Carolina ===
- Back Creek
- Big Branch
- Cane Creek
- Greenbrier Creek
- Lick Creek
- Little Creek
- Mary's Creek
- North Prong
- Pine Branch
- Pine Hill Branch
- Poppaw creek
- Reedy Branch
- Rock Creek
- South Fork Cane Creek
- Varnels Creek
- Wells Creek
