= High Shoals Falls =

Waterfall in North Carolina, US

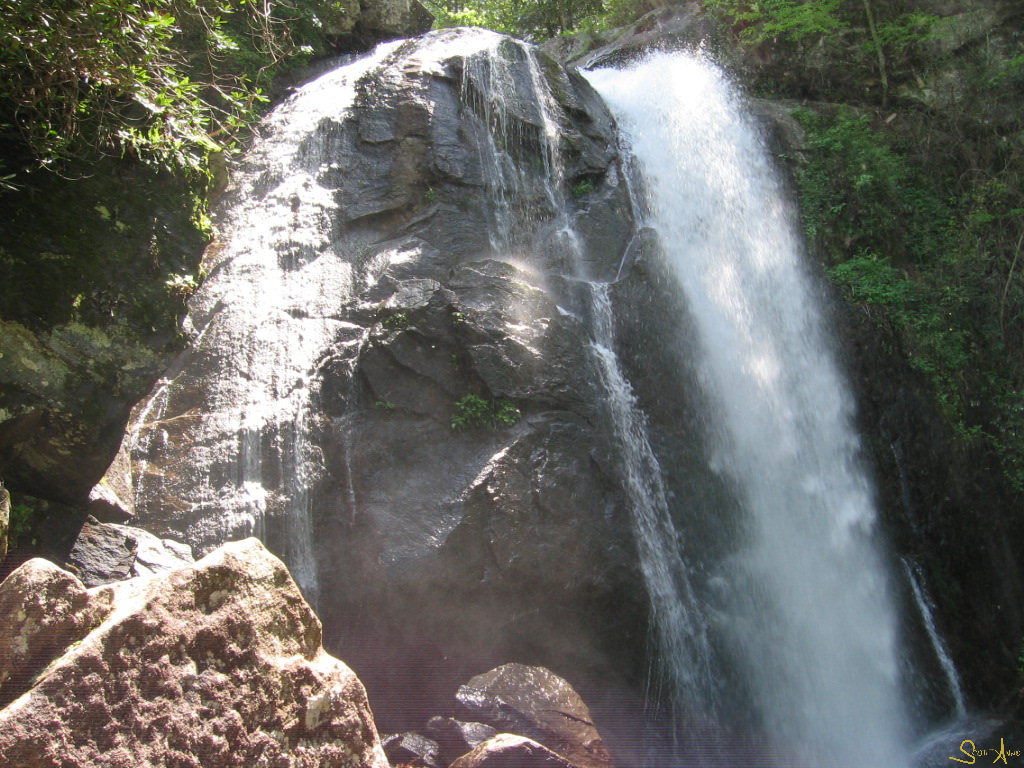
- High Shoals Falls, April 2006
- Interactive map of High Shoals Falls
- Location: South Mountains State Park, Burke County, in the South Mountains of North Carolina
- Coordinates: 35.594419°N 81.635552°W
- Type: Plunge, Cascade
- Total height: 80 ft (24 m)
- Number of drops: 1 with cascades at bottom

High Shoals Falls is a waterfall in Burke County, North Carolina, United States.

== Geology ==
The waterfall is on the Jacob's Fork River, flowing over a large rock outcropping in the South Mountains of North Carolina. The river continues over a series of cascades for approximately 1/4 mile past the falls, where the stream loses approximately 300 ft (100 m) in elevation.

== Natural history ==
The falls are in South Mountains State Park, which is owned and operated by the State of North Carolina. The South Mountains, carved out of the Blue Ridge by erosion, are a broad belt of peaks and knobs rising abruptly from a deep valley. These steep, rugged mountains encompass 100,000 acres (400 km^{2}) in Burke, Cleveland and Rutherford counties. Water winding through the park to the Catawba River cuts deep into the terrain, forming rugged and steep slopes. Funds to purchase the falls and park were appropriated in 1974.

== Visiting the falls ==
The falls is located at South Mountains State Park in North Carolina. There are many trails through the state park, and the most popular is the High Shoals Falls Loop Trail. Visitors are encouraged to stay on the trail. Absolutely no swimming is permitted near the falls, as deaths and injuries have occurred through the years, primarily to people who swim at the top of the falls.

Four people have died at High Shoals Falls since 1993, including a 17-year-old who fell to his death on June 14, 2011.

== Nearby falls ==
Jacob's Fork River has several small cascades both upstream and downstream from High Shoals Falls. Some of these are on State property. Others are on private property.

- McGalliard Falls
- Catawba Falls
- Upper Catawba Falls

== See also ==
- List of waterfalls
- List of waterfalls in North Carolina
