= Lower Creek (North Carolina) =

Creek in North Carolina, United States

- The creek seen in Lenoir

Location
- location: Burke and Caldwell counties, North Carolina

Physical characteristics
- Mouth: Rhodhiss Lake
  - coordinates: 35°47′13″N 81°38′07″W
- Length: 99 miles

Lower Creek is a large creek that flows into Rhodhiss Lake in Burke County, North Carolina. The creek flows south-southeast for 99 miles (Note: All of its tributaries and water bodies that flow into the creek.) before terminating.

The creek discharges about 4 million gallons of water every day.

== See also ==
- List of waterways in North Carolina
