= Polkville, North Carolina =

- Town
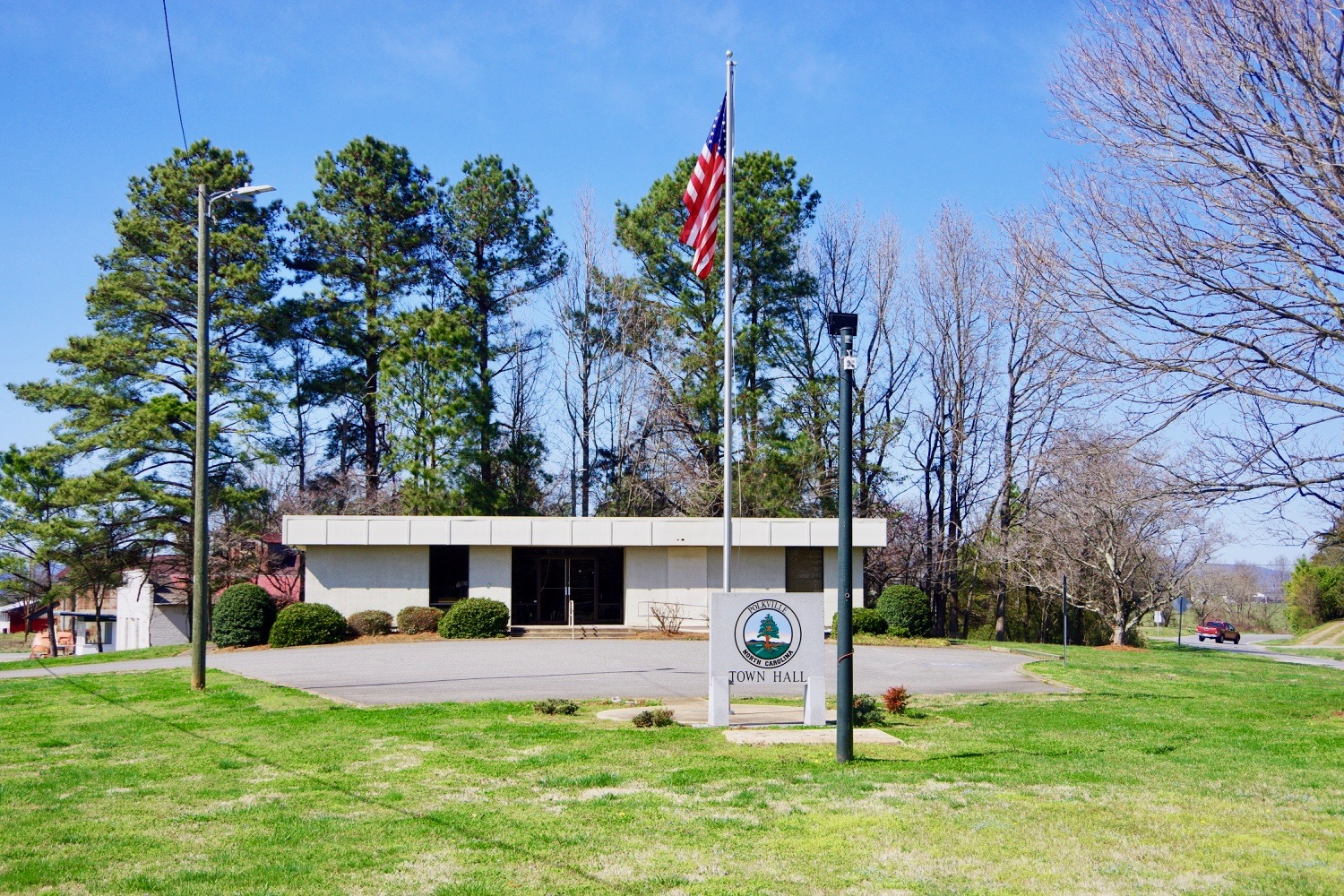
- Town Hall

- Seal

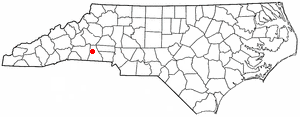
- Location of Polkville, North Carolina
- Coordinates: 35°24′59″N 81°38′38″W
- Country: United States
- State: North Carolina
- County: Cleveland

Area
  - Total: 1.86 sq mi (4.83 km^{2})
  - Land: 1.86 sq mi (4.83 km^{2})
  - Water: 0 sq mi (0.00 km^{2})
- Elevation: 1,083 ft (330 m)

Population (2020)
  - Total: 516
  - Density: 277.0/sq mi (106.94/km^{2})
- Time zone: UTC-5 (Eastern (EST))
  - Summer (DST): UTC-4 (EDT)
- ZIP code: 28136
- Area code: 704
- FIPS code: 37-53160
- GNIS feature ID: 2404545
- Website: polkvillenc.gov

Polkville is a small town in Cleveland County, North Carolina, United States. The population was 545 at the 2010 census.

== History ==
The John Lattimore House was listed on the National Register of Historic Places in 1982.

== Geography ==
Polkville is located in northwestern Cleveland County. North Carolina Highway 226 passes through the center of the town, leading southeast 12 miles (19 km) to Shelby and northwest over the South Mountains 31 miles (50 km) to Marion. North Carolina Highway 182 has its western terminus in Polkville at NC 226, and leads east 25 miles (40 km) to Lincolnton. North Carolina Highway 10 has its southwestern terminus in Polkville, leading northeast 36 miles (58 km) to Newton.

According to the United States Census Bureau, Polkville has a total area of 1.9 square miles (4.8 km^{2}), all land.

== Demographics ==
Historical population
Census	Pop.	Note	%±
1980	528		—
1990	1,514		186.7%
2000	535		−64.7%
2010	545		1.9%
2020	516		−5.3%
U.S. Decennial Census

As of the census of 2010, there were 545 people, 231 households, and 157 families residing in the city. The population density was 283.5 inhabitants per square mile (109.5/km^{2}). There were 234 housing units at an average density of 124.0 per square mile (47.9/km^{2}). The racial makeup of the city was 94.58% White, 3.74% African American, 0.75% from other races, and 0.93% from two or more races. Hispanic or Latino of any race were 2.24% of the population.

There were 214 households, out of which 32.7% had children under the age of 18 living with them, 57.5% were married couples living together, 12.1% had a female householder with no husband present, and 26.6% were non-families. 22.9% of all households were made up of individuals, and 10.3% had someone living alone who was 65 years of age or older. The average household size was 2.50 and the average family size was 2.94.

In the city, the population was spread out, with 26.0% under the age of 18, 6.9% from 18 to 24, 26.2% from 25 to 44, 26.0% from 45 to 64, and 15.0% who were 65 years of age or older. The median age was 38 years. For every 100 females, there were 83.2 males. For every 100 females age 18 and over, there were 84.2 males.

The median income for a household in the city was $28,750, and the median income for a family was $40,875. Males had a median income of $26,797 versus $18,500 for females. The per capita income for the city was $15,015. About 16.3% of families and 19.1% of the population were below the poverty line, including 31.0% of those under age 18 and 18.5% of those age 65 or over.

== Polkville Rodeo ==
The Polkville Rodeo is an annual event that takes place in the Mintz Arena at Polkville Baptist Church. This event is sanctioned by the International Professional Rodeo Association (IPRA) and is presented by F-K Rodeo Company of Charlotte. Advance tickets are available at local businesses as well as those sold at the gate. All proceeds go to benefit church members in their desires to participate in mission trips and disaster relief efforts.
