= Lower Creek =

Lower Creek may refer to:

- Hitchiti dialect of Mikasuki language
- Lower Muskogee Creek Tribe
- Lower Creek (North Carolina), a creek

== See also ==
- Muscogee, for information about Upper and Lower Creeks
- Lower Creek Road truss bridge over the Wickecheoke Creek, historic bridge
