= North Rocky River Prong =

Stream in North Carolina, USA

North Rocky River Prong Tributary to Rocky River
- Location of North Rocky River Prong mouth North Rocky River Prong (the United States)

Location
- Country: United States
- State: North Carolina
- County: Chatham; Alamance; Randolph

Physical characteristics
- Source: Sandy Creek divide
  - location: Liberty, North Carolina
  - coordinates: 35°51′23″N 079°34′17″W
  - elevation: 750 ft (230 m)
- Mouth: Rocky River
  - location: about 3 miles east of Staley, North Carolina
  - coordinates: 35°48′11″N 079°29′06″W
  - elevation: 574 ft (175 m)
- Length: 8.61 mi (13.86 km)
- Basin size: 12.86 square miles (33.3 km^{2})
- Discharge
  - location: Rocky River
  - average: 16.10 cu ft/s (0.456 m^{3}/s) at mouth with Rocky River

Basin features
- Progression: Rocky River → Deep River → Cape Fear River → Atlantic Ocean
- River system: Deep River
- Tributaries
  - left: unnamed tributaries
  - right: unnamed tributaries
- Bridges: S Cook Street, E Raleigh Avenue, S Valley Street, E Graham Avenue, W Holt Street, Virginia Trail, Silk Hope-Liberty Road, Ben Smith Road, Staley-Snow Camp Road, Clyde Clark Road

North Rocky River Prong is a 8.61 mi (13.86 km) long 3rd order tributary to the Rocky River that begins in Liberty, North Carolina in Randolph County and flows to Chatham County.

== Course ==
North Rocky River Prong rises on the northside of Liberty, North Carolina, and then flows southeast into Alamance County and south into Chatham County. North Prong Rocky River joins the Rocky River about 3 miles east of Staley, North Carolina.

== Watershed ==
North Rocky River Prong drains 12.86 square miles (33.3 km^{2}) of area, receives about 47.3 in/year of precipitation, has a wetness index of 437.93 and is about 34% forested.
