= Greenbrier Creek (Rocky River tributary) =

Stream in North Carolina, USA

Greenbrier Creek Tributary to Rocky River
- Location of Greenbrier Creek mouth Greenbrier Creek (Rocky River tributary) (the United States)

Location
- Country: United States
- State: North Carolina
- County: Chatham; Alamance

Physical characteristics
- Source: Poppaw Creek divide
  - location: pond about 1.5 miles northeast of Liberty, North Carolina
  - coordinates: 35°52′15″N 079°29′04″W
  - elevation: 755 ft (230 m)
- Mouth: Rocky River
  - location: about 3 miles northeast of Crutchfield Crossroads, North Carolina
  - coordinates: 35°48′18″N 079°28′48″W
  - elevation: 574 ft (175 m)
- Length: 7.74 mi (12.46 km)
- Basin size: 8.04 square miles (20.8 km^{2})
- Discharge
  - location: Rocky River
  - average: 11.58 cu ft/s (0.328 m^{3}/s) at mouth with Rocky River

Basin features
- Progression: Rocky River → Deep River → Cape Fear River → Atlantic Ocean
- River system: Deep River
- Tributaries
  - left: unnamed tributaries
  - right: unnamed tributaries
- Bridges: Hinshaw Shop Road, Kenly Drive, Staley Store Road, Pleasant Hill Church Road, Silk Hope-Liberty Road

Greenbrier Creek is a 7.74 mi (12.46 km) long 3rd order tributary to the Rocky River that begins in Alamance County and flows to Chatham County.

== Course ==
Greenbrier Creek rises in a pond about 1.5 miles northeast of Liberty, North Carolina in Alamance County. Greenbrier Creek then flows south into Chatham County to join the Rocky River about 3 miles southwest of Crutchfield Crossroads, North Carolina.

== Watershed ==
Greenbrier Creek drains 8.04 square miles (20.8 km^{2}) of area, receives about 47.4 in/year of precipitation, has a wetness index of 453.25 and is about 38% forested.
