= Mud Lick Creek (Rocky River tributary) =

Stream in North Carolina, USA

Mud Lick Creek Tributary to Rocky River
- Location of Mud Lick Creek mouth Mud Lick Creek (Rocky River tributary) (the United States)

Location
- Country: United States
- State: North Carolina
- County: Chatham

Physical characteristics
- Source: Reedy Branch divide
  - location: about 2 miles northeast of Crutchfield Crossroads, North Carolina
  - coordinates: 35°50′13″N 079°24′49″W
  - elevation: 660 ft (200 m)
- Mouth: Rocky River
  - location: about 2 miles southwest of Crutchfield Crossroads, North Carolina
  - coordinates: 35°47′30″N 079°27′55″W
  - elevation: 534 ft (163 m)
- Length: 5.57 mi (8.96 km)
- Basin size: 8.60 square miles (22.3 km^{2})
- Discharge
  - location: Rocky River
  - average: 11.22 cu ft/s (0.318 m^{3}/s) at mouth with Rocky River

Basin features
- Progression: Rocky River → Deep River → Cape Fear River → Atlantic Ocean
- River system: Deep River
- Tributaries
  - left: unnamed tributaries
  - right: unnamed tributaries
- Bridges: Moon Lindley Road, Keith Nunn Drive, Siler City-Snow Camp Road, Silk Hope-Liberty Road, RC Overman Road

Mud Lick Creek is a 5.57 mi (8.96 km) long 3rd order tributary to the Rocky River in Chatham County, North Carolina.

== Course ==
Mud Lick Creek rises about 2 miles northeast of Crutchfield Crossroads, North Carolina in Chatham County. Mud Lick Creek then flows southwest to join the Rocky River about 2 miles southwest of Crutchfield Crossroads.

== Watershed ==
Mud Lick Creek drains 8.60 square miles (22.3 km^{2}) of area, receives about 47.7 in/year of precipitation, has a wetness index of 440.67 and is about 41% forested.
