= Nick Creek (Rocky River tributary) =

Stream in North Carolina, USA

Nick Creek Tributary to Rocky River
- Location of Nick Creek mouth Nick Creek (Rocky River tributary) (the United States)

Location
- Country: United States
- State: North Carolina
- County: Chatham

Physical characteristics
- Source: Nick Creek divide
  - location: pond about 2 miles southeast of Crutchfield Crossroads, North Carolina
  - coordinates: 35°47′36″N 079°24′22″W
  - elevation: 648 ft (198 m)
- Mouth: Rocky River
  - location: about 2.5 miles northeast of Siler City, North Carolina
  - coordinates: 35°45′40″N 079°26′00″W
  - elevation: 505 ft (154 m)
- Length: 3.81 mi (6.13 km)
- Basin size: 5.12 square miles (13.3 km^{2})
- Discharge
  - location: Rocky River
  - average: 6.82 cu ft/s (0.193 m^{3}/s) at mouth with Rocky River

Basin features
- Progression: Rocky River → Deep River → Cape Fear River → Atlantic Ocean
- River system: Deep River
- Tributaries
  - left: unnamed tributaries
  - right: unnamed tributaries
- Bridges: Silk Hope-Liberty Road, Joe Fox Road, Jesse Bridges Road

Nick Creek is a 3.81 mi (6.13 km) long 2nd order tributary to the Rocky River in Chatham County, North Carolina.

== Course ==
Nick Creek rises in a pond about 2 miles southeast of Crutchfield Crossroads, North Carolina in Chatham County and then flows southwest to join the Rocky River about 2.5 miles northeast of Siler City.

== Watershed ==
Nick Creek drains 5.12 square miles (13.3 km^{2}) of area, receives about 47.9 in/year of precipitation, has a wetness index of 440.45 and is about 45% forested.
