= Liberty Historic District (Liberty, North Carolina) =

Historic district in North Carolina, United States

- U.S. National Register of Historic Places
- U.S. Historic district
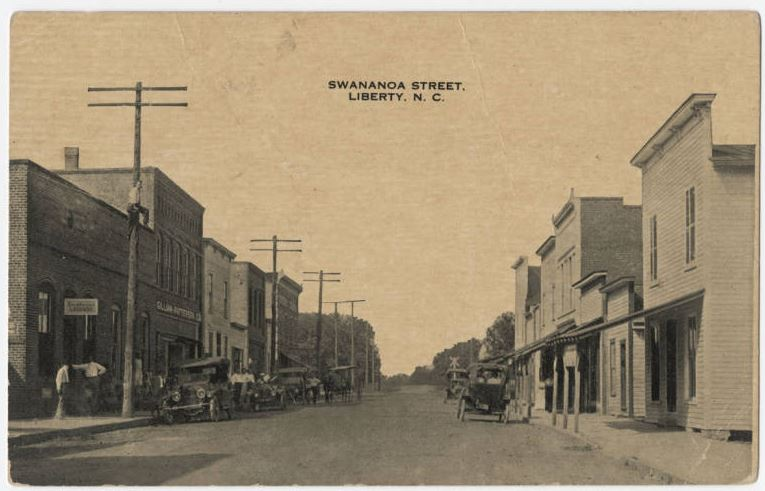
- Swannanoa Street, Liberty, N.C., ca. 1905–1915

- Location within North Carolina Location within the United States
- Location: Roughly along W of Norfolk & Southern RR bet. Butler Ave. and W. Patterson Ave., inc. the 100 blk. of W. Swannanoa St., Liberty, North Carolina
- Coordinates: 35°51′23″N 79°34′22″W
- Area: 90 acres (36 ha)
- Built: 1884
- Architect: Causey, H.C.
- Architectural style: Queen Anne, Colonial Revival, et al.
- NRHP reference No.: 00001426
- Added to NRHP: November 22, 2000

Liberty Historic District is a national historic district located at Liberty, Randolph County, North Carolina, United States.The district encompasses 48 contributing buildings and 2 contributing structures in the central business district and surrounding residential sections of Liberty. It includes buildings built between about 1880 to about 1950 and notable examples of Queen Anne and Colonial Revival architecture. Notable buildings include the Liberty Depot (c. 1885), Reitzel Building (c. 1925), the Farmer's Union Mercantile Co. Building (c. 1905), the Curtis Theater (1949), Bob Patterson House, the A.J. Patterson House, the Bascom M. and Alpha L. Brower House (c. 1915), J.C. Luther House, the Clarence Kennedy House (1940), and Hardin's Florist (c. 1940).

It was added to the National Register of Historic Places in 2000.
