= John Lattimore House =

Historic house in North Carolina, United States

- U.S. National Register of Historic Places
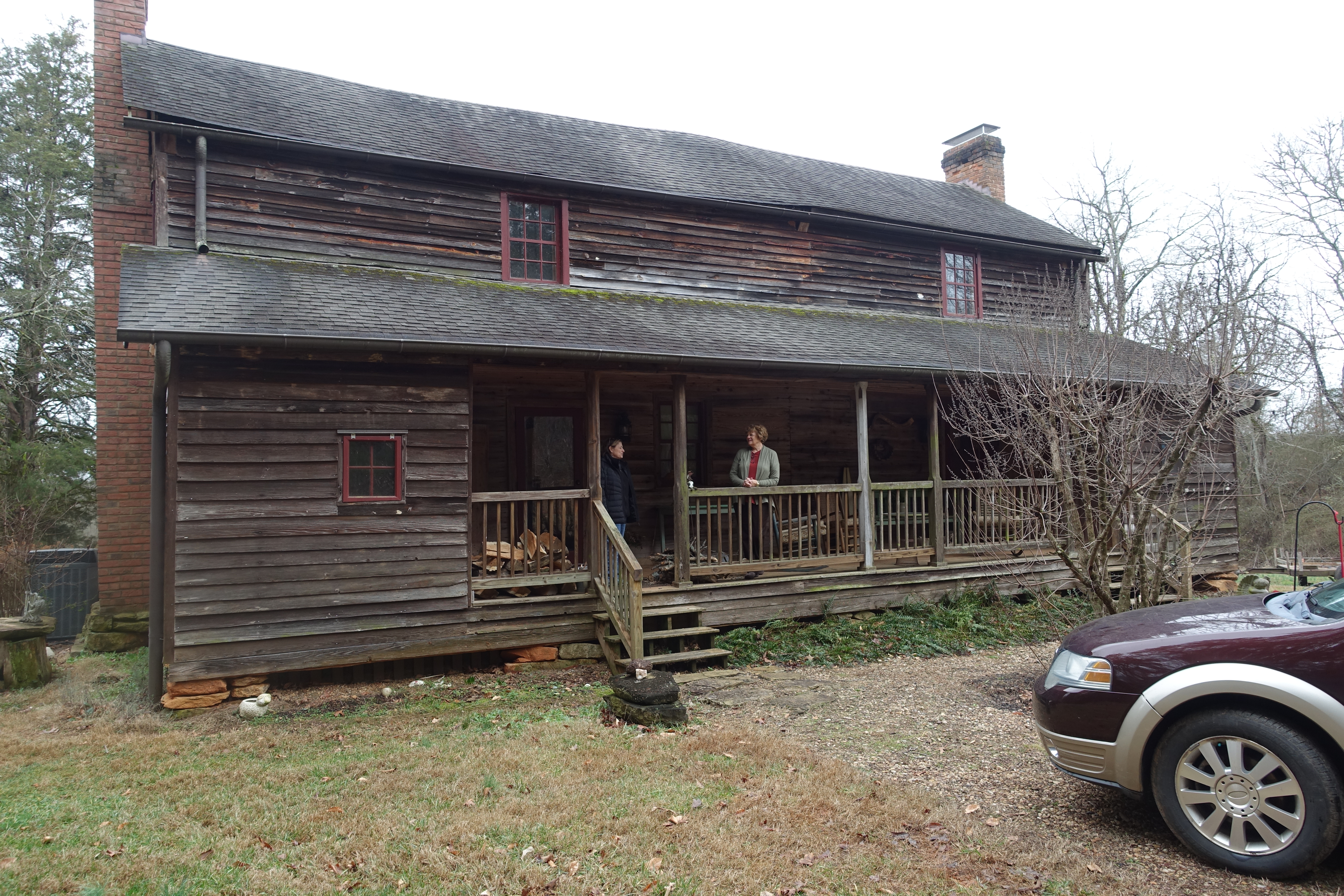

- Location within North Carolina Location within the United States
- Location: Northwest of Polkville on SR 1372, near Polkville, North Carolina
- Coordinates: 35°26′35″N 81°39′57″W
- Area: 65 acres (26 ha)
- NRHP reference No.: 82003445
- Added to NRHP: August 26, 1982

John Lattimore House is a historic home located near Polkville, Cleveland County, North Carolina. It is a vernacular one-story-with-raised-attic dwelling consisting of a one-room, half-dovetailed log structure dated to the early 19th century, with a frame addition, full-length porch, and rear shed rooms added in the 1820s or 1830s. It has a gable roof and sits on a fieldstone pier foundation.

It was listed on the National Register of Historic Places in 1982.
