= Whitehead-Fogleman Farm =

Historic house in North Carolina, United States

- U.S. National Register of Historic Places
- Location within North Carolina Location within the United States
- Location: SR 1352 & SR 1351 junction, near Crutchfield Crossroads, North Carolina
- Coordinates: 35°50′01″N 79°27′20″W
- Area: 36 acres (15 ha)
- Built: c. 1838
- Built by: Whitehead, Arthur
- Architectural style: Federal
- MPS: Chatham County MRA
- NRHP reference No.: 85001462
- Added to NRHP: July 5, 1985

Whitehead-Fogleman Farm is a historic home and farm located near Crutchfield Crossroads, Chatham County, North Carolina. The main house was built about 1838, and is a two-story, Federal style frame dwelling. Also on the property are the contributing saddle-notch log corn crib, a square-notch log and board-and-batten well house, a large V-notch log barn, and a one-room board-and-batten kitchen.

It was listed on the National Register of Historic Places in 1985.
