= Meadow Creek, West Virginia =

- Unincorporated community
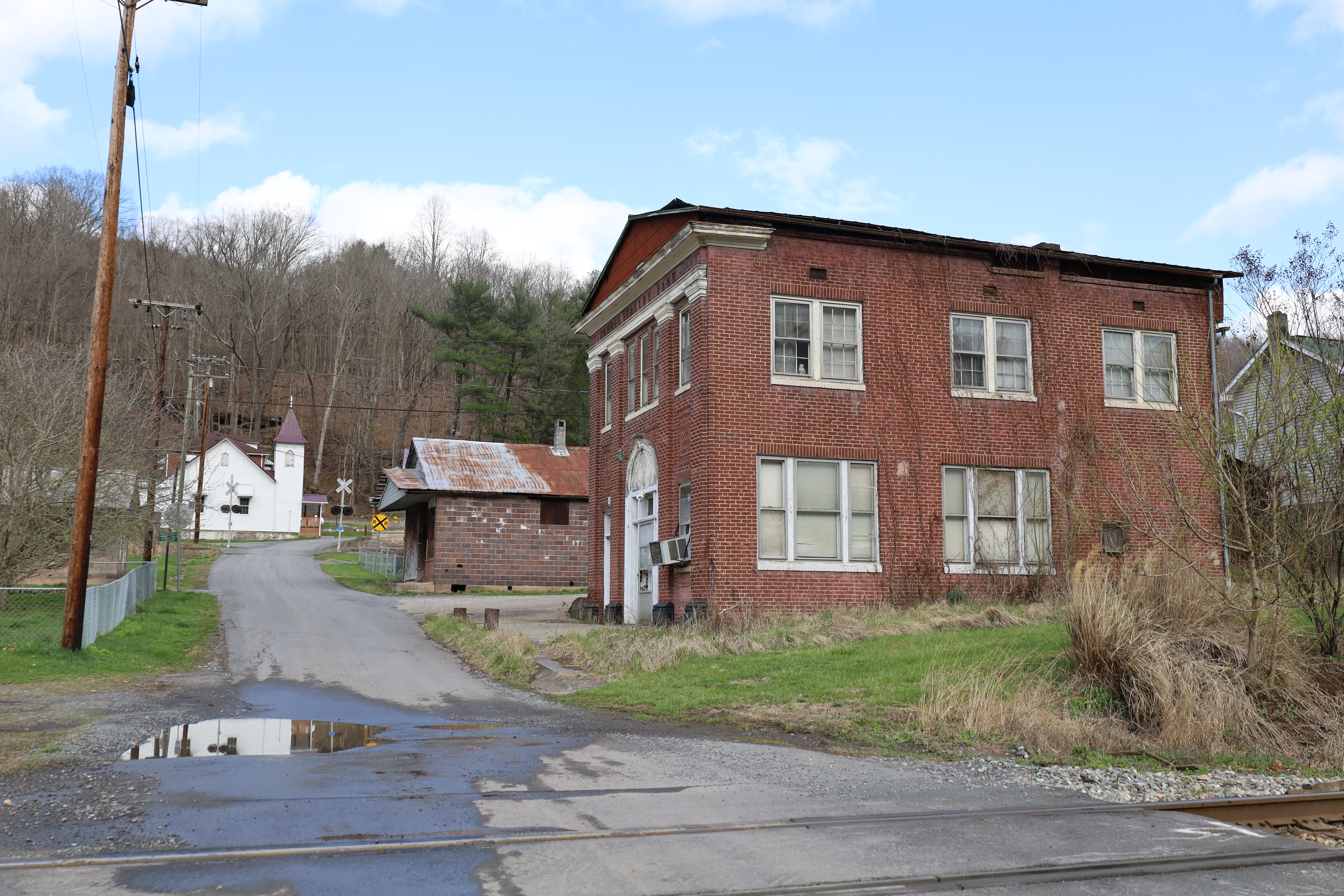
- Former bank and surrounding buildings in Meadow Creek in 2022

- Location within West Virginia Location within the United States
- Coordinates: 37°48′36″N 80°55′23″W
- Country: United States
- State: West Virginia
- County: Summers
- Elevation: 1,289 ft (393 m)
- Time zone: UTC-5 (Eastern (EST))
  - Summer (DST): UTC-4 (EDT)
- ZIP code: 25977
- Area codes: 304 & 681
- GNIS feature ID: 1543056

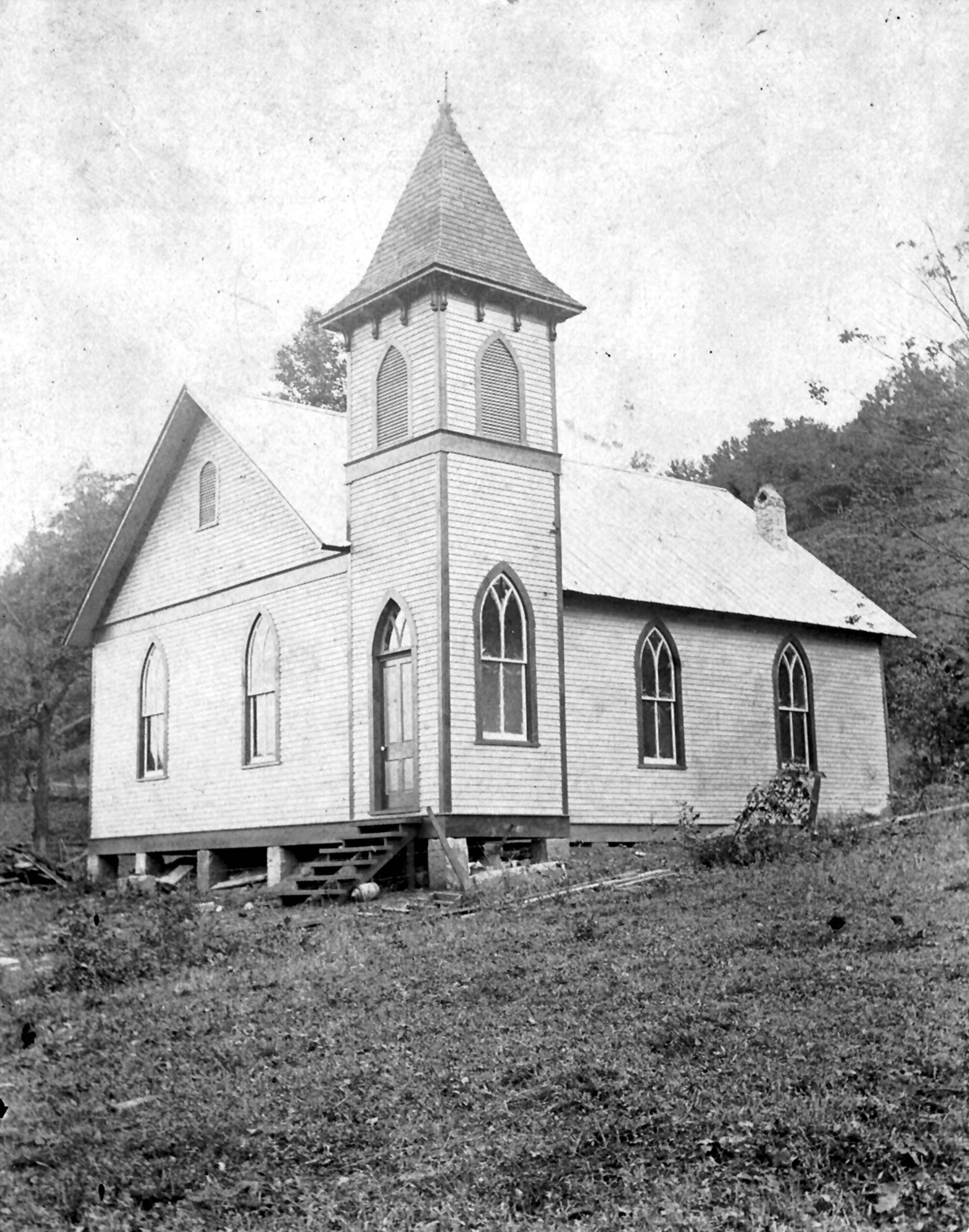

Meadow Creek is an unincorporated community in Summers County, West Virginia, United States. Meadow Creek is located on the New River, southwest of Meadow Bridge and north of Hinton.

The community was named after nearby Meadow Creek. Meadow Creek Baptist Church, est October 21, 1878. The Sewell Valley Bank opened November 4, 1918 and closed in May of 1932. It was liquidated to the First National Bank of Hinton.
