= Lacys Creek =

Stream in North Carolina, USA

Lacys Creek Tributary to Rocky River
- Location of Lacys Creek mouth Lacys Creek (the United States)

Location
- Country: United States
- State: North Carolina
- County: Chatham

Physical characteristics
- Source: Brush Creek divide
  - location: about 1.5 miles northwest of Siler City, North Carolina
  - coordinates: 35°45′12″N 079°29′56″W
  - elevation: 642 ft (196 m)
- Mouth: Rocky River
  - location: about 2 miles north of Siler City, North Carolina
  - coordinates: 35°46′28″N 079°27′39″W
  - elevation: 525 ft (160 m)
- Length: 4.30 mi (6.92 km)
- Basin size: 4.31 square miles (11.2 km^{2})
- Discharge
  - location: Rocky River
  - average: 5.79 cu ft/s (0.164 m^{3}/s) at mouth with Rocky River

Basin features
- Progression: Rocky River → Deep River → Cape Fear River → Atlantic Ocean
- River system: Deep River
- Tributaries
  - left: unnamed tributaries
  - right: unnamed tributaries
- Bridges: Old US 421, US 421, Piney Grove Church Road, Sycamore Lake Road 1382

Lacys Creek is a 4.30 mi (6.92 km) long 2nd order tributary to the Rocky River in Chatham County, North Carolina. This is the only stream of this name in the United States.

== Course ==
Lacys Creek rises about 1.5 miles northwest of Siler City, North Carolina in Chatham County. Lacys Creek then flows northeast to join the Rocky River about 2 miles north of Siler City.

== Watershed ==
Lacys Creek drains 4.31 square miles (11.2 km^{2}) of area, receives about 48.0 in/year of precipitation, has a wetness index of 443.07 and is about 58% forested.
