= Rocky River (Deep River tributary) =

Stream in North Carolina, USA

Rocky River Tributary to Deep River
- Location of Rocky River mouth Rocky River (Deep River tributary) (the United States)

Location
- Country: United States
- State: North Carolina
- Counties: Chatham, Randolph
- City: Liberty

Physical characteristics
- Source: Pond on the divide of Sandy Creek and North Prong
  - location: Liberty, North Carolina
  - coordinates: 35°50′56″N 079°34′33″W
  - elevation: 755 ft (230 m)
- Mouth: Deep River
  - location: about 3 miles west of Moncure, North Carolina
  - coordinates: 35°37′02″N 079°09′01″W
  - elevation: 198 ft (60 m)
- Length: 42.5 mi (68.4 km)
- Basin size: 243.42 square miles (630.5 km^{2})
- Discharge
  - location: Deep River
  - average: 262.64 cu ft/s (7.437 m^{3}/s) at mouth with Deep River

Basin features
- Progression: Deep River → Cape Fear River → Atlantic Ocean
- River system: Deep River
- Tributaries
  - left: North Rocky River Prong; Greenbrier Creek; Mud Lick Creek; Nick Creek; Landrum Creek; Harlands Creek
  - right: Lacys Creek; Loves Creek; Varnell Creek; Meadow Creek; Tick Creek; Bear Creek
- Waterbodies: Sizemore Lake
- Bridges: South Foster Street, W Kime Avenue, NC 49, Old US 421, Pike Farm Road, Cooper Road, Staley Snow Camp Road, Piney Grove Church Road, Ed Clapp Road, Siler City-Snow Camp Road, US 64, Rives Chapel Church Road, NC 902, Pittsboro-Goldston Road, Chatham Church Road, US 15-NC 87

Rocky River is a 42.5 mi (68.4 km) long 5th order tributary to the Deep River in Chatham County, North Carolina.

== Course ==
Rocky River rises in Liberty, North Carolina on the Sandy Creek and North Prong divide in Randolph County and then flows southeasterly to the Deep River about 3 miles west of Moncure, North Carolina.

== Watershed ==
Rocky River drains 243.42 square miles (630.5 km^{2}) of area, receives about 47.6 in/year of precipitation, and has a wetness index of 426.50 and is about 55% forested.

Tributaries of the Rocky River (Deep River tributary) in North Carolina

Name, Bank	Watershed Area in Square Miles (km^{2})	Average Discharge	Stream Length	Mouth Coordinates	Mouth Elevation	Source Coordinates	Source Elevation	% of Average Discharge	Remarks
Mouth	243.42 square miles (630.5 km^{2})	262.64 cu ft/s (7.437 m^{3}/s)	42.5 mi (68.4 km)	35°37′02″N 079°09′01″W	198 ft (60 m)	35°50′56″N 079°34′33″W	785 ft (239 m)	N/A	Rocky River rises in a pond in Liberty, North Carolina and then flows southeast to meet the Deep River about 3 miles west of Moncure, North Carolina.
Bear Creek, right bank	51.71 square miles (133.9 km^{2})	59.07 cu ft/s (1.673 m^{3}/s)	24.49 mi (39.41 km)	35°37′52″N 079°12′26″W	275 ft (84 m)	35°38′14″N 079°29′03″W	565 ft (172 m)	22.5%	Bear Creek, a 4th order tributary, rises about 4 miles west-southwest of Bonlee, North Carolina on the Brush Creek divide. Bear Creek then takes an easterly course to meet the Rocky River about 6 miles south of Pittsboro, North Carolina. This stream is the largest Rocky River tributary in drainage area and average discharge.
Harlands Creek, left bank	15.76 square miles (40.8 km^{2})	18.88 cu ft/s (0.535 m^{3}/s)	10.34 mi (16.64 km)	35°39′35″N 079°15′15″W	318 ft (97 m)	35°45′55″N 079°16′33″W	540 ft (160 m)	7.2%	Harlands Creek, a 3rd order tributary, rises about 1.5 miles west of Gum Springs, North Carolina on the Dry Creek divide. Harlands Creek then takes a southerly course to meet the Rocky River about 5 miles southwest of Pittsboro, North Carolina.
Landrum Creek, left bank	17.51 square miles (45.4 km^{2})	21.19 cu ft/s (0.600 m^{3}/s)	8.64 mi (13.90 km)	35°40′10″N 079°16′09″W	325 ft (99 m)	35°43′03″N 079°21′04″W	665 ft (203 m)	8.1%	Landrum Creek, a 3rd order tributary, rises on the east side of Hickory Mountain divided by an unnamed tributary to the Rocky River. Landrum Creek then flows southeast to meet the Rocky River 5.5 miles southwest of Pittsboro, North Carolina.
Tick Creek, right bank	21.73 square miles (56.3 km^{2})	21.52 cu ft/s (0.609 m^{3}/s)	12.20 mi (19.63 km)	35°41′02″N 079°20′27″W	398 ft (121 m)	35°40′29″N 079°29′01″W	665 ft (203 m)	8.2%	Tick Creek, a 3rd order tributary, rises in a pond about 4 miles south of Siler City, North Carolina on the Loves Creek divide. Tick Creek then flows south and curves northeast to meet the Rocky River about 5 miles southeast of Siler City. This stream is the second largest Rocky River tributary in drainage area and average discharge.
Meadow Creek, right bank	5.68 square miles (14.7 km^{2})	7.40 cu ft/s (0.210 m^{3}/s)	4.70 mi (7.56 km)	35°41′41″N 079°21′42″W	425 ft (130 m)	35°42′11″N 079°25′51″W	625 ft (191 m)	2.8%	Meadow Creek, a 3rd order tributary, rises about 1.5 miles southeast of Siler City, North Carolina on the Loves Creek divide. Meadow Creek then takes a southeasterly course to meet the Rocky River about 3.5 miles southeast of Siler City.
Varnell Creek, left bank	10.09 square miles (26.1 km^{2})	12.99 cu ft/s (0.368 m^{3}/s)	6.88 mi (11.07 km)	35°43′34″N 079°24′12″W	475 ft (145 m)	35°47′35″N 079°23′51″W	655 ft (200 m)	4.9%	Varnell Creek, a 3rd order tributary, rises in a pond about 5 miles northeast of Siler City, North Carolina on the Nick Creek divide. Varnell Creek then takes a southerly course to meet the Rocky River about 2 miles east of Siler City.
Loves Creek, right bank	8.19 square miles (21.2 km^{2})	10.68 cu ft/s (0.302 m^{3}/s)	5.59 mi (9.00 km)	35°43′58″N 079°25′22″W	488 ft (149 m)	35°40′34″N 079°29′26″W	705 ft (215 m)	4.1%	Loves Creek, a 3rd order tributary, rises in a pond about 3 miles south-southwest of Siler City, North Carolina on the Brush Creek divide. Loves Creek then flows northeast to meet the Rocky River about 1 mile east of Siler City.
Nick Creek, left bank	5.12 square miles (13.3 km^{2})	6.82 cu ft/s (0.193 m^{3}/s)	3.81 mi (6.13 km)	35°45′40″N 079°26′00″W	505 ft (154 m)	35°47′36″N 079°24′22″W	648 ft (198 m)	2.6%	Nick Creek, a 2nd order tributary, rises in a pond about 2 miles southeast of Crutchfield Crossroads, North Carolina on the South Fork divide. Nick Creek then flows southwest to meet the Rocky River about 2.5 miles northeast of Siler City, North Carolina.
Lacys Creek, right bank	4.31 square miles (11.2 km^{2})	5.79 cu ft/s (0.164 m^{3}/s)	4.30 mi (6.92 km)	35°46′28″N 079°27′39″W	525 ft (160 m)	35°45′12″N 079°29′56″W	642 ft (196 m)	2.2%	Lacys Creek, a 2nd order tributary, rises about 1.5 miles northwest of Siler City, North Carolina on the Brush Creek divide. Lacys Creek then takes a northeasterly course to meet the Rocky River about 2 miles north of Siler City.
Mud Lick Creek, left bank	8.60 square miles (22.3 km^{2})	11.22 cu ft/s (0.318 m^{3}/s)	5.57 mi (8.96 km)	35°47′30″N 079°27′55″W	534 ft (163 m)	35°50′17″N 079°24′49″W	660 ft (200 m)	4.3%	Mud Lick Creek, a 3rd order tributary, rises about 2 miles northeast of Crutchfield Crossroads, North Carolina on the Reedy Branch divide. Mud Lick Creek then flows southwest to meet the Rocky River about 2 miles southwest of Crutchfield Crossroads.
Greenbrier Creek, left bank	8.04 square miles (20.8 km^{2})	11.58 cu ft/s (0.328 m^{3}/s)	7.74 mi (12.46 km)	35°48′18″N 079°28′48″W	574 ft (175 m)	35°52′15″N 079°29′04″W	755 ft (230 m)	4.4%	Greenbrier Creek, a 3rd order tributary, rises in a pond about 1.5 miles northeast of Liberty, North Carolina on the Poppaw Creek divide. Greenbrier Creek then flows south to meet the Rocky River about 3 miles south of Crutchfield Crossroads.
North Rocky River Prong, left bank	12.86 square miles (33.3 km^{2})	16.10 cu ft/s (0.456 m^{3}/s)	8.61 mi (13.86 km)	35°48′11″N 079°29′06″W	574 ft (175 m)	35°51′23″N 079°34′17″W	750 ft (230 m)	6.1%	North Rocky River Prong, a 3rd order tributary, rises in Liberty, North Carolina on the Sandy Creek divide. North Rocky River Prong then flows southeast to meet the Rocky River about 3 miles east of Staley, North Carolina.

== See also ==
- List of rivers of North Carolina
