= Liberty, North Carolina =

- Town
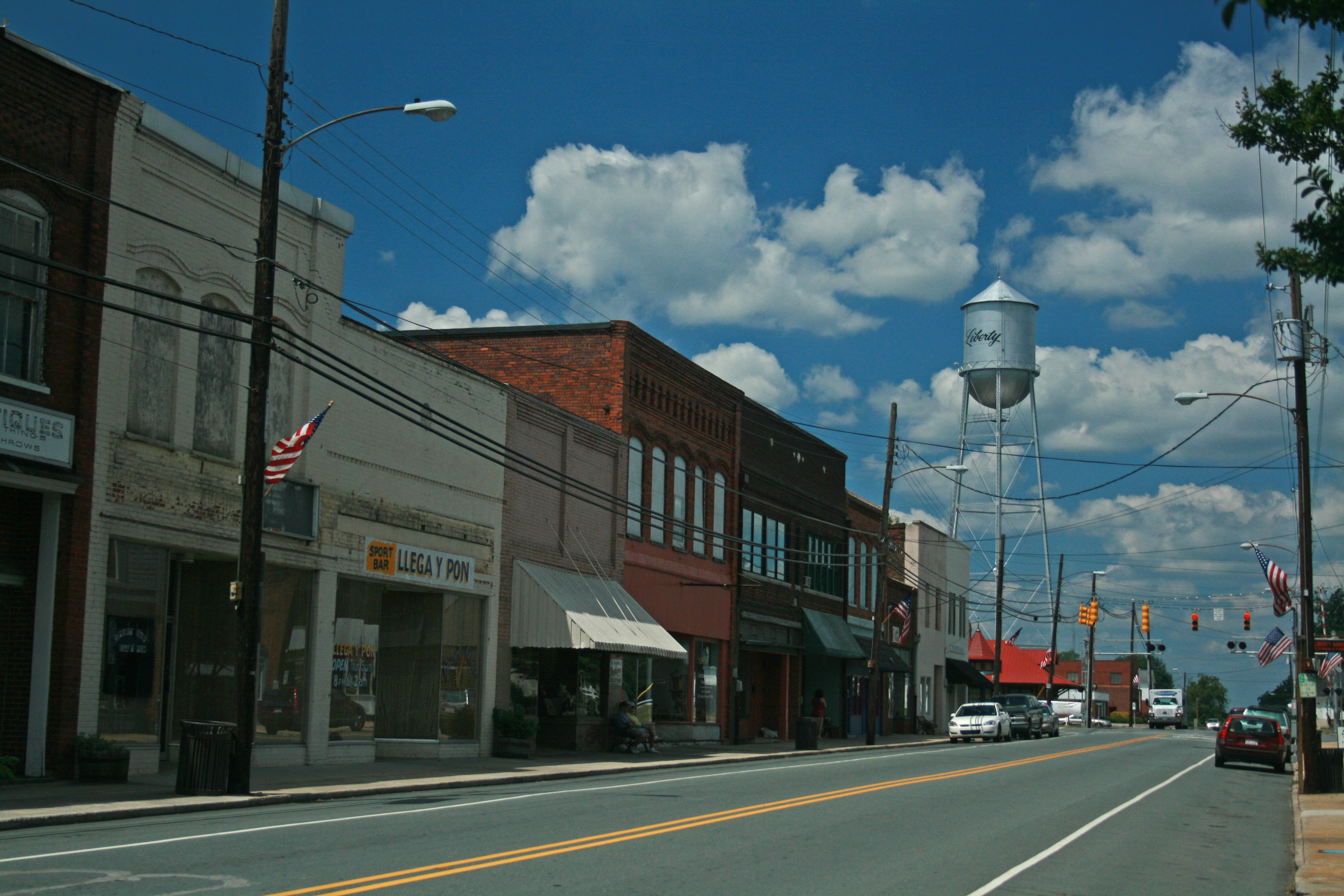
- Downtown Liberty
- Motto: "A Great Place to Live"
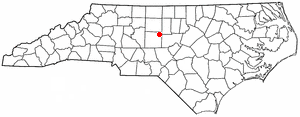
- Location of Liberty, North Carolina
- Coordinates: 35°51′20″N 79°34′06″W
- Country: United States
- State: North Carolina
- County: Randolph
- Founded: 1809
- Incorporated: 1889
- Named for: A plantation owned by John Leak

Area
  - Total: 3.15 sq mi (8.15 km^{2})
  - Land: 3.13 sq mi (8.11 km^{2})
  - Water: 0.012 sq mi (0.03 km^{2})
- Elevation: 751 ft (229 m)

Population (2020)
  - Total: 2,655
  - Density: 847.6/sq mi (327.27/km^{2})
- Time zone: UTC-5 (Eastern (EST))
  - Summer (DST): UTC-4 (EDT)
- ZIP code: 27298
- Area code: 336
- FIPS code: 37-38100
- GNIS feature ID: 2406017
- Website: www.liberty-nc.com

Liberty is a town in Randolph County, North Carolina, United States. As of the 2020 census, Liberty had a population of 2,655.

== History ==
Originally named Liberty Oak, the town was founded in 1809 near the plantation of John Leak. The first church within the town was the Liberty Christian Church (now the United Church of Christ) founded on October 11, 1884. The town's first school, the Liberty Academy, was founded on May 6, 1885, as a charter school, and helped to foster the town's early reputation as a place of higher learning. Liberty is home to the mother church of the Southern Baptist denomination (Sandy Creek Baptist Church).

The Liberty Historic District was added to the National Register of Historic Places in 2000, largely due to the efforts of Mrs. Francine Swaim, a local writer, teacher, and historian.

== Geography ==
Liberty is drained by the Rocky River on the south and southwest and its tributary North Rocky River Prong on the northeast. Sandy Creek, a tributary of the Deep River, drains the town on the west and northwest.

== Events and landmarks ==
Liberty is also home to the famous the Liberty Antiques Festival. Also, the Liberty Showcase has had many distinguished Nashville recording stars such as Ronnie McDowell, Lorrie Morgan, Gene Watson, Exile, and many more. The movies Killers Three (1968) and Children of the Corn II: The Final Sacrifice (1993) were filmed in Liberty and the surrounding areas.

One of Liberty's most noticeable landmarks is the Patterson House Museum, near the town hall; it was originally constructed in 1885 by Dr. Armstead Jackson Patterson as a retirement home for his parents. Other local landmarks are the historical Liberty train station (which is not open to the public), and the Vance York house.

== Demographics ==
Historical population
Census	Pop.	Note	%±
1890	366		—
1900	304		−16.9%
1910	474		55.9%
1920	636		34.2%
1930	873		37.3%
1940	922		5.6%
1950	1,342		45.6%
1960	1,438		7.2%
1970	2,167		50.7%
1980	1,997		−7.8%
1990	2,047		2.5%
2000	2,661		30.0%
2010	2,656		−0.2%
2020	2,655		0.0%
U.S. Decennial Census

=== 2020 census ===
As of the 2020 census, Liberty had a population of 2,655. The median age was 42.5 years. 21.8% of residents were under the age of 18 and 20.4% of residents were 65 years of age or older. For every 100 females there were 90.9 males, and for every 100 females age 18 and over there were 88.8 males age 18 and over.

0.0% of residents lived in urban areas, while 100.0% lived in rural areas.

There were 1,104 households in Liberty, of which 29.0% had children under the age of 18 living in them. Of all households, 38.7% were married-couple households, 19.8% were households with a male householder and no spouse or partner present, and 35.8% were households with a female householder and no spouse or partner present. About 33.6% of all households were made up of individuals and 18.3% had someone living alone who was 65 years of age or older.

There were 1,209 housing units, of which 8.7% were vacant. The homeowner vacancy rate was 2.0% and the rental vacancy rate was 6.5%.

Liberty racial composition
Race	Number	Percentage
White (non-Hispanic)	1,551	58.42%
Black or African American (non-Hispanic)	494	18.61%
Native American	21	0.79%
Asian	19	0.72%
Other/Mixed	99	3.73%
Hispanic or Latino	471	17.74%

=== 2000 census ===
As of the census of 2000, 2,661 people, 1,033 households, and 708 families resided in the town. The population density was 1,020.8 inhabitants per square mile (394.1/km^{2}). The 1,094 housing units averaged 419.7 per square mile (161.8/km^{2}). The racial makeup of the town was 65.69% White, 23.64% African American, 0.71% Native American, 0.08% Asian, 8.08% from other races, and 1.80% from two or more races. About 14.2% of the population was Hispanic or Latino of any race.

Of the 1,033 households, 32.4% had children under the age of 18 living with them, 49.3% were married couples living together, 14.7% had a female householder with no husband present, and 31.4% were not families; 27.3% of all households were made up of individuals, and 14.3% had someone living alone who was 65 years of age or older. The average household size was 2.56 and the average family size was 3.09.

In the town, the population was distributed as 26.1% under the age of 18, 8.9% from 18 to 24, 29.7% from 25 to 44, 21.6% from 45 to 64, and 13.8% who were 65 years of age or older. The median age was 35 years. For every 100 females, there were 92.1 males. For every 100 females age 18 and over, there were 89.7 males.

The median income for a household in the town was $35,052, and for a family was $44,179. Males had a median income of $27,944 versus $21,462 for females. The per capita income for the town was $16,345. About 12.2% of the population and 9.9% of families were below the poverty line. Of the total population, 12.9% of those under the age of 18 and 16.1% of those 65 and older were living below the poverty line.

== Aviation ==
Liberty has long been important to the aviation community. In addition to having several private airports in the vicinity, Liberty lies at the intersection of several air traffic routes that serve the East Coast. A Vortac owned by the Federal Aviation Administration for air traffic navigation is based just outside town near Sandy Creek Church. Liberty is also located near the delineation point for the Atlanta Air Route Traffic Control Center (Atlanta Center) and the Washington Air Route Traffic Control Center (Washington Center). All planes flying west of Liberty must be directed by Atlanta, while all planes flying east must be directed by Washington.
