= Tick Creek (Rocky River tributary) =

Stream in North Carolina, USA

Tick Creek Tributary to Rocky River
- Location of Tick Creek mouth Tick Creek (Rocky River tributary) (the United States)

Location
- Country: United States
- State: North Carolina
- County: Chatham

Physical characteristics
- Source: Loves Creek divide
  - location: Pond about 4 miles south of Siler City, North Carolina
  - coordinates: 35°40′29″N 079°29′01″W
  - elevation: 665 ft (203 m)
- Mouth: Rocky River
  - location: about 5 miles southeast of Siler City, North Carolina
  - coordinates: 35°41′02″N 079°20′27″W
  - elevation: 398 ft (121 m)
- Length: 12.20 mi (19.63 km)
- Basin size: 21.73 square miles (56.3 km^{2})
- Discharge
  - location: Rocky River
  - average: 21.52 cu ft/s (0.609 m^{3}/s) at mouth with Rocky River

Basin features
- Progression: Rocky River → Deep River → Cape Fear River → Atlantic Ocean
- River system: Deep River
- Tributaries
  - left: Evans Creek; Welsh Branch
  - right: unnamed tributaries
- Bridges: Oakley Church Road, Pear Drive, Joe Brown Road, Siler City-Glendon Road, Petty Road, Tick Creek Preserve Lane, Old US 421, US 421, Ike Brooks Road, Rives Chapel Church Road, Tommy Moody Drive

Tick Creek is a 12.20 mi (19.63 km) long 3rd order tributary to the Rocky River in Chatham County, North Carolina.

== Course ==
Tick Creek rises in a pond on the Love Creek divide about 4 miles south of Siler City, North Carolina in Chatham County and then flows south and makes a curve to the northeast to join the Rocky River about 5 miles southeast of Siler City.

== Watershed ==
Tick Creek drains 21.73 square miles (56.3 km^{2}) of area, receives about 47.7 in/year of precipitation, has a wetness index of 411.49 and is about 55% forested.
