= Fishing Creek Reservoir =

Reservoir in South Carolina

Coordinates: 34°38′35″N 80°53′38″W

Fishing Creek Reservoir, also referred to as Fishing Creek Lake, is a man-made reservoir on the Catawba River near Lancaster, South Carolina, United States. The reservoir is managed by the public utility Duke Energy and serves multiple purposes, including hydroelectric power generation, recreation, and water resource management. The reservoir covers an area of approximately 3,431 acres and is impounded by a dam that measures about 1,770 feet in length. The surrounding shoreline remains largely undeveloped.

Fishing Creek Reservoir is situated primarily within Lancaster and Chester counties in South Carolina. It functions as a run-of-the-river reservoir, with limited water storage capacity and depends largely on the natural flow of the river. The reservoir features approximately 85 miles of shoreline.

== History ==
Established in 1916, the Fishing Creek Reservoir was developed to generate hydroelectric power. This is achieved through a dam operated by Duke Energy.

== Watershed and course ==
Fishing Creek Reservoir is part of the Catawba-Wateree Lakes system, a series of interconnected reservoirs. This system supports hydroelectric power generation and includes several other lakes, such as James, Rhodhiss, Hickory, Lookout, Shoals, Norman, Mountain Island, Wylie, Rocky Creek, and Wateree.

The public utility is responsible for managing water levels and energy production across the system. In addition to operational oversight, the utility also regulates shoreline use, including the permitting and maintenance of piers, docks, and other structures along the hundreds of miles of shoreline encompassed by the reservoir network.
