= South Mountains (North Carolina) =

American mountain range

Coordinates: 35.5956837°N 81.6956517°W

The South Mountains are an ancient and deeply eroded mountain range in western North Carolina. They are an isolated remnant of the much larger Appalachian Mountains to the west, and are separated from the Blue Ridge Mountain chain by the Catawba River valley. The range covers approximately 100,000 acres (400 km²) in Burke, Cleveland, McDowell and Rutherford counties. The South Mountains are the highest and most rugged chain of the isolated mountain ranges which dot North Carolina's Piedmont or foothills region. The highest point in the range is contested. Icy Knob (privately owned, part of a gated community), Hickory Knob, Propst Mountain, and Buzzard’s Roost are all approaching 3,000 feet (914 meters) of elevation. Which is the highest has varied by source and with new data. The South Mountains are heavily forested with Southeastern mixed forests. Water erosion from numerous rivers and streams has given the mountains narrow ridges and valleys.

The mountains were once inhabited by the Cherokee or Catawba tribes and before the region was colonized by British settlers of the Province of North Carolina. After gold was discovered in the mountains in the 19th century, numerous prospectors moved into the area. By the time the mines closed in the early 20th century over $1 million in gold had been found. Today the mountains are sparsely populated, and no communities of more than a few hundred people are located in the immediate region (the largest nearby city is Morganton, North Carolina, located five miles north of the range). Much of the South Mountains remain in the hands of private owners. However, in 1973 the State of North Carolina paid $1.5 million to acquire 5,779 acres (23.4 km²) of land in the South Mountains, and in 1975 the South Mountains State Park was created. Today the park covers 20,949 acres (84.78 km²), and includes the impressive High Shoals Falls, which cascade over 80 feet down a sheer cliff and form a large, deep pool at the bottom. The park, like most of the South Mountains, is largely undeveloped, and much of it is still wilderness. Numerous rare and endangered plants lie within its boundaries, much of them documented by botanist Bill Moye, whose efforts helped expand the park to its present size. Adjacent to the state park the North Carolina Wildlife Resources Commission's South Mountain Game Land encompasses an additional 22,575 acres in Burke, Cleveland, McDowell and Rutherford counties. Bordering the state lands, Foothills Conservancy of North Carolina, a nonprofit land trust based in Morganton, manages 1,906 acres in the South Mountains Headwaters and Cane Creek Meadows Preserves as well as smaller tracts in the Wilderness Gateway State Trail corridor. The nearby Bob's Creek State Natural Area in McDowell County protects another 6000 acres.
