= Landrum Creek (Rocky River tributary) =

Stream in North Carolina, USA

Landrum Creek Tributary to Rocky River
- Location of Landrum Creek mouth Landrum Creek (Rocky River tributary) (the United States)

Location
- Country: United States
- State: North Carolina
- County: Chatham

Physical characteristics
- Source: unnamed tributary to Rocky River and Dry Creek divide
  - location: east side of Hickory Mountain
  - coordinates: 35°43′03″N 079°21′04″W
  - elevation: 665 ft (203 m)
- Mouth: Rocky River
  - location: about 5.5 miles southwest of Pittsboro, North Carolina
  - coordinates: 35°40′10″N 079°16′04″W
  - elevation: 325 ft (99 m)
- Length: 8.64 mi (13.90 km)
- Basin size: 17.51 square miles (45.4 km^{2})
- Discharge
  - location: Rocky River
  - average: 21.19 cu ft/s (0.600 m^{3}/s) at mouth with Rocky River

Basin features
- Progression: Rocky River → Deep River → Cape Fear River → Atlantic Ocean
- River system: Deep River
- Tributaries
  - left: Long Branch
  - right: unnamed tributaries
- Bridges: Pleasant Hill Church Road, Landrum Hills Road, Jay Shambley Road, Hadley Mill Road, NC 902

Landrum Creek is a 8.64 mi (13.90 km) long 3rd order tributary to the Rocky River in Chatham County, North Carolina.

== Course ==
Landrum Creek rises on the east side of Hickory Mountain in Chatham County, North Carolina and then flows southeast to join the Rocky River about 5.5 miles southwest of Pittsboro.

== Watershed ==
Landrum Creek drains 17.51 square miles (45.4 km^{2}) of area, receives about 47.5 in/year of precipitation, has a wetness index of 410.26 and is about 60% forested.
