= South Mountains State Park =

State park in Burke County, North Carolina, United States

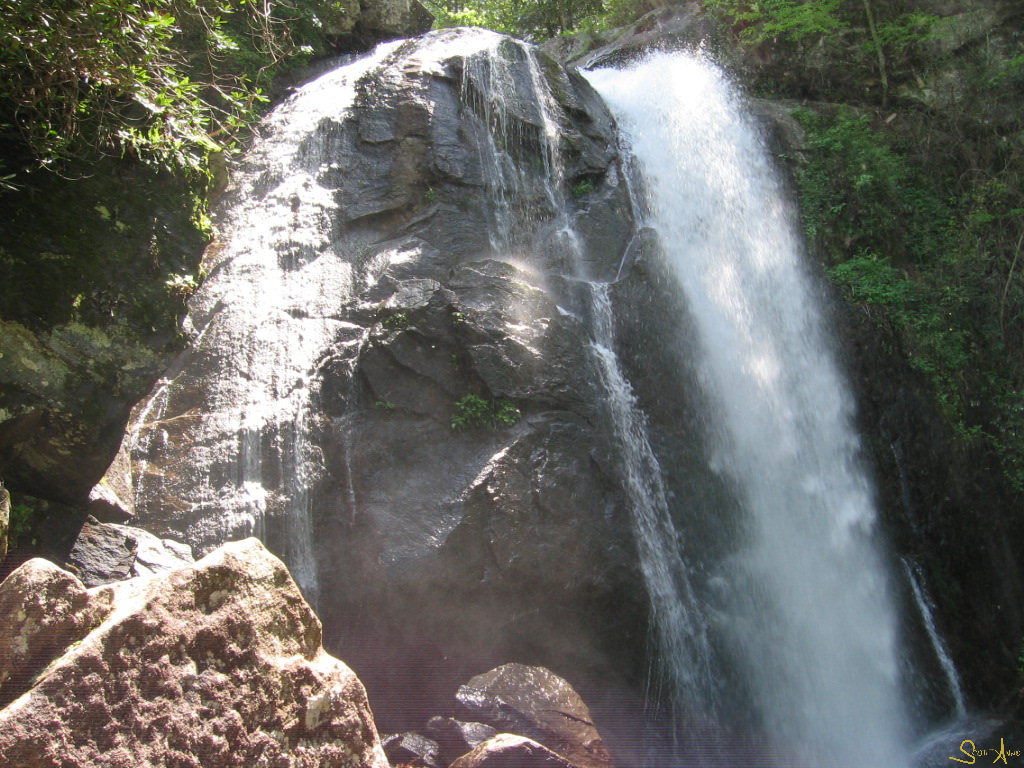
- High Shoals Falls at South Mountains State Park

- Location within North Carolina Location within the United States
- Interactive map of South Mountains State Park
- Location: Burke County, North Carolina, United States
- Coordinates: 35°35′47″N 81°36′00″W
- Area: 20,949 acres (8,478 ha)
- Established: 1975
- Administrator: North Carolina Division of Parks and Recreation
- Website: Official website

South Mountains State Park is a North Carolina state park in Burke County, North Carolina in the United States. Located near Connellys Springs, North Carolina, it covers 20,949 acres (84.78 km^{2}) and includes part of the South Mountains, the highest peaks in the foothills of the Blue Ridge Mountains. High Shoals Falls is the park's most visited feature.

== History ==
The South Mountains, carved out of the Blue Ridge by erosion, are a broad belt of peaks and knobs rising abruptly from a deep valley. These steep, rugged mountains encompass 100,000 acres (404 km^{2}) in Burke, Cleveland and Rutherford counties.

The Catawba Valley and the gaps across the mountain ranges to the west were once major travel routes. The South Mountains served as a buffer zone between the Cherokee and the Catawba Indians, and the first European settlers in the area farmed the fertile land along the Catawba River.

In 1828, gold was discovered at Brindle Creek. Legend holds that gold flakes and grains were first discovered in the mud used to seal a log cabin. The ensuing gold rush attracted immigrants, mining companies and slave owners. Gold was mined into the early 20th century, but activity in the gold mines eventually declined. Development of land in what is now South Mountains State Park began in the 1930s when Camp Dryer, a Civilian Conservation Corps (CCC) camp, was established at Enola. Those employed at the camp constructed forest service roads, cleaned stream beds and built a forest observation tower. The Lower and Upper CCC roads are still in use at the park today.

The park was established as a result of recommendations made by a National Park Service study conducted in coordination with the state of North Carolina. Though proposals for the park began in the 1940s, it was not until 1974 that funds were appropriated to purchase the land. The first land acquisition totaled 5779 (23.39 km^{2}) acres. Additional land has since been added, bringing the park to its present size of 20,949 acres (84.78 km^{2}).

While most of the high points average approximately 2000 feet (609 m) in elevation, Buzzard's Roost towers some 3000 feet (914 m) above the surrounding landscape. Elevations within the park itself range from less than 1200 feet (365 m) at points along Jacob's Fork River to 3,000 feet (914 m) on Buzzard's Roost along the park's western boundary.

Water winding through the park to the Catawba River cuts deep into the terrain, forming rugged and steep slopes. A significant feature in the park is High Shoals Falls on Jacob's Fork River. Here, a torrent of water drops 80 feet (24 m) over a cliff face of bare rock.

== Recreation ==
The park's recreational features include 47 miles of hiking trails, 17 miles of biking trails, and 25 miles equestrain trails plus opportunities for fishing, picnicking, and tent and trailer camping.
