= Long Island, North Carolina =

Long Island
- Populated place
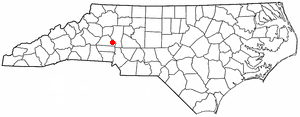
- Location of Long Island, North Carolina
- Coordinates: 35°40′40″N 80°59′36″W
- Country: United States
- State: North Carolina
- County: Catawba
- Elevation: 846 ft (258 m)
- Time zone: UTC-5 (Eastern (EST))
  - Summer (DST): UTC-4 (EDT)
- ZIP code: 28609
- Area code: 828
- GNIS feature ID: 1021277

Long Island is an unincorporated community in Catawba County, North Carolina, United States.

== History ==
Previously a milling town, the locale was flooded when a dam was built on the Catawba River to create Lake Norman in 1959.

John J. Shuford and Avery M. Powell built Long Island Mill in the early 1850s. Brothers Columbus and Wilfred Turner bought the mill in 1881. It was located "on a mile-long stretch of island in one of the river's wider spots". Columbus Turner built a house nearby which he called Mont Beaux, which the mill workers pronounced Monbo. Eventually, the Turners called their company Monbo Mill Company. In the late 1880s, they sold Long Island Mill to English businessman Jim Brown and focused on Monbo Mill.

Osborne Brown took over the Long Island Mill after his father';s death in 1894. The Turners expanded their operation into Iredell County and created the mill village of East Monbo. In 1910, they replaced a wooden dam which went across only part of the river to Goat Island, named for the wild goats in the area. The new concrete dam went all the way across the river. World War I helped the business succeed, as soldiers needed warm uniforms and blankets.

The idea for a dam on the Catawba River dated back to before 1900. Buck and Benjamin Duke saw dams on the Catawba as a way to help industry. Duke Power had planned for a dam in this area since the early 1920s, when the company bought Long Island Mill, Monbo Mill and other properties to prepare for the building of a new lake.

Superior Yarns Company operated Long Island Mill when it closed October 3, 1959 for the building of Lake Norman. 120 people worked in each of the mills at the time. The workers still lived in the mill villages for $1 per month and free electricity. Duke let the workers keep the homes if they could move them, since the entire area would soon be part of the lake.
