= McGalliard Falls =

- Interactive map of McGalliard Falls
- Location: McGalliard Falls Park, Valdese, Burke County, in North Carolina
- Coordinates: 35.765102°N 81.568762°W
- Type: Cascade
- Total height: 40 ft (12 m)

McGalliard Falls is a waterfall in Burke County, North Carolina.

== Geology ==
The waterfall is located on McGalliard Creek, where it flows over a large bedrock to a lower plunge pool.

== Natural history ==
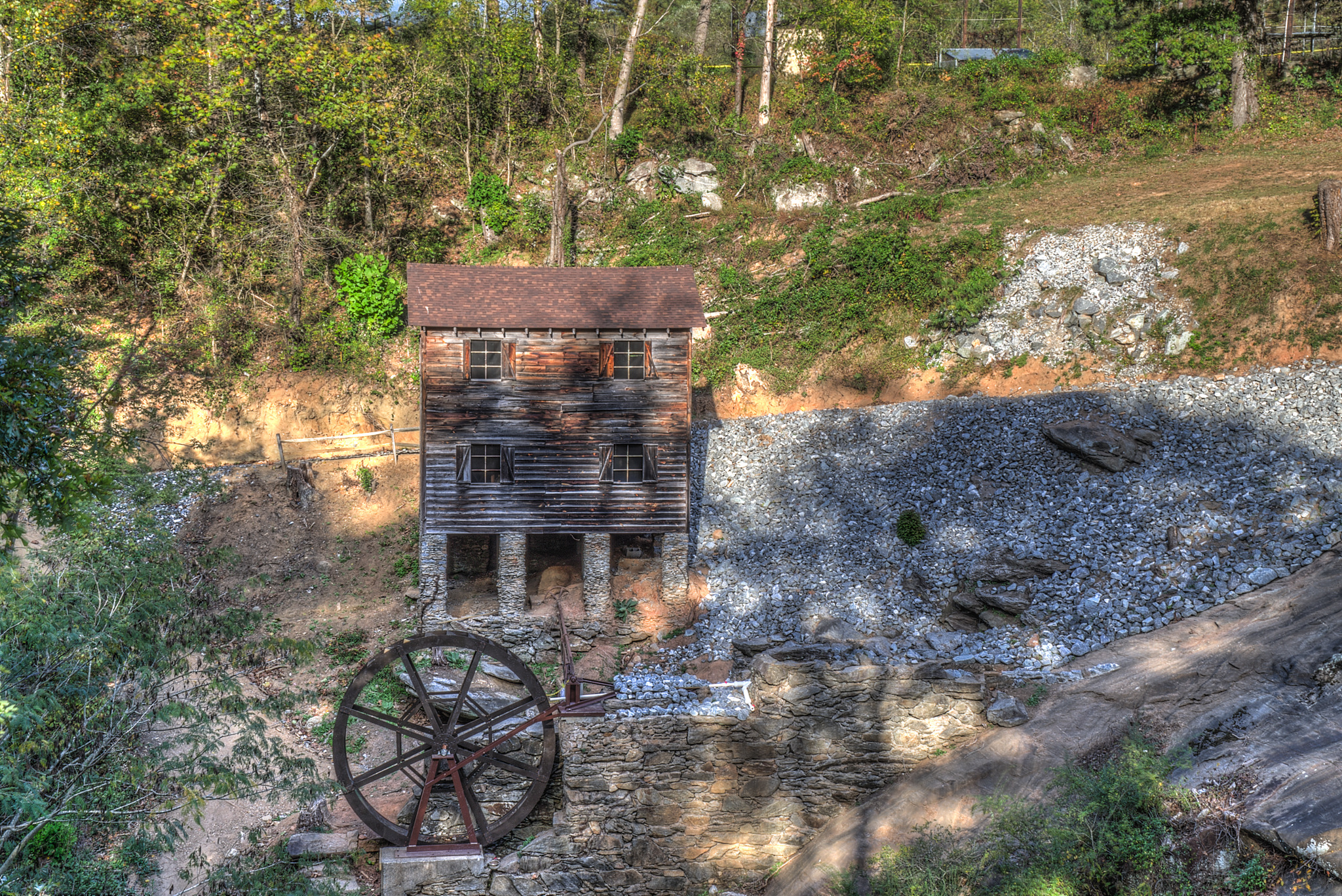
Meytre Grist Mill

The falls is owned by the town of Valdese, North Carolina, which has built a city park around the falls. The falls was the home to a mill called Meytre Grist Mill, which was built in 1906 by Fred Meytre. The mill remained in operation until 1941, when Mr. Meytre became too old to operate the mill without younger men, who were being called to serve during World War II. The mill was rebuilt in 1982 for the park.

== Visiting the falls ==
The falls is located at McGalliard Falls Park in Valdese, North Carolina. The park may be found by taking exit 112 off of Interstate 40 and going north to Main Street in Valdese. Head west on Main Street for .8 miles and turn right onto Church St. Go north 1.5 miles to the turn-in for the park on the right. There is a short path to the falls.

Visitors should obey all rules at the park concerning the falls, and should not swim near or above the falls.

== Nearby falls ==
- High Shoals Falls
- Catawba Falls
- Upper Catawba Falls

== See also ==
- List of waterfalls
- List of waterfalls in North Carolina
