= Loves Creek (Rocky River tributary) =

Stream in North Carolina, USA

Loves Creek Tributary to Rocky River
- Location of Loves Creek mouth Loves Creek (Rocky River tributary) (the United States)

Location
- Country: United States
- State: North Carolina
- County: Chatham
- City: Siler City

Physical characteristics
- Source: Brush Creek divide
  - location: pond about 3 miles south-southwest of Siler City, North Carolina
  - coordinates: 35°40′34″N 079°29′26″W
  - elevation: 705 ft (215 m)
- Mouth: Rocky River
  - location: about 1 mile east of Siler City, North Carolina
  - coordinates: 35°43′58″N 079°24′12″W
  - elevation: 488 ft (149 m)
- Length: 5.59 mi (9.00 km)
- Basin size: 8.19 square miles (21.2 km^{2})
- Discharge
  - location: Rocky River
  - average: 10.68 cu ft/s (0.302 m^{3}/s) at mouth with Rocky River

Basin features
- Progression: Rocky River → Deep River → Cape Fear River → Atlantic Ocean
- River system: Deep River
- Tributaries
  - left: unnamed tributaries
  - right: unnamed tributaries
- Bridges: Siler City-Glendon Road, Pine Forest South Drive, US 421 (S Chatham Avenue), S 2nd Avenue, US 421, Progress Boulevard

Loves Creek is a 5.59 mi (9.00 km) long 3rd order tributary to the Rocky River in Chatham County, North Carolina.

== Course ==
Loves Creek rises in a pond about 3 miles south-southwest of Siler City, North Carolina in Chatham County. Loves Creek then flows northeast through Siler City to join the Rocky River about 1 mile east of Siler City.

== Watershed ==
Loves Creek drains 8.19 square miles (21.2 km^{2}) of area, receives about 48.0 in/year of precipitation, has a wetness index of 428.39 and is about 40% forested.
