= Varnell Creek (Rocky River tributary) =

Stream in North Carolina, USA

Varnell Creek Tributary to Rocky River
- Location of Varnell Creek mouth Varnell Creek (Rocky River tributary) (the United States)

Location
- Country: United States
- State: North Carolina
- County: Chatham

Physical characteristics
- Source: Nick Creek divide
  - location: pond about 5 miles northeast of Siler City, North Carolina
  - coordinates: 35°47′35″N 079°23′51″W
  - elevation: 565 ft (172 m)
- Mouth: Rocky River
  - location: about 2 miles east of Siler City, North Carolina
  - coordinates: 35°43′35″N 079°23′51″W
  - elevation: 475 ft (145 m)
- Length: 6.88 mi (11.07 km)
- Basin size: 10.09 square miles (26.1 km^{2})
- Discharge
  - location: Rocky River
  - average: 12.99 cu ft/s (0.368 m^{3}/s) at mouth with Rocky River

Basin features
- Progression: Rocky River → Deep River → Cape Fear River → Atlantic Ocean
- River system: Deep River
- Tributaries
  - left: unnamed tributaries
  - right: unnamed tributaries
- Bridges: Silk Hope-Liberty Road, Still Waters Drive, Silk Hope Road, US 64, Stage Coach Road

Varnell Creek is a 6.88-mile (11.07 km) long 3rd order tributary to the Rocky River in Chatham County, North Carolina.

== Course ==
Varnell Creek rises about five miles (8.0 km) northeast of Siler City, North Carolina in Chatham County and then follows a southerly course to join the Rocky River about 2 miles east of Siler City.

== Watershed ==
Varnell Creek drains 10.09 square miles (26.1 km^{2}) of area, receives about 47.8 inches (1,210 mm) per year of precipitation, has a wetness index of 443.32 and is about 44% forested.
