= Dan McGalliard =

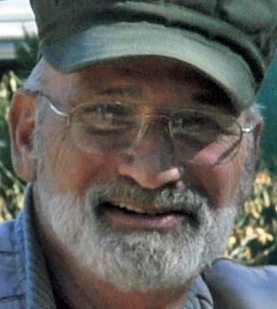
Dan McGalliard in 2010.

James Daniel McGalliard (July 7, 1940 – February 18, 2021), was an inventor and innovator of products and processes throughout a wide range of applications.

He became an industrialist during California’s electronic boom, where he developed inventions such as fluid sensitive micro-electrical switching circuitry and a patent for nylon hose.

== Solidstat ==
Dan McGalliard was the inventor of the Solidstat, a single mount electrical control assembly, and issued a U.S. patent February 8, 1978. The Solidstat is widely used for: resistance heater control, lighting control, motor speed control, pipe heating, tank & kettle heating, laminating press heater control, and medical equipment involving heating, lighting, and temperature controls. A single mounting connection at the potentiometer bushing not only mechanically mounts all of the elements but additionally provides a heat sink connection for the circuit. At the same time, the use of a printed circuit board in the combination permits automated assembly and soldering which substantially reduced the cost of the circuit.

== Other patents ==
Dan McGalliard was also issued other patents, mostly within the field of electrical engineering, including a solid state fluid sensitive switching member which utilizes fluid contained in a cavity to conduct the heat generated during high current switching operations away from the temperature-sensitive solid state elements of the switching member, issued March 14, 1977, and a printed circuit fuse assembly. issued October 20, 1981.

== Innovations ==
Outside the field of electrical engineering, Dan McGalliard was issued a patent on February 2, 1978, for nylon hose treated with a micro-encapsulation of hair-dissolving solution designed to remove hair from the legs of the wearer. In 2006, he developed a trailer delivery system for installing cement boat ramps, involving the laying of connected cement planks directly into the water, thereby not polluting the waters with dissolved cement mortar or having to construct coffer dams.

== Personal history ==
Dan McGalliard was born in Spear, North Carolina. His father was James Lafayette McGalliard, a rural North Carolina preacher, farm consultant, and graduate of Clemson University. Along with his father and mother, Edna Loy McGalliard, and his brother, David McGalliard moved to just outside Glen Alpine in Burke County, North Carolina where they owned and operated a dairy farm. Dan McGalliard also raised hogs and attended Oak Hill School, where he was honored for his athletic achievements on the football field and for graduating without missing a single day of school from first grade to high school graduation.

== Professional development ==
Dan McGalliard attended UCLA and worked in the field of electronics in California. In 1971 he opened his own company: Electramation with the tagline Innovations in Automation. The company represented controls to OEMs (original equipment manufacturers) throughout California. In the course of representing and selling products, McGalliard often encountered design challenges of his customers. He gradually began to design and invent products to solve those challenges for his customers. His company became a manufacturer of proprietary products, usually farming out the assembly to associate companies. Proprietary products, as well as products sold by his company, Electramation, were often featured in the electronic Journals of the time. One of his product designs, the C-Pak, was the Product Design and Development - News for the Original Equipment Market editor's front cover featured product on the June 1981 issue, and was described as "gating SCRs, not subject to line-borne-noise, which the company calls "regenerative gating" and displays a noteworthy thermal design”.

== See also ==
- Innovator
- List of people from North Carolina
