= Meadow Creek (Rocky River tributary) =

Stream in North Carolina, USA

Meadow Creek Tributary to Rocky River
- Location of Meadow Creek mouth Meadow Creek (Rocky River tributary) (the United States)

Location
- Country: United States
- State: North Carolina
- County: Chatham

Physical characteristics
- Source: Loves Creek divide
  - location: about 1.5 miles southeast of Siler City, North Carolina
  - coordinates: 35°42′11″N 079°25′51″W
  - elevation: 625 ft (191 m)
- Mouth: Rocky River
  - location: about 3.5 miles southeast of Siler City, North Carolina
  - coordinates: 35°41′41″N 079°21′42″W
  - elevation: 425 ft (130 m)
- Length: 4.70 mi (7.56 km)
- Basin size: 5.68 square miles (14.7 km^{2})
- Discharge
  - location: Rocky River
  - average: 7.40 cu ft/s (0.210 m^{3}/s) at mouth with Rocky River

Basin features
- Progression: Rocky River → Deep River → Cape Fear River → Atlantic Ocean
- River system: Deep River
- Tributaries
  - left: unnamed tributaries
  - right: unnamed tributaries
- Bridges: US 421, Meadow Creek Road, Sam Fields Road, Rives Chapel Church Road

Meadow Creek is a 4.70 mi (7.56 km) long 3rd order tributary to the Rocky River in Chatham County, North Carolina.

== Course ==
Meadow Creek rises about 1.5 miles southeast of Siler City, North Carolina in Chatham County and then flows southeast to join the Rocky River about 3.5 miles southwest of Siler City.

== Watershed ==
Meadow Creek drains 5.68 square miles (14.7 km^{2}) of area, receives about 47.8 in/year of precipitation, has a wetness index of 423.48 and is about 54% forested.
