= Harlands Creek =

Stream in North Carolina, US

Harlands Creek Tributary to Rocky River
- Location of Harlands Creek mouth Harlands Creek (the United States)

Location
- Country: United States
- State: North Carolina
- County: Chatham

Physical characteristics
- Source: Dry Creek divide
  - location: about 1.5 miles west of Gum Springs, North Carolina
  - coordinates: 35°45′55″N 079°16′33″W
  - elevation: 540 ft (160 m)
- Mouth: Rocky River
  - location: about 5 miles southwest of Pittsboro, North Carolina
  - coordinates: 35°39′35″N 079°15′15″W
  - elevation: 318 ft (97 m)
- Length: 10.34 mi (16.64 km)
- Basin size: 15.76 square miles (40.8 km^{2})
- Discharge
  - location: Rocky River
  - average: 18.88 cu ft/s (0.535 m^{3}/s) at mouth with Rocky River

Basin features
- Progression: Rocky River → Deep River → Cape Fear River → Atlantic Ocean
- River system: Deep River
- Tributaries
  - left: unnamed tributaries
  - right: unnamed tributaries
- Bridges: Carroll Farm Road, Buckner Creek Road, E Alston Road, Renaissance Drive, Harlands Creek Drive, US 64, Alston Chapel Road, NC 902

Harlands Creek is a 10.34 mi (16.64 km) long 3rd order tributary to the Rocky River in Chatham County, North Carolina. This is the only stream of this name in the United States.

== Variant names ==
According to the Geographic Names Information System, it has also been known historically as:

- Hollands Creek

== Course ==
Harlands Creek rises about 1.5 miles west of Gum Springs, North Carolina in Chatham County and then flows south to join the Rocky River about 5 miles southwest of Pittsboro.

== Watershed ==
Harlands Creek drains 15.76 square miles (40.8 km^{2}) of area, receives about 47.4 in/year of precipitation, and has a wetness index of 431.04 and is about 77% forested.
