= Rhodhiss Lake =

Coordinates: 35°46′39″N 81°32′51″W

- Aerial image of the lake.
- Interactive map of Rhodhiss Lake
- Location: Burke County
- Type: Lake
- Part of: Catawba Basin
- Built: C. 1925
- Surface area: 1,423 ha (3,520 acres)
- Average depth: 100 ft (30 m)

Rhodhiss Lake is a lake in Burke County, North Carolina. It is an impoundment of the Catawba River. It was formed in 1925 after a dam was set up.

== Geography ==
The lake covers about 1,423 hectares (5.49 sq mi), almost entirely inside of Burke County. Several rivers and creeks flow into Rhodhiss, including Catawba River and Johns River. It drains out over 1,095 square miles. The average depth is about 100 feet, with tides going in and out. The town of Rhodhiss is nearby.

== History ==
In 1925, The Rhodhiss Dam was constructed, creating the lake.
