= Dry Creek (Haw River tributary) =

Stream in North Carolina, USA

Dry Creek Tributary to Haw River
- Location of Dry Creek mouth Dry Creek (Haw River tributary) (the United States)

Location
- Country: United States
- State: North Carolina
- County: Chatham

Physical characteristics
- Source: divide between Harlands Creek and Landrum Creek (Rocky River)
  - location: about 4 miles south-southeast of Silk Hope, North Carolina
  - coordinates: 35°44′39″N 079°21′10″W
  - elevation: 630 ft (190 m)
- Mouth: Haw River
  - location: about 2 miles northwest of Bynum, North Carolina
  - coordinates: 35°47′44″N 079°10′54″W
  - elevation: 338 ft (103 m)
- Length: 12.89 mi (20.74 km)
- Basin size: 20.21 square miles (52.3 km^{2})
- Discharge
  - location: Haw River
  - average: 24.47 cu ft/s (0.693 m^{3}/s) at mouth with Haw River

Basin features
- Progression: Haw River → Cape Fear River → Atlantic Ocean
- River system: Haw River
- Tributaries
  - left: Long Branch
  - right: unnamed tributaries
- Bridges: Harold Hackney Road, Bowers Store Road, Silk Hope Gum Springs Road, Graham Road (NC 87), Old Graham Road

Dry Creek is a 12.89 mi (20.74 km) long 2nd order tributary to the Haw River in Chatham County, North Carolina.

== Course ==
Dry Creek rises about 4 miles south-southeast of Silk Hope, North Carolina in Chatham County and then flows northeast to the Haw River upstream of Bynum.

== Watershed ==
Dry Creek drains 20.21 square miles (52.3 km^{2}) of area, receives about 47.4 in/year of precipitation, and has a wetness index of 430.05 and is about 60% forested.

== See also ==
- List of rivers of North Carolina

== Additional maps ==
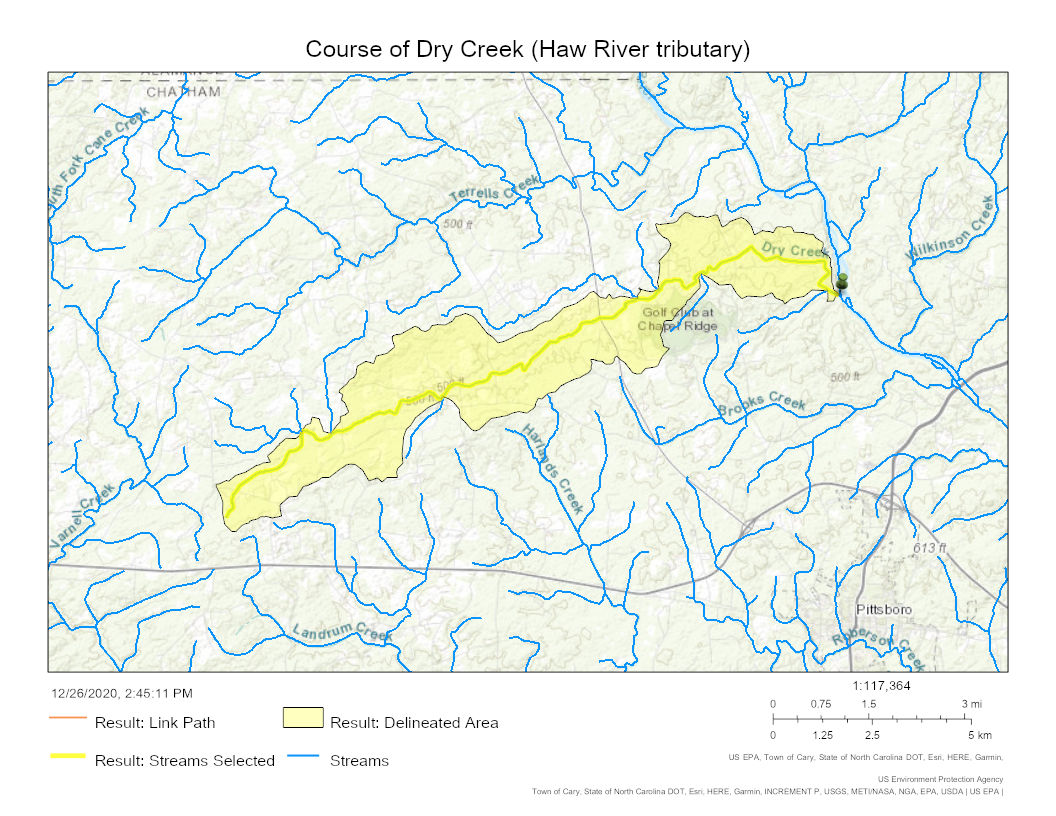
Course of Dry Creek (Haw River tributary) in Chatham County, North Carolina

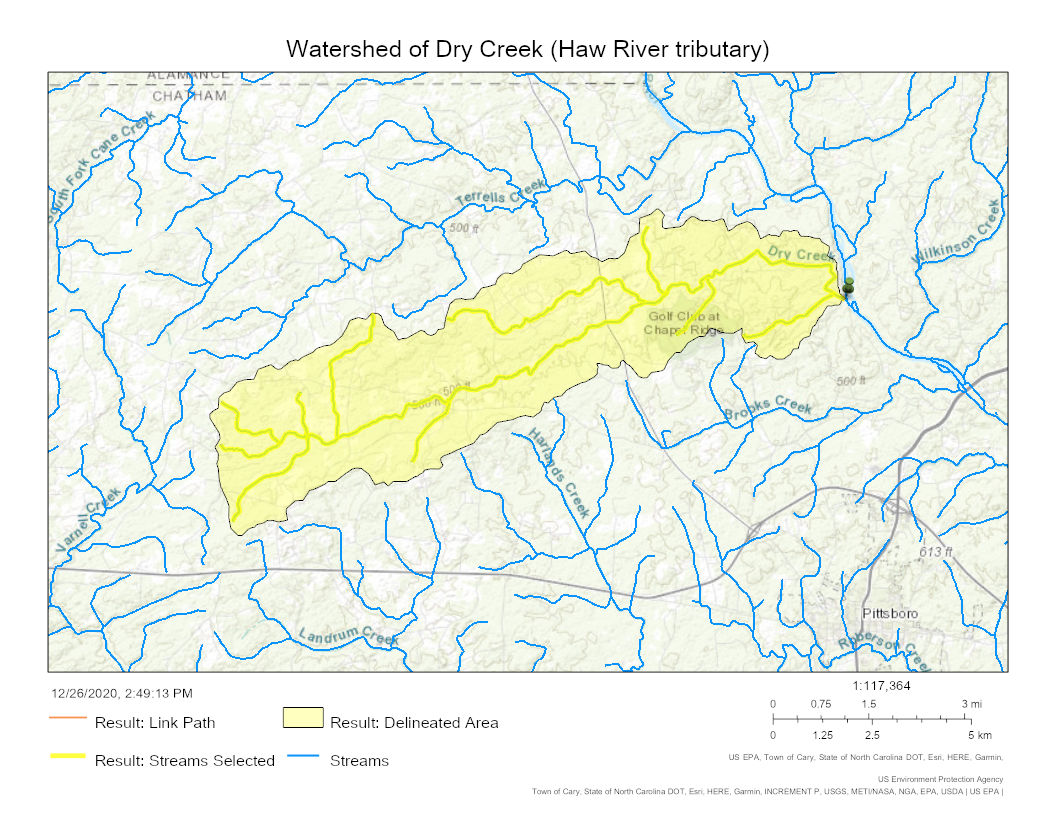
Watershed of Dry Creek (Haw River tributary) in Chatham County, North Carolina
