= Sandy Creek (Deep River tributary) =

Stream in North Carolina, USA

Sandy Creek Tributary to Deep River
- Location of Sandy Creek mouth Sandy Creek (Deep River tributary) (the United States)

Location
- Country: United States
- State: North Carolina
- County: Randolph; Guilford
- City: Ramseur

Physical characteristics
- Source: Climax Creek divide
  - location: Pond about 1 mile east of Climax, North Carolina
  - coordinates: 35°54′39″N 079°41′23″W
  - elevation: 805 ft (245 m)
- Mouth: Deep River
  - location: Ramseur, North Carolina
  - coordinates: 35°45′55″N 079°40′18″W
  - elevation: 435 ft (133 m)
- Length: 19.94 mi (32.09 km)
- Basin size: 60.03 square miles (155.5 km^{2})
- Discharge
  - location: Deep River
  - average: 67.94 cu ft/s (1.924 m^{3}/s) at mouth with Deep River

Basin features
- Progression: Rocky River → Deep River → Cape Fear River → Atlantic Ocean
- River system: Deep River
- Tributaries
  - left: Boodum Creek; Mount Pleasant Creek
  - right: unnamed tributaries
- Bridges: Old Red Cross Road, Hollow Hill Road, Ramseur-Julian Road, US 421 (x2), Old Liberty Road, Ramseur-Julian Road, Kidds Mill Road, Low Bridge Road, Mulberry Academy Street, E Main Street, US 64-NC 49

Sandy Creek is a 19.94 mi (32.09 km) long 4th order tributary to the Deep River in Guilford and Randolph Counties, North Carolina. The Battle of the Mouth of Sandy Creek occurred at the mouth of this creek in July 1781.

== Course ==
Sandy Creek rises in a pond about 1 mile east of Climax, North Carolina in Guilford County and then flows south into Randolph County to join the Deep River in Ramseur, North Carolina.

== Watershed ==
Sandy Creek drains 60.03 square miles (155.5 km^{2}) of area, receives about 46.8 in/year of precipitation, and has a wetness index of 393.40 and is about 48% forested.

== See also ==
- List of rivers of North Carolina
