= Catawba River =

River in North Carolina and South Carolina, United States

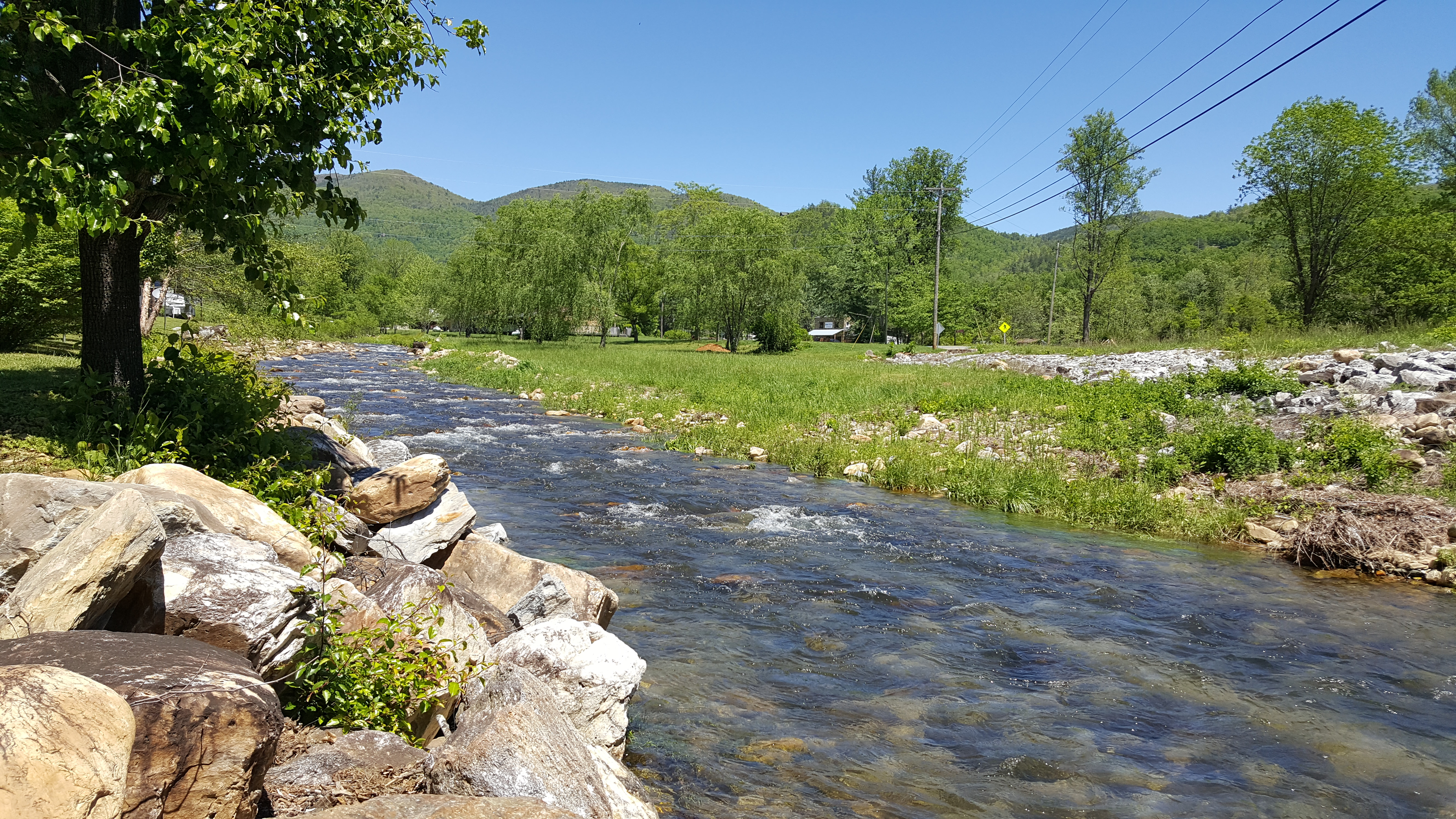
- A view of the Catawba River in McDowell County, North Carolina

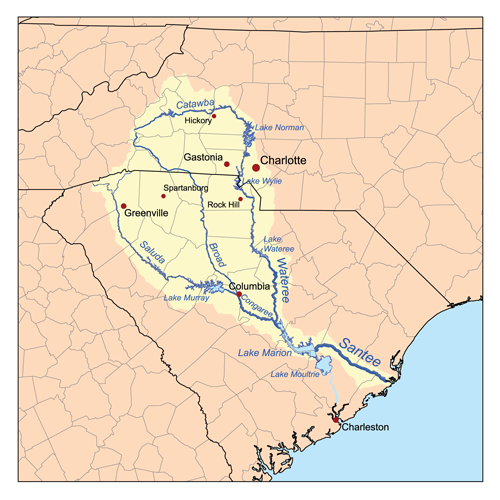
- Map of the Santee River watershed showing the Catawba River

- Location of the mouth of the Catawba River in South Carolina
- Etymology: Named after the Catawba Indians
- Native name: Eswa taroa / Iswą katabare (Catawba)

Location
- Country: United States
- States: North Carolina, South Carolina
- Counties: McDowell NC, Caldwell NC, Burke NC, Alexander NC, Catawba NC, Iredell NC, Lincoln NC, Gaston NC, Mecklenburg NC, York SC, Lancaster SC, Fairfield SC

Physical characteristics
- Source: Evans Knob
  - location: Ridgecrest, North Carolina
  - coordinates: 35°36′04″N 82°17′06″W
  - elevation: 3,044 ft (928 m)
- Mouth: Wateree River
  - location: Liberty Hill, South Carolina
  - coordinates: 34°28′01″N 80°53′20″W
  - elevation: 223 ft (68 m)

Basin features
- Progression: Catawba → Wateree → Santee → Atlantic Ocean
- River system: Catawba River
- Waterbodies: Lake James, Rhodhiss Lake, Lake Hickory, Lookout Shoals Lake, Lake Norman, Mountain Island Lake, Lake Wylie, Fishing Creek Reservoir, Great Falls Reservoir, Cedar Creek Reservoir, Lake Wateree
- Waterfalls: Catawba Falls

The Catawba River is a major river located in the Southeastern United States. It originates in Western North Carolina and flows into South Carolina, where it later becomes known as the Wateree River. The river is approximately 220 miles (350 km) long. It rises in the Appalachian Mountains and drains into the Piedmont, where it has been impounded through a series of reservoirs for flood control and generation of hydroelectricity. The river is named after the Catawba tribe of Native Americans, which lives on its banks. In their language, they call themselves "yeh is-WAH h’reh", meaning "people of the river."

The river rises in the Blue Ridge Mountains in western McDowell County, North Carolina, approximately 20 miles (30 km) east of Asheville. It flows east-northeast, falling over two waterfalls, Upper Catawba Falls and Catawba Falls, before being dammed by Lake James, and joining the Linville River. It passes north of Morganton, then southeast through Lake Rhodhiss and Lake Hickory just north of Hickory, and into the Lake Norman reservoir. From Lake Norman it flows south, passing west of Charlotte, then flowing through the Mountain Island Lake and Lake Wylie reservoirs, where it exits the reservoirs approximately 10 miles (15 km) south of the border between North Carolina and South Carolina. The confluence of the South Fork Catawba River and Catawba River is submerged by Lake Wylie near the NC/SC state line.

The river flows into northern South Carolina, passing Rock Hill, through Fishing Creek Reservoir near Great Falls, and into the Lake Wateree reservoir, approximately 30 miles (50 km) northeast of Columbia. At the now-submerged confluence with Wateree Creek, it becomes known as the Wateree River.

== Dams ==
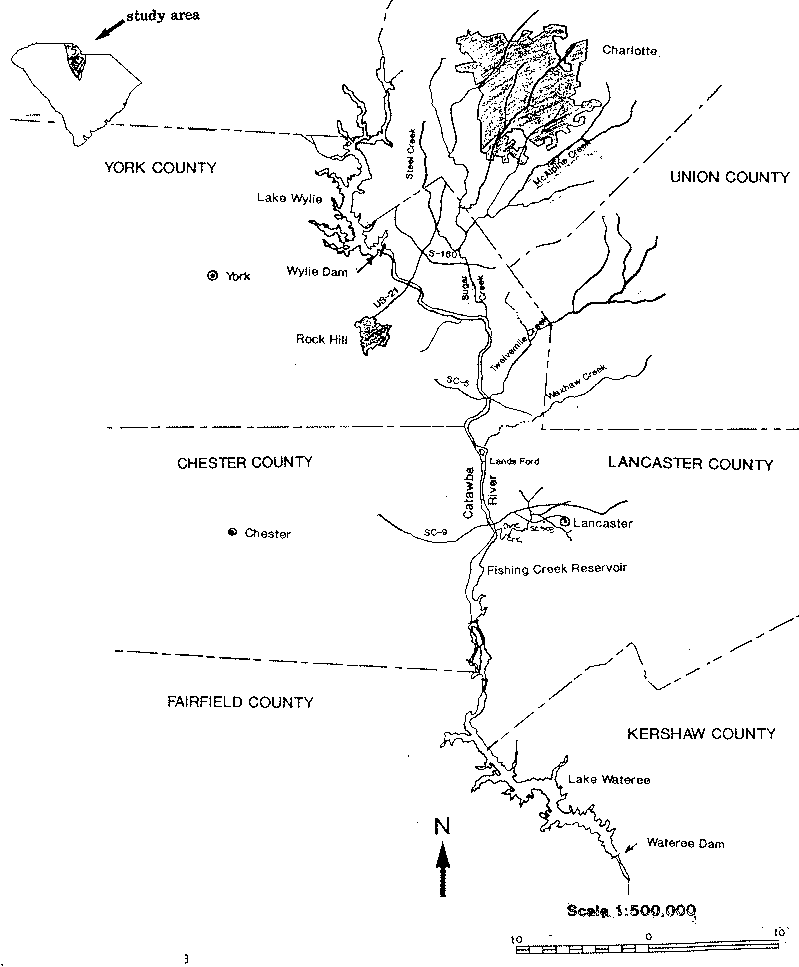
Map of the Catawba River in South Carolina

The Catawba has been controlled by several dams, including the following:

North Carolina

- Lake James Dam
- Rhodhiss Dam
- Oxford Dam
- Lookout Shoals Dam
- Cowans Ford Dam, creating Lake Norman
- Mountain Island Lake Dam

South Carolina

- Lake Wylie Dam in India Hook
- Fishing Creek Reservoir in Great Falls
- Dearborn-Great Falls Dam
- Cedar Creek Reservoir Dam
- Lake Wateree Dam

== Headwaters and basin ==
The Catawba basin begins on the eastern slopes of the Blue Ridge Mountains, North Carolina, near Evans Knob and Cross Mountain, at the edge of Pisgah National Forest. The Broad River begins collecting water on mountain slopes just to the south, with the two rivers waters meeting up again at the confluence of the Wateree and Congaree Rivers near Wateree, South Carolina.

== Controversy ==
In 2006 the river became the center of a water use controversy between the residents of the Catawba watershed and Cabarrus County, North Carolina. The cities of Concord and Kannapolis are expecting a daily shortfall of 22 million US gallons (83,000 m^{3}) of water a day by 2035 in their Rocky River watershed and want to pump up to 36 million US gallons (140,000 m^{3}) of water daily from the Catawba River. The Concord/Kannapolis Interbasin Transfer (IBT) proposal calls for water to be permanently transferred from one river basin to another river basin. Such a transfer is unlike the more common water usage, in which municipalities within the Catawba basin pump water from the river and treat it for residential use. Much of that treated water eventually returns to the Catawba River.

Though neither Concord nor Kannapolis is located in the Catawba River basin (both are located in the Rocky River branch of the larger Pee Dee River basin), the cities said the Catawba River is a regional resource. Opponents of the IBT argued that towns and cities along the Catawba River basin are growing as well, and that the cities' request is too large.

On January 10, 2007, the North Carolina state environmental panel authorized Concord and Kannapolis to pump up to 10 million US gallons (38,000 m^{3}) a day from the Catawba River. This decision represented a compromise recommended by hearing officers for the Environmental Management Commission. The mayors of Morganton and Valdese said that they were adamantly against the transfer and that the panel's ruling was skewed and biased. Concord's city manager said the approval of the water transfer was "bittersweet", since the panel authorized an amount much lower than was originally requested and the action is likely to be delayed by lawsuits.

“Well, (officials from) Hickory are going to file an appeal,” said Concord Mayor Scott Padgett, who spoke briefly with Hickory Mayor Rudy Wright after the EMC meeting. “His major concern is changing the (interbasin transfer) process. My appeal to him is that there should be a truce. To file an appeal is just going to prolong something we deserve, is less than what we asked for and is going to further hard feelings this has already created.”

The controversy ended in early 2010 when all the parties reached a settlement. It further limits the amount of water available to Concord and Kannapolis under drought conditions.

== A river at risk ==
Starting in the early autumn months of 2007, residents and businesses of the Catawba basin, along with large swaths of the Southern United States, began to feel the effects of an extreme drought. On October 15, 2007, the Morganton News Herald reported that North Carolina Governor Mike Easley described the drought as "the worst in recorded history".

On January 29, 2008, Duke Energy, the utility responsible for managing the Catawba River, extended its estimated time frame for Stage 4 water restrictions to August. The extension was possible because of conservation measures and the 6 inches of rain the basin received in December. However, area leaders converged on Valdese to hear presentations from representatives of the N.C. Rural Center, N.C. Department of Commerce, N.C. Department of Environment and Natural Resources, and the Appalachian Regional Commission about grants and loans available to help pay for solutions to the drought.

In April 2008 the environmental group American Rivers named the Catawba-Wateree River "the most endangered river in America." Reasons cited for the river's condition are the drought, the presence of 11 hydroelectric dams, global warming, and unchecked development along its banks, with the latter reported as the most serious threat.

On June 11, 2008, South Carolina Governor Mark Sanford signed legislation denoting the Catawba as a state scenic river. The designation carries no land-use restrictions, but it allows the state to convene an advisory group to address river-related concerns.

On June 29, 2009, the EPA announced that four of the top 44 "High Hazard Ash Ponds" in the United States are on the Catawba River. Two ash ponds are adjacent to and discharge into Mountain Island Lake. The EPA High Hazard list also includes ash ponds on Lake Wylie and Lake Norman.

On December 11, 2014, Duke Energy received approval from North Carolina to dump coal ash (containing arsenic, lead, thallium and mercury, among other heavy metals) from the Marshall Steam Station into Lake Norman in order to repair a rusted, leaking pipe at their facility. Groundwater at the Marshall Steam Station flows toward Lake Norman, and the contaminated field abuts the lake for about 30 feet of shoreline near its largest coal ash basin, threatening water quality in the lake.

On October 3, 2015, Duke Energy reported that a sinkhole had formed at the base of the Marshall Steam Station dam north of Charlotte on Lake Norman. The Department of Environmental Quality (DEQ) says Duke Energy placed a liner in the hole and filled it with crushed stone.

The Catawba River basin is one of only four areas left in the southeast with significant populations of Hymenocallis coronaria, the Shoals spider lily. It has one large population left at Landsford Canal State Park.

== Crossings ==
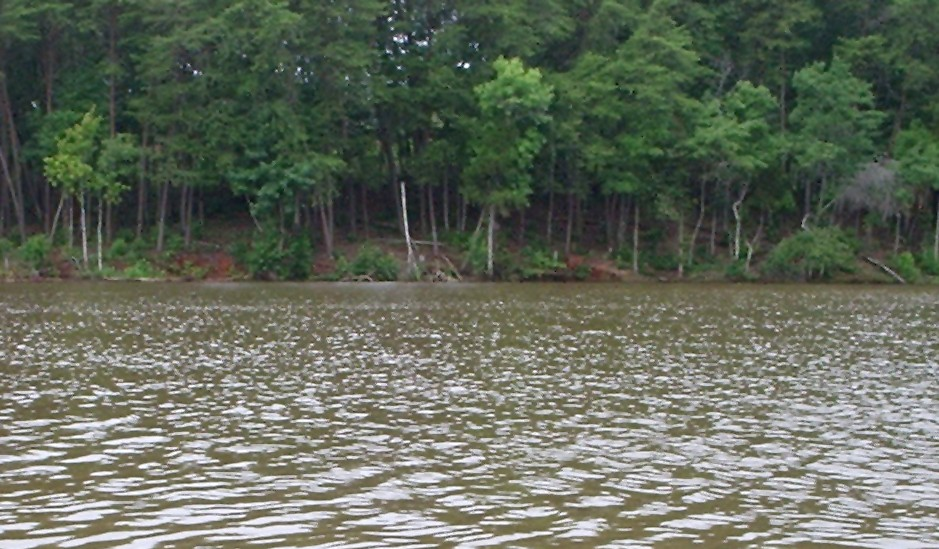
On the Catawba River

The Catawba River is crossed by many highways over its course. (Note: this list may be incomplete)

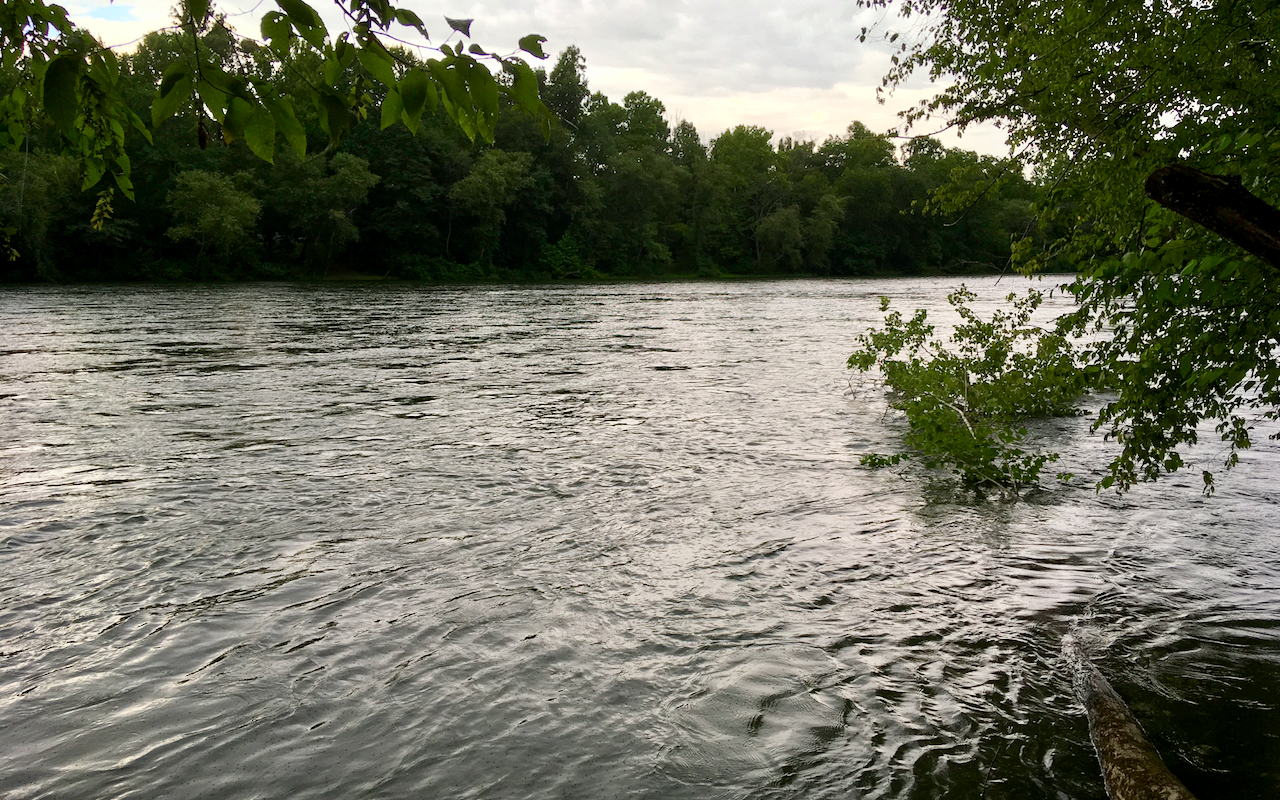
Catawba River in Catawba County

North Carolina

- Lake James to Rhodhiss Lake
  - Power House Road bridge, near Glen Alpine
  - Watermill Glen Alpine Road bridge, near Glen Alpine
  - Independence Boulevard bridge, in Morganton
  - NC 181 bridge, in Morganton
  - US 64 bridge, in Morganton
  - Huffman Bridge, near Amherst
  - Castle Bridge, near Rutherford College
- Rhodhiss Lake to Lake Norman
  - Burke Street/Caldwell Drive bridge, in Rhodhiss
  - US 321 bridge, near Hickory
  - NC 127 bridge, near Hickory
  - NC 16 bridge, near Conover
  - Cecil H. Hoffman Bridge (I-40), near Catawba
  - US 70 bridge, near Catawba
  - Buffalo Shoals Road/Hudson Chapel Road bridge, near Long Island
  - NC 150 bridge, near Terrell
- Lake Norman to Lake Wylie
  - NC 73 bridge, near Lowesville
  - Rozzelle's Ferry Bridge (NC 16), near Mountain Island
  - Randy M. Pendleton Memorial Bridge (NC 27), near Mount Holly
  - Cameron Morrison Bridge (I-85), near Belmont
  - Sloans Ferry Bridge (US 29/US 74), near Belmont
  - Buster Boyd Bridge (NC 49/SC 49), near Lake Wylie

South Carolina

- Lake Wylie to Lake Wateree
  - John McKee Spratt Memorial Bridge (I-77), near Rock Hill
  - Thomas B. Spratt Memorial Bridge (US 21), near Rock Hill
  - SC 5 bridge, near Catawba
  - Roach S. Stewart Memorial Bridge (SC 9), near Fort Lawn
  - Tom G. Mangum Bridge (SC 97/SC 200), near Great Falls

== See also ==
- List of North Carolina rivers
- List of South Carolina rivers
- U.S. National Whitewater Center
