= Meadow Creek (New River tributary) =

Stream in West Virginia, U.S.

Coordinates: 37°48′40″N 80°55′36″W

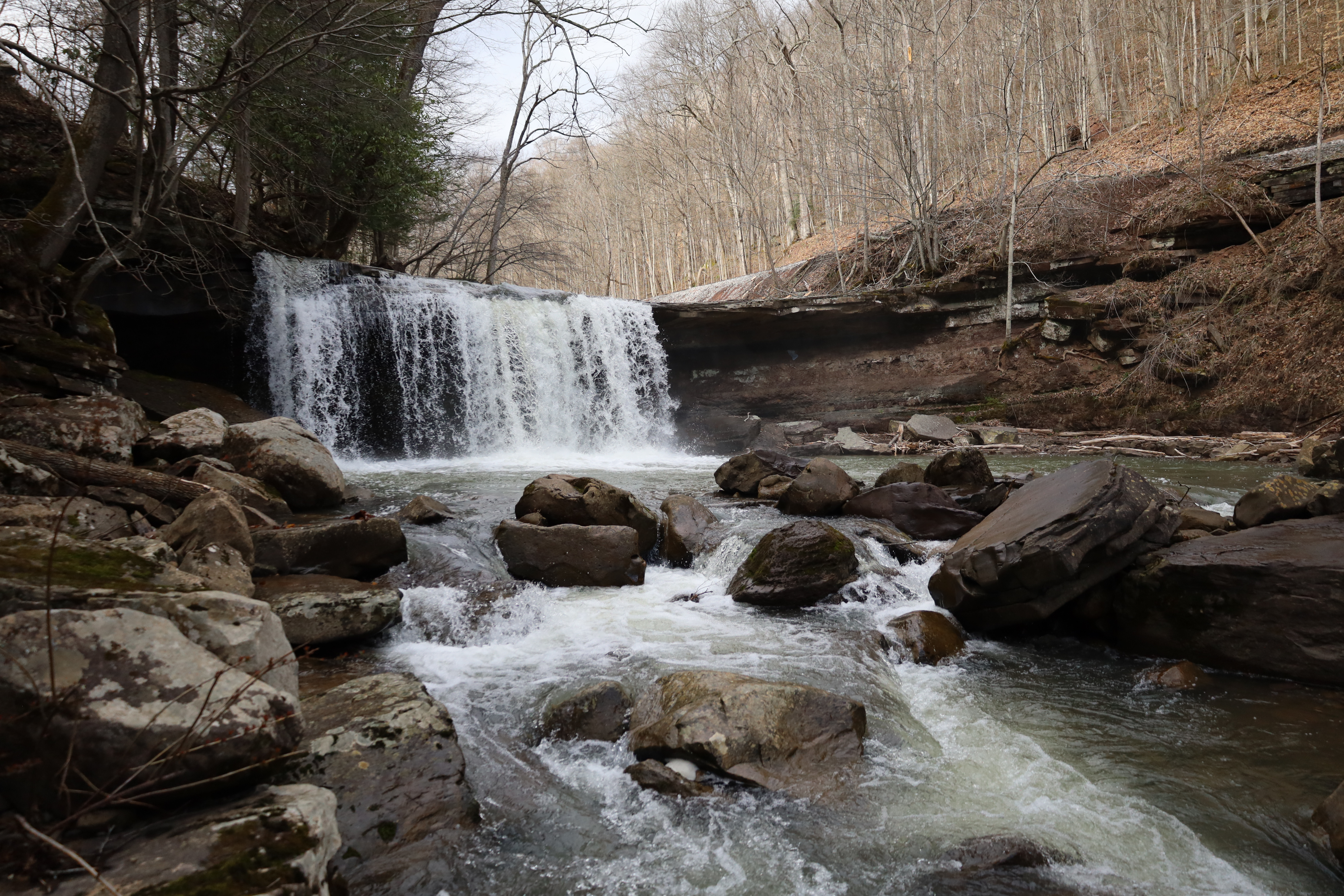
Meadow Creek Falls in 2022

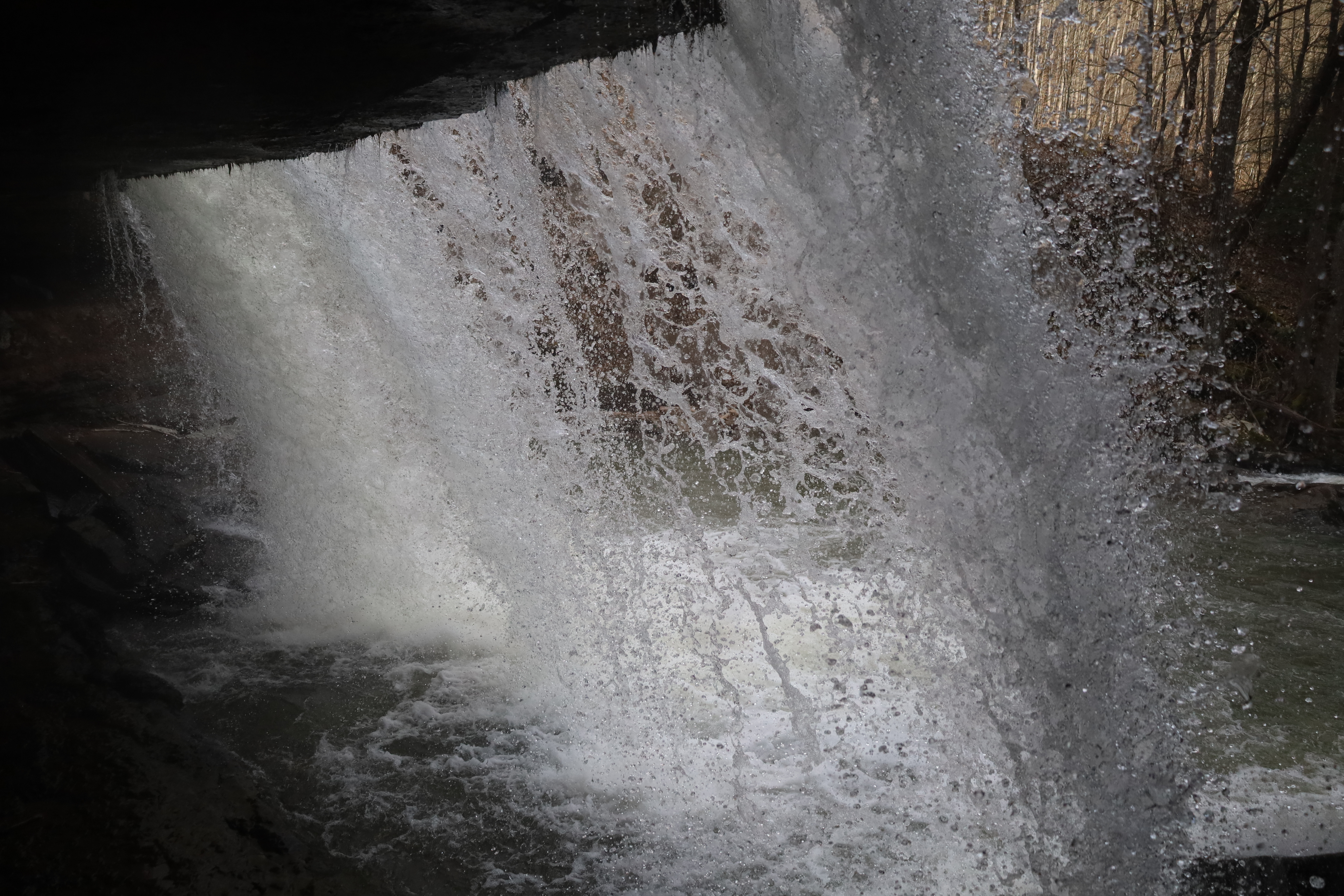
Meadow Creek Falls from behind in 2022

Meadow Creek is a stream in the U.S. state of West Virginia.

Meadow Creek was named for the flat meadows along its course.

== See also ==
- List of rivers of West Virginia
