= Catawba Falls =

Series of waterfalls in North Carolina, United States

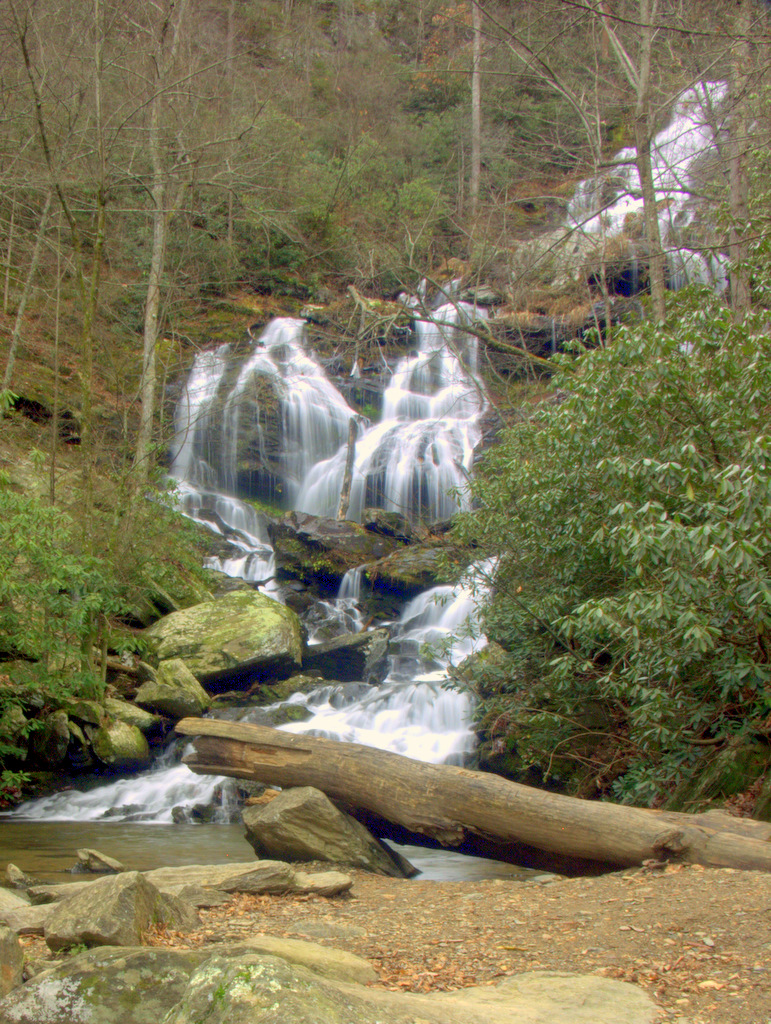
- Catawba Falls, December 2009
- Interactive map of Catawba Falls
- Location: McDowell County, in the Blue Ridge Mountains of North Carolina
- Coordinates: 35.603858°N 82.245154°W
- Type: Cascade
- Total height: 100 ft (30 m) (estimated)
- Number of drops: 2

Upper Catawba Falls
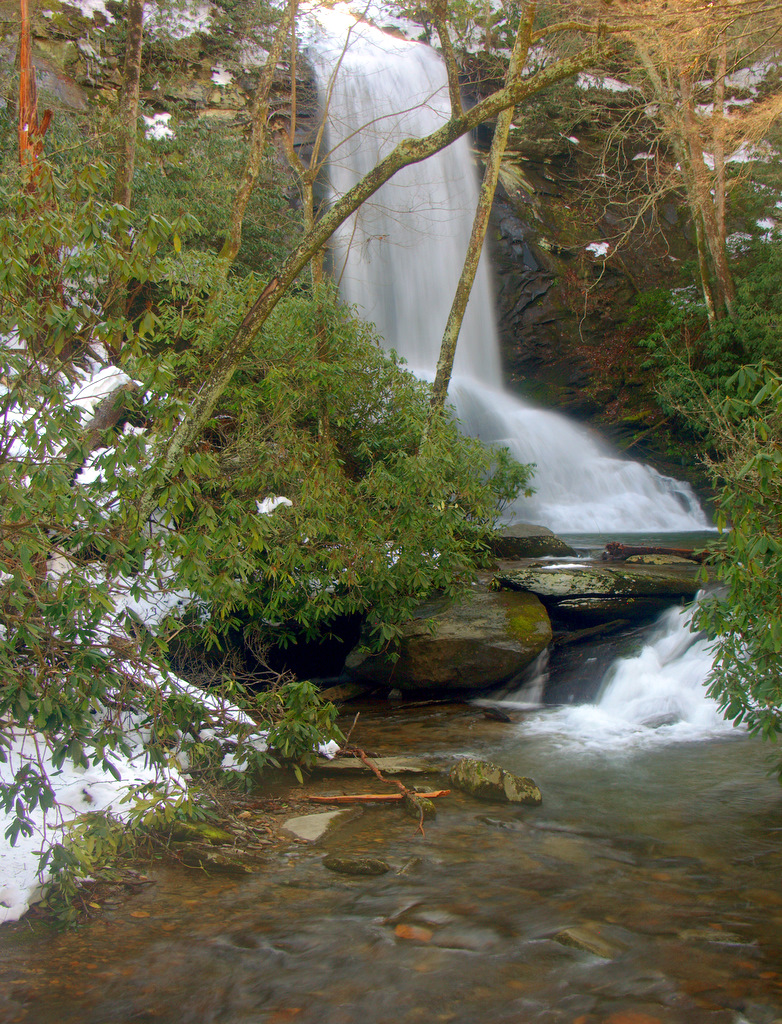
- Upper Catawba Falls, December 2009
- Interactive map of Upper Catawba Falls
- Location: McDowell County, in the Blue Ridge Mountains of North Carolina
- Coordinates: 35.603858°N 82.245154°W
- Type: Cascade
- Total height: 100 ft (30 m) (estimated)
- Number of drops: 2

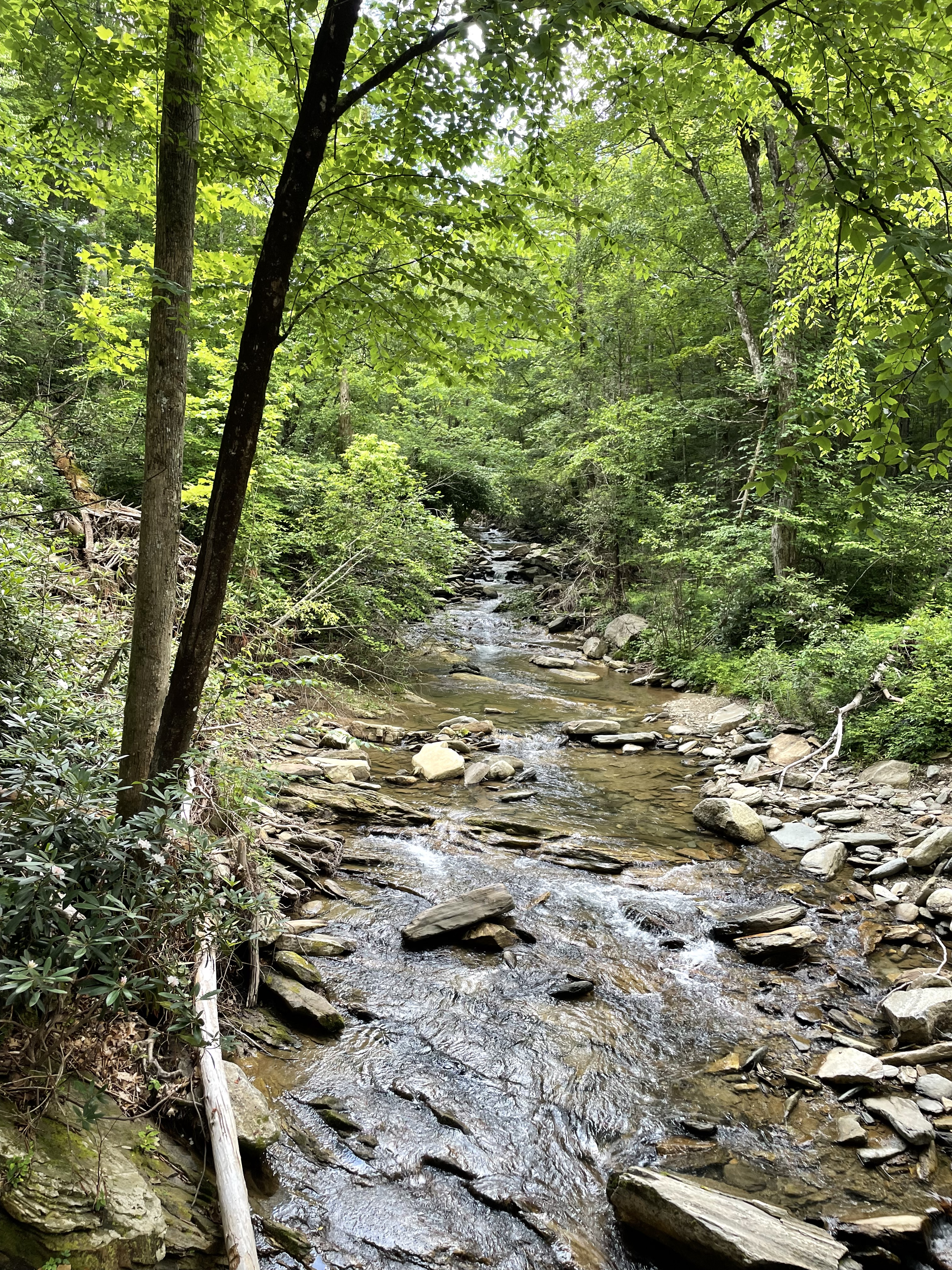
Lower Catawba Falls

Catawba Falls is a series of waterfalls on the headwaters of the Catawba River, in McDowell County, near Old Fort, North Carolina.

== Geology ==
The Catawba River flows over 2 major waterfalls in a short distance. The first drop, called Upper Catawba Falls, consists of an upper free-fall drop, while the second drop a short distance downstream, often called just Catawba Falls, is a higher series of free-falls and cascades.

== History ==
Catawba Falls is part of the Pisgah National Forest. For many years, while the falls were located on public land, visitor access to the falls was heavily restricted. The only access points to the falls were a trail that went through private property, and an access point off of Interstate 40. Use of either access point was illegal.

In 2005 and 2007, the Foothills Conservancy of North Carolina purchased 88 acres (360,000 m^{2}) of land at the end of Catawba River Road for a trailhead. In 2010, after Congressional approval the property was transferred to the US Forest Service and access to the falls was officially opened to the public. In 2012, a new parking area was built by the Forest Service. The Forest Service plans further improvements, including a foot bridge over a tricky crossing of the river along the trail and a new trail to the upper falls, bypassing a section considered steep and dangerous.

While Hurricane Helene caused significant damage to the area, Catawba Falls and the parking area are currently open. The trail was closed for major renovations beginning in May 2022 as part of a long-term project to improve safety and accessibility. This project included construction of retaining walls, boardwalks, 580 stairs, and overlooks, and ultimately a 60-foot observation tower to reach the upper falls.

In March 2023, the U.S. Forest Service announced that the closure would be extended through spring 2024 to complete the work.

After nearly two years of construction, the Catawba Falls Trail officially reopened on May 31, 2024. The reopening included the new staircases, overlooks, and the observation tower, allowing safer and more accessible access to both lower and upper falls via a loop trail of about 3.5 miles.

Shortly after its reopening, portions of the trail were damaged by Hurricane Helene in late September 2024. Heavy rainfall and high water caused washouts, fallen trees, and destruction of improvements at the base of the upper falls, including some overlook structures. While the primary stair and tower structures remained intact, damage to sections of the trail necessitated further repairs.

In January 2025, the Grandfather Ranger District announced that the Catawba Falls Trail had reopened as part of a broader reopening of 64 miles of trails after storm impacts; however, the upper viewing platform and the Wildflower Trail remained closed for continued repairs.

As of late 2025, the entire Catawba Falls loop trail is open, but the upper viewing platform and Wildflower Trail remain closed following storm damage, with additional repairs ongoing.

== Incidents and fatalities ==
Although Catawba Falls is a popular hiking destination, parts of the terrain—especially near the upper falls above the main cascade—are steep, slippery, and hazardous. Multiple serious injuries and occasional fatalities have occurred when visitors ventured off the established trail or climbed on unstable rock near the waterfall edges.

=== Recorded fatalities ===
- June 24, 2017 – Adam Music (22), of Nebo, North Carolina, fell approximately 70 feet from Upper Catawba Falls. He was with friends when he slipped and fell from a rocky area above the falls and was later pronounced dead after being transported from the scene by emergency responders. The incident was reported by local news outlets.
- February 24, 2018 – Jimmy Paul Schmidt Jr. (37), visiting from Georgia, died after falling from Upper Catawba Falls. The U.S. Forest Service confirmed this fatality and noted it was at least the second death in less than a year at the upper falls area. Officials had previously warned hikers to avoid the steeper sections above Lower Catawba Falls due to the risk of serious injury or death.

=== Safety context ===
Forest Service personnel have stated that the area above the established trail is particularly dangerous and that many rescues and serious injuries occur when hikers climb off trail toward Upper Catawba Falls, where there are no formal overlooks or rails. Reports indicated that staff attempted to discourage off‑trail hiking to the upper falls through signage, but hikers often ignored these warnings.

== See also ==
- List of waterfalls
- List of waterfalls in North Carolina
