= Crutchfield Crossroads, North Carolina =

- Unincorporated community
- Location of Crutchfield Crossroads in North Carolina Crutchfield Crossroads, North Carolina (the United States)
- Coordinates: 35°48′31″N 79°25′57″W
- Country: United States
- State: North Carolina
- County: Chatham
- Elevation: 627 ft (191 m)
- Time zone: UTC-5 (Eastern (EST))
  - Summer (DST): UTC-4 (EST)
- GNIS feature ID: 985012

Crutchfield Crossroads is an unincorporated community in northwestern Chatham County, North Carolina, United States, north of Siler City. The Whitehead-Fogleman Farm there was listed on the National Register of Historic Places in 1985.
