= National Register of Historic Places listings in Chatham County, North Carolina =

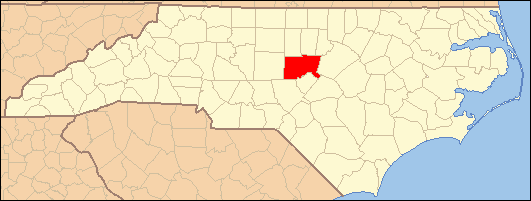

This list includes properties and districts listed on the National Register of Historic Places in Chatham County, North Carolina. Click the "Map of all coordinates" link to the right to view an online map of all properties and districts with latitude and longitude coordinates in the table below.

== Current listings ==
This National Park Service list is complete through NPS recent listings posted May 1, 2026.

	Name on the Register	Image	Date listed	Location	City or town	Description
1	Alston-DeGraffenried House		November 18, 1974 (#74001339)	West of Pittsboro off U.S. Route 64; also the northern side of U.S. Route 64, 0.4 miles (0.64 km) west of its junction with NC 1564; 35°43′51″N 79°14′38″W	Pittsboro	Second set of boundaries represents a boundary increase of October 21, 1993, the Alston-DeGraffenried Plantation
2	Aspen Hall		July 29, 1982 (#82003441)	West of Pittsboro on U.S. Route 64; 35°44′02″N 79°16′24″W	Pittsboro	
3	Baldwin's Mill	Baldwin's Mill	January 2, 1986 (#86000007)	SR 1520; 35°49′35″N 79°14′04″W	Pittsboro	
4	Bowen-Jordan Farm		July 5, 1985 (#85001451)	SR 1100; 35°40′51″N 79°30′30″W	Siler City	
5	Cadmus N. Bray House		December 30, 1999 (#99001620)	229 W. Second St. 35°43′25″N 79°27′42″W	Siler City	
6	Bray-Paschal House		December 27, 2011 (#11000973)	2488 Wade Paschal Rd. 35°40′59″N 79°29′15″W	Siler City	
7	Sheriff Stephen Wiley Brewer Farmstead	Sheriff Stephen Wiley Brewer Farmstead	August 21, 2003 (#03000801)	365 Thompson St. 35°43′26″N 79°10′13″W	Pittsboro	
8	Bynum Bridge	Bynum Bridge	April 23, 2020 (#100005196)	Old Bynum Road, connecting SR 1871 and SR 1713 over Haw River; 35°46′18″N 79°08′42″W	Bynum	
9	Bynum Historic District		April 15, 2025 (#100011658)	Bynum Church Road, Bynum Hill, Bynum Road, Charlie Fields Road, Durham Eubanks Road, Roy Hatley Road, Wheeler Road, Williams Pond Road; 35°46′26″N 79°08′31″W	Pittsboro vicinity	
10	Chatham County Courthouse	Chatham County Courthouse	May 10, 1979 (#79001691)	NC 15-501 and U.S. Route 64; 35°43′12″N 79°10′39″W	Pittsboro	
11	Luther Clegg House	Luther Clegg House	October 5, 1982 (#82001283)	South of Pittsboro on Moncure Pittsboro Rd. 35°41′55″N 79°09′48″W	Pittsboro	
12	Deep River Camelback Truss Bridge	Deep River Camelback Truss Bridge	June 9, 1995 (#95000696)	Adjacent to NC 2153 over the Deep River; 35°34′13″N 79°14′28″W	Cumnock and Gulf	
13	DeGraffenreidt-Johnson House		July 5, 1985 (#85001452)	SR 1346; 35°46′37″N 79°18′15″W	Silk Hope	
14	East Raleigh Street Historic District		May 11, 2000 (#00000488)	300-400 blocks of E. Second St., and 300-600 blocks of E. Raleigh St. 35°43′30″N 79°27′32″W	Siler City	
15	Ebenezer Methodist Church	Ebenezer Methodist Church	July 5, 1985 (#85001450)	SR 1008; 35°43′37″N 79°00′23″W	Bells	
16	Former High Point Bending and Chair Company		November 12, 1999 (#99001332)	108 W. 3rd St. 35°43′33″N 79°28′01″W	Siler City	
17	Lewis Freeman House	Lewis Freeman House	October 5, 1982 (#82001284)	205 W. Salisbury St. 35°43′18″N 79°10′48″W	Pittsboro	
18	Goldston Commercial Historic District		November 25, 1987 (#87002014)	Roughly S. Bellevue and S. Main Sts. between W. Goldbar and Colonial Sts. 35°35′33″N 79°19′41″W	Goldston	
19	Goodwin Farm Complex		July 5, 1985 (#85001453)	SR 1900; 35°43′11″N 78°57′37″W	Bells	
20	Gregson-Hadley House		July 5, 1985 (#85001454)	322 E. Raleigh St. 35°43′27″N 79°27′34″W	Siler City	
21	Hadley House and Grist Mill		November 25, 1980 (#80002807)	Northwest of Pittsboro on SR 2165; 35°42′32″N 79°18′02″W	Pittsboro	
22	Hall-London House	Hall-London House	October 5, 1982 (#82001285)	206 Hillsboro St. 35°43′19″N 79°10′37″W	Pittsboro	
23	Haughton-McIver House	Haughton-McIver House	July 5, 1985 (#85001455)	SR 1007; 35°33′26″N 79°17′05″W	Gulf	
24	Hotel Hadley		July 5, 1985 (#85001456)	103 N. Chatham St. 35°43′24″N 79°27′49″W	Siler City	
25	Johnson's Drive-In		February 5, 2025 (#100011159)	1520 East Eleventh Street; 35°43′59″N 79°26′31″W	Siler City	
26	Marion Jasper Jordan Farm		February 25, 1988 (#88000169)	R. Jordan Rd./SR 2145; 35°33′27″N 79°16′13″W	Gulf	
27	Kelvin		October 5, 1982 (#82001286)	503 W. Salisbury St. 35°43′16″N 79°11′02″W	Pittsboro	Destroyed
28	Lockville Dam, Canal and Powerhouse	Lockville Dam, Canal and Powerhouse	November 20, 1984 (#84000305)	West of Moncure at Deep River and U.S. Route 1; 35°37′10″N 79°05′45″W	Moncure	
29	London Cottage	London Cottage	October 5, 1982 (#82001287)	North of Pittsboro on Old Graham Rd. 35°43′38″N 79°11′12″W	Pittsboro	
30	Henry Adolphus London House	Henry Adolphus London House	September 3, 1998 (#98001143)	440 W. Salisbury St. 35°43′21″N 79°11′07″W	Pittsboro	
31	John A. Mason House		October 23, 1974 (#74001338)	Southwest of Durham off NC 751; 35°49′31″N 78°59′38″W	Farrington	
32	McClenahan House	McClenahan House	October 5, 1982 (#82001288)	Address Restricted	Pittsboro	The house has been moved within Pittsboro
33	Robert Joseph Moore House	Robert Joseph Moore House	September 3, 1998 (#98001142)	Bynum Rd. at its junction with Bynum Ridge Rd. 35°46′43″N 79°07′59″W	Bynum	
34	Moore-Manning House		October 5, 1982 (#82001289)	400 Hillsboro St. 35°43′32″N 79°10′35″W	Pittsboro	
35	Mount Vernon Springs Historic District		December 3, 1987 (#87002045)	SR 1134 and 1135; 35°39′32″N 79°26′38″W	Bonlee	
36	New Hope Rural Historical Archeological District		February 25, 1985 (#85000382)	Address Restricted	Wilsonville	
37	Newkirk Site (Site 31CH366)		November 14, 1983 (#83003813)	Address Restricted	Moncure	
38	North Third Avenue Historic District		July 20, 2000 (#00000824)	Roughly bounded by N. Second Ave., E. Fourth St., N. Third Ave., and E. Third St. 35°43′34″N 79°27′47″W	Siler City	
39	O'Kelly's Chapel	O'Kelly's Chapel	July 5, 1985 (#85001457)	NC 751; 35°51′56″N 78°56′41″W	Farrington	
40	Paschal-Womble House		April 26, 1984 (#84001957)	421 Main St. 35°35′40″N 79°19′44″W	Goldston	
41	Pittsboro Historic District	Pittsboro Historic District	May 5, 2000 (#00000442)	Roughly bounded by Chatham St., Small St., Rectory St., and Launis St. 35°43′21″N 79°10′36″W	Pittsboro	
42	Pittsboro Masonic Lodge	Pittsboro Masonic Lodge	January 31, 1978 (#78001938)	East and Masonic Sts. 35°43′13″N 79°10′32″W	Pittsboro	
43	Pittsboro Presbyterian Church	Pittsboro Presbyterian Church	January 30, 1978 (#78001939)	N. East St. 35°43′13″N 79°10′34″W	Pittsboro	
44	Reid House	Reid House	October 5, 1982 (#82001290)	200 W. Salisbury St. 35°43′19″N 79°10′45″W	Pittsboro	
45	William Alston Rives House		July 5, 1985 (#85001459)	End of SR 2183 off SR 2187; 35°37′24″N 79°18′22″W	Goldston	
46	Siler City City Hall		October 30, 1998 (#98001302)	311 N. Second Ave. 35°43′31″N 79°27′52″W	Siler City	
47	Siler City Commercial Historic District	Siler City Commercial Historic District	July 27, 2000 (#00000841)	Roughly bounded by Second Ave., Birch Ave., Third St. and Beaver St. 35°43′23″N 79°27′50″W	Siler City	
48	Siler City High School		July 15, 1998 (#98000873)	119 S. Third Ave. 35°43′23″N 79°27′36″W	Siler City	
49	Snipes-Fox House		September 3, 1998 (#98001144)	306 S. Dogwood Ave. 35°43′08″N 79°28′00″W	Siler City	
50	Patrick St. Lawrence House	Patrick St. Lawrence House	October 5, 1982 (#82001291)	Address Restricted	Pittsboro	Moved adjacent to the McClenahan House
51	Joseph B. Stone House	Joseph B. Stone House	June 1, 1982 (#82003440)	SR 1008; 35°46′47″N 79°00′25″W	Farrington	
52	William Teague House		July 5, 1985 (#85001458)	SR 1004; 35°46′24″N 79°26′41″W	Siler City	
53	A.P. Terry House	A.P. Terry House	October 5, 1982 (#82001292)	601 Womack St. 35°43′05″N 79°11′08″W	Pittsboro	
54	James A. Thomas Farm		July 5, 1985 (#85001460)	SR 1941; 35°42′21″N 79°04′43″W	Pittsboro	
55	Dr. E. H. Ward Farm	Dr. E. H. Ward Farm	July 5, 1985 (#85001461)	SR 1700; 35°46′44″N 79°05′47″W	Bynum	19th century homestead of a traveling physician, Dr. Edward Hiram Ward (August 1829 – June 1896) was the son of Hiram Ward (1794–1842) and Sara Hackney (1806–1848) and lived in Chatham County, North Carolina. Private residence, outdoor wedding and event location venue - Ward's Hollow.
56	Whitehead-Fogleman Farm		July 5, 1985 (#85001462)	Junction of SR 1351 and 1352; 35°50′01″N 79°27′20″W	Crutchfield Crossroads	
57	Burdett Woody House		August 6, 2008 (#08000773)	2232 White Smith Rd. 35°48′25″N 79°18′50″W	Siler City	

== Former listing ==
	Name on the Register	Image	Date listed	Date removed	Location	City or town	Description
1	Ebenezer Log Church		November 19, 1974 (#74001340)	March 18, 1980	Address Restricted; 35°48′25″N 79°18′50″W	Pittsboro	Collapsed in 1980.

== See also ==
- National Register of Historic Places listings in North Carolina
- List of National Historic Landmarks in North Carolina
