= Hadley House =

Hadley House may refer to:

in the United Kingdom

- Hadley House, Hadley Green, near Chipping Barnet

in the United States (by state)

- Story-Hadley House, Pine Mountain, Georgia, listed on the NRHP in Harris County, Georgia
- Mary Alica Hadley House, Louisville, Kentucky, listed on the NRHP in Jefferson County, Kentucky
- Gilbert Hadley Three-Decker, Worcester, Massachusetts, NRHP-listed
- Hadley-Ludwick House, Las Cruces, New Mexico, listed on the NRHP in Doña Ana County, New Mexico
- Hadley House and Grist Mill, Pittsboro, North Carolina, listed on the NRHP in Chatham County, North Carolina
- Gregson-Hadley House, Siler City, North Carolina, listed on the NRHP in Chatham County, North Carolina
- Hadley House (Stroud, Oklahoma), listed on the NRHP in Lincoln County, Oklahoma
- Walter Hadley House, Stroud, Oklahoma, listed on the NRHP in Lincoln County, Oklahoma
- Hadley-Locke House, Corvallis, Oregon, listed on the NRHP in Benton County, Oregon
- Brattain–Hadley House, Springfield, Oregon, listed on the NRHP in Lane County, Oregon
- Denny P. Hadley House, Brentwood, Tennessee, listed on the NRHP in Williamson County, Tennessee
