= Charles Whitley =

American politician (1927–2002)

Charles Orville Whitley
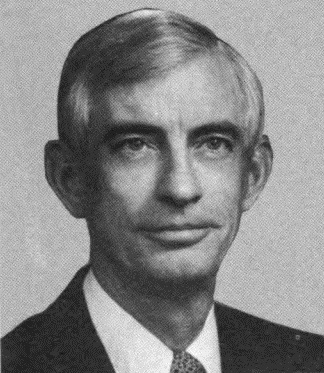

Member of the U.S. House of Representatives from North Carolina's 3rd district
- In office January 3, 1977 – December 31, 1986
- Preceded by: David N. Henderson
- Succeeded by: Martin Lancaster

Personal details
- Born: January 3, 1927 Siler City, North Carolina, U.S.
- Died: October 27, 2002 (aged 75) Durham, North Carolina, U.S.
- Party: Democratic

Charles Orville Whitley (January 3, 1927 – October 27, 2002) was a Democratic U.S. Congressman from North Carolina between 1977 and 1986.

Born in Siler City, North Carolina, Whitley attended Siler City High School, graduating in 1943. He served in the United States Army from 1944 to 1946, then attended Wake Forest University, earning his undergraduate degree in 1949 and a law degree in 1950. He earned an M.A. from the George Washington University in 1974.

Whitley became a lawyer and practiced in Mount Olive, North Carolina. There he taught business law classes at Mount Olive Junior College. He became the town's attorney in 1961; that same year, he joined the staff of Congressman David N. Henderson. In 1976 Whitley ran for Congress himself and was elected as a Democrat to the 95th United States Congress.

Re-elected four times (serving in Congress from January 3, 1977 to December 31, 1986). His Republican opponent in the 1982 midterm election was Eugene McDaniel, a former Naval Aviator and Vietnam War POW, whom he defeated 63–36%. He did not seek re-election in 1986, but retired to political consulting. Whitley died in Durham, North Carolina in 2002.

Whitley was the grandfather of civil rights activist, Annie E. Clark.

U.S. House of Representatives
Preceded by David N. Henderson	Member of the U.S. House of Representatives from North Carolina's 3rd congressional district 1977–1986	Succeeded by Martin Lancaster
