= William Bynum =

William Bynum may refer to:

- Bill Bynum (fl. 1980s–2020s), American businessperson and philanthropist
- W. F. Bynum (born 1943), British historian
- Will Bynum (born 1983), American basketball player
- William D. Bynum (1846–1927), American politician from Indiana
- William P. Bynum (1820–1909), justice of the North Carolina Supreme Court

== See also ==
- Billie Gene Bynum (born 1949), American former gridiron football quarterback
