= New Hope Rural Historical Archeological District =

Historic district in North Carolina, United States

- U.S. National Register of Historic Places
- U.S. Historic district
- Nearest city: Wilsonville, North Carolina
- Area: 1,145 acres (463 ha)
- NRHP reference No.: 85000382
- Added to NRHP: February 25, 1985

The New Hope Rural Historic Archeological District encompasses a collection of historic archaeological sites in Chatham County, North Carolina. The area, now partially inundated by Jordan Lake, was identified as archaeologically sensitive by the United States Army Corps of Engineers during the planning for the lake. The sites include the remains of farmsteads, and at least one slave cemetery.

The district was listed on the National Register of Historic Places in 1985.

== See also ==
- National Register of Historic Places listings in Chatham County, North Carolina
