= Bonlee, North Carolina =

Unincorporated community in North Carolina, US

Coordinates: 35°38′46″N 79°24′52″W

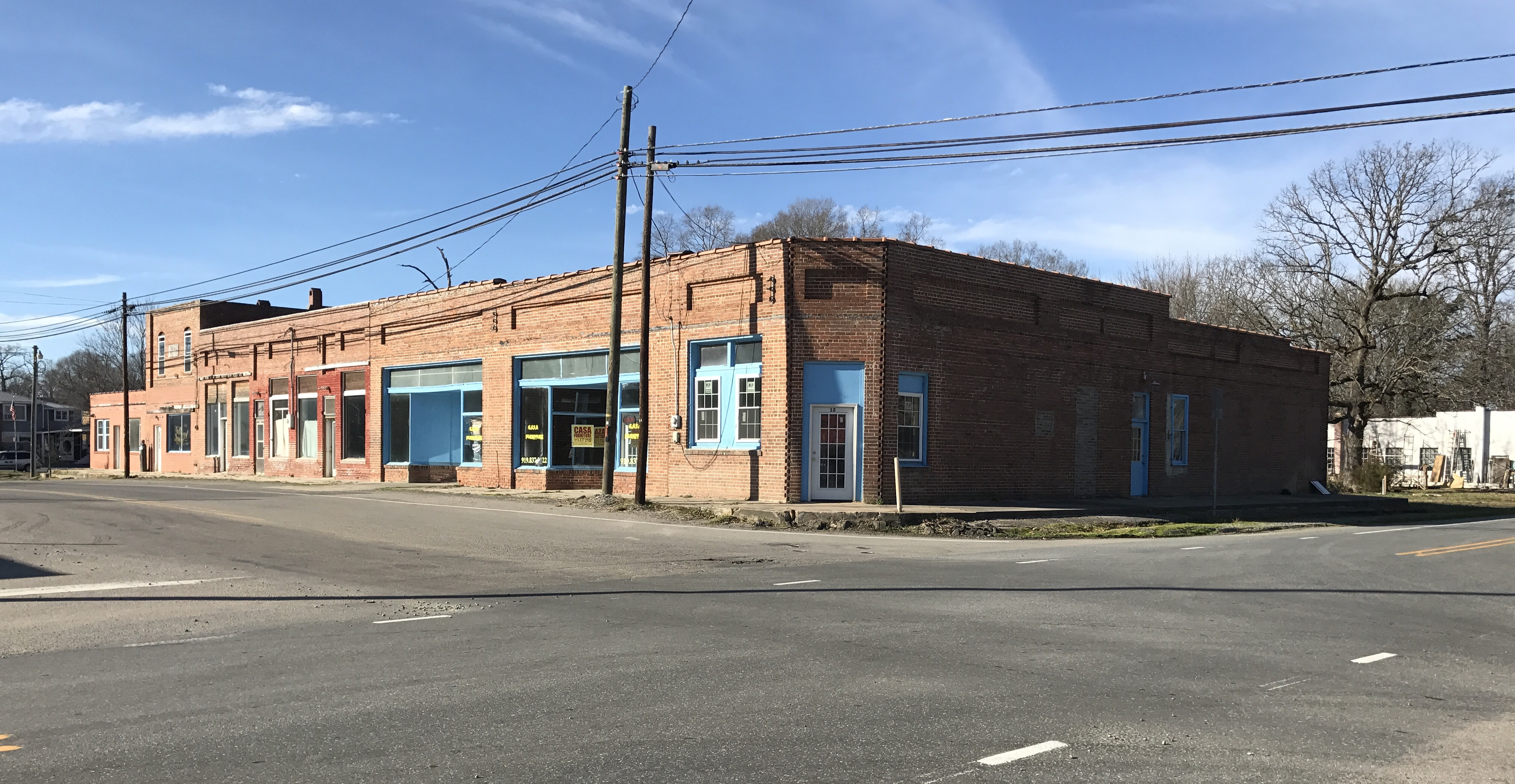
Bonlee, North Carolina

Bonlee is an unincorporated community in western Chatham County, North Carolina, United States. It is located south of Siler City and north of Bear Creek along Old U.S. Route 421. Bonlee sits at an elevation of 518 feet (158 m). The community is home to several poultry feed mills and a K-8 school. The ZIP Code for Bonlee is 27213.

Bonlee was established in 1894 as Dunlap Mills. Four years later it was renamed Causey, after local resident Joshua Causey. It took the name Bonlee in 1913. The town was incorporated in 1913, but had its incorporation revoked in 1936. The Mount Vernon Springs Historic District was listed on the National Register of Historic Places in 1987.
