= WNCA =

- Siler City, North Carolina; United States
- Broadcast area: Chatham County, North Carolina
- Frequency: 1570 kHz
- Branding: WNCA AM 1570, Your Information Station

Programming
- Format: Full-service radio

Ownership
- Owner: Chatham Broadcasting Co., Inc. of Siler City

History
- First air date: August 19, 1952; 73 years ago

Technical information
- Licensing authority: FCC
- Facility ID: 10664
- Class: B
- Power: 5,000 watts day; 280 watts night
- Transmitter coordinates: 35°43′59.5″N 79°29′31.08″W

Links
- Public license information: Public file; LMS
- Website: www.silercityevents.com

WNCA (1570 AM) is a radio station broadcasting a news/talk format. Licensed to Siler City, North Carolina, United States, the station is owned by Chatham Broadcasting. WNCA offers swap-shop, local news, local sports, obituaries, adult contemporary music, and beach music for the Siler City area.
