= Bells, North Carolina =

Community in Chatham County, North Carolina

Coordinates: 35°45′06″N 79°00′30″W

Bells is an unincorporated community in Chatham County, North Carolina, United States, located south of Farrington. It lies at an elevation of 226 feet (69 m).

Two sites in the town of Bells are listed on the National Register of Historic Places: Goodwin Farm Complex, and Ebenezer Methodist Church.
