= Chatham Central High School =

American public school in North Carolina

Location
- 14950 NC Highway 902 West; Bear Creek, North Carolina 27207; United States; 35°36′50″N 79°23′24″W

Information
- Type: Public
- Established: 1959 (67 years ago)
- School district: Chatham County Schools
- CEEB code: 340258
- Principal: Karla Eanes
- Teaching staff: 31.16 (on FTE basis)
- Grades: 9–12
- Enrollment: 326 (2023-2024)
- Student to teacher ratio: 10.46
- Colors: Red and white
- Athletics: NCHSAA 1A
- Athletics conference: Greater Triad 1A/2A
- Mascot: Bear
- Team name: Bears
- Website: www.chatham.k12.nc.us/o/cchs

Chatham Central High School is a public high school located in Bear Creek, North Carolina with a student population of around 400 students. It is part of Chatham County Schools.

== Notable alumni ==
- Rick Jones, former college baseball head coach
