= Bear Creek, Chatham County, North Carolina =

Unincorporated community in North Carolina, US

Coordinates: 35.617°N 79.385°W

Bear Creek is an unincorporated community in southwestern Chatham County, North Carolina, United States. It is named for a nearby creek that eventually flows into the Rocky River. The community lies along Old US Highway 421 and is situated between Siler City and Goldston. The ZIP Code for Bear Creek is 27207.

Bear Creek is home to Chatham Central High School, one of four high schools in the county. It is also home to Southern Supreme, a mail-order gourmet foods company best known for manufacturing fruitcakes. Bear Creek is also known for its vast farmland, including many commercial chicken farms.

== History ==
Bear Creek was originally named Richmond after Richard Jones who opened a business in Bear Creek in 1885. Early History of Chatham

The Baptists were first to organize congregations and erect church buildings in the county. From the Sandy Creek Association, which is the oldest in this state and one of the oldest in America, originated the different churches of the Baptist faith in the county. This Association was organized in the year 1758 and takes its name from the Sandy Creek meeting house, in what became Randolph County, where the organization was perfected. For quite a number of years all the separate Baptist Churches in Virginia, North Carolina, and South Carolina were included in this association. Among the early churches of the Baptist denomination organized in Chatham and affiliated with this Association, are Bear Creek, of which an eminent historian says:

“his church is located on Bear Creek in Chatham County, N.C. From 1785 to 1787 they held meetings as an arm of some other church, and met for worship at Powell's Meeting House, Bear Creek, Lick Creek and occasionally at private houses. They were constituted into a church in 1787. Elder Sherwood White was their first pastor. He was succeeded in 1790 by James Younges.
