= Bynum, North Carolina =

- Unincorporated community
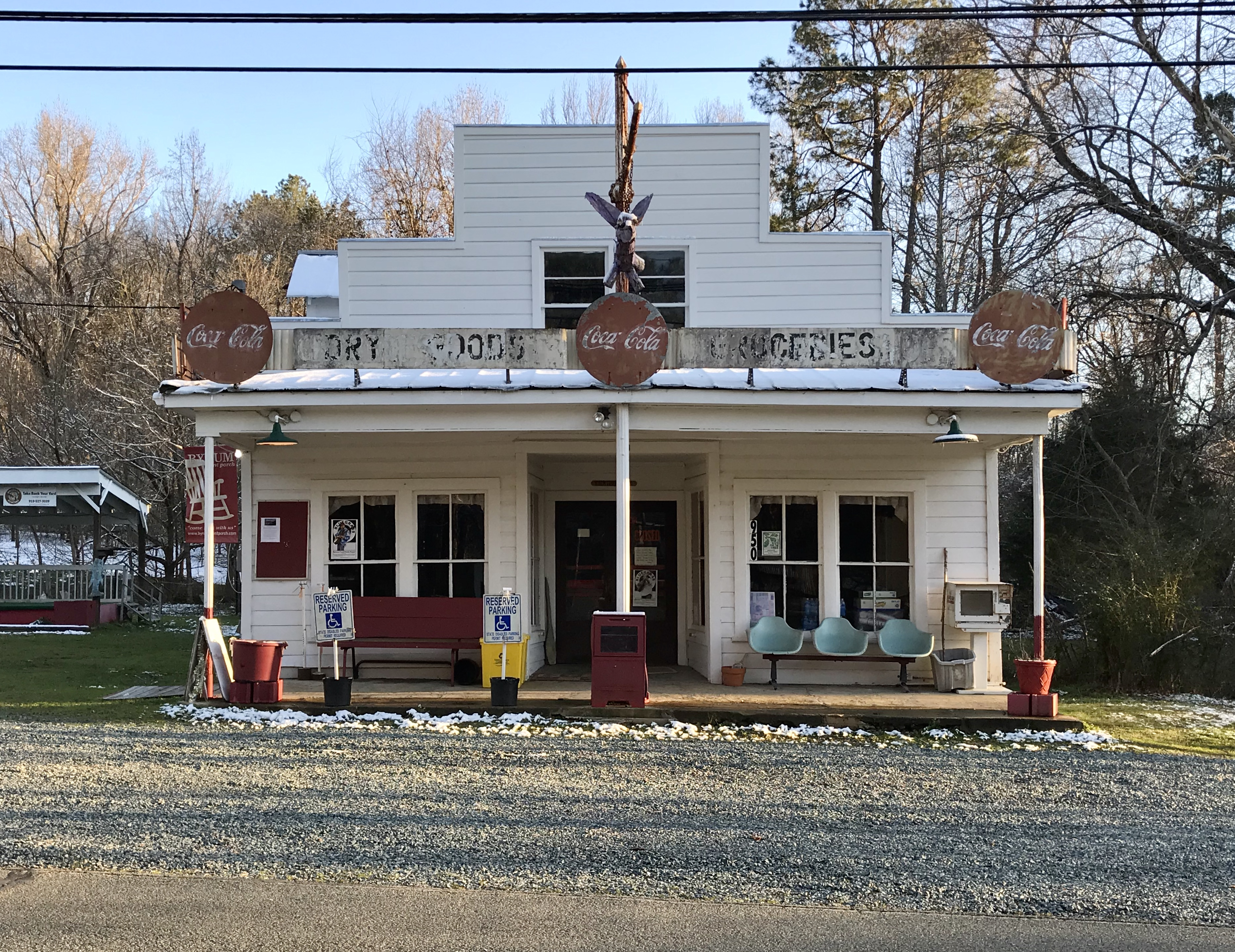
- Bynum General Store
- Interactive map of Bynum, North Carolina
- Coordinates: 35°46′27″N 79°08′32″W
- Country: United States
- State: North Carolina
- County: Chatham
- Elevation: 341 ft (104 m)
- Time zone: UTC-5 (Eastern (EST))
  - Summer (DST): UTC-4 (EST)

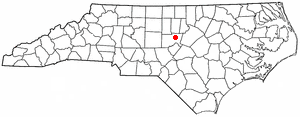
Location of Bynum, North Carolina

Bynum is an unincorporated community in northeastern Chatham County, North Carolina, United States on the banks of the Haw River. Bynum is five miles (8.0 km) north of Pittsboro and eleven miles (18 km) south of Chapel Hill. It is also known as Bynum Mill Village or Bynum Mill Hill.

Bynum's most notable building is the Bynum General Store at 950 Bynum Road, Bynum, NC 27228. For many years the store, run by Frank and Louise Harris, was known as Harris and Farrell General Store. The post office, once located at an older store to the south, brought everyone in town and many nearby rural residents to the store. Retired loggers, business people, and mill workers often sat on the bench in front of the store passing on news and rumors and telling stories. The store was a natural community center and information hub. When the store and post office closed in 2006, the community formed a non-profit called Bynum Front Porch and kept the store in use as an event and community center. The Bynum Front Porch Music Series runs every Friday evening, May–September at the Bynum General Store. Tift Merritt started her music career playing on the General Store's front porch.

== History ==
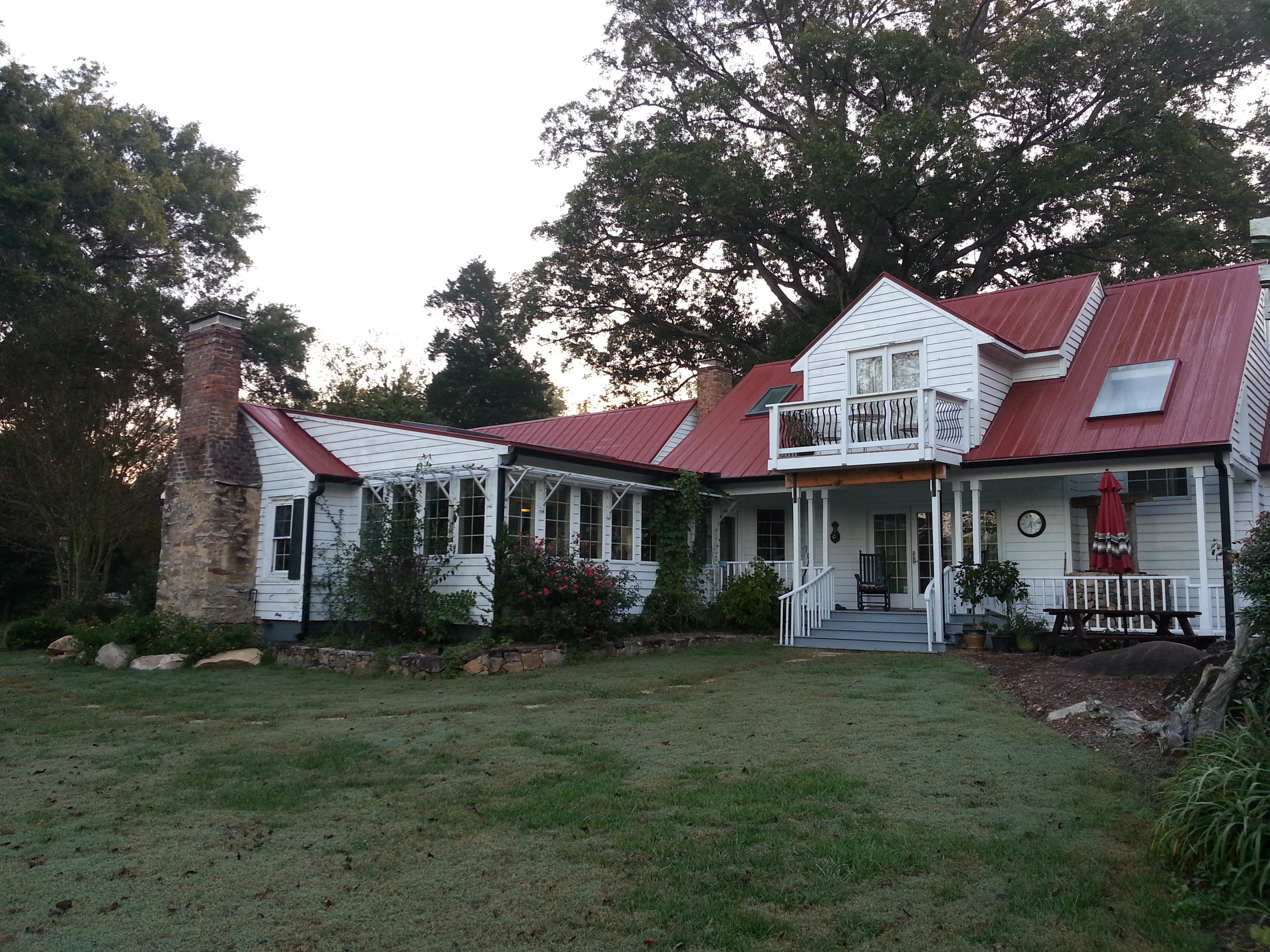
The Dr. E. H. Ward Farm in Bynum is listed on the National Register of Historic Places

The town began life as a "cotton mill town." The original mill was built about 1872 beside the Haw River. There was a wooden dam about 1000 feet upstream and water from the mill race powered water wheels. Later the dam was rebuilt with concrete and electrical generators installed. The spinning mill was purchased by John Milton Odell of Concord, North Carolina in 1886.

In stages from circa 1890 to 1910, small two to six room houses were built on the hill above the mill and rented to the mill workers and their families. Bynum was one of the first areas in Chatham County to have electric lights because turbines provided electricity for both the mill operation and the houses. The mill workers were paid in scrip. The scrip was only usable to pay their rent or at the "company store" (also owned by the mill).

In the 1970s the county commissioners, using federal grant money, bought the 73 mill worker houses from J.M.Odell Manufacturing Company with a Housing and Urban Development grant. With the money the streets were paved, cement blocks enclosed brick piers under houses, electrical boxes were updated and each house was supplied with indoor plumbing for a kitchen and bathroom. The existing tenants, who had been paying less than $10 a month rent to the mill, were given the chance to buy their homes with favorable long-term mortgages. Many mill workers had lived all their lives in these homes. Most bought their homes. Other homes found eager buyers. Many of the mill workers, suddenly in possession of rapidly appreciating assets, sold to newcomers and bought more modern homes elsewhere. Many of the new owners were college educated younger people, musicians, craftspeople, and artists.

Odell Manufacturing closed the Bynum mill in December, 1983. It was sold to a businessman from the neighboring county who used part of it to make lamp shades, but soon went out of business. The mill buildings sat vacant and decaying for many years, then burned down in March, 2001. Most of the original mill houses are still standing and are now private homes.

The former mill site is now part of the Lower Haw River State Natural Area. There is a canoe put-in, trail head and parking lot on Bynum Church Road. A two-mile (3.2 km) trail follows the Haw River southeast to Pokeberry Creek. Interpretive displays about the mill and the mill village are under development. The turbine building is still standing and the mill race empties into the Haw River nearby. The area adjoins and is managed by the Jordan Lake State Recreation Area.

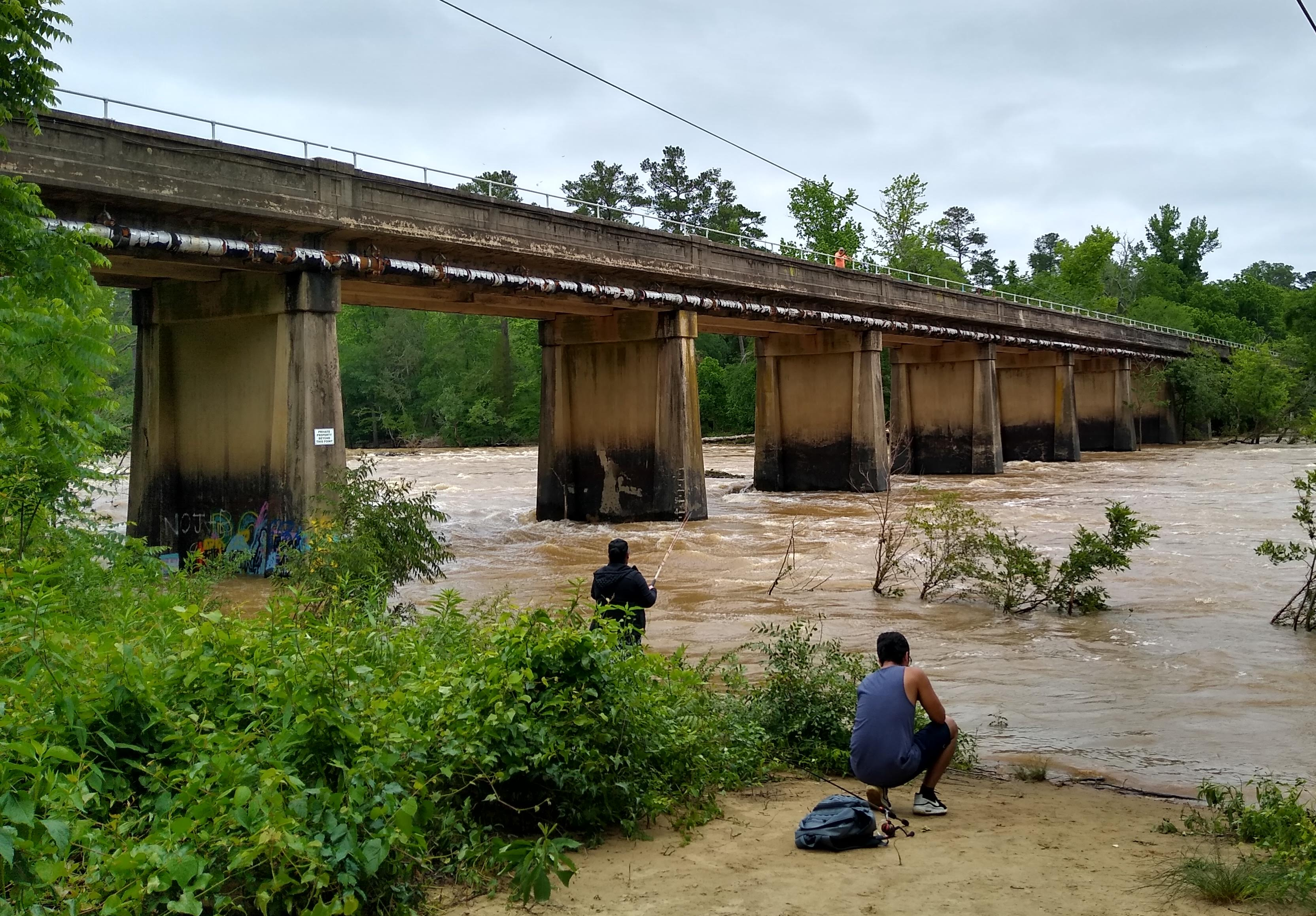
Bynum Bridge

The bridge crossing the Haw River at Bynum was originally a covered wooden bridge. It connected the major north–south highway in piedmont area of North Carolina—with Chapel Hill to the north and Pittsboro and Sanford to the south. The old Bynum Bridge replaced it in 1922 - concrete and approximately an 800-foot span. It was closed to motor vehicle traffic in 1999, but it is currently a pedestrian bridge and part of the statewide designated bicycle route as well as being a gathering place for the community on Halloween where many local folks artfully carve Jack-o'-lanterns and display them along the sides of the bridge. Cars now cross the Haw River on the newer US 15-501 bridges about 1000 feet north. There is another canoe take-out, dam and the mill race sluice gates at US 15-501.

== Arts and culture ==
Hundreds of Jack-o-lanterns line the old bridge rails on Halloween night from dark until midnight, and local artist and musicians perform. There are haunted houses and trick or treaters at the Bynum Methodist Church and Ruritan Club near the old bridge.

The Bynum Community Garden is on Bynum Hill Road. Chatham County's Earl Thompson Park is also on Bynum Hill Road and has playground and a baseball field.

The Robert Joseph Moore House and Dr. E. H. Ward Farm are listed on the National Register of Historic Places.

== Notable people ==
Banker and philanthropist Bill Bynum was raised in Bynum.
