= Chatham Charter High School =

American charter school in North Carolina

Chatham Charter School

Location
- 2200 Hamp Stone Road; Siler City, North Carolina 27344; United States
- 35°44′34″N 79°28′51″W

Information
- Type: Charter
- Established: August 2013 (12 years ago)
- Locale: Urban
- CEEB code: 343616
- Headmaster: John A. Eldridge
- Grades: K–12
- Enrollment: 583 (2023-2024)
- Colors: Purple and white
- Mascot: Knights
- Website: chathamcharter.org

Chatham Charter High School is a charter school in Siler City, North Carolina serving student from kindergarten through high school. The school sits on 39 acres and a 43,000 square foot facility. The education for grades 9–12 is a middle college model; students take core classes as 9th and 10th graders, then take courses through Central Carolina Community College as 11th and 12th graders. This results in students earning transferable college credits while simultaneously earning their high school diplomas.

== History ==
Chatham Charter was founded in 1996, as one of the first schools to receive a charter from the state.

== Athletics ==
Chatham Charter is part of the 1A Central Tar Heel Conference in the North Carolina High School Athletic Association. School sports include men's and women's cross country, men's and women's soccer, men's and women's basketball, softball, baseball, men's and women's tennis, golf, and volleyball.
