= David N. Henderson =

American politician (1921–2004)

- Official portrait, 1972

Member of the U.S. House of Representatives from North Carolina's 3rd district
- In office January 3, 1961 – January 3, 1977
- Preceded by: Graham A. Barden
- Succeeded by: Charles Whitley

Personal details
- Born: April 16, 1921 Hubert, North Carolina, U.S.
- Died: January 13, 2004 (aged 82) Wilmington, North Carolina, U.S.
- Party: Democratic

David Newton Henderson (April 16, 1921 – January 13, 2004) was an American politician who served as a member of the United States House of Representatives from North Carolina from 1961 to 1977.

Born on a farm near Hubert, North Carolina, Henderson attended Wallace High School, Wallace, North Carolina, graduating in 1938. He earned an LL.B. degree from Davidson College in June 1942 and was commissioned a second lieutenant in the United States Army Air Forces. He served in India, China and Okinawa and achieved the rank of major upon his discharge in 1946. He graduated from University of North Carolina Law School in 1949.

He became a lawyer in private practice and served as assistant general counsel to the Committee on Education and Labor, United States House of Representatives from 1951 to 1952; as solicitor of Duplin County, North Carolina, General Court from 1954 to 1958; and as a Duplin County, North Carolina, judge from 1958 to 1960.

In the early 1980s he also ran a lawyer-lobbyist company Cook and Henderson with former Republican United States Senate member Marlow Cook from Kentucky. Their major client was the Tobacco Institute.

Henderson was elected as a Democrat to the Eighty-seventh and to the seven succeeding Congresses (January 3, 1961 – January 3, 1977). He served as chair of the Committee on Post Office and Civil Service (Ninety-fourth Congress). He was not a candidate for reelection to the Ninety-fifth Congress in 1976, a seat won by a staff from his office, Charles Whitley. Henderson died on January 13, 2004, in Wilmington, North Carolina, and was interred at Rockfish Cemetery, Wallace, North Carolina.

== Sources ==
- United States Congress. "David N. Henderson (id: H000479)". Biographical Directory of the United States Congress.

U.S. House of Representatives
Preceded by Graham A. Barden	Member of the U.S. House of Representatives from North Carolina's 3rd congressional district 1961–1977	Succeeded by Charles O. Whitley
