= Jordan-Matthews High School =

American public school in North Carolina

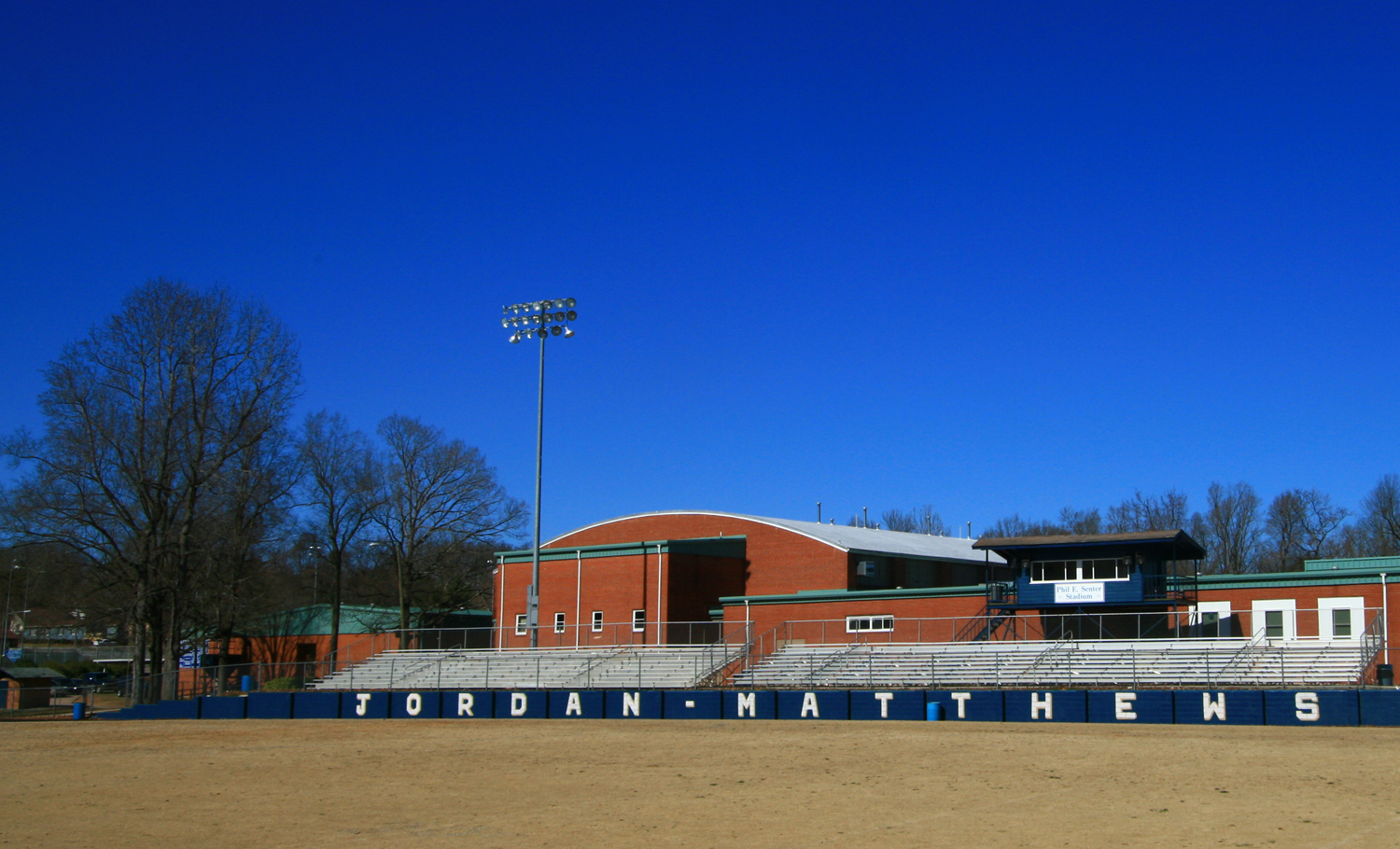
- Jordan-Matthews High School in Siler City, NC

Location
- 910 East Cardinal Street; Siler City, North Carolina 27344; United States; 35°43′25″N 79°27′04″W

Information
- Type: Public
- Motto: "It's A Great Day To Be A Jet"
- School district: Chatham County Public Schools
- CEEB code: 343615
- Principal: Adam Lutterloh
- Grades: 9–12
- Enrollment: 875 (2023-2024)
- Colors: Royal blue and gold
- Mascot: Jets
- Website: chatham.k12.nc.us/o/jm

Jordan-Matthews High School (also known as JM) is located in Siler City, North Carolina, United States. It opened in 1956 and is part of Chatham County Public Schools.

== History ==
Jordan-Matthews opened in 1956, serving as Siler City's all-white high school. In 1968, it integrated by merging with nearby Chatham High School, the all-black high school in Siler City. Following integration, controversy arose over resemblances between the KKK and the school's mascot at the time, the Blue Phantom. The school changed to its current mascot, the Jet, in 1971.

In 2009 US News and World Report assigned JM a Silver Medal as one of the best high schools in America.

In 2011, the Jordan-Matthews High School Arts Foundation was established as a nonprofit to further fine arts education at Jordan-Matthews.

== Student population ==
Chatham County experienced a large influx of Hispanics during the 1990s and 2000s. The number of Hispanic children enrolled in school increased by 598% from 1990 to 1998. In the 2010−11 school year, of the 732 students, 42% were Hispanic, 36% were White, 21% were Black, and less than 1% were American Indian or Asian.

== Athletics ==
Jordan-Matthews is a member of the North Carolina High School Athletic Association (NCHSAA) and are currently classified as a 4A school. The school is a part of the Four Rivers 3A/4A Conference.

In 2014, documentary series Los Jets premiered on NuvoTV, centering around the school's soccer team and its history.

== Notable alumni ==
- George Edwards, NFL coach
- Greg Harris, MLB pitcher
- Eddie Mason, NFL linebacker
