= Siler City Municipal Airport =

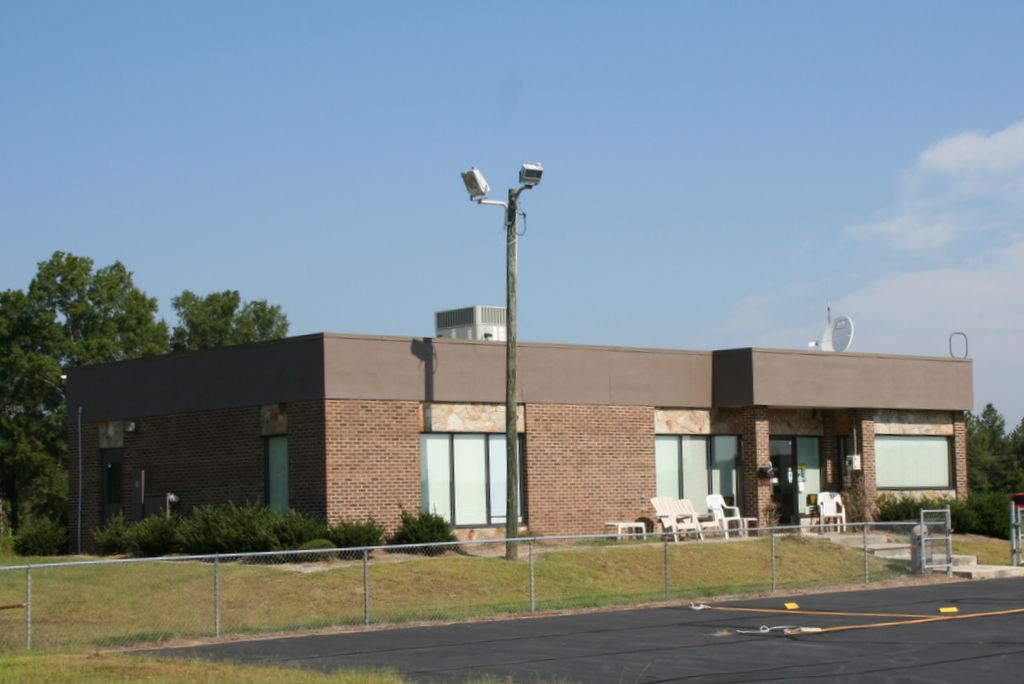
- Terminal building
- IATA: none; ICAO: KSCR; FAA LID: SCR

Summary
- Airport type: Public
- Owner: Town of Siler City
- Serves: Siler City, North Carolina
- Elevation AMSL: 615 ft (187 m)
- Coordinates: 35°42′15″N 079°30′15″W

Map
- Location of airport in North Carolina

Runways
Direction	Length		Surface
Direction	ft	m	Surface
4/22	5,000	1,524	Asphalt

Statistics (2009)
- Aircraft operations: 21,500
- Based aircraft: 24
- Source: Federal Aviation Administration

Siler City Municipal Airport (ICAO: KSCR, FAA LID: SCR) is a public use airport located three nautical miles (6 km) southwest of the central business district of Siler City, a town in Chatham County, North Carolina, United States. It is owned by the Town of Siler City. This airport is included in the National Plan of Integrated Airport Systems for 2011–2015, which categorized it as a general aviation facility.

== Facilities and aircraft ==
Siler City Municipal Airport covers an area of 92 acres (37 ha) at an elevation of 615 feet (187 m) above mean sea level. It has one runway designated 4/22 with an asphalt surface measuring 5,000 by 75 feet (1,524 x 23 m).

For the 12-month period ending August 6, 2009, the airport had 21,500 aircraft operations, an average of 58 per day: 95% general aviation and 5% military. At that time there were 24 aircraft based at this airport: 79% single-engine and 21% multi-engine.

== See also ==
- List of airports in North Carolina
