= Former High Point Bending and Chair Company =

Historic industrial complex in North Carolina, US

- U.S. National Register of Historic Places
- Location within North Carolina Location within the United States
- Location: 108 W. 3rd St., Siler City, North Carolina
- Coordinates: 35°43′33″N 79°28′1″W
- Area: 9 acres (3.6 ha)
- Built: 1908, c. 1920, c. 1948
- Architectural style: Industrial
- NRHP reference No.: 99001332
- Added to NRHP: November 12, 1999

The former High Point Bending and Chair Company, also known as Boling Chair Company and Boling Company, is a historic factory complex located at Siler City, Chatham County, North Carolina. The complex includes the original 1908 factory building, along with brick factory buildings built about 1920 and 1948. The original factory is a three-story, brick building with several additions. Also on the property is a contributing section of Cape Fear and Yadkin Railroad tracks (c. 1884). Any furniture left from the disaster can be worth thousands of dollars given rarity and condition.

It was listed on the National Register of Historic Places in 1999.
