= Bill Bynum (Canadian football) =

American football player (born 1949)

No. 5
- Position: Quarterback

Personal information
- Born: July 11, 1949 (age 77); Torrance, California, U.S.
- Listed height: 6 ft 2 in (1.88 m)
- Listed weight: 205 lb (93 kg)

Career information
- High school: Torrance
- College: Western New Mexico
- NFL draft: 1971: 14th round, 349th overall pick

Career history
- Washington Redskins (1971)*; Norfolk Neptunes (1971); Washington Redskins (1972)*; San Diego Chargers (1973)*; Hartford Knights (1973); St. Louis Cardinals (1974)*; BC Lions (1974); Toronto Argonauts (1975)
- * Offseason or practice squad member only

Billie Gene Bynum (born July 11, 1949) is an American former professional football quarterback who played for the Toronto Argonauts of the Canadian Football League (CFL). He played college football for the Western New Mexico Mustangs and was selected by the Washington Redskins in the 14th round of the 1971 NFL draft.

== Early life ==
Billie Gene Bynum was born on July 11, 1949, in Torrance, California. He was the starting quarterback at Torrance High School for two years before graduating in 1967. He was also a "star" pitcher in baseball, and teammates with future Major League Baseball players Fred Kendall and Bart Johnson.

== College career ==
Bynum enrolled at Western New Mexico University to play college football for the Western New Mexico Mustangs. He was a four-year starter at quarterback from 1967 to 1970. He first pass in college went for a 60-yard touchdown. Bynum was MVP of the football team his senior year in 1970, throwing for 1,337 yards while helping them win the Rocky Mountain Division Championship. He was a roll-out quarterback in college due to having a poor offensive line. He also played college baseball for the Mustangs, and was named the team MVP in 1970 after batting for a .400 average and 10 home runs. Bynum graduated from Western New Mexico in 1971. He was inducted into Western New Mexico's athletics hall of fame in 2001.

== Professional career ==
Bynum was selected by the Washington Redskins in the 14th round, with the 349th overall pick, of the 1971 NFL draft. He was the first player from Western New Mexico ever picked in the NFL draft. He reportedly had a strong arm. Bynum was released on September 13 before the start of the 1971 regular season.

Bynum was signed by the Norfolk Neptunes of the Atlantic Coast Football League (ACFL) on September 13, 1971. However, he did not attempt any passes for the Neptunes that year.

Bynum signed with the Redskins again in 1972. He threw a touchdown on August 18 against the Philadelphia Eagles. He was released on September 2, 1972, before the final preseason game.

Bynum signed with the San Diego Chargers in 1973 but was released. He played for the ACFL's Hartford Knights early in the 1973 season and threw two touchdown passes. On September 17, 1973, it was reported that he had left the team to return home to California.

Bynum was signed by the St. Louis Cardinals in 1974. Due to the 1974 NFL players strike, Bynum was the starting quarterback for the Cardinals during the 1974 Pro Football Hall of Fame Game. He was released after the final preseason game.

On September 20, 1974, it was reported that Bynum had signed a five-day trial with the BC Lions of the Canadian Football League (CFL). He did not play in any games for the Lions and was not re-signed once the trial ended.

Bynum signed with the Toronto Argonauts for the 1975 CFL season. After Mike Rae suffered an injury in the regular season opener, Bynum started the next four games at quarterback for the Argonauts. Rae then returned from injury. Bynum dressed in 13 games overall in 1975, completing 87 of 161 passes (54.0%) for 923 yards, two touchdowns, and six interceptions while also rushing 24 times for 143 yards. The Argonauts released Bynum on October 16, 1975, to make room for Chuck Ealey.

== Post-playing career ==
Bynum was a substitute teacher in Torrance during the football offseasons. He became the head football coach at Torrance High in 1991. He also worked at Hughes Aircraft.
