= Bowen-Jordan Farm =

Historic house in North Carolina, United States

- U.S. National Register of Historic Places
- Location within North Carolina Location within the United States
- Location: SR 1100, near Siler City, North Carolina
- Coordinates: 35°40′51″N 79°30′30″W
- Area: 89 acres (36 ha)
- Built: c. 1825
- Architectural style: Federal
- MPS: Chatham County MRA
- NRHP reference No.: 85001451
- Added to NRHP: July 5, 1985

Bowen-Jordan Farm is a historic home located near Siler City, Chatham County, North Carolina. It was built about 1825, and is a 2 1/2-story, Federal style frame dwelling. It has a steeply pitched gable roof and massive single stepped shoulder end chimneys. The house was expanded by mid- and late-19th century additions and enclosures. Also on the property are the contributing kitchen / slave cabin and smokehouse.

It was listed on the National Register of Historic Places in 1985.
