= Silk Hope, North Carolina =

Settlement in North Carolina, US

Coordinates: 35°46′52″N 79°22′12″W

Silk Hope, in Chatham County, North Carolina, United States, is a farm community centered on a school, a volunteer fire department, several country churches, and many historical farmsteads. Some residents who work in Cary, Chapel Hill, and Research Triangle Park have established "country" homes here. Its ZIP Code is 27344.

According to oral history, the name came from an early 19th-century enterprise to develop a silk industry here. Entrepreneurs imported silk worms and planted mulberry trees, but were not successful. No signs remain of the silk ambitions. Farmers in the area also cultivated cotton in the antebellum years, and used a local cotton gin that once stood at the Silk Hope crossroads. Due to soil limitations, they could not produce much of the commodity crop.

Community residents come together each Labor Day to celebrate their heritage at the "Silk Hope Old Fashioned Farmers Day". The Shakori Hills Grassroots Festival held nearby has attracted more than 4,500 people.

The DeGraffenreidt-Johnson House was listed on the National Register of Historic Places in 1985.
