= Goodwin Farm Complex =

Historic house in North Carolina, United States

- U.S. National Register of Historic Places
- Location within North Carolina Location within the United States
- Location: SR 1900, near Bells, North Carolina
- Coordinates: 35°43′11″N 78°57′37″W
- Area: 57 acres (23 ha)
- Built by: Goodwin, John & W.H.
- Architectural style: Triple-A
- MPS: Chatham County MRA
- NRHP reference No.: 85001453
- Added to NRHP: July 5, 1985

Goodwin Farm Complex is a historic home and farm located near Bells, Chatham County, North Carolina. The complex was established during the period 1850–1860. The main house consists of the original combined log cabin and detached kitchen in a one-story triple-A frame house, with a two-story section added about 1900. Also on the property are late-19th century agricultural outbuildings.

It was listed on the National Register of Historic Places in 1985.
