= Snipes–Fox House =

Historic house in North Carolina, United States

- U.S. National Register of Historic Places
- Location within North Carolina Location within the United States
- Location: 306 S. Dogwood Ave., Siler City, North Carolina
- Coordinates: 35°43′8″N 79°28′0″W
- Area: less than one acre
- Built: c. 1900
- Architectural style: Late Victorian
- NRHP reference No.: 98001144
- Added to NRHP: September 3, 1998

Snipes–Fox House is a historic home located at Siler City, Chatham County, North Carolina. It was built about 1900, and is a two-story, three bay Late Victorian style frame dwelling. It features an expansive wrap-around porch and unique interior woodwork. Also on the property is a contributing frame front-gabled smokehouse.

It was listed on the National Register of Historic Places in 1998.
