= William Teague House =

Historic house in North Carolina, United States

- U.S. National Register of Historic Places
- Location within North Carolina Location within the United States
- Location: SR 1004, near Siler City, North Carolina
- Coordinates: 35°46′24″N 79°26′41″W
- Area: 7 acres (2.8 ha)
- Built: c. 1820-1830, c. 1850
- Architectural style: Federal, Greek Revival
- MPS: Chatham County MRA
- NRHP reference No.: 85001458
- Added to NRHP: July 5, 1985

The William Teague House is a historic home located near Siler City, in Chatham County, North Carolina. It was built in several sections built at various times during the first half of the 19th century. The property consists of a two-story log cabin dating from the 1820s to the 1830s; a 1 1/2-story, one-room log section, and a rear shed and side frame additions. The house exhibits vernacular Federal and Greek Revival design elements. Also on the property are a contributing small corn crib and a smokehouse.

It was listed on the National Register of Historic Places in 1985.
