= Ebenezer Methodist Church (Bells, North Carolina) =

Historic church in North Carolina, United States

- U.S. National Register of Historic Places
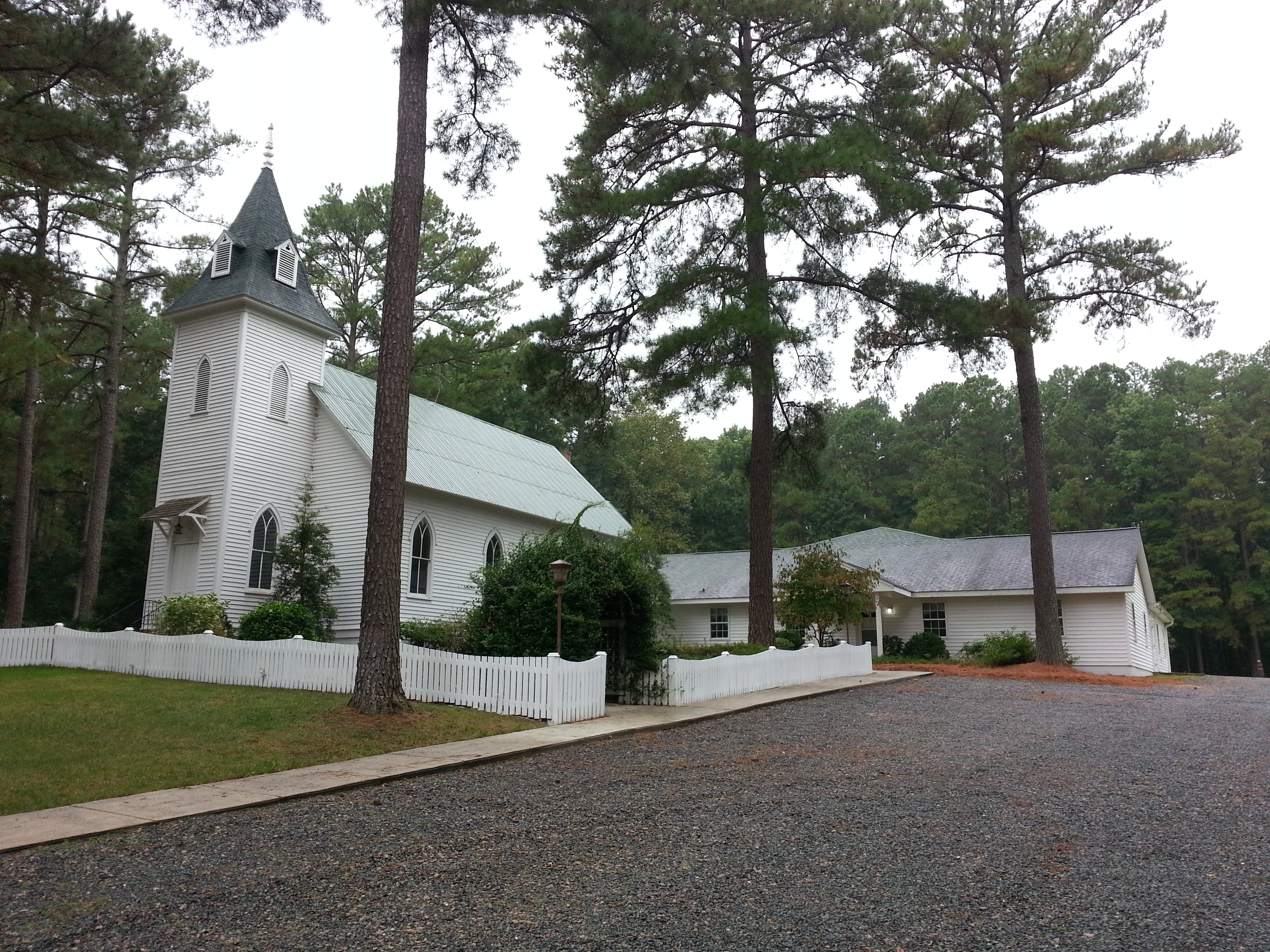

- Location within North Carolina Location within the United States
- Location: SR 1008, near Bells, North Carolina
- Coordinates: 35°43′37″N 79°0′23″W
- Area: 1 acre (0.40 ha)
- Built: 1890
- Architectural style: Gothic Revival
- MPS: Chatham County MRA
- NRHP reference No.: 85001450
- Added to NRHP: July 05, 1985

Ebenezer Methodist Church is a historic church located near Bells, Chatham County, North Carolina. It is located on the west side of SR 1008, about 0.5 miles (0.80 km) north of its junction with SR 1975. It is a modest single-story wood-frame structure, with a steeply pitched metal gable roof and weatherboard siding. It has Gothic Revival features, including a tower with Gothic-arched entrance openings. The sanctuary's windows, doors, and interior woodworking are original to the structure. It was built about 1890, for a Methodist congregation established in 1827.

The building listed on the National Register of Historic Places in 1985.
