= Robert Joseph Moore House =

Historic house in North Carolina, United States

- U.S. National Register of Historic Places
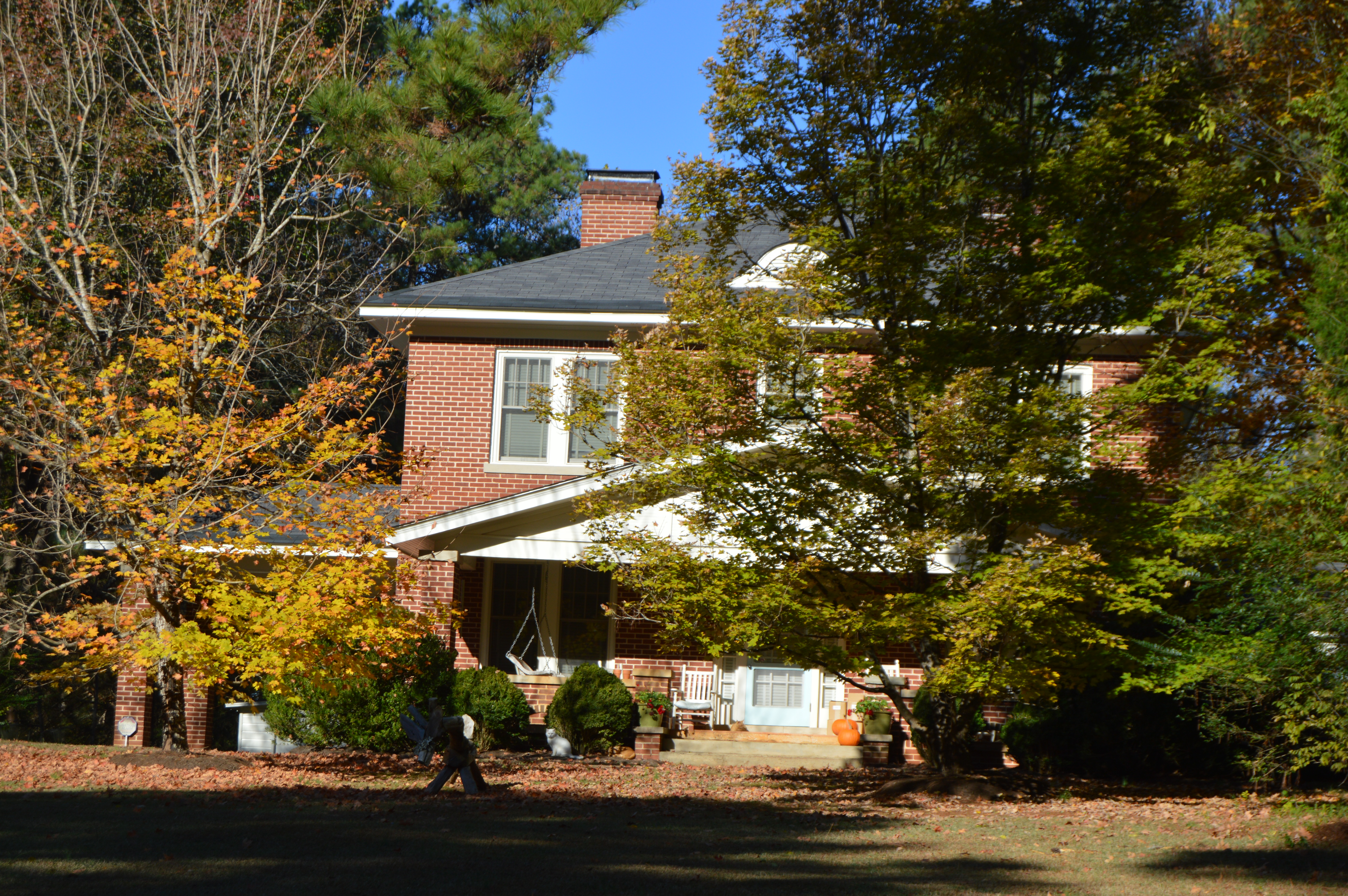
- Front

- Location within North Carolina Location within the United States
- Location: NC 1713, jct. with NC 1711, Bynum, North Carolina
- Coordinates: 35°46′43″N 79°8′0″W
- Area: 8.7 acres (3.5 ha)
- Built: 1929
- Built by: Romy Cheek
- Architectural style: Colonial Revival, Four-square house
- NRHP reference No.: 98001142
- Added to NRHP: September 3, 1998

Robert Joseph Moore House is a historic home located at Bynum, Chatham County, North Carolina. It was built in 1929, and is a two-story, four-square, brick dwelling with a brick foundation and a low pyramidal roof with Colonial Revival and American Craftsman design elements. Also on the property are the contributing garage (c. 1930) and barn (c. 1930).

It was listed on the National Register of Historic Places in 1998.
