= Goldston, North Carolina =

- Town
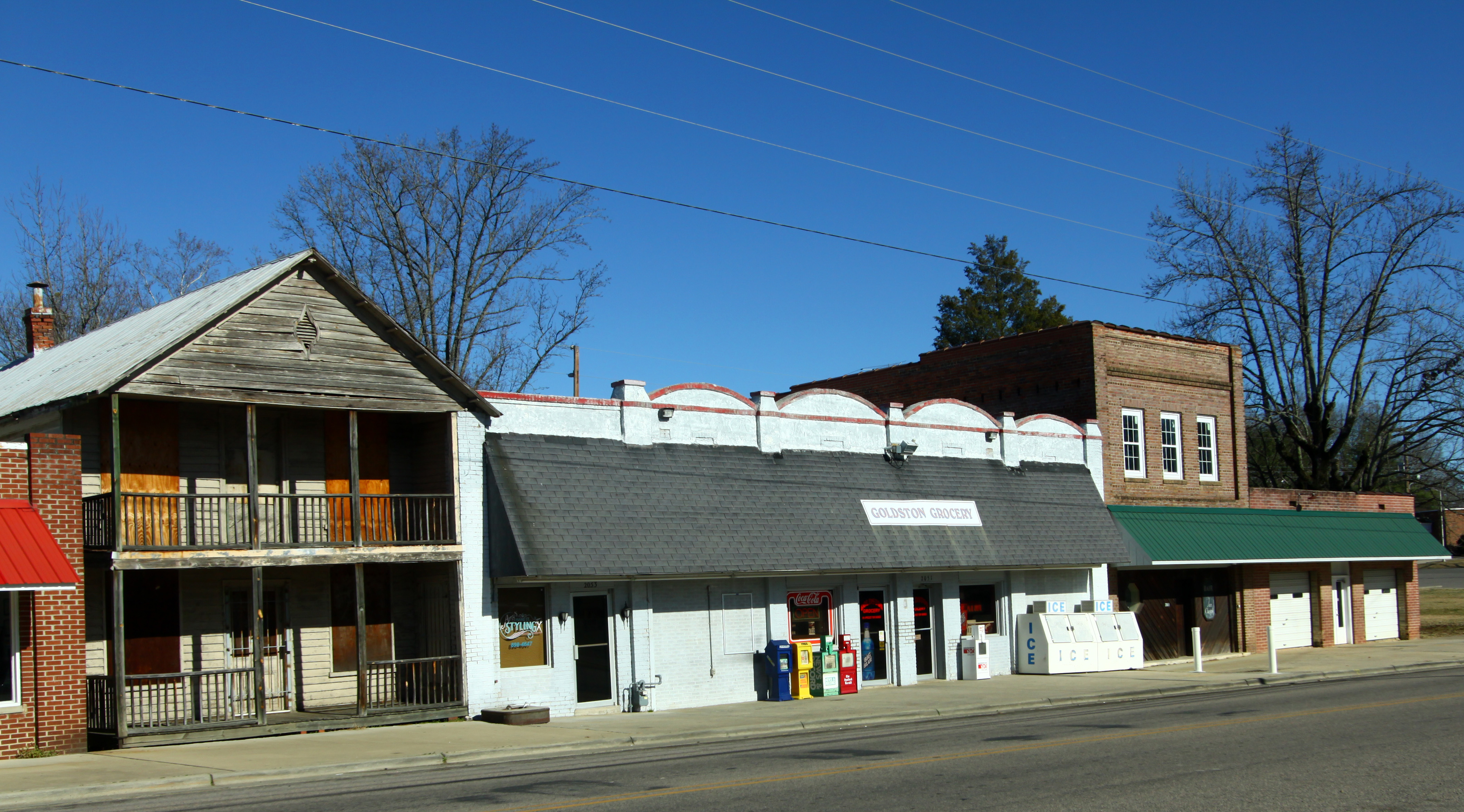
- Commercial buildings along North Main Street

- Seal

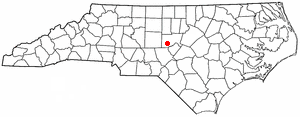
- Location of Goldston, North Carolina
- Coordinates: 35°35′32″N 79°19′39″W
- Country: United States
- State: North Carolina
- County: Chatham

Area
  - Total: 0.83 sq mi (2.16 km^{2})
  - Land: 0.83 sq mi (2.15 km^{2})
  - Water: 0.0039 sq mi (0.01 km^{2})
- Elevation: 417 ft (127 m)

Population (2020)
  - Total: 234
  - Density: 282.4/sq mi (109.03/km^{2})
- Time zone: UTC-5 (Eastern (EST))
  - Summer (DST): UTC-4 (EDT)
- ZIP code: 27252
- Area code: 919
- FIPS code: 37-26920
- GNIS feature ID: 2406585
- Website: townofgoldston.gov

Goldston is a town in Chatham County, North Carolina, United States, south of Pittsboro. As of the 2020 census, Goldston had a population of 234.

== Geography ==
Goldston is located in southern Chatham County. U.S. Route 421, a four-lane expressway, passes northeast of the town, with access from Exit 159. US 421 leads southeast 12 miles (19 km) to Sanford and northwest 44 miles (71 km) to Greensboro. Via rural roads it is 13 miles (21 km) northeast from Goldston to Pittsboro, the Chatham County seat.

Soils at Goldston are dominantly yellowish brown, moderately well drained to somewhat poorly drained silt loams of the Cid or Lignum soil series. Brown to yellowish red, well drained silt loam of the Nanford series is also common.

According to the United States Census Bureau, Goldston has a total area of 0.81 square miles (2.1 km^{2}), of which 0.004 square miles (0.01 km^{2}), or 0.64%, is water.

== Historic features ==
The Goldston Commercial Historic District is registered on the National Register of Historic Places. The town is also home to several historic homes: the Paschal-Womble House and William Alston Rives House. The town is named for its founders, the Goldston family.

== Business and industry ==
The town has always been predominantly rural, and most of the business and industry over the years has been centered around the area's agricultural heritage, mainly the poultry industry. The town's location near the railroad line has helped to keep industry going in the area, although in recent years the town has seen a decline in industry. The town has a Dollar General variety store as well as two restaurants, Lizzie's and Rufus's.

== Railroad ==
Goldston is located on a spur of the Norfolk Southern Railway that runs between Greensboro and Sanford. The railroad was historically important to the growth of the town. The rail line was once part of the now defunct Southern Railway, and prior to that the Atlantic & Yadkin Railway. Until a few years ago many older Southern-marked freight gondolas could be found parked on a side track downtown and at the nearby old Pomona Clay pit.

Most of the rail traffic that comes through town is local freight between Sanford and Greensboro or freight going to the Aberdeen, Carolina and Western Railway, which connects 4 miles (6 km) to the southeast of Goldston in the village of Gulf. Most of this freight is composed of grain hopper cars going to local poultry feed mills. Norfolk Southern Right of Way Maintenance equipment and cars are also frequently parked on the side trackage in Goldston.

== Demographics ==
Historical population
Census	Pop.	Note	%±
1910	240		—
1920	289		20.4%
1930	312		8.0%
1940	416		33.3%
1950	372		−10.6%
1960	374		0.5%
1970	364		−2.7%
1980	353		−3.0%
1990	299		−15.3%
2000	319		6.7%
2010	268		−16.0%
2020	234		−12.7%
U.S. Decennial Census

As of the census of 2010, there were 268 people, 144 households, and 121 occupied houses in the town. As of the census of 2000, the population density was 403.8 inhabitants per square mile (155.9/km^{2}). There were 142 housing units at an average density of 179.8 per square mile (69.4/km^{2}). The racial makeup of the town was 90.91% White, 6.58% African American, 0.31% Native American, 0.63% from other races, and 1.57% from two or more races. Hispanic or Latino of any race were 3.45% of the population.

There were 128 households, out of which 26.6% had children under the age of 18 living with them, 55.5% were married couples living together, 12.5% had a female householder with no husband present, and 27.3% were non-families. 23.4% of all households were made up of individuals, and 11.7% had someone living alone who was 65 years of age or older. The average household size was 2.49 and the average family size was 2.92.

As of the census of 2000, the median income for a household in the town was $35,000, and the median income for a family was $46,250. Males had a median income of $40,114 versus $22,188 for females. The per capita income for the town was $18,485. About 8.9% of families and 13.9% of the population were below the poverty line, including 25.4% of those under age 18 and 20.8% of those age 65 or over.

== Miscellaneous ==
- Although technically a town by incorporation standards, the town has no official town-employed police force. All law enforcement is handled by the Chatham County Sheriff's Office, which operates a substation in the town.
- Country singer Charlie Daniels lived near Goldston as a child, and graduated from the now demolished Goldston High School in 1955.
