= Burdett Woody House =

Historic house in North Carolina, United States

- U.S. National Register of Historic Places
- Location within North Carolina Location within the United States
- Location: 2232 White Smith Rd., near Siler City, North Carolina
- Coordinates: 35°48′25″N 79°18′50″W
- Area: 5 acres (2.0 ha)
- Built: c. 1901
- Architectural style: Triple A I house
- MPS: Chatham County MRA
- NRHP reference No.: 08000773
- Added to NRHP: August 6, 2008

Burdett Woody House is a historic home located near Siler City, Chatham County, North Carolina. It was built about 1901, and is a two-story, three-bay, triple-A frame I house dwelling. It sits on a brick pier foundation and has an original one-story rear ell. Also on the property is a contributing smokehouse.

It was listed on the National Register of Historic Places in 2008.
