= Dr. E. H. Ward Farm =

Historic house in North Carolina, United States

- U.S. National Register of Historic Places
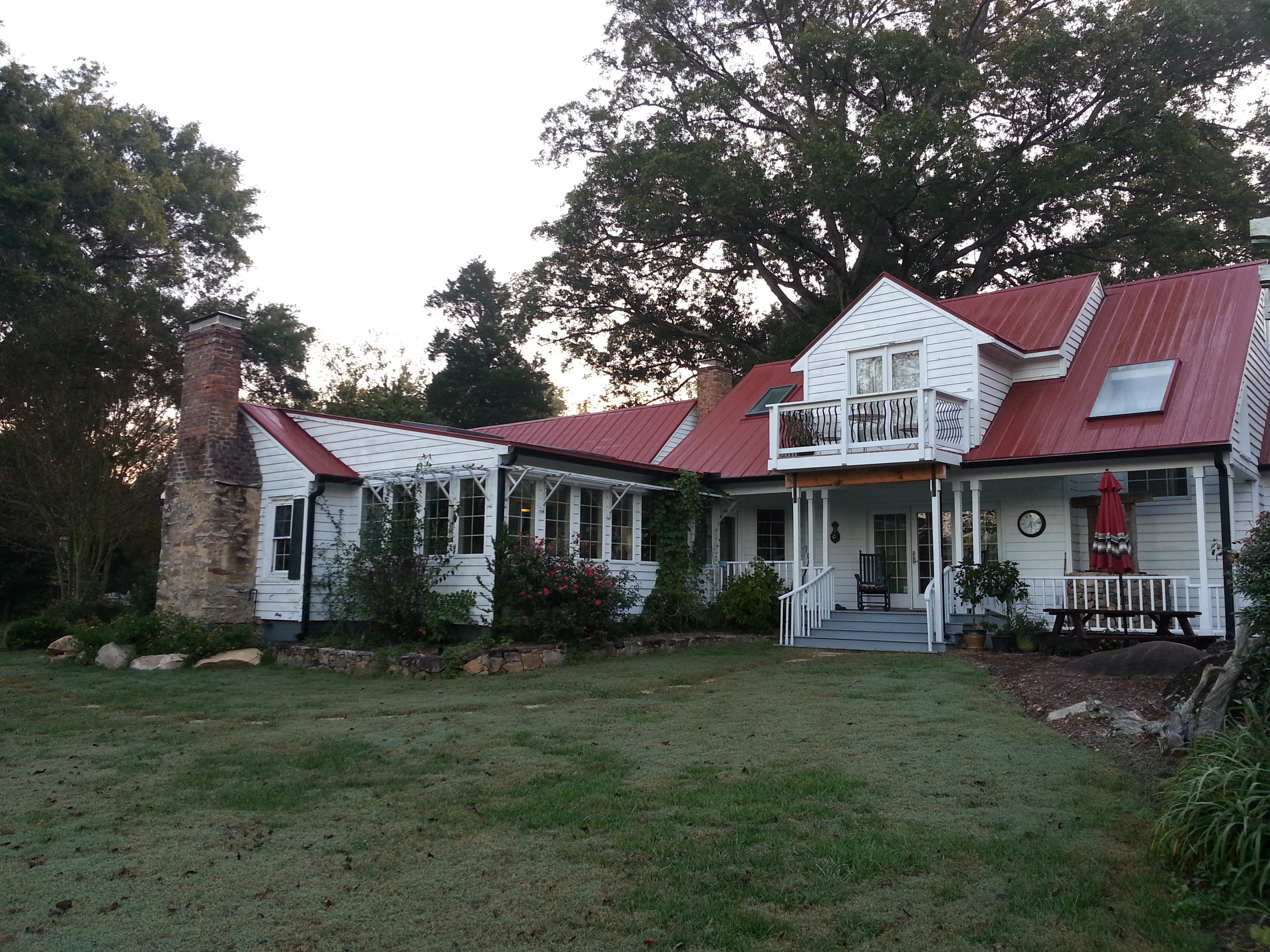
- Dr. E. H. Ward Farmhouse, September 2012

- Location within North Carolina Location within the United States
- Location: SR 1700, near Bynum, North Carolina
- Coordinates: 35°46′44″N 79°5′47″W
- Area: 48.5 acres (19.6 ha)
- Built: c. 1840, c. 1870, c. 1900
- MPS: Chatham County MRA
- NRHP reference No.: 85001461
- Added to NRHP: July 5, 1985

Dr. E. H. Ward Farm is a historic home and farm located near Bynum, Chatham County, North Carolina. The main house was built in sections during the mid-19th through early-20th century beginning about 1840. The earliest section is a 1 1/2-story, gable-roofed, two room log structure, that forms the rear of the main section. The main section was built about 1870, and is a one-story, gable-roofed frame structure with a simple gable-front porch. A one-story board-and-batten rear ell was added about 1900. Also on the property are the contributing office of Dr. Ward, carriage house and gear room, board-and-batten barn and log cribs, smokehouse and pen, and a small brick well house.

It was listed on the National Register of Historic Places in 1985.
