= Siler City City Hall =

- U.S. National Register of Historic Places
- Location within North Carolina Location within the United States
- Location: 311 N. Second Ave., Siler City, North Carolina
- Coordinates: 35°43′31″N 79°27′52″W
- Area: 0.6 acres (0.24 ha)
- Built: 1939-1940
- Built by: Markley, R.R.
- Architect: Phillips, Carl
- Architectural style: Colonial Revival
- NRHP reference No.: 98001302
- Added to NRHP: October 30, 1998

Siler City City Hall, also known as the Siler City Town Hall or Municipal Building, is a historic city hall located at Siler City, Chatham County, North Carolina. It is a two-story, T-shaped, seven-bay Colonial Revival style building. It is faced in granite and features a two-story, tetrastyle pedimented pavilion with a portico in antis. It is one of three extant Works Progress Administration buildings in Chatham County.

The building was constructed on the site of the former Thompson School, a private school that had operated in the late 1800s and that had been torn down in 1932. In 1939 the town signed an agreement to purchase the property for $6,701.

In February 1939, the town board of commissioners selected R. R. Markley, a Durham architect, to design the building and selected Carl Phillips, a Siler City contractor, to oversee construction. Granite for the construction was mined from the R. F. Hedrick quarry in Randolph County, and construction was completed in September 1940. The total cost of construction was $72,289, $51,000 of which was provided by a grant from the Works Progress Administration. Use of the building began in the autumn of 1940, and the formal dedication was held November 11, 1941.

It was listed on the National Register of Historic Places in 1998.
