= East Raleigh Street Historic District =

Historic district in North Carolina, United States

- U.S. National Register of Historic Places
- U.S. Historic district
- Location within North Carolina Location within the United States
- Location: 300-400 blocks of E. Second St., and 300-600 blocks of E. Raleigh St., Siler City, North Carolina
- Coordinates: 35°43′30″N 79°27′32″W
- Area: 7.1 acres (2.9 ha)
- Built: 1895
- Built by: Tippet, William H.; Turner, John W.
- Architectural style: Queen Anne, Tudor Revival
- NRHP reference No.: 00000488
- Added to NRHP: May 11, 2000

East Raleigh Street Historic District is a national historic district located at Siler City, Chatham County, North Carolina. The district encompasses 39 contributing buildings in a predominantly residential section of Siler City. They were built between about 1895 and 1945, and include representative examples of the Queen Anne and Tudor Revival architectural styles.

It was listed on the National Register of Historic Places in 2000.
