= Goldston Commercial Historic District =

Historic district in North Carolina, United States

- U.S. National Register of Historic Places
- U.S. Historic district
- Location within North Carolina Location within the United States
- Location: Roughly S. Bellevue and S. Main Sts. between W. Goldbar & C olonial Sts., Goldston, North Carolina
- Coordinates: 35°35′33″N 79°19′41″W
- Area: 5 acres (2.0 ha)
- Built: 1908
- Architectural style: Late 19th And Early 20th Century American Movements, Commercial Style
- NRHP reference No.: 87002014
- Added to NRHP: November 25, 1987

Goldston Commercial Historic District is a national historic district located at Goldston, Chatham County, North Carolina. The district encompasses 15 contributing buildings in the central business district of Goldston. The buildings date from about 1890 to 1935 and includes of rows of one and two-story brick flat-roofed commercial buildings. Notable buildings include the Bynum and Paschal Warehouse (c. 1895), the Bynum and Paschal/Second Farmer's Union Company Store (c. 1899), the First Farmer's Union Store (c. 1908), A.J. Goldston General Store (c. 1890), and McLaurin Grocery Store (c. 1930).

It was listed on the National Register of Historic Places in 1987.
