= Mount Vernon Springs Historic District =

Historic district in North Carolina, United States

- U.S. National Register of Historic Places
- U.S. Historic district
- Location within North Carolina Location within the United States
- Location: SR 1134 & SR 1135, near Bonlee, North Carolina
- Coordinates: 35°39′32″N 79°26′38″W
- Area: 122.3 acres (49.5 ha)
- Built: 1855
- Architectural style: Greek Revival, Gothic, Vernacular Victorian
- MPS: Chatham County MRA
- NRHP reference No.: 87002045
- Added to NRHP: December 3, 1987

Mount Vernon Springs Historic District is a national historic district located near Bonlee, Chatham County, North Carolina. The district encompasses 23 contributing buildings, 3 contributing sites, and 7 contributing structures in the rural village of Mount Vernon Springs. The village grew up near a locally famous mineral spring. Notable buildings include the Greek Revival style Female Dormitory of the Baptist Academy (1855), Gothic Revival style Mt. Vernon Springs Presbyterian Church (1885), the John C. Kirkman House (c. 1877), Robert P. Johnson House (c, 1883), and John M. Foust House (c. 1881 and c. 1910). Also located in the district are the Mt. Vernon Springs, the Baptist Academy Cemetery, and the Mt. Vernon Springs Presbyterian Church cemetery.

It was listed on the National Register of Historic Places in 1987.
