= North Third Avenue Historic District =

Historic district in North Carolina, United States

- U.S. National Register of Historic Places
- U.S. Historic district
- Location within North Carolina Location within the United States
- Location: Roughly bounded by N. Second Ave., E. Fourth St., N. Third Ave., and E. Third St., Siler City, North Carolina
- Coordinates: 35°43′34″N 79°27′47″W
- Area: 4.1 acres (1.7 ha)
- Built: c. 1890-1930
- Architect: Barton, Harry; Turner, John W.
- Architectural style: Classical Revival, Bungalow/craftsman, et al.
- NRHP reference No.: 00000824
- Added to NRHP: July 20, 2000

North Third Avenue Historic District is a national historic district located at Siler City, Chatham County, North Carolina. The district encompasses seven contributing buildings in a predominantly residential section of Siler City. They were built between about 1890 and 1930, and includes five primary residential dwellings and the First Baptist Church and parsonage. They are representative examples of the Classical Revival and Bungalow / American Craftsman architectural styles.

It was listed on the National Register of Historic Places in 2000.
