= DeGraffenreidt-Johnson House =

Historic house in North Carolina, United States

- U.S. National Register of Historic Places
- Location within North Carolina Location within the United States
- Location: SR 1346, near Silk Hope, North Carolina
- Coordinates: 35°46′37″N 79°18′15″W
- Area: 54 acres (22 ha)
- Built: 1850
- Architectural style: Greek Revival, Vernacular Greek Revival
- MPS: Chatham County MRA
- NRHP reference No.: 85001452
- Added to NRHP: July 5, 1985

DeGraffenreidt-Johnson House is a historic home located near Silk Hope, Chatham County, North Carolina. It was built about 1850, and is a two-story, three bay vernacular Greek Revival style frame dwelling. It features a low hipped roof and one-story porch. The house is almost identical to the nearby William P. Hadley House.

It was listed on the National Register of Historic Places in 1985.

In 2017, DeGraffenredt-Johnson House was moved to Maine to avoid the damage caused by Hurricane Irma.
