= Paschal-Womble House =

Historic house in North Carolina, United States

- U.S. National Register of Historic Places
- Location within North Carolina Location within the United States
- Location: 421 Main St., Goldston, North Carolina
- Coordinates: 35°35′40″N 79°19′44″W
- Area: 3.5 acres (1.4 ha)
- Built: 1889
- NRHP reference No.: 84001957
- Added to NRHP: April 26, 1984

Paschal-Womble House is a historic home located at Goldston, Chatham County, North Carolina. It was built in 1889, and is a two-story, three bay frame dwelling, with late-19th century additions. It sits on a brick foundation, triple gable roof, and has a one-story flat-roofed front porch with sawnwork decoration.

It was listed on the National Register of Historic Places in 1984.
