= William Alston Rives House =

Historic house in North Carolina, United States

- U.S. National Register of Historic Places
- Location within North Carolina Location within the United States
- Location: End of SR 2183 off SR 2187, near Goldston, North Carolina
- Coordinates: 35°37′24″N 79°18′22″W
- Area: 4 acres (1.6 ha)
- Built: c. 1825-1840
- Architectural style: Georgian, Federal
- MPS: Chatham County MRA
- NRHP reference No.: 85001459
- Added to NRHP: July 5, 1985

William Alston Rives House is a historic home located near Goldston, Chatham County, North Carolina. It dates to the period 1825–1840, and is a two-story, three bay Georgian / Federal style frame dwelling. Also on the property are the contributing a small covered well, a board and batten shed, a tobacco barn, a larger barn, and the Rives family cemetery.

It was listed on the National Register of Historic Places in 1985.
