= Cadmus N. Bray House =

Historic house in North Carolina, United States

- U.S. National Register of Historic Places
- Location within North Carolina Location within the United States
- Location: 229 W. Second Street, Siler City, North Carolina
- Coordinates: 35°43′25″N 79°27′42″W
- Area: 1.27 acres (0.51 ha)
- Built: 1906
- Built by: Turner, James W.
- Architectural style: Queen Anne, Colonial Revival
- NRHP reference No.: 99001620
- Added to NRHP: December 30, 1999

Cadmus N. Bray House is a historic house located at 229 West Second Street in Siler City, Chatham County, North Carolina. James W. Turner, a local builder, constructed the house, and it remains a nearly unaltered representative of early 20th century architectural preferences in a small North Carolina rail town.

== Description and history ==
The 2 1/2-story, Queen Anne/Colonial Revival style timber-framed residence was built in 1906 for Siler City businessman and town mayor, Cadmus Bray. It features multiple bay projections covered by a steeply pitched and cross-gabled hipped roof surmounted by a square frame balustrade and a wraparound porch.

It was listed on the National Register of Historic Places on December 30, 1999.
