= Bray-Paschal House =

Historic house in North Carolina, United States

- U.S. National Register of Historic Places
- Location within North Carolina Location within the United States
- Location: 2488 Wade Paschal Road, near Siler City, North Carolina
- Coordinates: 35°40′59″N 79°29′15″W
- Area: 6 acres (2.4 ha)
- Built: c. 1790, c. 1810, 1860
- Architectural style: log dwelling, Federal, Greek Revival
- MPS: Chatham County MRA
- NRHP reference No.: 11000973
- Added to NRHP: December 27, 2011

The Bray-Paschal House (also known as the Sheriff Richard Bray Paschal House and Sheriff R. B. Paschal House) is a historic house located at 2488 Wade Paschal Road near Siler City, Chatham County, North Carolina.

== Description and history ==
The oldest section dates to about 1790, and is a one-story, single-pen log house. Around 1810, a rear shed, engaged front porch and loft were added. In 1860, at the southwest corner, a two-story, vernacular Greek Revival-style frame addition was built. Also on the property is a contributing blacksmith shop, built in 1863, and a stable built in 1860.

It was listed on the National Register of Historic Places December 27, 2011.
