= Bill Bynum =

American banker and philanthropist

- Born: New York, New York, U.S.
- Education: University of North Carolina, Chapel Hill (BA)
- Occupation: Businessperson; Philanthropist

William J. Bynum is an American businessperson and philanthropist. Bynum is the chief executive officer and founder of Hope Enterprise Corporation, Hope Credit Union and the Hope Policy Institute, collectively known as HOPE.

== Early life and education ==
William J. Bynum was born in East Harlem in New York City. His parents were from North Carolina and when Bynum was five years old, his family left New York to return to North Carolina, settling in Bynum.

He attended the University of North Carolina Chapel Hill. He started as journalism major and shifted to psychology and political science, earning a double major. At the University, he was chair of the Black Student Movement. Bynum considered attending law school, and was accepted to the University of North Carolina's law school, but began working for a labor organization, which instilled his interest in employment and labor rights.

== Career ==
Bynum eventually began working for Center for Community Self-Help, helping to build the new business with the help of a $77 loan from local manufacturing workers. His desire to work in the credit union industry was inspired by Bynum's grandmother, who used to bank at a credit union which provided banking services to Black community members out of the garage of Bynum's high school principal. In 1989, he began working for the North Carolina Rural Center, providing microloans to low-income community members to start businesses.

In 1994, Bynum was contacted by George Penick, director of the Foundation For The Mid-South. Penick relocated from North Carolina to Mississippi, recruited by then Mississippi governor William Winter, to launch the foundation to support economic development in the state. Bynum had been inspired after hearing Winter lecture in North Carolina, and found the work Winter and Penick were doing in Mississippi interesting. Eventually, Bynum moved to Jackson, Mississippi to manage a $1.5 million grant made to the foundation to launch the Enterprise Corporation of the Delta, an independent nonprofit organization designed to support businesses and create quality jobs in the Delta region of Arkansas, Louisiana and Mississippi.

=== HOPE Credit Union ===
When Bynum joined a local church, the pastor Jeffery A. Stallworth, MDiv, BCC had the idea to start a credit union. The goal was to create an option for people using payday loan and alternative financial services. Bynum would spend his day working at the Enterprise Corporation and his free time working on the credit union project. Eventually, the Enterprise Corporation combined with Hope Credit Union. HOPE expanded from Jackson to New Orleans in 2004. The credit union now has locations throughout the south, including in Tennessee, Arkansas, and Alabama and serves more than 100,000 people. In June 2020, Netflix invested a $10 million deposit at HOPE to support economic development for Black communities.

=== Other work ===
Bynum is on the board of the NAACP Legal Defense Fund and the Aspen Institute, in addition to other organizations. He's a former member of the Department of Treasury advisory boards for the Community Development Financial Institutions Fund and the Consumer Financial Protection Bureau. In 2020, Bynum was named to the Joe Biden presidential transition team to support transition efforts related to the Consumer Financial Protection Bureau.

== Personal life ==
Bynum married Hope Simmons in 1988. They had one child. Hope died in 2019.

In 2008, Bynum was awarded the University of North Carolina's Distinguished Alumnus Award.

In 2021, Bynum received the 26th Annual Heinz Award for the Economy.
