= Denny P. Hadley House =

Historic house in Tennessee, United States

- U.S. National Register of Historic Places
- Location within Tennessee Location within the United States
- Location: Off US 31/Franklin Rd. S of Brentwood, Brentwood, Tennessee
- Coordinates: 35.981°N 86.822°W
- Area: 3.7 acres (1.5 ha)
- Built: c. 1840 and c. 1920
- Architect: Asa Vaughn
- Architectural style: Central passage plan
- MPS: Williamson County MRA
- NRHP reference No.: 88000283
- Added to NRHP: April 14, 1988

The Denny P. Hadley House is a house in Brentwood, Tennessee, United States, that dates from c.1840 and that was listed on the National Register of Historic Places in 1988. It has also been known as Green Pastures and as Hadleywood.

The structure is a two-story brick central passage plan house and other architecture. The house was considered notable as an example of brick ante-bellum central passage plan residence. When listed, the property included three contributing buildings and three non-contributing structures on an area of 3.7 acres (1.5 ha).

Denny Porterfield Hadley was born in 1797 and moved to Williamson County in 1808. In 1821, Hadley married Elizabeth Smith, and they were gifted 200 acres of land by her father. Around 1840, the Hadleys hired builder Asa Vaugn to build the house, with most construction materials coming from their farm. During the Civil War, the house was used several times as a campsite by both armies.

The NRHP-eligibility of the property was covered in a 1988 study of Williamson County historical resources.
