= Siler City Commercial Historic District =

Historic district in North Carolina, United States

- U.S. National Register of Historic Places
- U.S. Historic district
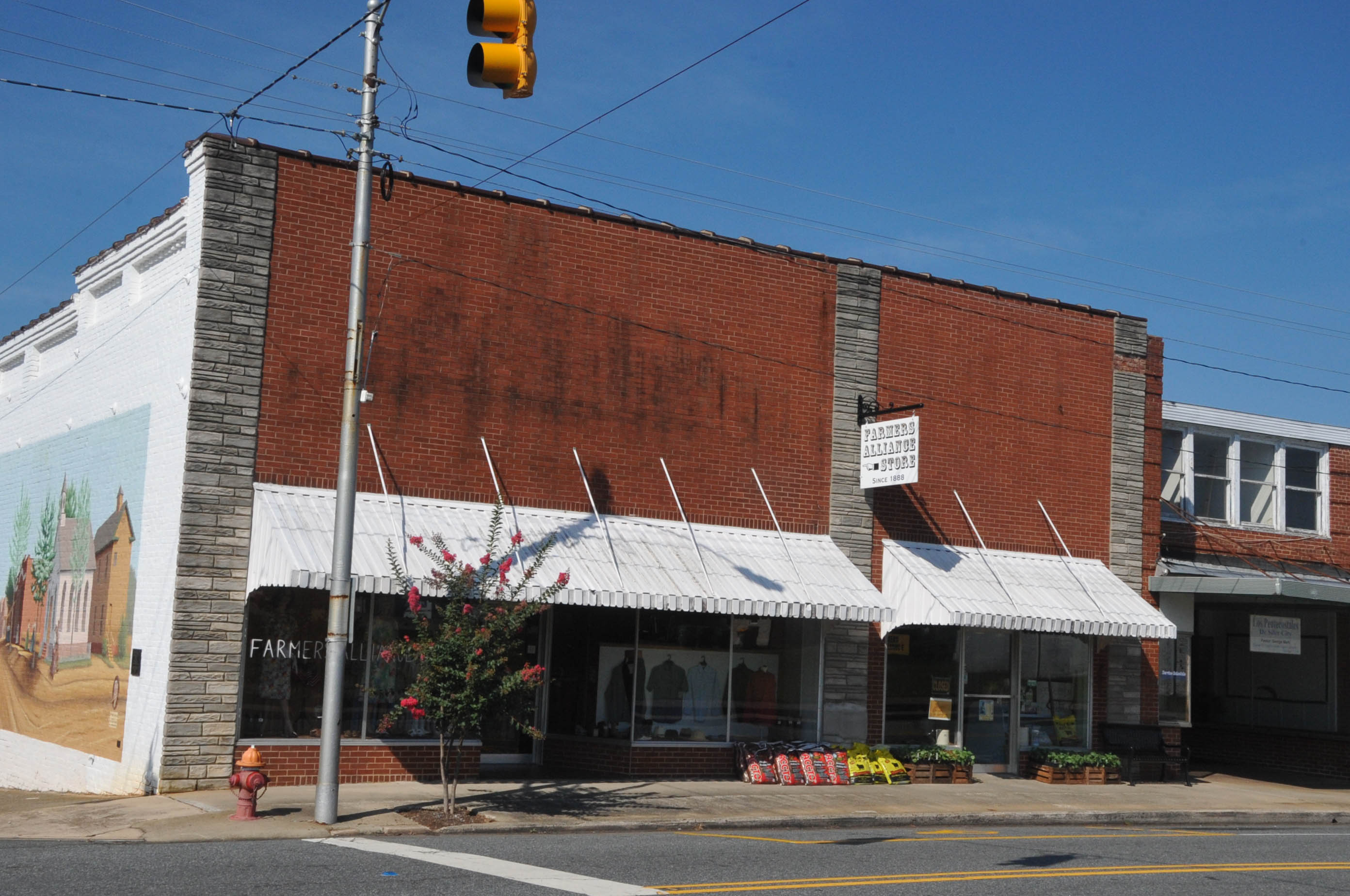
- Siler City Commercial Historic District, March 2007

- Location within North Carolina Location within the United States
- Location: Roughly bounded by Second Ave., Birch Ave., Third St. and Beaver St., Siler City, North Carolina
- Coordinates: 35°43′23″N 79°27′50″W
- Area: 6.2 acres (2.5 ha)
- Built: 1897
- Architectural style: Early Commercial, Colonial Revival
- NRHP reference No.: 00000841
- Added to NRHP: July 27, 2000

Siler City Commercial Historic District is a national historic district located at Siler City, Chatham County, North Carolina. The district encompasses 45 contributing buildings in the central business district of Siler City. They are primarily one- and two-story brick buildings dated between 1897 and 1945. Located in the district is the separately listed Hotel Hadley. Other notable buildings include the Farmers Alliance Store (1909), Edwards-Wren Building (1906), Chatham Bank (1913), Wren Building (1912), former Siler City Furniture Building (1928), Colonial Revival style United States Post Office (1940), Phillips Office Supplies Building, Thorpe and Associates Building, and Fred C. Justice Building.

It was listed on the National Register of Historic Places in 2000.
