= Brattain–Hadley House =

Former house in Springfield, Oregon, U.S.

- Formerly listed on the U.S. National Register of Historic Places
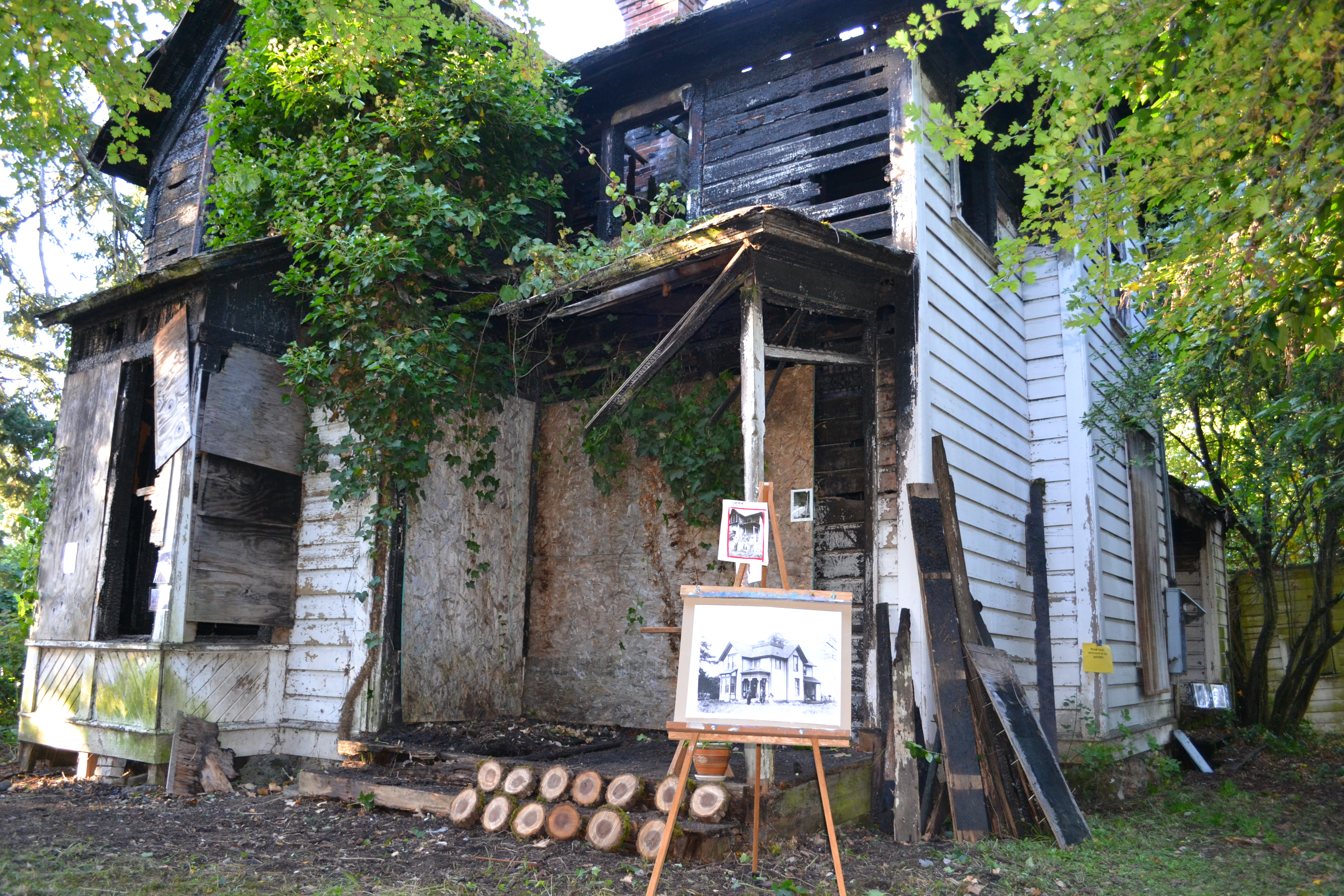
- The house in 2011, shortly before demolition

- Location within Oregon Location within the United States
- Location: 1260 Main Street; Springfield, Oregon
- Coordinates: 44°2′47″N 123°0′22″W
- Area: less than one acre
- Built: 1893
- Architect: John B. Innis
- Architectural style: Queen Anne
- NRHP reference No.: 95001099

Significant dates
- Added to NRHP: September 14, 1995
- Removed from NRHP: May 8, 2012

The Brattain–Hadley House was located in Springfield, Oregon, United States, and was formerly listed on the National Register of Historic Places. Fire destroyed much of the house in 1997, and in 2012 a demolition contractor removed the house for safety reasons.

Paul Brattain, an 1852 pioneer, obtained a 160-acre donation land claim soon after moving from Iowa to Oregon. The Brattain farm was entirely within modern Springfield city limits.

When Brattain died in 1893, his descendants built the Queen Anne style house. Paul Hadley, Brattain's grandson, was the last of Brattain's descendants to occupy the house in the 1940s. Hadley's daughter, Mary Hadley Callis, allowed vagrants to occupy the house until the 1997 fire. The house was removed from the National Register on May 8, 2012.

== See also ==
- National Register of Historic Places listings in Lane County, Oregon
