= Hotel Hadley =

Hotel building in North Carolina, US

- U.S. National Register of Historic Places
- U.S. Historic district – Contributing property
- Location within North Carolina Location within the United States
- Location: 103 N. Chatham St., Siler City, North Carolina
- Coordinates: 35°43′24″N 79°27′49″W
- Area: 1 acre (0.40 ha)
- Built: 1907
- Architectural style: Late Victorian, Eclectic Victorian
- MPS: Chatham County MRA
- NRHP reference No.: 85001456
- Added to NRHP: July 5, 1985

Hotel Hadley is a historic hotel building located at Siler City, Chatham County, North Carolina. Built by local industrialist Franklin Minter Hadley, construction began in 1907 and the hotel officially opened in 1908. The structure is a two-story brick building with elaborate eclectic Victorian design elements. It served as the city's most desirable hotel and as Hadley's residence into the 1940s.

It was listed on the National Register of Historic Places in 1985. It is located in the Siler City Commercial Historic District.
