= Siler City High School =

Historic school building in North Carolina, United States

- U.S. National Register of Historic Places
- Location within North Carolina Location within the United States
- Location: 119 S. Third Ave., Siler City, North Carolina
- Coordinates: 35°43′23″N 79°27′36″W
- Area: 6.7 acres (2.7 ha)
- Built: 1922
- Architect: Wilson, C.C.; Bray, Bun B.
- Architectural style: Art Deco
- NRHP reference No.: 98000873
- Added to NRHP: July 15, 1998

Siler City High School, also known as the Paul Braxton School, is a historic high school building located at Siler City, Chatham County, North Carolina. It was built in 1922, and is a two-story, T-shaped, five-bay brick school building with streamlined Art Deco design elements. It has a two-story-high auditorium wing. Also on the property are the contributing mid-1930s one-story brick woodworking shop building which now serves as a community center, a 1 1/2-story frame gymnasium begun in 1930, and an early 1930s dirt baseball field which was initially a football field.

It was listed on the National Register of Historic Places in 1998.
