= Gregson-Hadley House =

Historic house in North Carolina, United States

- U.S. National Register of Historic Places
- Location within North Carolina Location within the United States
- Location: 322 E. Raleigh St., Siler City, North Carolina
- Coordinates: 35°43′27″N 79°27′34″W
- Area: 0.5 acres (0.20 ha)
- Built: c. 1903
- Architect: Tippet, W.H.
- Architectural style: Queen Anne
- MPS: Chatham County MRA
- NRHP reference No.: 85001454
- Added to NRHP: July 5, 1985

Gregson-Hadley House is a historic home located at Siler City, Chatham County, North Carolina. The house was built in approximately 1903, and is named for leading Siler City industrialist Julius Clarence Gregson, for whom it was built, and his brother-in-law Wade Hadley, to whom it was sold in 1920. It is a 1 1/2-story, richly decorated Queen Anne style dwelling. It features an exaggerated hip roof with several projecting gables, a pentagonal corner turret, and Eastlake movement wraparound porch.

It was listed on the National Register of Historic Places in 1985.
