= Chatham County Schools =

School district in North Carolina, United States

The Chatham County Public School System is a school district located in Chatham County, North Carolina, and is operated by an elected school board. As of 2026, the school district operates 20 schools throughout the county.

== High schools ==
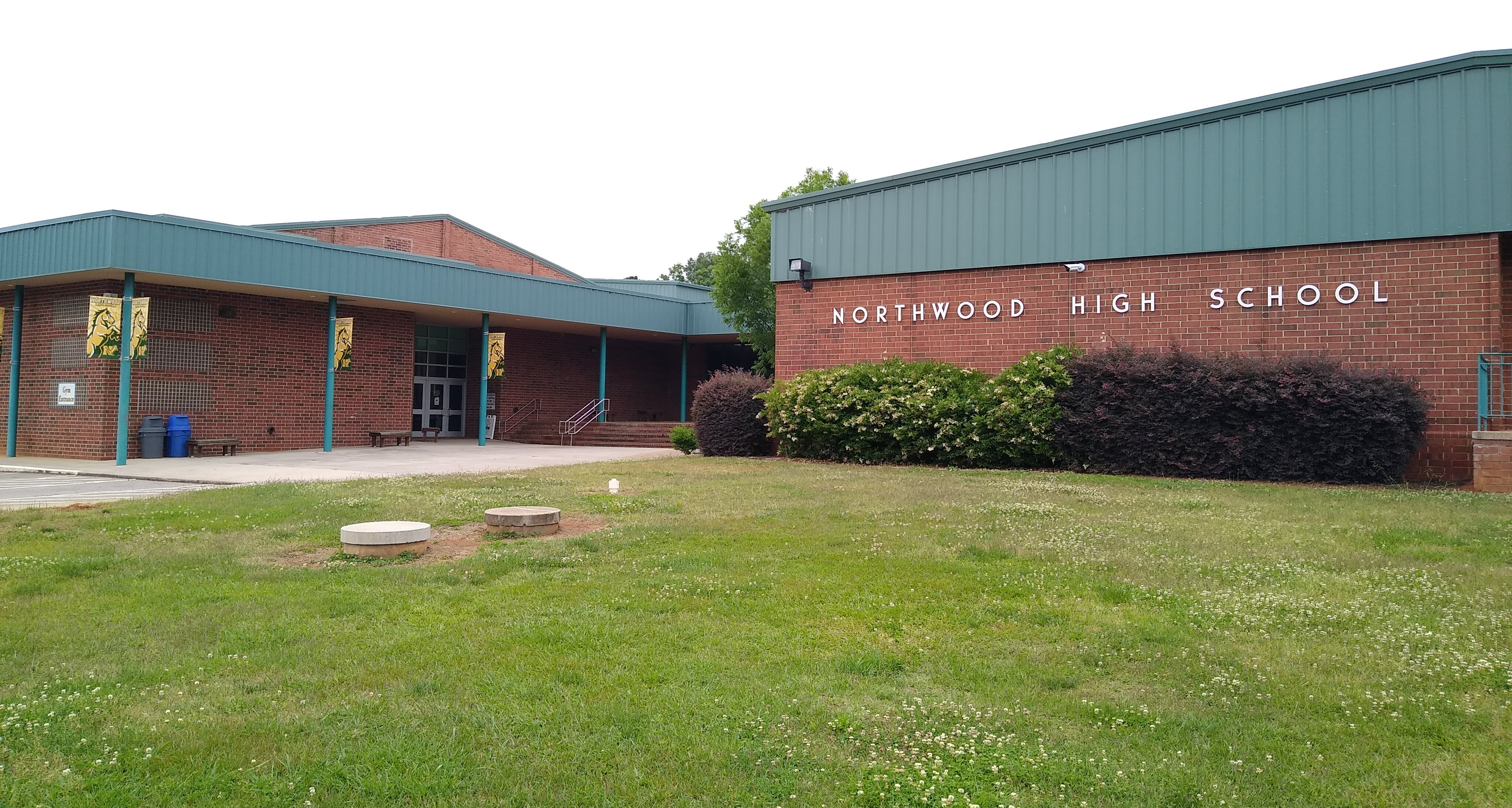
Northwood High School

There are four traditional public high schools and an early college:

- Northwood High School
- Jordan-Matthews High School
- Chatham Central High School
- Seaforth High School
- Chatham Early College

== Alternative Education ==
- ONE Academy (6-12)

== Middle schools ==
The district operates three middle schools:

- Chatham Middle School
- Margaret B. Pollard Middle School
- Horton Middle School

== Elementary Schools & Primary Schools ==
The district operates six elementary schools:

- Chatham Grove Elementary School
- North Chatham Elementary School
- Perry W. Harrison Elementary School
- Pittsboro Elementary School (K-4)
- Siler City Elementary School
- Virginia Cross Elementary School

The district also operates five K-8 schools:

- Bennett School
- Bonlee School
- J.S. Waters School
- Moncure School
- Silk Hope School

There is also a More at Four pre-kindergarten program at several schools in the county.

== Bennett School controversy ==
In 2006, the Chatham County Board of Education announced that they were repealing a decision that allowed students that lived in the Randolph County portion of Bennett to attend Bennett School, the local K-8 school, free of charge. For years students from both counties that lived in Bennett were allowed to attend the school free under a memorandum of understanding between the two counties made many years ago. The announcement that the memorandum was being repealed stirred a firestorm of controversy, since the Randolph County students would be considered out-of-district students and could therefore be charged hundreds of dollars each year to attend school in Chatham County. The commute to the nearest Randolph County school was also a problem since it is located many miles from Bennett. To date, the Chatham County board has stood by its decision despite numerous complaints from residents.
