= Siler City, North Carolina =

- Town
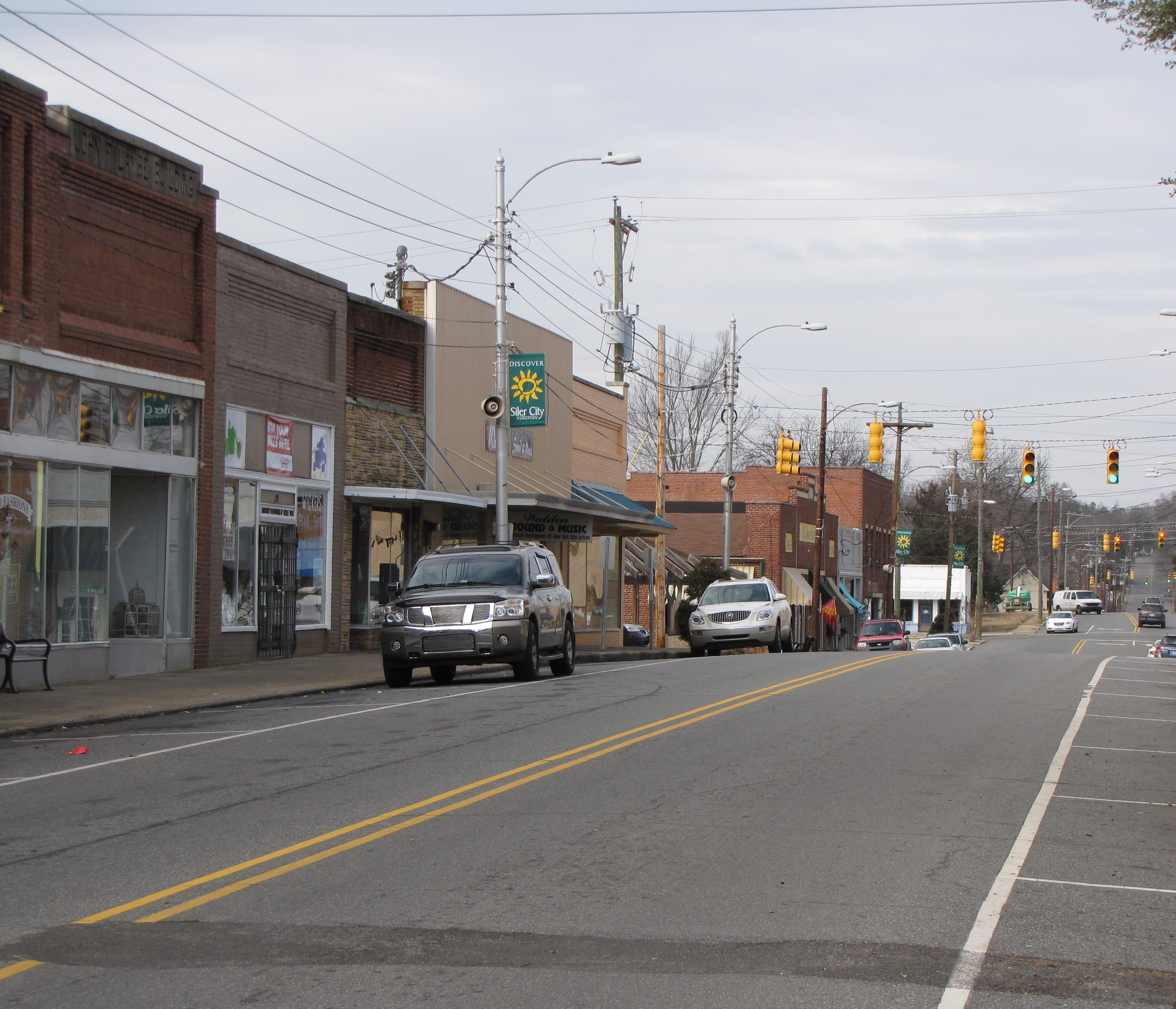
- North Chatham Avenue, downtown

- Seal
- Motto: "Balanced for Progress"
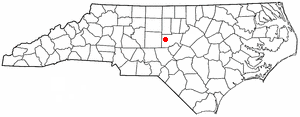
- Location of Siler City, North Carolina
- Coordinates: 35°43′31″N 79°27′22″W
- Country: United States
- State: North Carolina
- County: Chatham

Area
  - Total: 6.07 sq mi (15.72 km^{2})
  - Land: 6.05 sq mi (15.66 km^{2})
  - Water: 0.019 sq mi (0.05 km^{2})
- Elevation: 646 ft (197 m)

Population (2020)
  - Total: 7,702
  - Density: 1,273.4/sq mi (491.68/km^{2})
- Time zone: UTC-5 (Eastern (EST))
  - Summer (DST): UTC-4 (EDT)
- ZIP code: 27344
- Area code: 919
- FIPS code: 37-61860
- GNIS feature ID: 2407337
- Website: www.silercity.org

Siler City is a town in western Chatham County, North Carolina, United States. As of the 2020 census, the town's population was 7,702.

== History ==
Siler City began when Plikard Dederic Siler and his wife, Elizabeth Hartsoe Siler, settled about four miles north of the town's current location. The couple briefly lived in Pennsylvania, then Virginia, and then settled near Lacy's Creek (the location near today's Siler City). They had 10 children.

In recent years, Siler City has become a suburb of Greensboro and the Research Triangle Park.

The Bowen-Jordan Farm, Cadmus N. Bray House, Bray-Paschal House, East Raleigh Street Historic District, Gregson-Hadley House, Former High Point Bending and Chair Company, Hotel Hadley, North Third Avenue Historic District, Siler City City Hall, Siler City Commercial Historic District, Siler City High School, Snipes-Fox House, William Teague House, and Burdett Woody House are listed on the National Register of Historic Places.

== Geography ==
Siler City is located in western Chatham County. U.S. Route 64 passes through the northern part of the town as 11th Street, leading east 16 miles (26 km) to Pittsboro, the Chatham County seat, and west 21 miles (34 km) to Asheboro. U.S. Route 421 bypasses Siler City to the northeast, with access from Exits 168, 171, and 174. US 421 leads northwest 32 miles (51 km) to Greensboro and southeast 24 miles (39 km) to Sanford.

According to the United States Census Bureau, the town has a total area of 6.0 square miles (15.6 km^{2}), of which 0.02 square miles (0.06 km^{2}), or 0.37%, is water.

Loves Creek, a tributary to the Rocky River is the main watershed that drains Siler City.

== Demographics ==
The population has increased by 75% from 1990 to the 2016 estimate, as workers have been attracted to new jobs in the poultry processing industry.

Historical population
Census	Pop.	Note	%±
1890	254		—
1900	440		73.2%
1910	895		103.4%
1920	1,253		40.0%
1930	1,730		38.1%
1940	2,197		27.0%
1950	2,501		13.8%
1960	4,455		78.1%
1970	4,689		5.3%
1980	4,446		−5.2%
1990	4,808		8.1%
2000	6,966		44.9%
2010	7,887		13.2%
2020	7,702		−2.3%
2025 (est.)	8,155	▲	5.9%
U.S. Decennial Census

=== 2020 census ===
Siler City Racial Composition
Race	Num.	Perc.
White	1,931	25.07%
Black or African American	1,458	18.93%
Native American	5	0.06%
Asian	88	1.14%
Pacific Islander	1	0.01%
Other/Mixed	291	3.78%
Hispanic or Latino	3,928	51.0%

As of the 2020 census, Siler City had a population of 7,702 and 1,773 families. The median age was 34.7 years. 29.1% of residents were under the age of 18 and 14.0% of residents were 65 years of age or older. For every 100 females there were 90.5 males, and for every 100 females age 18 and over there were 87.1 males age 18 and over.

98.1% of residents lived in urban areas, while 1.9% lived in rural areas.

There were 2,696 households in Siler City, of which 41.0% had children under the age of 18 living in them. Of all households, 36.7% were married-couple households, 19.4% were households with a male householder and no spouse or partner present, and 36.6% were households with a female householder and no spouse or partner present. About 27.0% of all households were made up of individuals and 12.1% had someone living alone who was 65 years of age or older.

There were 2,918 housing units, of which 7.6% were vacant. The homeowner vacancy rate was 1.4% and the rental vacancy rate was 4.8%.

=== 2010 census ===
As of the census of 2010, there were 7,887 people, 2,603 households, and 1,802 families residing in the town. The population density was 507.4 people/km^{2} (1,314 people/mi^{2}). There were 2,890 housing units (2,603 of which were occupied) at an average density of 186.0/km^{2} (482/mi^{2}). The racial makeup of the town was 44.0% White, 19.1% African American, 1.7% Native American, 0.4% Asian, 0.2% Pacific Islander, 31.1% some other race, and 3.4% from two or more races. Hispanic or Latino of any ethnicity comprised 49.8% of the population.

There were 2,603 households, out of which 43.2% had children under the age of 18 living with them, 43.1% were headed by married couples living together, 18.4% had a female householder with no husband present, and 30.8% were non-families. 25.2% of all households were made up of individuals, and 11.1% were someone living alone who was 65 years of age or older. The average household size was 2.94, and the average family size was 3.50.

In the town, the population was spread out, with 29.8% under the age of 18, 11.0% from 18 to 24, 28.4% from 25 to 44, 18.9% from 45 to 64, and 12.1% who were 65 years of age or older. The median age was 31.1 years. For every 100 females there were 96.5 males. For every 100 females age 18 and over, there were 92.5 males.

=== Income and poverty ===
For the period 2009–13, the estimated median annual income for a household in the town was $30,676, and the median income for a family was $34,838. Male full-time workers had a median income of $27,732 versus $24,877 for females. The per capita income for the town was $14,234. About 15.5% of families and 22.2% of the population were below the poverty line, including 34.4% of those under age 18 and 7.9% of those age 65 or over.

== Government and infrastructure ==
The North Carolina Department of Public Safety (formerly the North Carolina Department of Juvenile Justice and Delinquency Prevention) operates the Chatham Youth Development Center juvenile correctional facility in the Central Carolina Business Park in Siler City. The facility, which opened in 2008, serves both boys and girls.

== Education ==
Siler City is part of the Chatham County Public Schools District, with Jordan-Matthews High School, One Academy, Chatham Early College, Chatham Middle School, Siler City Elementary School and Virginia Cross Elementary School serving the town. Chatham Charter High School is also located in Siler City, as well as Chatham Charter School.

== Media ==
=== Print ===
Siler City and the rest of Chatham County is served by The Chatham News, a weekly newspaper based in Siler City.

=== Radio ===
Siler City is home to WNCA, which broadcasts on AM 1570. The station went on the air in 1952. WNCA airs a variety of programming, including local news, local sports, and a swap shop program. The station also airs Adult contemporary music, oldies and beach music.

== Airport ==
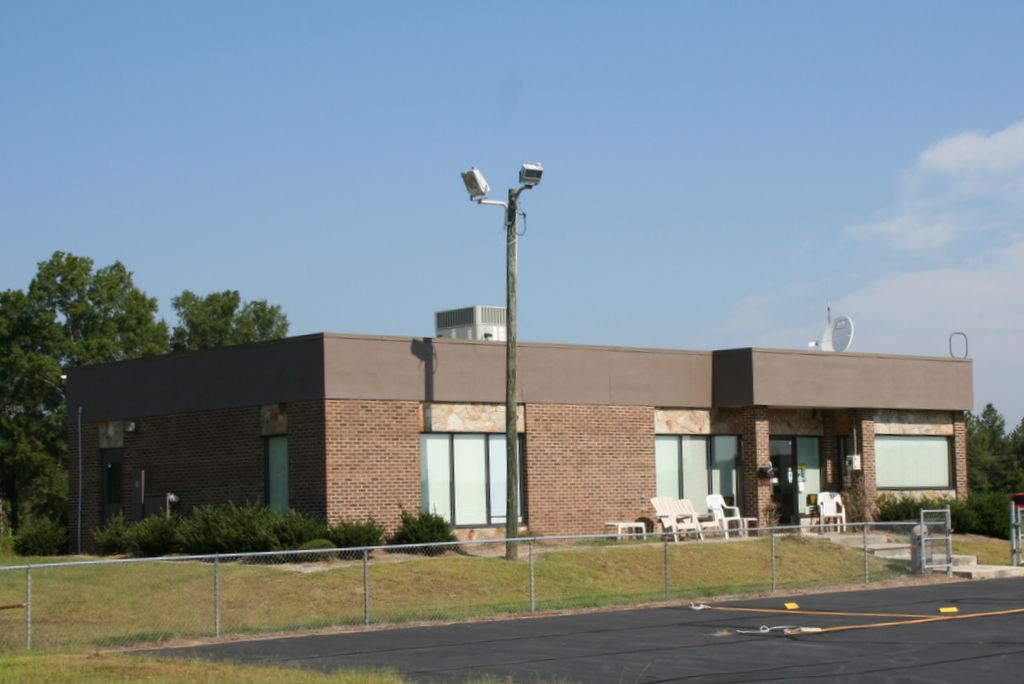
Terminal building, Siler City Airport

Siler City Municipal Airport (5W8) is a single-runway airport located 3 miles (5 km) southwest of downtown Siler City. The airport is used both by local residents and as a refueling stop for transiting military and general aviation aircraft.

== In popular culture ==
- Siler City was featured in episode 140 (season 5, episode 13) of The Andy Griffith Show (December 14, 1964) as the place where Andy and Helen were taken by a game warden for fishing without a license. The city was featured again on The Andy Griffith Show (11 January 1965) in episode 143, (season 5, episode 17) as the home of Sheriff Jackson, who visits Andy to see how Mayberry does traffic safety, and once more (January 1, 1968) in a cooking show on the local TV station. In this episode, Andy described the city as only a 25-minute drive from Mayberry.
- The town was the setting for Paul Cuadros' book, A Home on the Field: How One Championship Soccer Team Inspires Hope for the Revival of Small Town America (2006), a non-fiction account of his experience coaching a majority-Latino soccer team at the high school to a state championship in spite of adversity faced by the students.

== Notable people ==
- Lowell Bailey (born 1981), biathlon coach and former Olympic biathlon athlete
- Frances Bavier (1902–1989), actress best remembered for her role as Aunt Bee on The Andy Griffith Show, a 1960s television sitcom set in North Carolina, lived here in retirement and is buried here
- George Edwards (born 1967), NFL coach
