= Wilsonville, North Carolina =

Unincorporated crossroads in North Carolina, US

Coordinates: 35°44′12″N 79°00′01″W

Wilsonville is an unincorporated crossroads along U.S. Route 64 between Pittsboro and Apex at B. Everett Jordan Lake in Chatham County, North Carolina, United States. The area, which is lightly populated, is a geographical reference point for people travelling around Chatham County and Jordan Lake and is home to two gas stations and a liquor store. The main feature of Wilsonville is the Jordan Lake State Recreation Area and several nearby public beaches and campgrounds, including Ebeneezer Beach, Seaforth Beach, and Crosswinds, Parker's Creek, Poplar Point, and Vista Point campgrounds. Five miles southeast is the unincorporated community of New Hill.
