= London House =

London House may refer to:

- London House, Aldersgate Street, for about one hundred years after Restoration (1660) it was the residence of the Bishop of London
- London House (Chicago), a hotel and former jazz club and restaurant in Chicago
- London House (Johannesburg) (built 1936), a building in the city of Johannesburg constructed by the firm of Emily and Williamson
- London House for Overseas Graduates, now Goodenough College, a postgraduate residence and educational trust in central London

== Music ==
- After Hours at the London House (1959), a live album by American jazz singer Sarah Vaughan
- The London House Sessions (recorded 1961, released 1996), a live compilation album by Oscar Peterson

== See also ==
- Henry Adolphus London House, a historic home located at Pittsboro, Chatham County, North Carolina
- Open House London, an event which promotes appreciation of architecture by the general public
- The name of City Hall, London during the Olympic Games, 2012
