= Terry House =

Terry House may refer to:

- William L. Terry House, Little Rock, Arkansas, listed on the National Register of Historic Places (NRHP) in Pulaski County
- Pike–Fletcher–Terry House, Little Rock, Arkansas, NRHP-listed in Pulaski County
- Terry-Hayden House, Bristol, Connecticut, NRHP-listed in Hartford County
- Isham-Terry House, Hartford, Connecticut, NRHP-listed in Hartford County
- Terry House (Rochester Hills, Michigan), one of Michigan State Historic Sites in Oakland County
- Terry-Ketcham Inn, Center Moriches, New York, NRHP-listed in Suffolk County
- Terry-Mulford House, Orient, New York, NRHP-listed in Suffolk County
- A. P. Terry House, Pittsboro, North Carolina, NRHP-listed in Chatham County
- Terry House (Poteau, Oklahoma), NRHP-listed in Oklahoma County
- Carter–Terry–Call House, Orem, Utah, NRHP-listed in Utah County

== See also ==
- Terry Hall (disambiguation)
- Terry Block Building, Bentonville, Arkansas, listed on the National Register of Historic Places (NRHP) in Benton County
- Terry's Plain Historic District, Simsbury, Connecticut, NRHP-listed in Hartford County
- Terry Park Ballfield, Fort Myers, Florida, NRHP-listed in Lee County
