= Eugene Daniel (disambiguation) =

Eugene Daniel (born 1961) is an American football player.

Eugene Daniel(s) may also refer to:

- Eugene Daniels (born 1989), American journalist
- A 1921 lynching of Eugene Daniel
