= Patrick St. Lawrence House =

Historic house in North Carolina, United States

- U.S. National Register of Historic Places
- U.S. Historic district – Contributing property
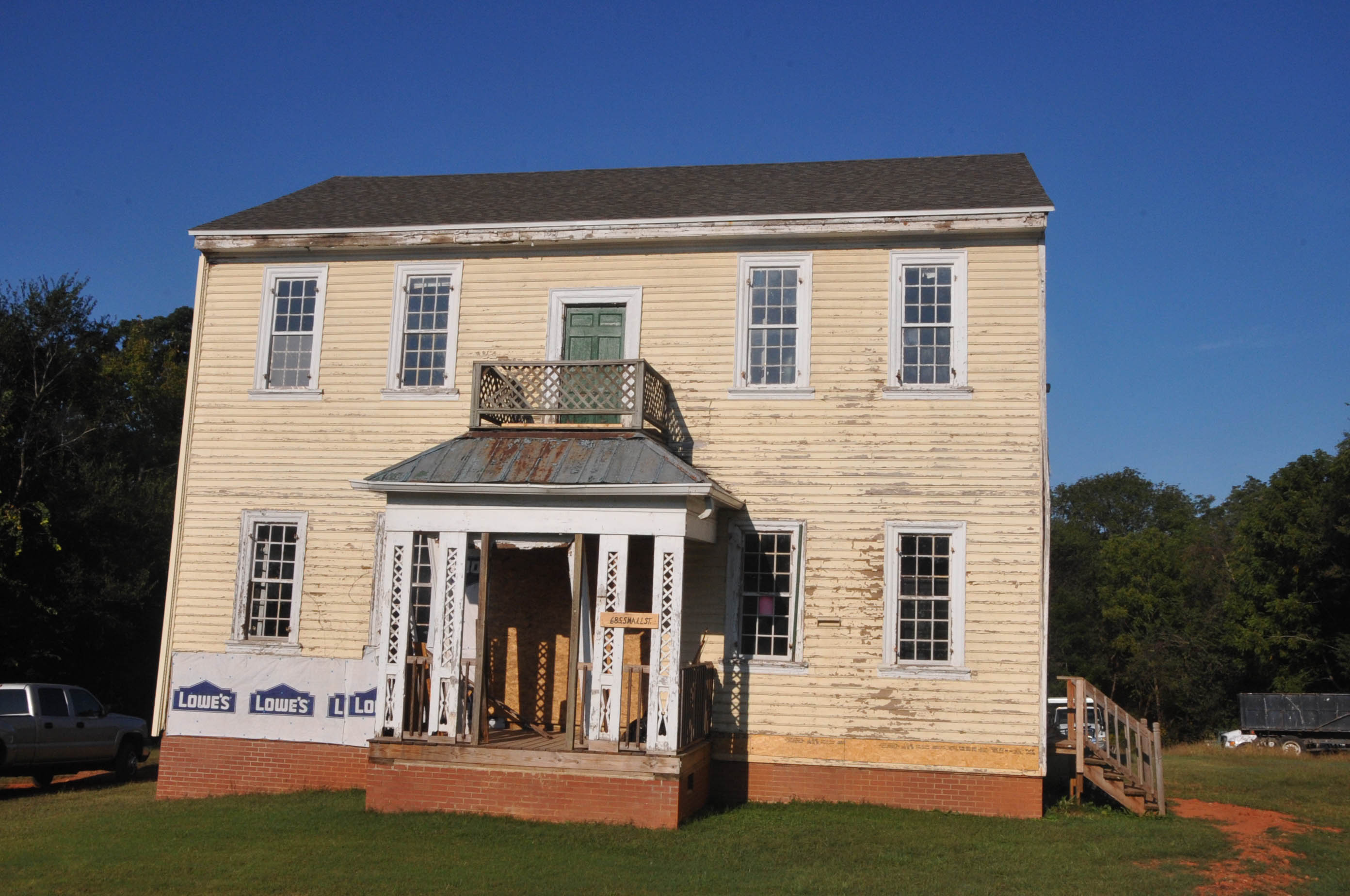
- Patrick St. Lawrence House, March 2007

- Location within North Carolina Location within the United States
- Location: Address Restricted, Pittsboro, North Carolina
- Coordinates: 35.71921°N 79.17359°W
- Area: 3.5 acres (1.4 ha)
- Built: c. 1787
- Architectural style: Georgian
- MPS: Pittsboro MRA
- NRHP reference No.: 82001291
- Added to NRHP: October 5, 1982

Patrick St. Lawrence House, also known as the Yellow House, is a historic home located at Pittsboro, Chatham County, North Carolina. It was built about 1790, and is a two-story, center hall Georgian style architecture frame dwelling with a low gable roof. It was originally built as an inn and overlooked the courthouse square. It is Pittsboro's oldest building. It has been moved three times and is now located on S. Small St.

It was listed on the National Register of Historic Places in 1982. It is located in the Pittsboro Historic District.
