= Aspen Hall (Pittsboro, North Carolina) =

Historic house in North Carolina, United States

- U.S. National Register of Historic Places
- Location within North Carolina Location within the United States
- Location: West of Pittsboro on US 64, near Pittsboro, North Carolina
- Coordinates: 35°43′56.8″N 79°15′47.6″W
- Area: 26 acres (11 ha)
- Built: 1790s
- Architectural style: Greek Revival, Georgian, Federal
- NRHP reference No.: 82003441
- Added to NRHP: July 29, 1982

Aspen Hall is a historic plantation house located near Pittsboro, Chatham County, North Carolina. The original section was built in the 1790s, and took its present form between about 1830 and 1840. It is a two-story, weatherboarded gable roofed Federal style frame house, with a Greek Revival style facade. It was built by Joseph John "Chatham Jack" Alston, who enslaved as many as 163 people and also built the nearby Alston-DeGraffenried Plantation.

It was listed on the National Register of Historic Places in 1982.

See Elias Hall for a description of who built this house.
