= McClenahan House =

Historic house in North Carolina, United States

- U.S. National Register of Historic Places
- U.S. Historic district – Contributing property
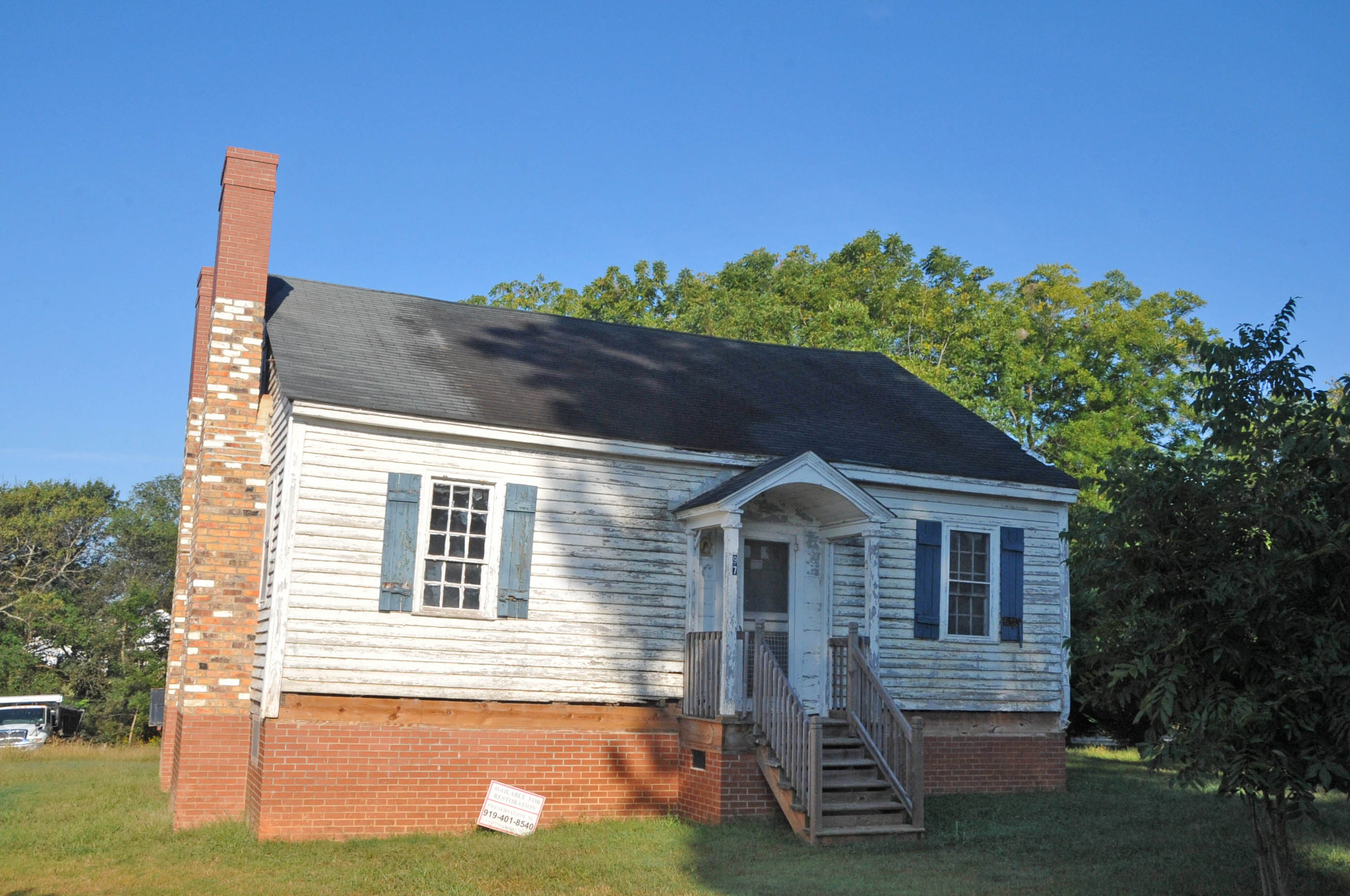
- McClenahan House, March 2007

- Location within North Carolina Location within the United States
- Location: Address Restricted, Pittsboro, North Carolina
- Coordinates: 35.71942°N 79.17355°W
- Area: 3.5 acres (1.4 ha)
- Architectural style: Greek Revival, Federal
- MPS: Pittsboro MRA
- NRHP reference No.: 82001288
- Added to NRHP: October 5, 1982

McClenahan House is a historic home located at Pittsboro, Chatham County, North Carolina. It was built before 1830, and is a one-story, three-bay, frame dwelling on a brick foundation with Greek Revival and Federal style design elements. The house began as a one-room house and is one of only four buildings in Pittsboro that dates from the settlement era.

It was listed on the National Register of Historic Places in 1982. It is located in the Pittsboro Historic District.
