= Reid House (Pittsboro, North Carolina) =

Historic house in North Carolina, United States

- U.S. National Register of Historic Places
- U.S. Historic district – Contributing property
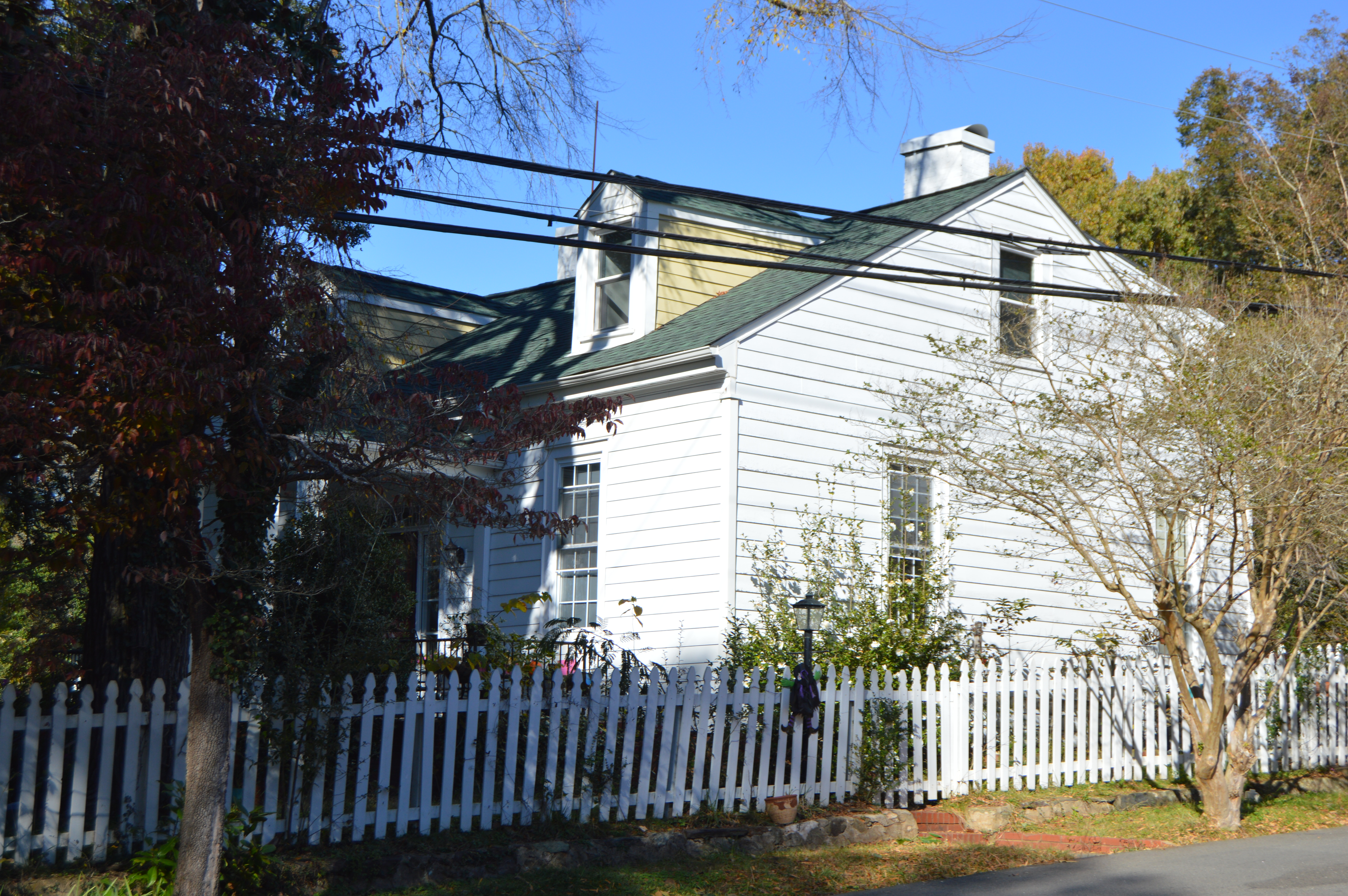
- Front and eastern side

- Location within North Carolina Location within the United States
- Location: 200 W. Salisbury St., Pittsboro, North Carolina
- Coordinates: 35°43′18″N 79°10′47″W
- Area: 0.5 acres (0.20 ha)
- Built: c. 1850
- Architectural style: Greek Revival, Federal
- MPS: Pittsboro MRA
- NRHP reference No.: 82001290
- Added to NRHP: October 5, 1982

Reid House is a historic home located at Pittsboro, Chatham County, North Carolina. It was built about 1850, and is a 1 1/2-story, three-bay, Federal / Greek Revival style double-pile plan frame dwelling. It has a broad gable roof and two interior chimneys. The house was renovated in the 1930s.

It was listed on the National Register of Historic Places in 1982. It is located in the Pittsboro Historic District.
