= Kelvin (Pittsboro, North Carolina) =

Historic house in North Carolina, United States

- U.S. National Register of Historic Places
- Location within North Carolina Location within the United States
- Location: 503 W. Salisbury St., Pittsboro, North Carolina
- Coordinates: 35°43′16″N 79°11′3″W
- Area: less than one acre
- Built: c. 1831, c. 1838
- Architectural style: Federal
- MPS: Pittsboro MRA
- NRHP reference No.: 82001286
- Added to NRHP: October 5, 1982

Kelvin was a historic home located at Pittsboro, Chatham County, North Carolina. It was built about 1831, was a two-story, five bay Federal style single pile frame dwelling. The house had a gable roof and exterior end chimneys. It had a one-story addition built about 1838. It originally housed a private girls school established by wealthy landowner Colonel Edward Jones Kelvin. It has been demolished.

It was listed on the National Register of Historic Places in 1982.
