= Baldwin's Mill =

Historic district in North Carolina, United States

- U.S. National Register of Historic Places
- U.S. Historic district
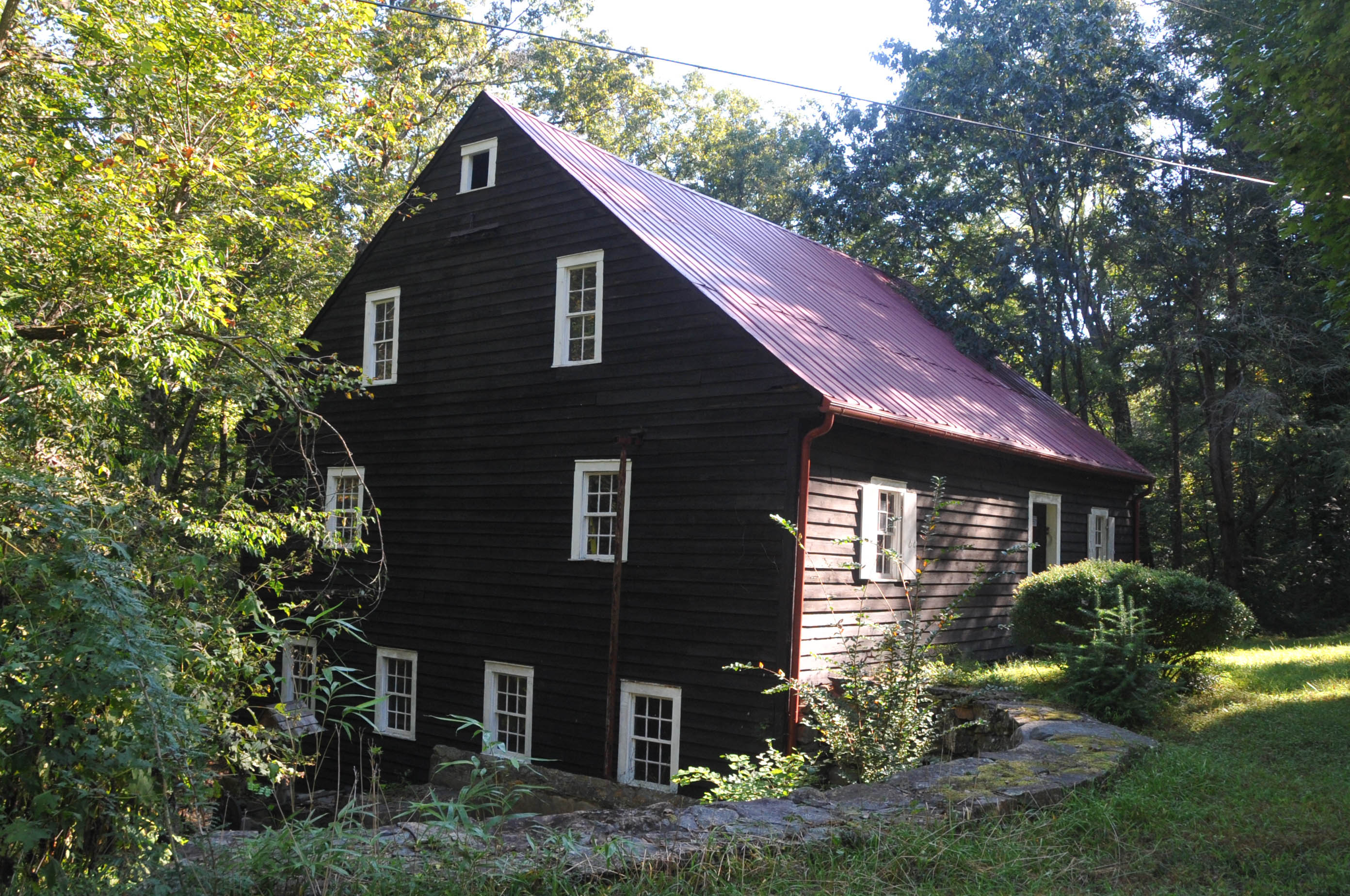
- Baldwin's Mill, March 2007

- Location within North Carolina Location within the United States
- Location: SR 1520, near Pittsboro, North Carolina
- Coordinates: 35°49′35″N 79°14′04″W
- Area: 10 acres (4.0 ha)
- NRHP reference No.: 86000007
- Added to NRHP: January 2, 1986

Baldwin's Mill is a historic grist mill and national historic district located near Pittsboro, Chatham County, North Carolina. The district encompasses one contributing building and three contributing structures. The mill was probably built by 1807, is a 1 1/2- to 2 1/2-story, heavy timber-framed structure approximately 30 feet by 40 feet. Associated with the mill are the mill dam, and mill and tail races. The property also includes a stretch of roadbed dates to about 1820, a blacksmith's shop site (c. 1880), and two log cabins (c. 1830) moved to the property in 1975. The mill ceased operation in the late 1920s. It was restored to working order in 1941.

It was listed on the National Register of Historic Places in 1986.
