= Pittsboro, North Carolina =

- Town
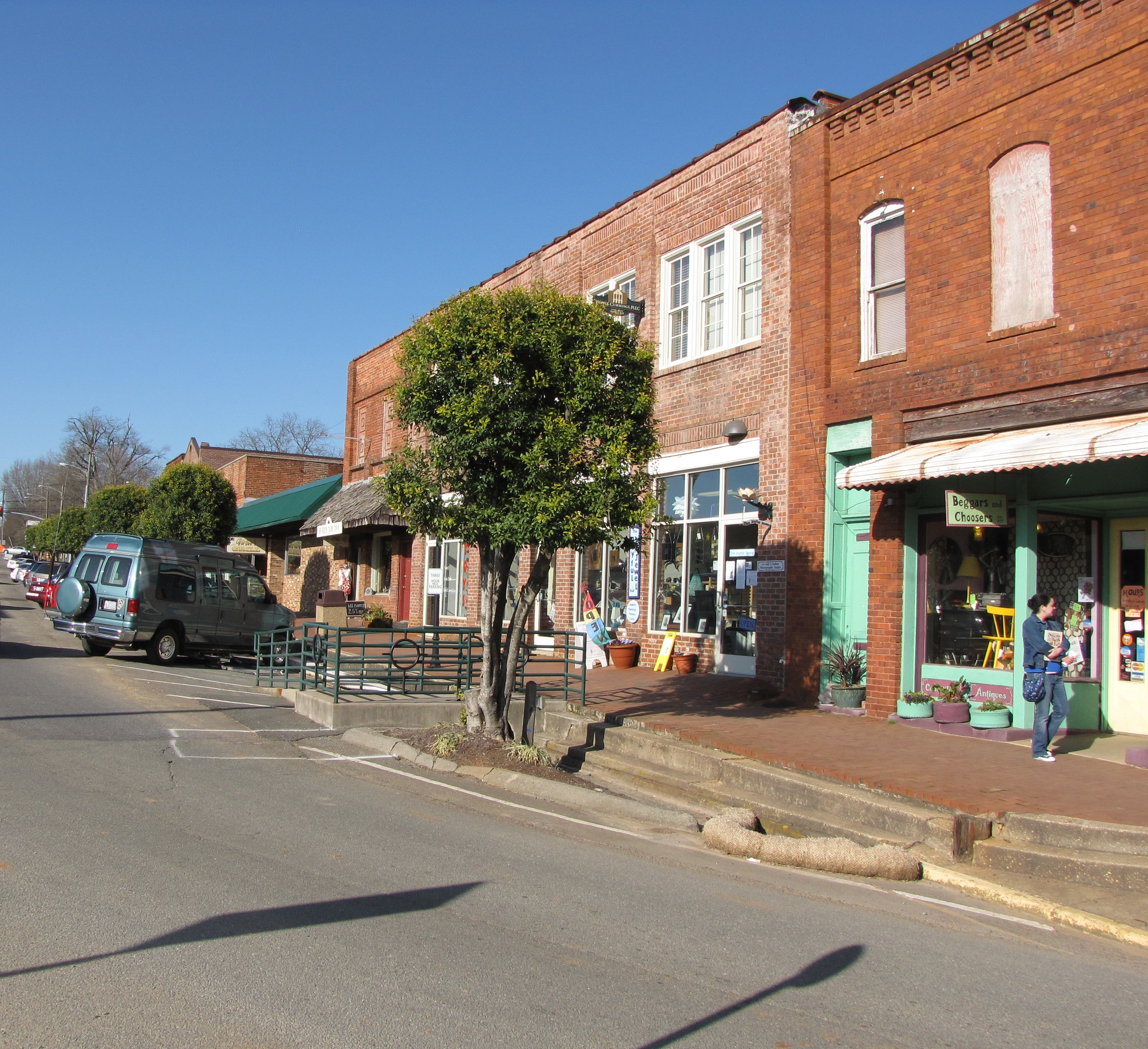
- Hillsboro Street in downtown Pittsboro

- Seal
- Nickname: Circle City
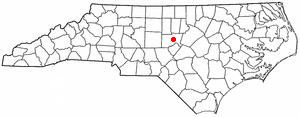
- Location of Pittsboro, North Carolina
- Coordinates: 35°43′40″N 79°10′10″W
- Country: United States
- State: North Carolina
- County: Chatham

Government
  - Mayor: Kyle Shipp

Area
  - Total: 5.52 sq mi (14.29 km^{2})
  - Land: 5.49 sq mi (14.21 km^{2})
  - Water: 0.031 sq mi (0.08 km^{2})
- Elevation: 466 ft (142 m)

Population (2020)
  - Total: 4,537
  - Density: 826.8/sq mi (319.24/km^{2})
- Time zone: UTC-5 (Eastern (EST))
  - Summer (DST): UTC-4 (EDT)
- ZIP codes: 27228, 27312
- Area code: 919 / 984
- FIPS code: 37-52660
- GNIS feature ID: 2407130
- Website: pittsboronc.gov

Pittsboro is a town in and the county seat of Chatham County, North Carolina, United States. The population was 3,743 at the 2010 census and 4,537 at the 2020 census.

The town was established in the late 18th century, shortly after the American Revolution, as the county seat for the newly formed Chatham County. In the years leading up to the American Civil War, the economy was dominated by small-scale farms that relied heavily on enslaved labor. In the aftermath of the civil war, racial tensions were high, and the town was noted for a number of lynchings and other racial violence in the late 19th century. Industrialization came to the community in the late 19th century, as a number of rivers cross the area providing locations for mills and factories. Economic and population growth would continue into and throughout the 20th century. As industry moved away from the community, it has in the 21st century transitioned into a bedroom community for the nearby cities of the Research Triangle region.

== History ==
=== Foundation and early years ===
Pittsboro was established as a town in 1785. The Chatham County Court House was built on land belonging to Mial Scurlock, but in 1787 the legislature declared that a town could not be established on Scurlock's land. The town's trustees instead purchased adjacent land belonging to William Petty and laid out the town. That same year, Pittsboro was officially named the county seat. Although Chatham County is named for William Pitt, 1st Earl of Chatham, Pittsboro is named for his son, William Pitt the Younger.

Pittsboro was once considered as a site for both the University of North Carolina and the state capital. The university was established in Chapel Hill, beginning in 1789. The state capital is Raleigh, 34 miles (55 km) east of Pittsboro.

As the county seat, Pittsboro has been a center of trade and local government, including the courts. Many farmers would come into town on the weekend for trade. In 1881 a new county courthouse and jail were built in Pittsboro.

=== Slavery and racial segregation ===
The area did not have large plantations, but farmers also depended on slave labor. In 1860 nearly one-third of the county population was made up of enslaved African Americans. After the Civil War and emancipation, whites used violence and other means to enforce white supremacy and suppress the freedmen's vote. The Ku Klux Klan and other supremacist groups were active in the county.

Pittsboro was the scene of a notorious mass lynching of four African Americans in 1885, including a woman. The event earned statewide condemnation. Those lynched were tenant farmers. A masked mob took Jerry Finch, his wife Harriet, and Lee Tyson from jail, where they were being held after arrest as suspects in a robbery/murder case. Harriet Finch was one of four black women to be lynched in the state. They also took and hanged John Pattishall, who was awaiting trial for two other unrelated robbery/murders.

A white mob broke into the Pittsboro jail and seized a 16-year-old boy, Eugene Daniel. He was lynched and then had his body riddled with bullets on September 18, 1921.

Violence continued during the stress of economic hard times at the end of the century and into the early 20th century, when the state disenfranchised most blacks. This political exclusion lasted until after 1965 and passage of the Voting Rights Act. In 2019, a statue erected in 1907 of a Confederate soldier outside the Chatham County Courthouse in Pittsboro was taken down.

=== Early industrialization ===
Textile mills in the north-central area of the county along the Haw River, Rocky River, and Deep River provided new manufacturing jobs to workers who had lost farm holdings due to economic depressions of the 1870s and early 1880s. It was the beginning of industrialization around Pittsboro.

=== Chatham County Courthouse fire ===
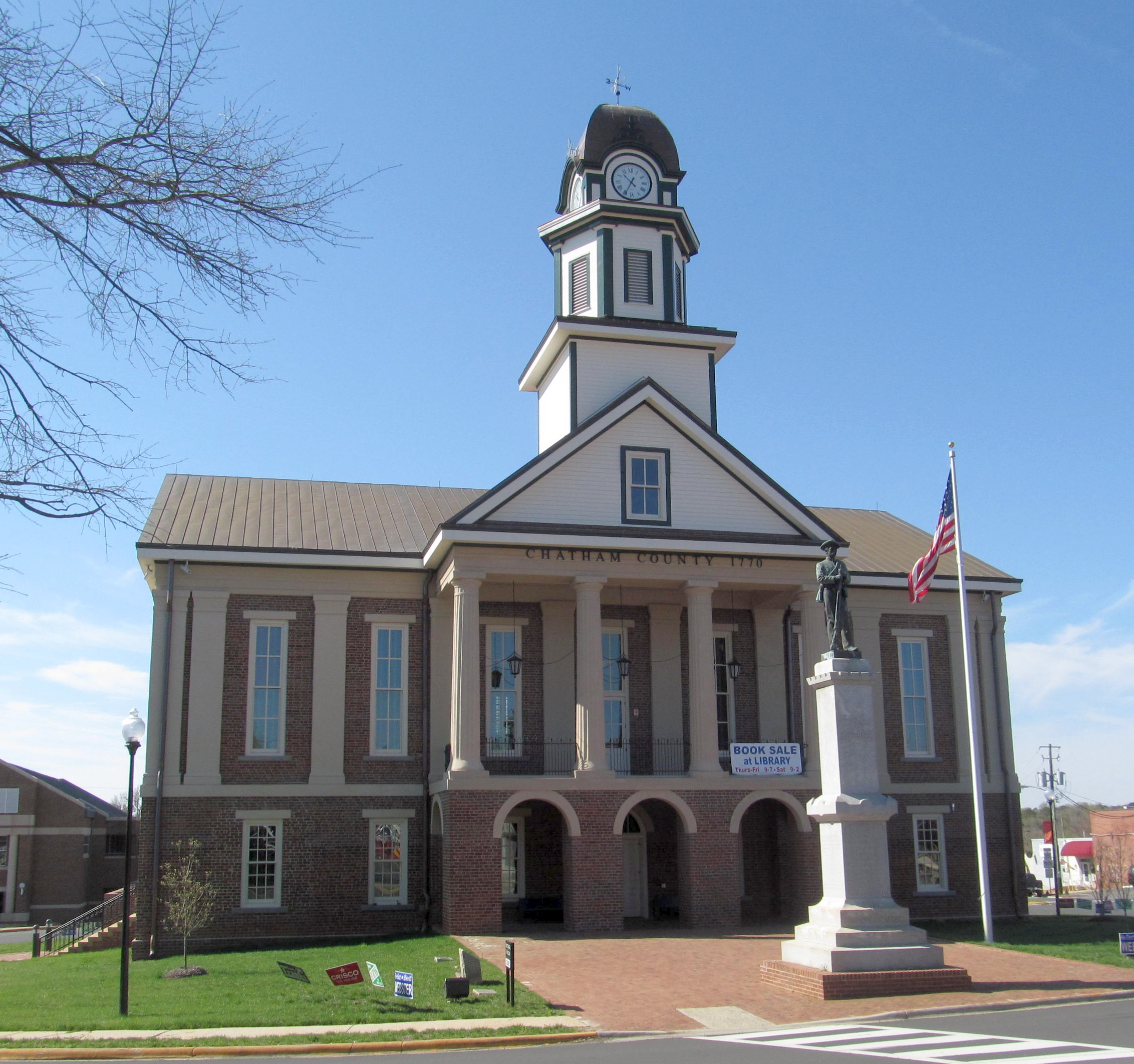
Chatham County Courthouse

On March 25, 2010, the Chatham County Courthouse, while undergoing a $415,000 exterior renovation, caught fire. Smoke was first reported in the area around 4:15 pm; the fire was dispatched to the Pittsboro Fire Department around 4:45 pm. By 5 pm, smoke was reported to be rising from out of the clock tower, which was surrounded by scaffolds. The building was evacuated safely.

The building suffered severe damage to the clock tower and the third floor. It was reported that the fire had destroyed all the computers and records, but there were offsite copies and the information was recoverable.

On March 26, 2010, at approximately 1:30 am, the clock tower collapsed onto the main building, but the building as a whole was damaged only on the second floor. Damage in the rest of the building was from water and smoke effects. Overall 11 fire departments participated in the fire efforts.

The fire marshal's investigation into the fire determined that it was caused by a soldering torch that ignited wood near the soffit. Workers attempted to extinguish the blaze, but were unsuccessful. On March 31, 2010, the Chatham County Commissioners voted to rebuild the courthouse. It reopened on April 20, 2013.

=== Chatham Park ===
Plans for the 7,100-acre Chatham Park development were announced in 2013. Opponents sued but lost their case in December 2016 and work began on a development expected to have 22,000 homes and 22 million square feet of office and retail space.

== City government ==
The mayor of Pittsboro is elected at-large. The current mayor is Kyle Shipp. The town's five members of the Board of Commissioners are also elected at-large. They are Pamela Baldwin, J.A. (Jay) Farrell, John Foley, John Bonitz, and James Vose. The Board of Commissioners hires a town manager to administer daily operations of the city; the current town manager is Jonathan Franklin.

Pittsboro holds elections for the Mayor and three seats on the Board of Commissioners every four years in the off-year after each midterm election. Two Pittsboro Commissioners are elected in the off-year after each presidential election.

Pittsboro Police is directed by Chief Shorty Johnson. Serving Pittsboro's 4,000 residents, the department comprises 8 patrolmen, 1 community police officer, 1 lead investigator and 1 lieutenant.

== Educational facilities ==
The town is served by five local schools and a Central Carolina Community College campus:

- Pittsboro Elementary School
- Horton Middle School
- Margaret B. Pollard Middle School
- Northwood High School
- Central Carolina Community College (CCCC), Chatham County Campus
- Seaforth High School

== Media outlets ==
Newspapers

- Chatham Journal

Network television

- WTVD (ABC affiliate)
- WRAL-TV (NBC affiliate)
- WRAZ (TV) (FOX affiliate)
- WNCN (CBS affiliate)

== Geography ==
Pittsboro is located east of the center of Chatham County. U.S. Highways 15 and 501 run concurrently through the center of the town as Hillsboro Street and Sanford Road, leading north 17 miles (27 km) to the center of Chapel Hill and the University of North Carolina, and south 17 miles (27 km) to Sanford. U.S. Route 64 bypasses Pittsboro to the north and leads east 34 miles (55 km) to Raleigh and west 16 miles (26 km) to Siler City. U.S. Route 64 Business passes through the town as West Street and East Street, crossing US 15/501 at the traffic circle that surrounds the historic Chatham County Courthouse in the center of town. North Carolina Highway 87 leads northwest from Pittsboro 32 miles (51 km) to Burlington.

Near the geographic center of the state, Pittsboro is 150 miles (240 km) from Wilmington at the coast and the same distance from Boone in the Blue Ridge Mountains.

Jordan Lake is 8 miles (13 km) east, providing recreation, fishing, boating and scenic panoramas. The lake is 14,000 acres (5,700 ha) of surface and provides water for Raleigh and the towns of Cary and Apex.

According to the United States Census Bureau, the town has a total area of 4.2 square miles (10.8 km^{2}), of which 4.1 square miles (10.7 km^{2}) is land and 0.04 square miles (0.1 km^{2}), or 0.86%, is water.

== Demographics ==
Historical population
Census	Pop.	Note	%±
1900	424		—
1910	502		18.4%
1920	584		16.3%
1930	675		15.6%
1940	826		22.4%
1950	1,094		32.4%
1960	1,215		11.1%
1970	1,447		19.1%
1980	1,332		−7.9%
1990	1,436		7.8%
2000	2,226		55.0%
2010	3,743		68.1%
2020	4,537		21.2%
2025 (est.)	5,054	▲	11.4%
U.S. Decennial Census

=== 2020 census ===
As of the 2020 census, Pittsboro had a population of 4,537. The median age was 43.1 years. 22.2% of residents were under the age of 18 and 22.6% of residents were 65 years of age or older. For every 100 females there were 78.4 males, and for every 100 females age 18 and over there were 71.5 males age 18 and over.

0.0% of residents lived in urban areas, while 100.0% lived in rural areas.

There were 1,791 households in Pittsboro, of which 33.8% had children under the age of 18 living in them. Of all households, 44.8% were married-couple households, 12.6% were households with a male householder and no spouse or partner present, and 38.5% were households with a female householder and no spouse or partner present. About 31.9% of all households were made up of individuals and 17.2% had someone living alone who was 65 years of age or older. There were 1,044 families residing in the town.

There were 1,901 housing units, of which 5.8% were vacant. The homeowner vacancy rate was 1.3% and the rental vacancy rate was 4.3%.

Pittsboro racial composition
Race	Number	Percentage
White (non-Hispanic)	2,946	64.93%
Black or African American (non-Hispanic)	798	17.59%
Native American	6	0.13%
Asian	77	1.7%
Pacific Islander	1	0.02%
Other/Mixed	224	4.94%
Hispanic or Latino	485	10.69%

=== 2010 Census ===
The Census of 2010 shows a population of 3,743, 68% growth since 2000. The racial makeup of the town was: 72% White, 19% African American, 4% some other race alone, 2% two or more races. Almost 9% of the population was Hispanic or Latino. 54% of the population is female and 46% male.

=== 2000 Census ===
As of the census of 2000, there were 2,226 people, 855 households, and 535 families residing in the town. The population density was 663.1 inhabitants per square mile (256.0/km^{2}). There were 939 housing units at an average density of 279.7 per square mile (108.0/km^{2}). The racial makeup of the town was 64.38 percent White, 27.54 percent African American, 0.49 percent Native American, 0.67 percent Asian, 0.04 percent Pacific Islander, 4.99 percent from other races, and 1.89 percent from two or more races. Hispanic or Latino of any race were 8.81 percent of the population.

There were 855 households, out of which 29.0 percent had children under the age of 18 living with them, 40.9 percent were married couples living together, 18.7 percent had a female householder with no husband present, and 37.4 percent were non-families. 32.3 percent of all households were made up of individuals, and 12.7 percent had someone living alone who was 65 years of age or older. The average household size was 2.34 and the average family size was 2.97.

In the town, the population was spread out, with 22.9% under the age of 18, 7.3 percent from 18 to 24, 28.7 percent from 25 to 44, 19.6 percent from 45 to 64, and 21.5 percent who were 65 years of age or older. The median age was 39 years. For every 100 females, there were 80.7 males. For every 100 females age 18 and over, there were 75.0 males.

The median income for a household in the town was $35,800, and the median income for a family was $42,391. Males had a median income of $29,500 versus $26,719 for females. The per capita income for the town was $16,863. About 19.2 percent of families and 18.3 percent of the population were below the poverty line, including 24.3 percent of those under age 18 and 13.7 percent of those age 65 or over.

== Economy ==
Once home to textiles, the largest clothing label mill in the world, and poultry, the town now depends on commuter income, retail stores and a developing business in genetics. Housing developments are intended to provide relief from loss of industry as the town adapts to a different economy.

The water supply is abundant, derived from the Haw River. In the future, Jordan Lake will provide much of the water supply. In 2010, the wastewater allotment was expanded. The town is 15 miles (24 km) and 25 miles (40 km) from major power plants. Major corridor highways, US 15-501 and US 64, a four-lane divided highway, intersect there.

Pittsboro is home to the Chatham County Government, the Chatham County Justice Center, and many non-profit agencies and other social service organizations. Pittsboro is also a Certified Retirement Community.

== National Register of Historic Places listings ==
- A. P. Terry House
- Alston-DeGraffenried House
- Aspen Hall
- Baldwin's Mill
- Chatham County Courthouse
- Hadley House and Grist Mill
- Hall-London House
- Luther Clegg House
- Henry Adolphus London House
- James A. Thomas Farm
- Lewis Freeman House
- London Cottage
- Kelvin
- McClenahan House
- Moore-Manning House
- Patrick St. Lawrence House
- Pittsboro Historic District
- Pittsboro Masonic Lodge
- Pittsboro Presbyterian Church
- Reid House
- Sheriff Stephen Wiley Brewer Farmstead

== Notable people ==
- David Drake (1945–2023), science fiction and fantasy writer
- William Joseph Franks (1830–1880), sailor in the Union Navy who received the Medal of Honor for his actions in the American Civil War
- Anne Taylor Nash (1884–1968), painter
- Tobais Palmer (born 1990), football wide receiver
- Drake Powell (born 2005), professional basketball player
- Abraham Rencher (1798–1883), governor of New Mexico Territory and congressman
- Charles M. Stedman (1841–1930), the last Civil War veteran to serve in Congress
- Nathan Alexander Stedman (1762–1847), politician, Comptroller of North Carolina
- Ursula Vernon (born 1977), children's author and artist
- James Iredell Waddell (1824–1886), officer in the United States Navy and later in the Confederate States Navy

== Miscellaneous ==
A new community called Asteria is being developed by Storyliving by Disney in Pittsboro.

== See also ==
- Carolina Brewery
