= Pittsboro Presbyterian Church =

Historic church in North Carolina, United States

- U.S. National Register of Historic Places
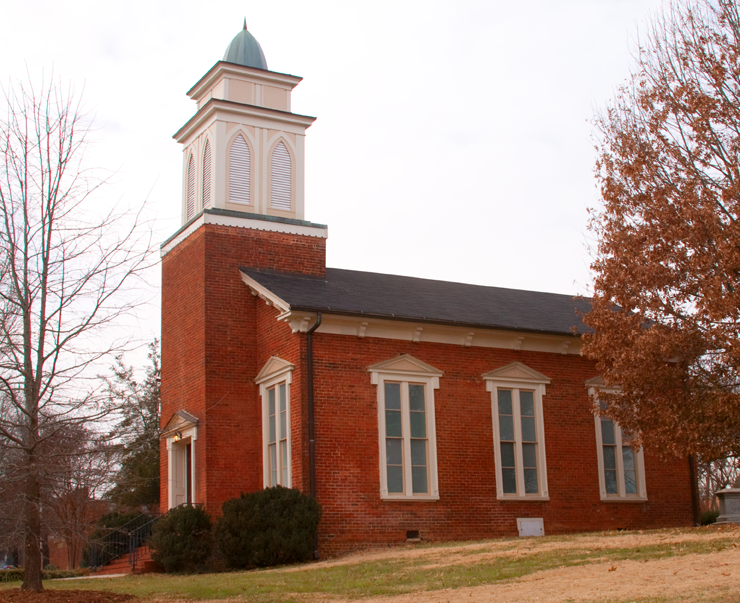
- View from the west

- Location within North Carolina Location within the United States
- Location: N. East St., Pittsboro, North Carolina
- Coordinates: 35°43′13″N 79°10′34″W
- Area: less than one acre
- Built: c. 1850
- NRHP reference No.: 78001939
- Added to NRHP: January 30, 1978

Pittsboro Presbyterian Church is a historic Presbyterian church located on N. East Street in Pittsboro, Chatham County, North Carolina. It was built about 1850, and is a one-story brick church. The tower and steeple were replaced in 1875 following a tornado, and again in the 1920s and in 1971.

It was listed on the National Register of Historic Places in 1978.
