= James A. Thomas Farm =

Historic house in North Carolina, United States

- U.S. National Register of Historic Places
- Location within North Carolina Location within the United States
- Location: SR 1941, near Pittsboro, North Carolina
- Coordinates: 35°42′21″N 79°04′43″W
- Area: 43 acres (17 ha)
- Built: c. 1860-1870
- Architectural style: Greek Revival
- MPS: Chatham County MRA
- NRHP reference No.: 85001460
- Added to NRHP: July 5, 1985

James A. Thomas Farm is a historic home and farm located near Pittsboro, Chatham County, North Carolina. The house consist of a one-story frame cabin, perhaps constructed during the late 1860s or early 1870s, with a rear shed and a two-story, vernacular Greek Revival style wing added in the early 1880s. Also on the property are several contributing log, weatherboard and board-and-batten outbuildings.

It was listed on the National Register of Historic Places in 1985.
