= Hall-London House =

Historic house in North Carolina, United States

- U.S. National Register of Historic Places
- U.S. Historic district – Contributing property
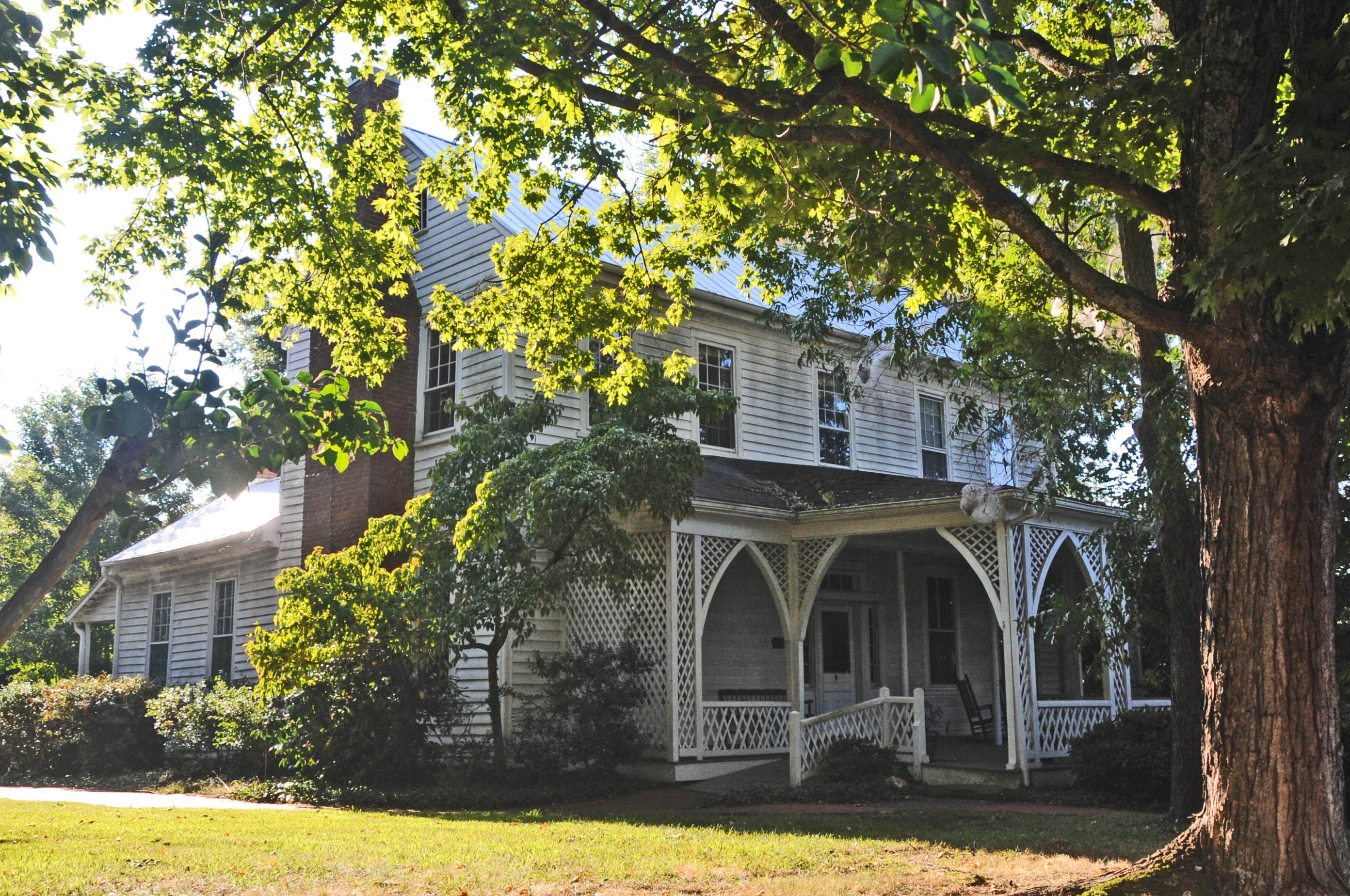
- Hall-London House, March 2007

- Location within North Carolina Location within the United States
- Location: 128 Hillsboro St., Pittsboro, North Carolina
- Coordinates: 35°43′19″N 79°10′37″W
- Area: 0.5 acres (0.20 ha)
- Built: c. 1836
- Architectural style: Greek Revival, Federal, Gothic Revival
- MPS: Pittsboro MRA
- NRHP reference No.: 82001285
- Added to NRHP: October 5, 1982

Hall-London House is a historic home located in Pittsboro, Chatham County, North Carolina. It was built in about 1836, is a tall two-story, five bay Federal / Greek Revival style frame dwelling. It features a broad Gothic Revival style front porch. A two-story rear ell was added about 1900.

It was listed on the National Register of Historic Places in 1982. It is located in the Pittsboro Historic District.

It has been occupied by Bradshaw & Robinson, LLP, a local law firm, since 2000, and its predecessor law firms going back to 1984.
