= London Cottage =

Historic house in North Carolina, United States

- U.S. National Register of Historic Places
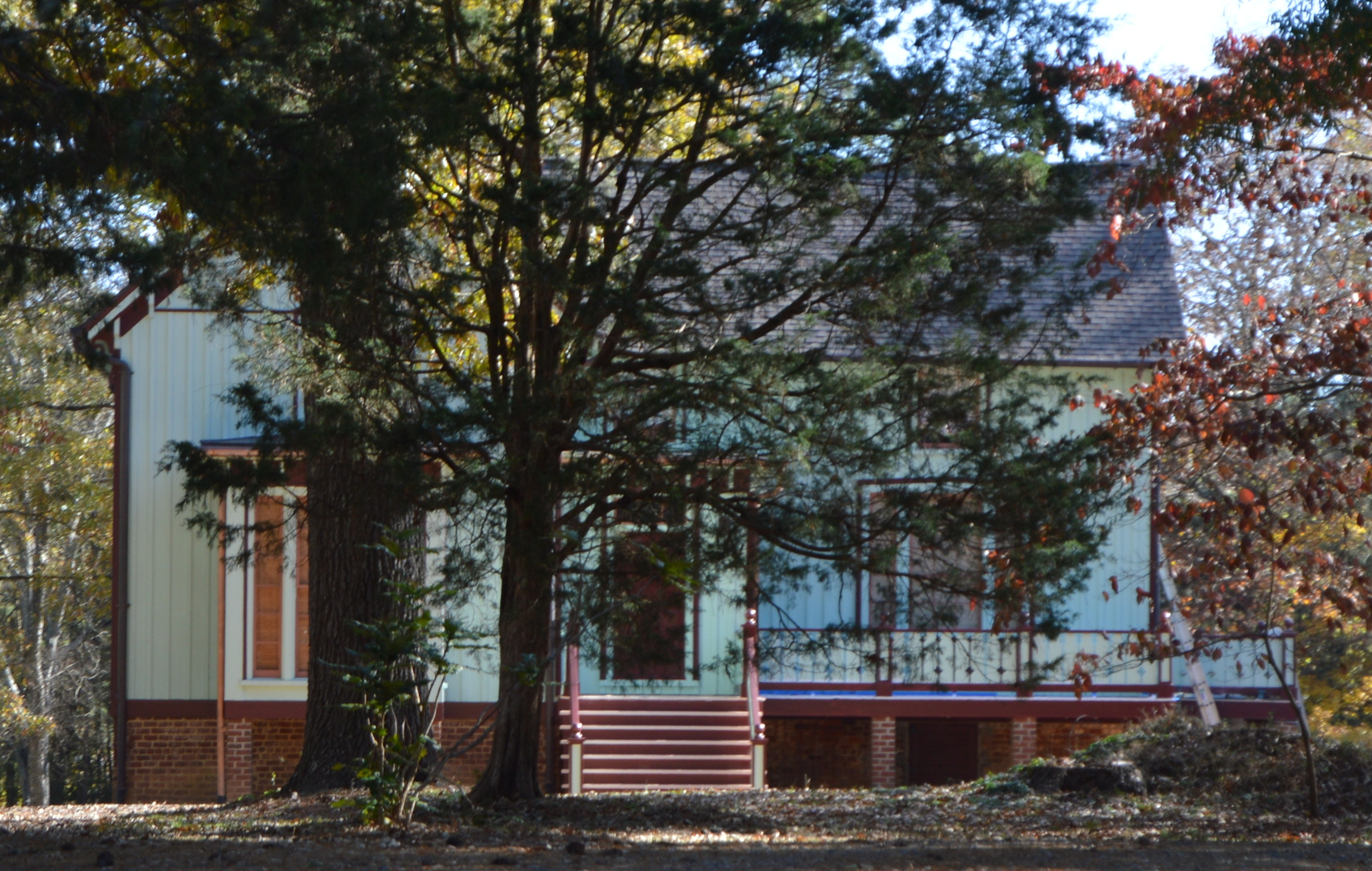
- Front of the house

- Location within North Carolina Location within the United States
- Location: SR 1516 north of Pittsboro, North Carolina
- Coordinates: 35°43′36″N 79°11′13″W
- Area: 1 acre (0.40 ha)
- Built: c. 1861
- Architectural style: Late Gothic Revival
- MPS: Pittsboro MRA
- NRHP reference No.: 82001287
- Added to NRHP: October 5, 1982

London Cottage is a historic home located near Pittsboro, Chatham County, North Carolina. It was built about 1861. It is a 1 1/2-story, three bay Late Gothic Revival style frame dwelling. The house has a projecting cross-gable wing and a one-story rear ell. It sits on a brick basement, is sheathed with board and batten siding, and has an overhanging gable roof with decorative brackets.

It was listed on the National Register of Historic Places in 1982.
