= Hadley House and Grist Mill =

Historic buildings in North Carolina, United States

- U.S. National Register of Historic Places
- Location within North Carolina Location within the United States
- Location: Northwest of Pittsboro on SR 2165, Pittsboro, North Carolina
- Coordinates: 35°42′32″N 79°18′02″W
- Area: 46.2 acres (18.7 ha)
- Built: c. 1858, 1885
- Architectural style: Greek Revival
- NRHP reference No.: 80002807
- Added to NRHP: November 25, 1980

Hadley House and Grist Mill is a historic home and grist mill located near Pittsboro, Chatham County, North Carolina. The house was built about 1858, and is a two-story, three bay by two bay, Greek Revival style frame dwelling. It has a one-story rear ell and one-bay front porch, and sits on a stone foundation. The mill dates to 1885, and is a three-story frame structure on a stone foundation. It has an exterior iron mill wheel measuring 16 feet in diameter. The mill continued in operation until the 1930s. Also on the property are the contributing two-story frame smokehouse, foundation stones for the original detached kitchen and quarters, and archaeological remains.

It was listed on the National Register of Historic Places in 1980.
