= Luther Clegg House =

Historic house in North Carolina, United States

- U.S. National Register of Historic Places
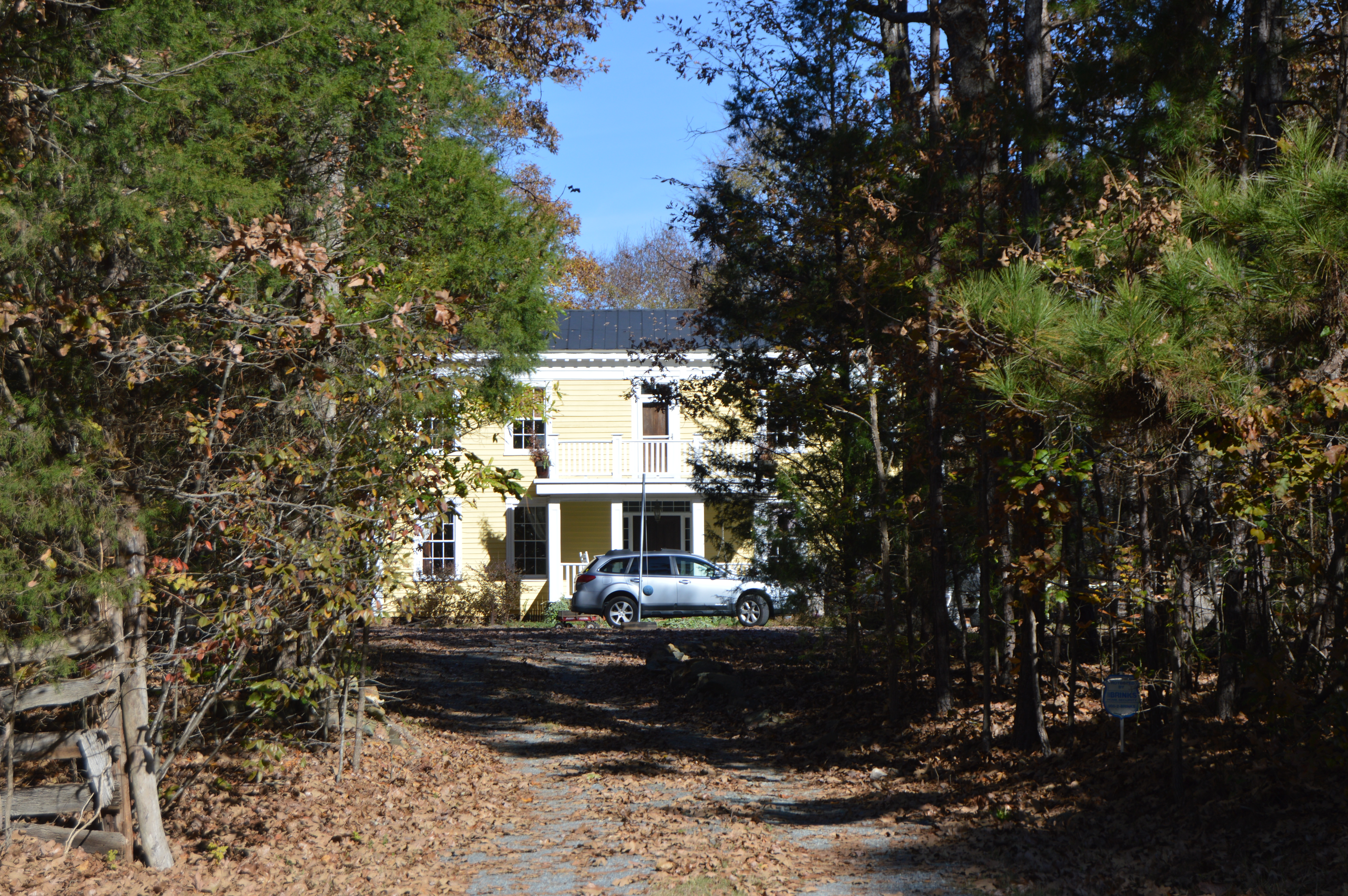
- Driveway view

- Location within North Carolina Location within the United States
- Location: SR 1012 south of Pittsboro, North Carolina
- Coordinates: 35°41′54″N 79°9′49″W
- Area: 7.5 acres (3.0 ha)
- Built: c. 1850
- Architectural style: Greek Revival
- MPS: Pittsboro MRA
- NRHP reference No.: 82001283
- Added to NRHP: October 5, 1982

Luther Clegg House is a historic home located near Pittsboro, Chatham County, North Carolina. It was built about 1850, and is a two-story, five bay Greek Revival style single-pile frame dwelling. It has a low hipped roof and flanking exterior end chimneys.

It was listed on the National Register of Historic Places in 1982.

The house was occupied by the descendants of Luther Clegg until it was sold in 2002. Besides the house, the remaining buildings, at the time of sale, were the carriage house with stables, original well which had been enclosed in the late seventies for safety reasons, the old kitchen with attached pantry, two storage buildings, an ice house, and a chicken house with the outhouse attached to the back. The ruins of the small family vineyard were also on property. The barn for the property was located across the street from the house however it had been destroyed by a large oak tree falling on it after a storm. The house originally sat among a number of oak trees, however, on September 6, 1996, Hurricane Fran passed over the property and pulled three very ancient oak trees and multiple younger oak trees up by their roots. Hurricane Fran also brought down one black walnut tree and took the top off an old pine tree. In total 36 trees were lost on the 7-acre property. Only the uppermost canopy of two trees hit the house and did not a cause single bit of damage. None of the buildings were damaged by the storm.
