= Nathan Alexander Stedman =

Comptroller of the State of North Carolina

Nathan Alexander Stedman III (July 11, 1762 – November 13, 1847) was an American politician, who served as member of the North Carolina House of Commons (1810), the North Carolina General Assembly (1827-1828), the North Carolina Senate (1832-1834) and was Comptroller of the State of North Carolina in 1835. He also served several years as the Clerk of Courts for the Chatham County Court of Pleas and Quarter Sessions.

== Early life and career ==
He was born 11 Jul 1762 in Ashford, Connecticut, at that time a British Colony. He was the son of Nathan Alexander Stedman II and Prudence Hurlbut. When he was a teenager, he volunteered for the Continental Army and served as a private for three months. He then became a privateer aboard the Bunker Hill and the Benjamin Sampson, plundering British warships in support of the American Revolution. He was captured and taken to Bermuda, where he spent the remainder of the war until he was released in a prisoner exchange. His subsequent request for a pension was rejected because he hadn't served long enough in the army, and privateer service did not qualify under the existing law.

After his prison release, he moved to North Carolina with his brothers Winship and Elisha and settled in the Chatham County area. He became a prominent citizen of the county, establishing the Nathan Stedman Company no later than 1786. In fairly short order, he became a wealthy landowner, purchasing numerous pieces of property in Chatham County and Pittsboro. In January 1787 he was appointed by the North Carolina General Assembly as one of the Commissioners to purchase land and lay out the plat for the town of Pittsborough. In 1790, he, along with a number of others, was selected by the North Carolina legislature to form the Fayetteville Canal Company to make Cross Creek navigable and improve commerce in the area.

Stedman was a member of the Whig Party of North Carolina. In 1810, he was elected to the North Carolina General Assembly representing Chatham County. He served again in 1827 and served in the Senate in 1832-33. In 1834 he became Comptroller of the State, a position he held for one year. From 1837 until his death in 1847, he served as Clerk of the Court for the Chatham County Court of Pleas and Quarter Sessions. During the same time that he served as Clerk of the Court, he also served as Clerk as well as Member of the Board of Superintendents for Common Schools, established by the North Carolina General Assembly in 1840.

He died on November 13, 1847, in Pittsboro, North Carolina. A large number of his descendants carry his name, leaving a legacy that stretches to modern times.

== Cemetery controversy ==
In 1833, as executor of his father, Winship Stedman's estate, Winship's son, Nathan A. Stedman, sold a property in Pittsboro to the infant heir of Daniel McLeod, completing a transaction his father had begun a year before his death. The deed specifically exempted a 25 x 25 foot square in the southwest corner of the northern half of the property, including ingress and egress rights. That square is believed to be the family cemetery where Nathan Alexander Stedman, his wife, his brother, Winship and his wife, his parents, and other relatives are buried. The title chain for the property shows that the exemption was carried forward through each transaction, until 1939, when the restriction mysteriously disappeared. The suspected site of the cemetery is now supposedly covered with asphalt and contains a dumpster.

The cemetery was excavated by professional archeologists in April 2022. Artifacts and human remains were recovered, cataloged, and reinterred in the Pittsboro United Methodist Church Cemetery. A dedication ceremony will take place in November 2022 when the National Association of Sons of the American Revolution, Sandhills Chapter will dedicate a plaque in his name at the cemetery.
