= Pittsboro Historic District =

Historic district in North Carolina, United States

- U.S. National Register of Historic Places
- U.S. Historic district
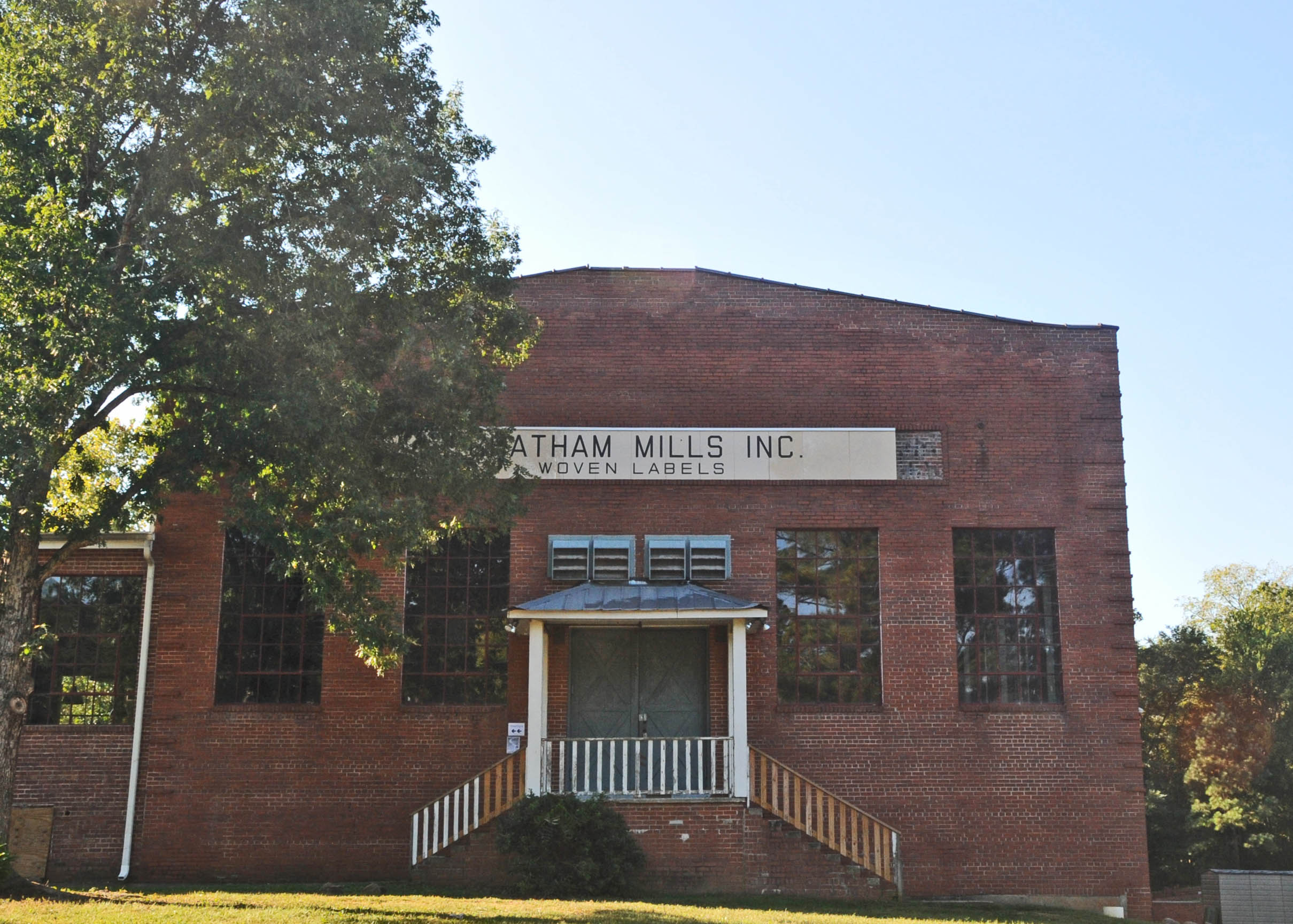
- Pittsboro Historic District, March 2007

- Location within North Carolina Location within the United States
- Location: Roughly bounded by Chatham St., Small St., Rectory St., and Launis St., Pittsboro, North Carolina
- Coordinates: 35°43′21″N 79°10′36″W
- Area: 59 acres (24 ha)
- Built: 1787
- Architect: Hanks, Martin; et.al.
- Architectural style: Early Commercial, Queen Anne, et.al.
- MPS: Pittsboro MRA
- NRHP reference No.: 00000442
- Added to NRHP: May 5, 2000

Pittsboro Historic District is a national historic district located at Pittsboro, Chatham County, North Carolina. The district encompasses 131 contributing buildings, three contributing sites, and one contributing object in the county seat of Pittsboro. Located in the district and separately listed are the Chatham County Courthouse, the Hall-London House, the Moore-Manning House, the Reid House, the Lewis Freeman House, the McClenahan House, and the Patrick St. Lawrence House. Other notable buildings include the Blair Hotel, Pilkington Drug Store / S & T' s Soda Shoppe, Justice Motor Company building (1949), St. Bartholomew's Episcopal Church (1832), Pittsboro United Methodist Church (c. 1836), and Queen Anne style Henry H. Fike House (c. 1895).

It was listed on the National Register of Historic Places in 2000.
