= Sheriff Stephen Wiley Brewer Farmstead =

Historic house in North Carolina, United States

- U.S. National Register of Historic Places
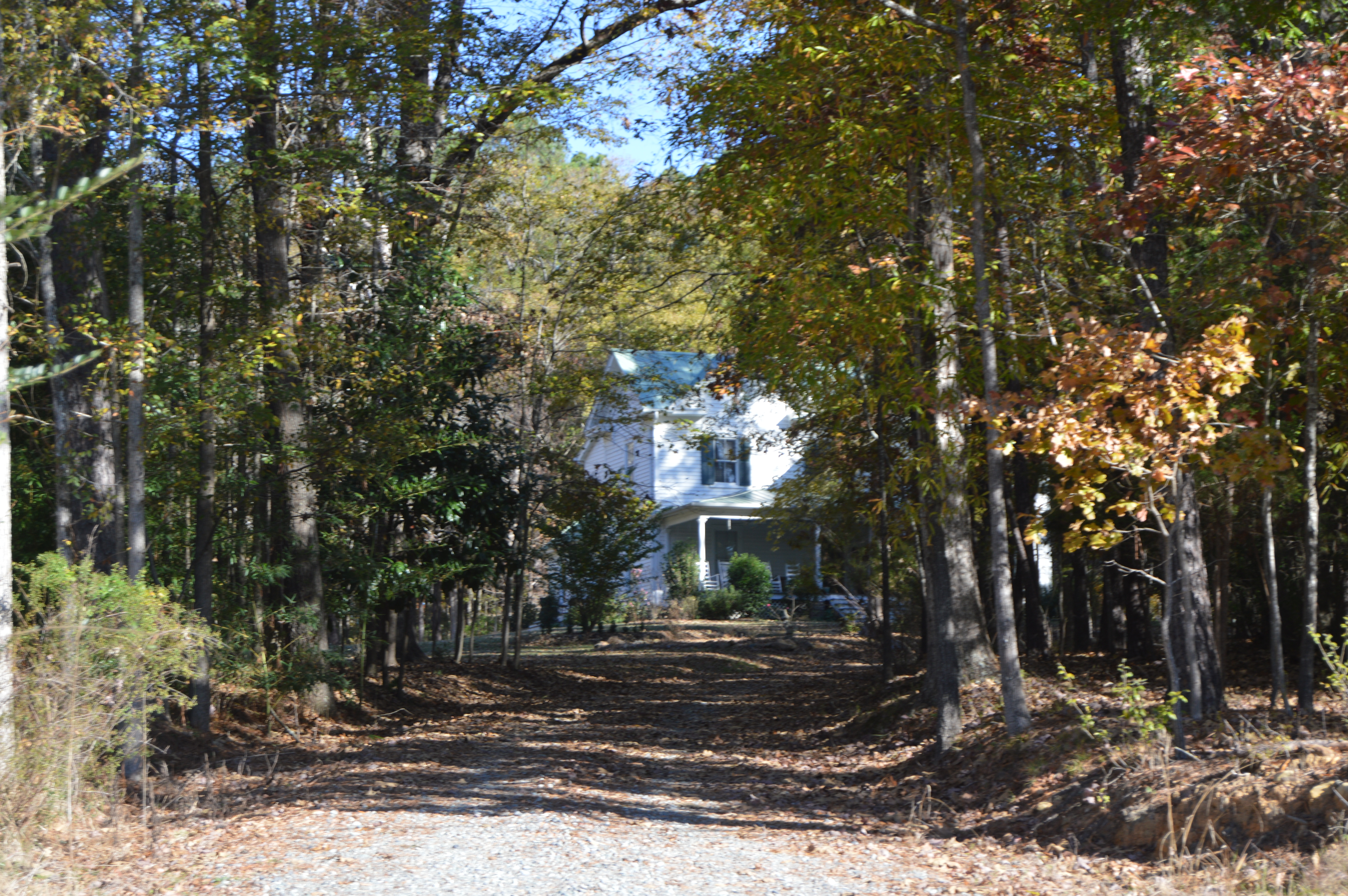
- Driveway view

- Location within North Carolina Location within the United States
- Location: 365 Thompson St., Pittsboro, North Carolina
- Coordinates: 35°43′27″N 79°10′15″W
- Area: 25.1 acres (10.2 ha)
- Built: c. 1887; 139 years ago
- Built by: Bennett Nooe, Thomas Hackney
- Architectural style: Queen Anne, Italianate
- MPS: Pittsboro MRA
- NRHP reference No.: 03000801
- Added to NRHP: August 21, 2003

Sheriff Stephen Wiley Brewer Farmstead, also known as the Regan Property, is a historic home and farm located at Pittsboro, Chatham County, North Carolina. The main house was built about 1887, and is a two-story Italianate / Queen Anne style gable-and-wing frame dwelling. It features a gabled wing with one-story bay window and a one-story porch across the main block. Also on the property are the contributing original granary and smokehouse.

It was listed on the National Register of Historic Places in 2003.
