= Alston-DeGraffenried Plantation =

Historic house in North Carolina, United States

- U.S. National Register of Historic Places
- U.S. Historic district
- Location within North Carolina Location within the United States
- Location: West of Pittsboro off U.S. 64; also the northern side of U.S. Route 64, 0.4 miles (0.64 km) west of its junction with NC 1564, near Pittsboro, North Carolina
- Coordinates: 35°43′59″N 79°14′36″W
- Built: ca. 1810-1825
- Architect: Broome, Meleus
- Architectural style: Georgian, Federal, Federal vernacular
- NRHP reference No.: 93001132 (original); 74001339 (increase)

Significant dates
- Added to NRHP: November 18, 1974 (original)
- Boundary increase: October 21, 1993 (boundaries increased)

Alston-DeGraffenried Plantation or Alston-DeGraffenried House is a historic property located in Chatham County, North Carolina, near Pittsboro, North Carolina. It includes a plantation house built through the forced labor of at least 11 enslaved people between about 1810 and 1825, and its surrounding agricultural fields. The property was first listed on the National Register of Historic Places in 1974 and the listed area was increased in 1993. The house and the surrounding land are identified as a national historic district.

The district encompasses seven contributing buildings, two contributing sites, and one contributing structure. They include the main house, kitchen, pig boiling pit, four-seat privy, smokehouse, two-seat privy, corn crib, small barn, well shelter, and the surrounding landscape. The main house is a two-story, five-bay, Georgian/ Federal style dwelling. It sits on a raised brick basement and has a tall hipped roof. It has a full-width Victorian porch and a number of one-story rear additions.

The house was built for Delia Alston by her father, Joseph John "Chatham Jack" Alston, at the time of Delia's marriage to John Baker DeGraffenried. It was one of six homes that Alston, one of the largest landowners and enslavers in the area, built for his children. He also built nearby Aspen Hall.
