= Moore-Manning House =

Historic house in North Carolina, United States

- U.S. National Register of Historic Places
- U.S. Historic district – Contributing property
- Location within North Carolina Location within the United States
- Location: 400 Hillsboro St., Pittsboro, North Carolina
- Coordinates: 35°43′32″N 79°10′35″W
- Area: 2.6 acres (1.1 ha)
- Built: c. 1835
- Architectural style: Federal
- MPS: Pittsboro MRA
- NRHP reference No.: 82001289
- Added to NRHP: October 5, 1982

Moore-Manning House is a historic home located at Pittsboro, Chatham County, North Carolina. It was built in the 1830s, and is a two-story, three-bay, Federal style frame dwelling with a hipped roof. The house was renovated in 1858 and a two-story wing added.

It was listed on the National Register of Historic Places in 1982. It is located in the Pittsboro Historic District.
