= Chatham County Courthouse =

Historic courthouse in North Carolina, US

- U.S. National Register of Historic Places
- U.S. Historic district – Contributing property
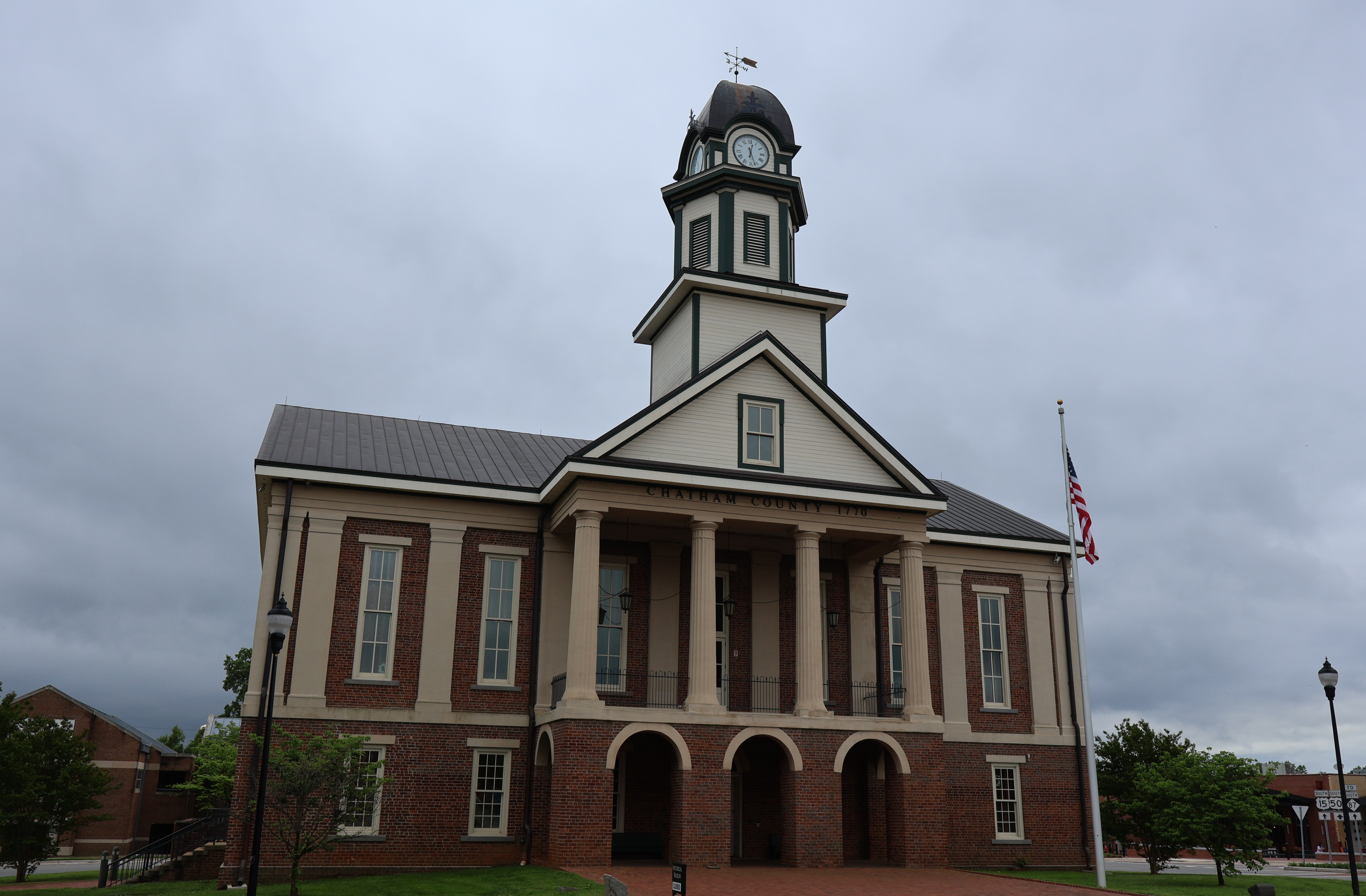
- Chatham County Courthouse, April 2023

- Location within North Carolina Location within the United States
- Interactive map showing the location of Chatham County Courthouse
- Location: NC 15-501 and Highway 64, Pittsboro, North Carolina
- Coordinates: 35°43′13″N 79°10′38″W
- Built: 1881
- Architectural style: Late Victorian
- MPS: North Carolina County Courthouses TR
- NRHP reference No.: 79001691
- Added to NRHP: May 10, 1979

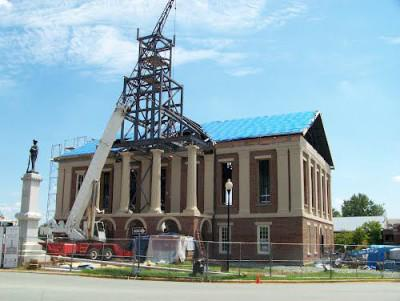
Chatham County Courthouse during its reconstruction in 2012

The Chatham County Courthouse is a historic courthouse located at Pittsboro, Chatham County, North Carolina. It sits at the center of town in the middle of a traffic circle. It was built in 1881 for $10,666 and is a two-story rectangular brick structure in the Late Victorian style. It features a two-story classical portico crowned with a distinctive three-stage cupola. A one-story addition was built in the 1930s by the Works Progress Administration. In 1959, extensive renovations were performed on the building.

It was listed on the National Register of Historic Places in 1979. It is located in the Pittsboro Historic District.

A fire on March 24, 2010, did great damage to the building which was in the midst of another renovation. The restored building reopened April 20, 2013 with an exhibit covering Chatham County history on the first floor and a courtroom on the second.

In 1907, the county gave a license to the United Daughters of the Confederacy to place a statue of a Confederate soldier outside the courthouse. In 2019, the Chatham County Board of Commissioners voted to rescind this license, and the statue was removed as part of the trend toward removal of Confederate monuments and memorials in the 2010s.
