= Pittsboro Masonic Lodge =

- U.S. National Register of Historic Places
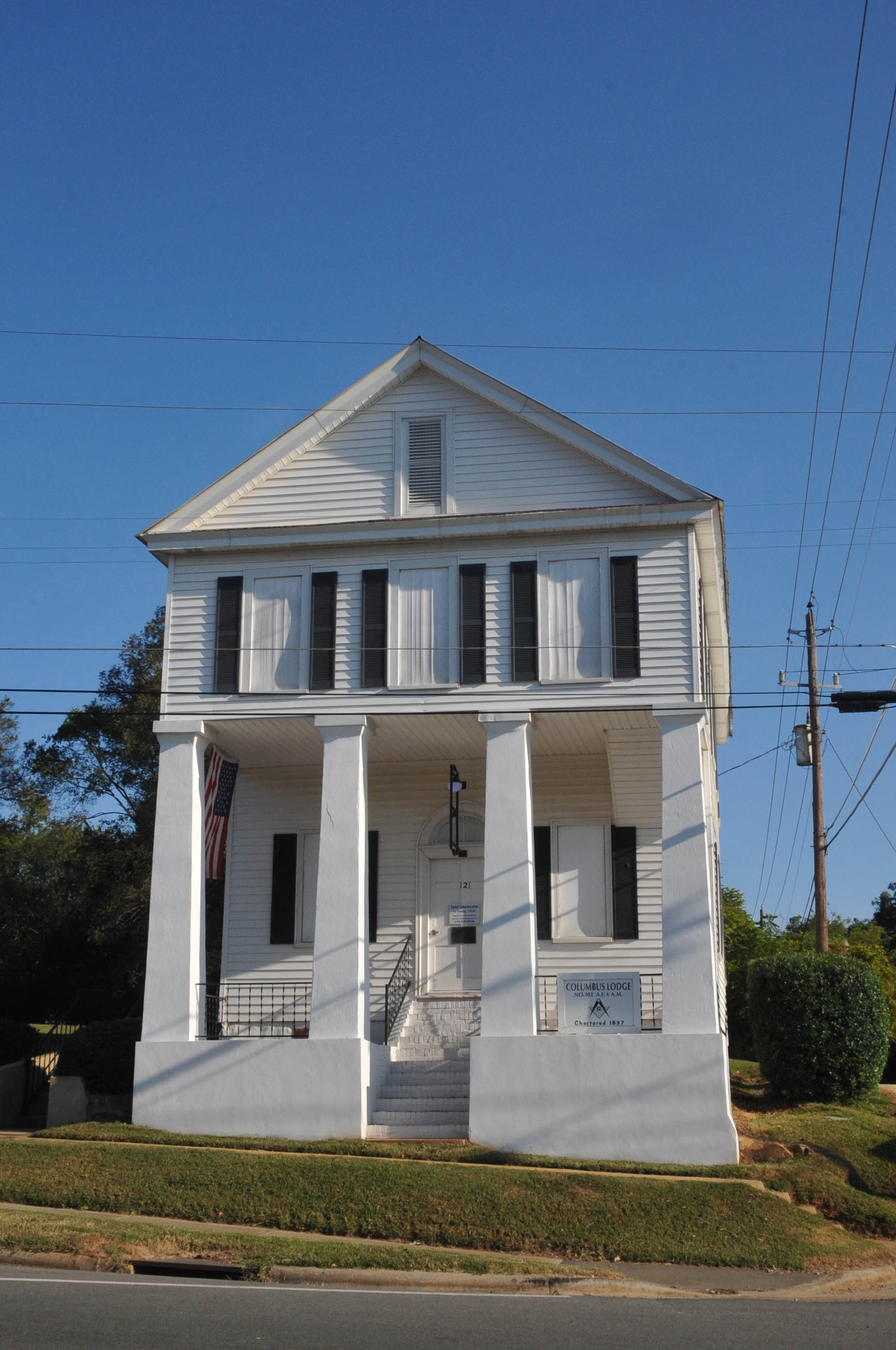
- Pittsboro Masonic Lodge, March 2007

- Location within North Carolina Location within the United States
- Location: East and Masonic Sts., Pittsboro, North Carolina
- Coordinates: 35°43′13″N 79°10′32″W
- Area: less than one acre
- Built: 1838
- Built by: Hanks, Martin
- Architectural style: Greek Revival
- NRHP reference No.: 78001938
- Added to NRHP: January 31, 1978

Pittsboro Masonic Lodge, also known as Columbus Lodge No. 102, is a historic Masonic Lodge located at Pittsboro, Chatham County, North Carolina. It was built in 1838, and is a two-story, Greek Revival style frame building. In 1846, it was enlarged by the addition of the distinctive pedimented second-story overhang carried on heavy square pillars. It is one of the oldest still-functioning Masonic halls in North Carolina.

It was listed on the National Register of Historic Places in 1978.
