= Lewis Freeman House =

Historic house in North Carolina, United States

- U.S. National Register of Historic Places
- U.S. Historic district – Contributing property
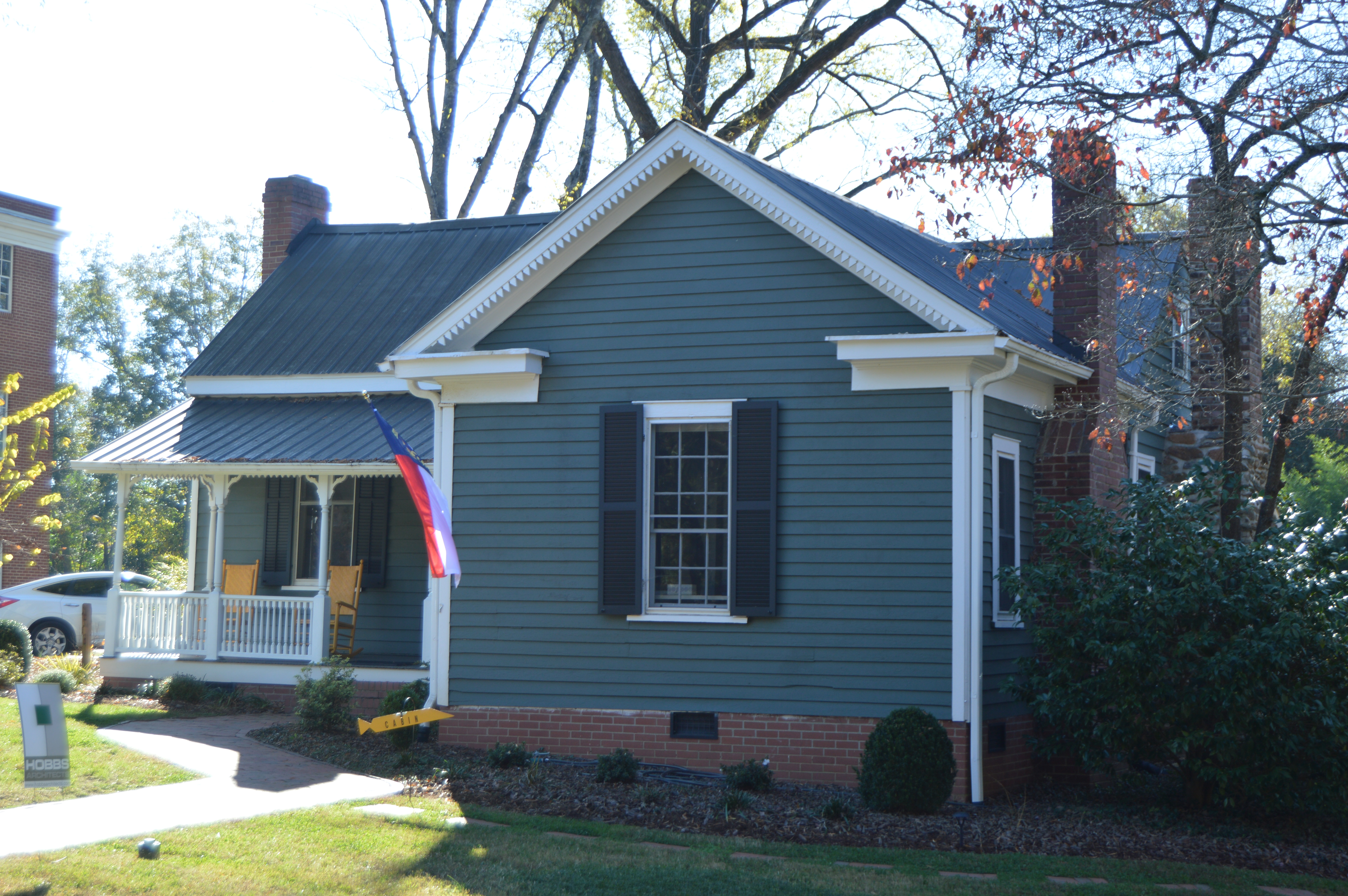
- Front and western side

- Location within North Carolina Location within the United States
- Location: 205 W. Salisbury St., Pittsboro, North Carolina
- Coordinates: 35°43′17″N 79°10′49″W
- Area: 0.5 acres (0.20 ha)
- Built: c. 1811-1837, c. 1890
- Architectural style: Queen Anne
- MPS: Pittsboro MRA
- NRHP reference No.: 82001284
- Added to NRHP: October 5, 1982

Lewis Freeman House is a historic home located at Pittsboro, Chatham County, North Carolina. The original section was built between about 1811 and 1837, and expanded through the 1890s. It is a one-story, three bay frame cottage with Queen Anne style design elements. The original one-room structure represents the modest home of Lewis Freeman, a free black settler in Pittsboro. The home is one of four remaining dwellings from the town's initial settlement. Due to the lack of records during the early 1800s, little is known about the first residents of the area.

It was listed on the National Register of Historic Places in 1982. It is located in the Pittsboro Historic District.

== Historical background ==
The Lewis Freeman House was built sometime between 1811, when Lewis Freeman began to buy town property, and 1837, when it was first recorded that he lived there. The single-room house was home to Pittsboro's first recorded and most successful black settler. The town records support the evidence that free black people played a large role during early development of North Carolina towns. Prior to the Emancipation Proclamation of 1863, manumission was a somewhat practice that allowed freed black people definite rights—including land ownership, transfer, and descent of property. While his trade remains unknown, Lewis Freeman established himself by investing in real estate.

By 1811, it is known through tax records that Freeman owned four town lots and had acquired two more by 1815. The 1815 tax record also mentions that one of these six lots was improved in some way. The original sixteen by sixteen foot Lewis Freeman House is thought to have been this improvement.

In 1830, the federal census described Lewis Freeman as a free black man between fifty and sixty years old who lived with his wife, Creecy Freeman, and two children. By 1837, the four acre block on West Salisbury Street was recorded as "the Lot on which said Lewis Freeman now lives & embracing the whole square with the exception of the Tanyard Lot."

Lewis Freeman died in 1843; leaving to his wife the home, sixteen town lots, twenty acres of land, a cow, a horse, and all household furniture. Creecy Freeman died shortly after and under the provisions of Lewis Freeman's will, the property was left to an unrelated white man named John Thompson. Thompson was the legal executor of Freeman's will, leaving room for speculation as to why the property did not go to Lewis and Creecy Freeman's surviving son, Waller Freeman.

For years afterwards the Lewis Freeman House exchanged hands frequently and many additions and changes were made. In 1980 the house was purchased by Jane Pyle who operated a small printing company there.
