= Terry Hall =

Terry Hall may refer to:

- Terry Hall (basketball) (1944–1997), American women's college basketball coach
- Terry Hall (singer) (1959–2022), English singer
- Terry Hall (ventriloquist) (1926–2007), English ventriloquist who worked with his puppet, Lenny the Lion
- Terry and Lander Halls, two connected residential towers on the south campus of the University of Washington
- Terry Hall (policeman) (1945–2016), Canadian policeman

== See also ==
- Terry House (disambiguation)
