= William L. Terry House =

Historic house in Arkansas, United States

- U.S. National Register of Historic Places
- U.S. Historic district – Contributing property
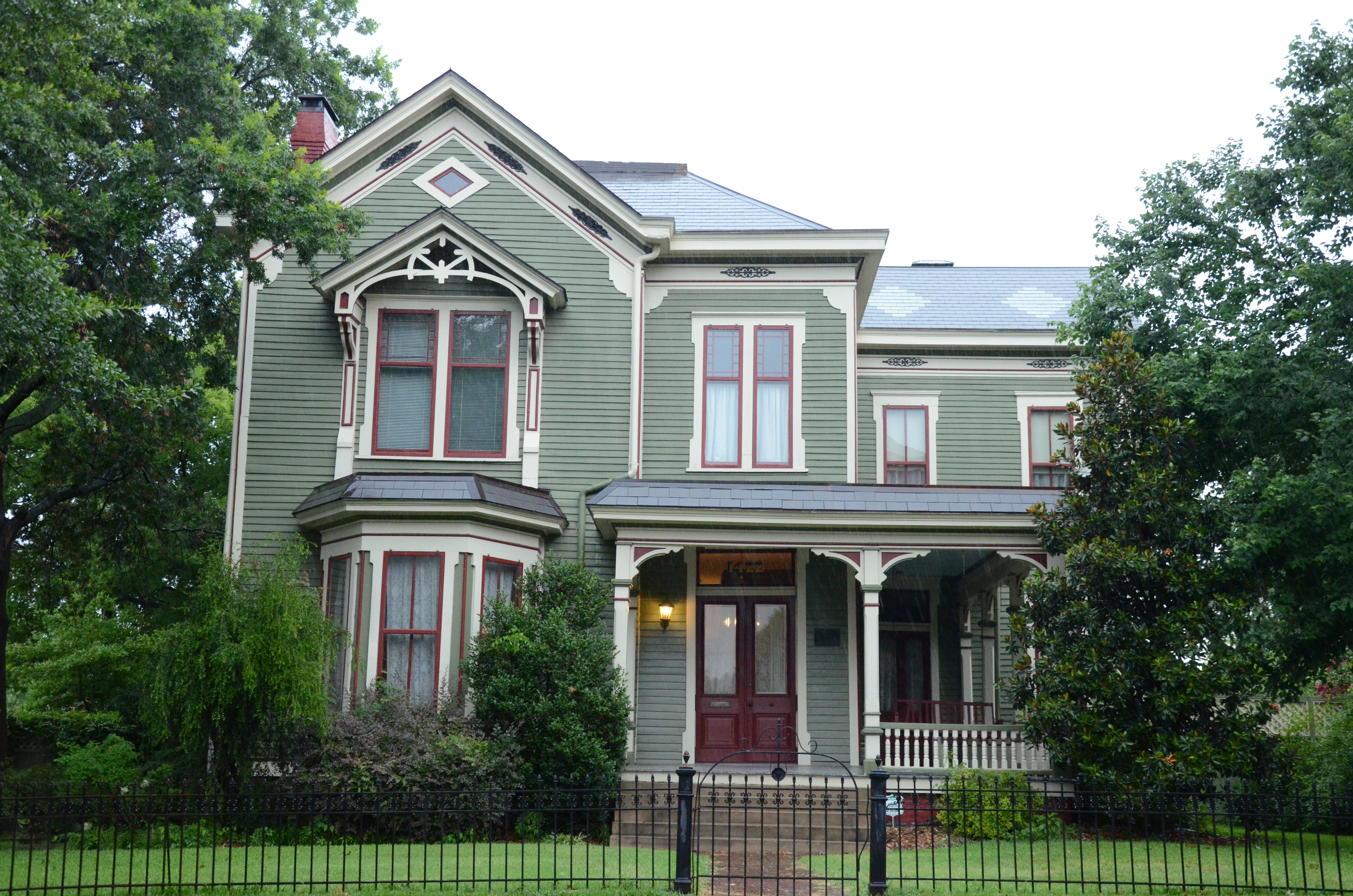

- Location within Arkansas Location within the United States
- Location: 1422 Scott St., Little Rock, Arkansas
- Coordinates: 34°44′5″N 92°16′23″W
- Area: less than one acre
- Built: 1878
- Architectural style: Queen Anne
- Part of: MacArthur Park Historic District (ID77000269)
- NRHP reference No.: 76000459

Significant dates
- Added to NRHP: January 1, 1976
- Designated CP: July 25, 1977

The William L. Terry House is a historic house at 1422 Scott Street in Little Rock, Arkansas. It is a roughly L-shaped 2-1/2 wood-frame structure, its appearance somewhat irregular due to the presence of projecting elements. Its porch extends across part of the front, and then the inside of the L, with bracketed square posts and a spindled balustrade. Built in the 1880s, it is a particularly elegant and restrained example of Queen Anne architecture.

The house was listed on the National Register of Historic Places in 1976.

== See also ==
- National Register of Historic Places listings in Little Rock, Arkansas
