= Henry Adolphus London House =

Historic house in North Carolina, United States

- U.S. National Register of Historic Places
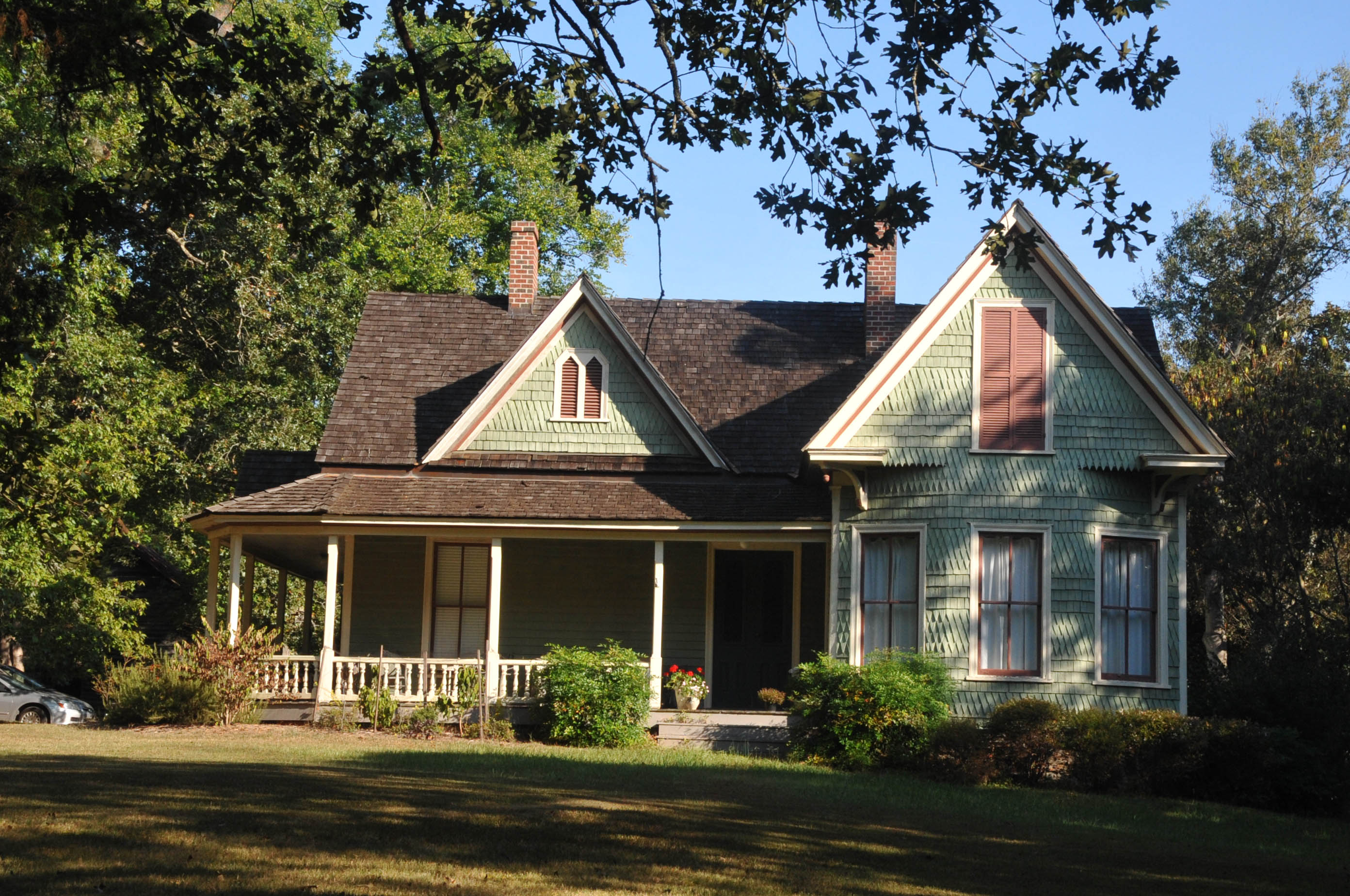
- Henry Adolphus London House, March 2007

- Location within North Carolina Location within the United States
- Location: 440 W. Salisbury St., Pittsboro, North Carolina
- Coordinates: 35°43′21″N 79°11′7″W
- Area: 2.1 acres (0.85 ha)
- Built: c. 1895
- Built by: Nooe, Bennett Jr.
- Architectural style: Queen Anne
- NRHP reference No.: 98001143
- Added to NRHP: September 3, 1998

Henry Adolphus London House is a historic home located at Pittsboro, Chatham County, North Carolina. It was built about 1895, is a one-story, three bay Queen Anne style frame cottage. It features a wraparound porch, projecting bay, and decorative wood shingles. Also on the property is a contributing two-story barn.

It was listed on the National Register of Historic Places in 1998.
