= London House (Johannesburg) =

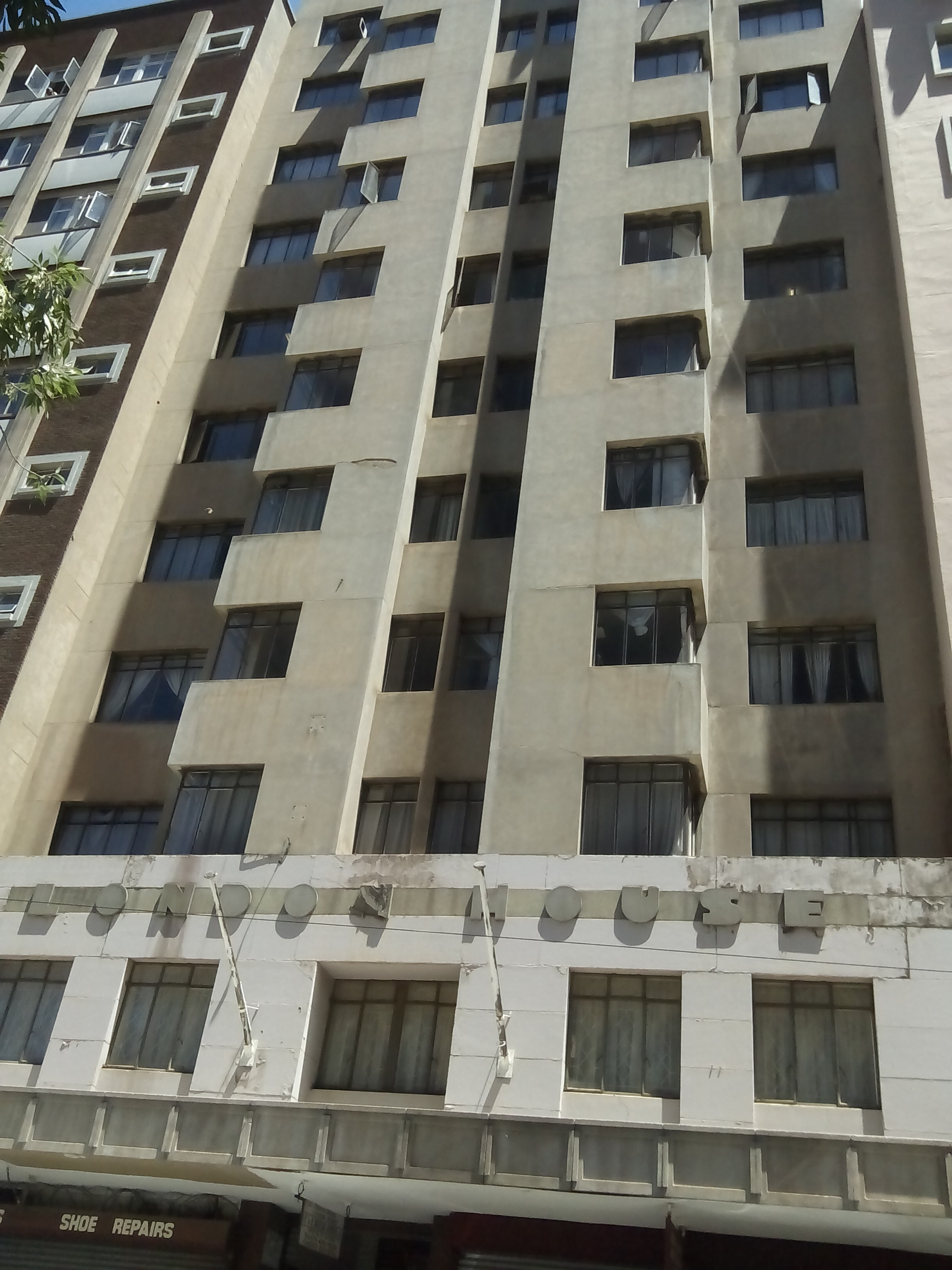
- 21 Loveday street

General information
- Status: Completed
- Type: Flats
- Location: Johannesburg, South Africa
- Coordinates: 26°12′11″S 28°2′6″E
- Completed: 6 March 1936

Height
- Roof: 98 metres (322 ft)

Technical details
- Floor count: 11

Design and construction
- Architect(s): Emily and Williamson

London House is a building in the city of Johannesburg constructed by the firm of Emily and Williamson. The Application for Approval of Plans was received by the City Engineer's Department on 18 March 1935 and approved ten months later 20 January 1936. The building was completed on 6 March 1936 as entered on the valuation roll, meaning it took two months to complete the building or construction to the building was started without approval of plans.

== Design ==
This building is part of the Johannesburg Art Deco legacy. It was designed as a shop to street and office building. However over the years it has been converted to rental apartments.
