= A. P. Terry House =

Historic house in North Carolina, United States

- A.P. Terry House
- U.S. National Register of Historic Places
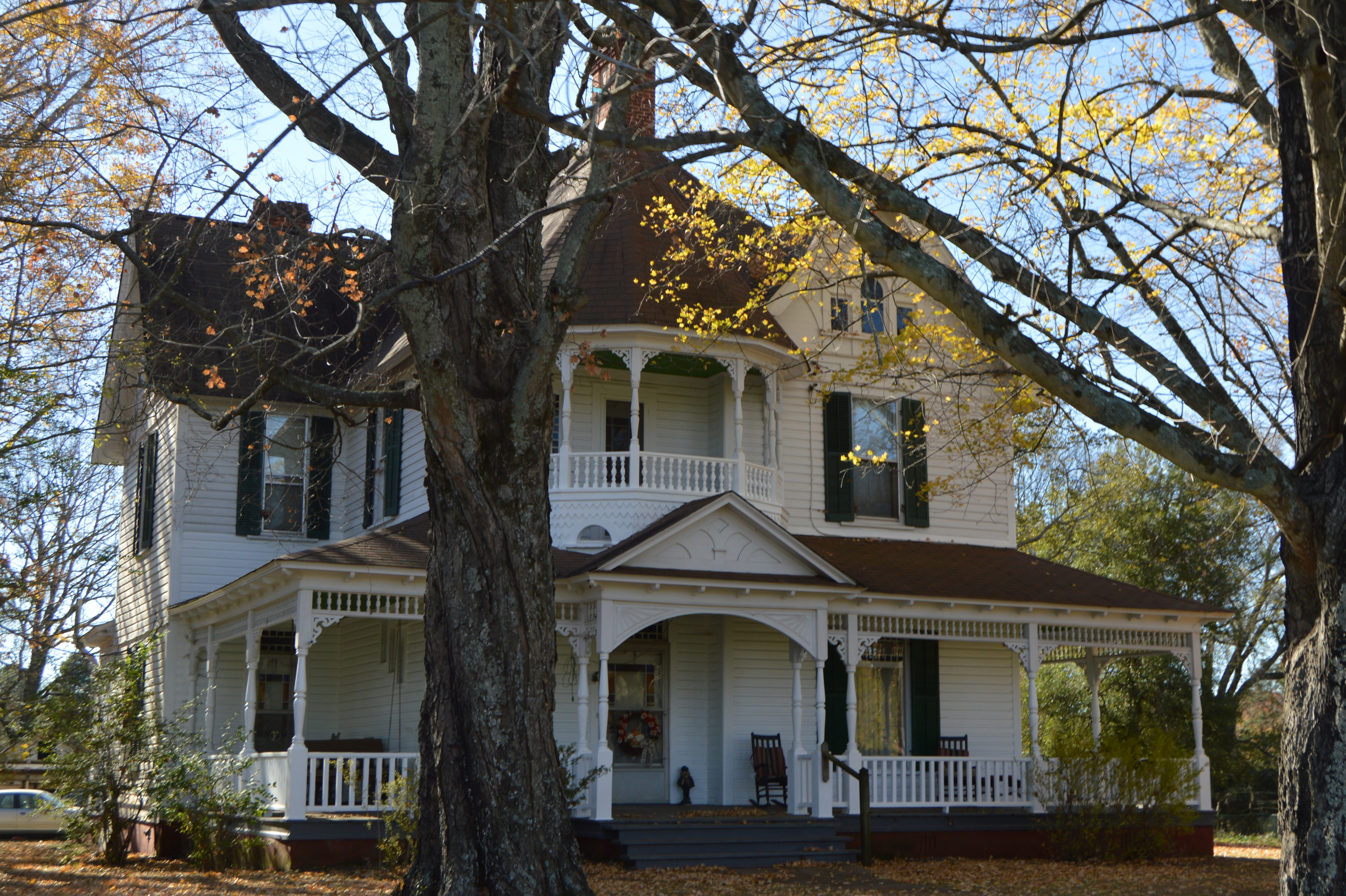
- Front of the house

- Location within North Carolina Location within the United States
- Location: 601 Womack St., Pittsboro, North Carolina
- Coordinates: 35°43′5″N 79°11′8″W
- Area: 11 acres (4.5 ha)
- Built: c. 1900
- Built by: Bennett Nooe, Jr.
- Architectural style: Queen Anne
- MPS: Pittsboro MRA
- NRHP reference No.: 82001292
- Added to NRHP: October 5, 1982

A. P. Terry House is a historic home located at Pittsboro, Chatham County, North Carolina. It was built about 1900, and is a two-story, three bay irregular plan Queen Anne style frame dwelling. It features a wraparound porch and open, second story tower.

It was listed on the National Register of Historic Places in 1982.
