= Lynching of Eugene Daniel =

- Part of Jim Crow Era
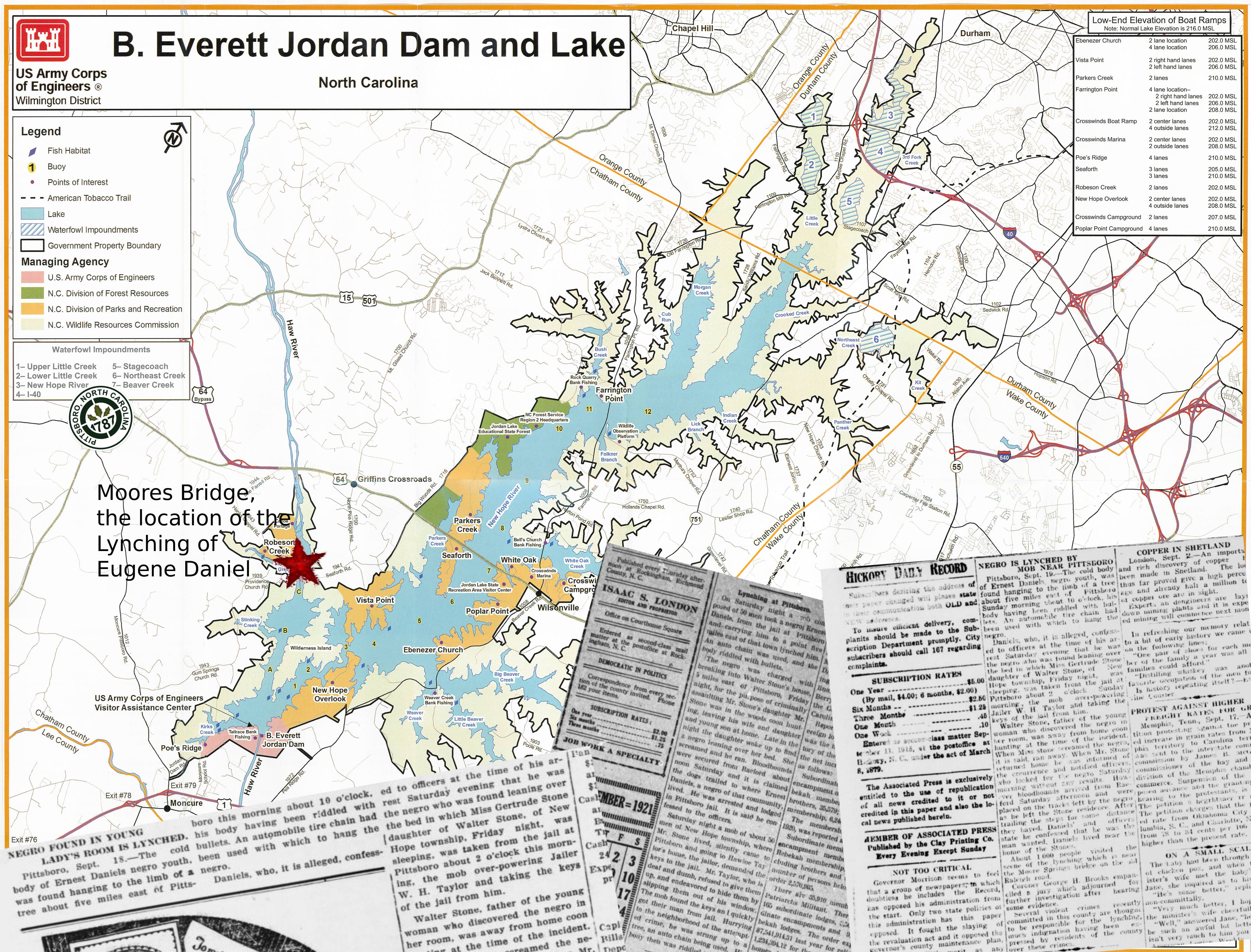
- Moores Bridge, the location of the Lynching of Eugene Daniel. Submerged after the creation of Jordan Lake.
- Date: September 18, 1921
- Location: Pittsboro, Chatham County, North Carolina
- Participants: A mob 50 white strong from Chatham County, North Carolina
- Deaths: 1

On September 18, 1921, 16-year-old Eugene Daniel was lynched for allegedly walking into a white girl's bedroom in Pittsboro, Chatham County, North Carolina, United States.

== Lynching ==
On Friday, September 16, 1921, five 5 miles (8.0 km) east of Pittsboro, North Carolina, Eugene Daniel, a 16-year-old Black child, wanted to borrow some twine. He walked into a neighbor's house and startled a white girl, Gertrude, the daughter of homeowner Walter Stone. Eugene Daniel quickly ran away but on Saturday, September 17, 1921, a bloodhound was acquired from Raeford, North Carolina. The hound tracked Daniel down and he was arrested. That night a mob formed and over-powered jailer W.H. Taylor and seized Daniel from the jail where he was being held. Near the Moore Springs Bridge on the old Raleigh road, he was lynched using an auto chain; the body was riddled with bullets. The dangling body became a tourist attraction for white residents and on Monday, September 19, 1921, 1,000 people trekked to see it.

In the 1970s, the area was submerged with water from the creation of Jordan Lake.

== Red Summer ==
Two years earlier there were several incidents of civil unrest in the so-called American Red Summer of 1919. There were terrorist attacks on black communities and white oppression in over three dozen cities and counties. In most cases, white mobs attacked African American neighborhoods. In some cases, black community groups resisted the attacks, especially in Chicago and Washington, D.C. Most deaths occurred in rural areas during events like the Elaine massacre in Arkansas, where an estimated 100 to 240 black people and 5 white people were killed. Also in 1919 were the Chicago Race Riot and Washington D.C. race riot which killed 38 and 39 people respectively. Both had many more non-fatal injuries and extensive property damage reaching into the millions of dollars.

== National memorial ==
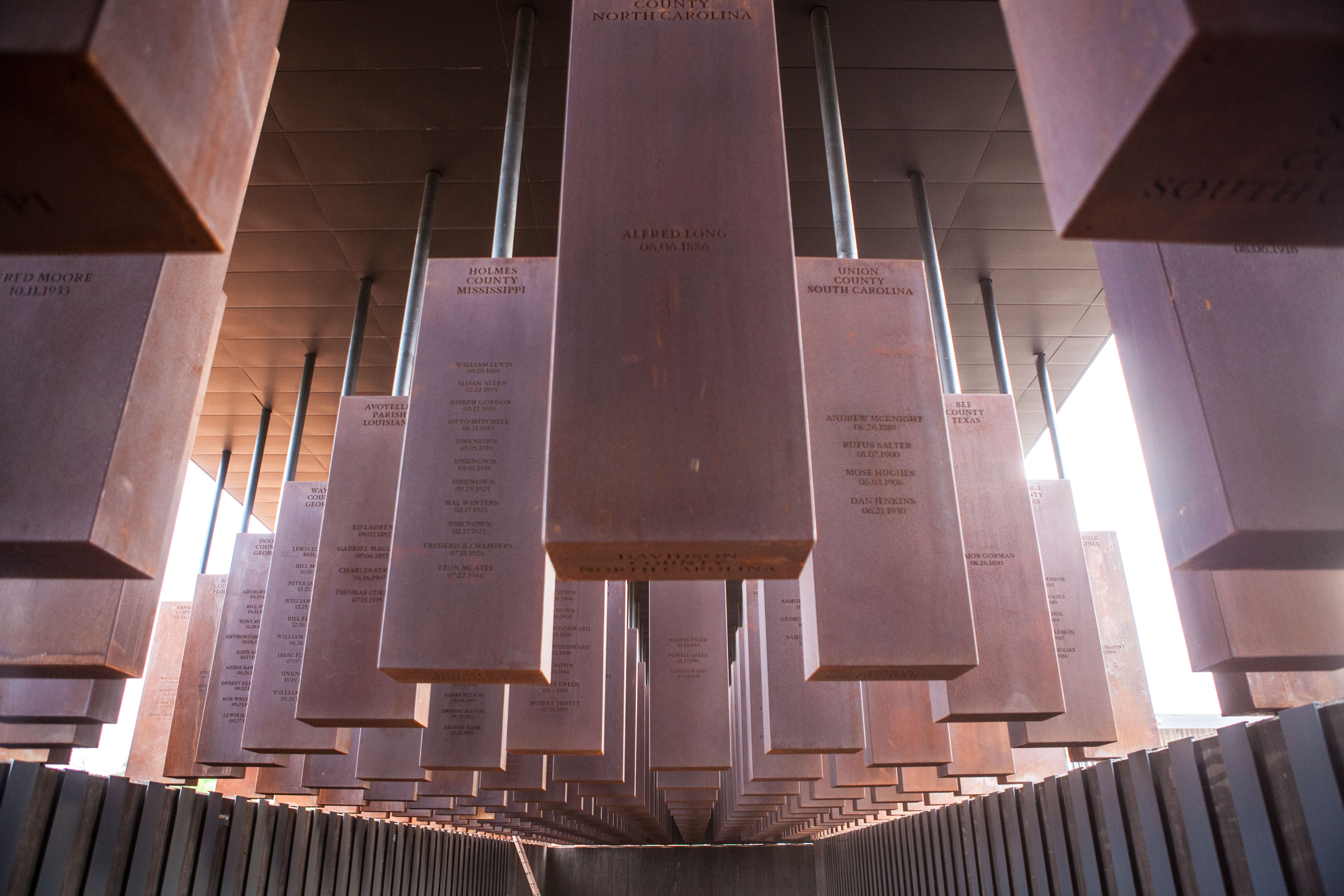
Memorial Corridor, National Memorial for Peace and Justice

The National Memorial for Peace and Justice opened in Montgomery, Alabama, on April 26, 2018, in a setting of 6 acres (2.4 ha). Featured among other things, is a sculpture by Kwame Akoto-Bamfo of a mother with a chain around her neck and an infant in her arms. On a hill overlooking the sculpture is the Memorial Corridor which displays 805 hanging steel rectangles, each representing the counties in the United States where a documented lynching took place and, for each county, the names of those lynched. At the memorial there are six lynching victims in Chatham County between the years 1885 and 1921:

- Harriet Finch, Jerry Finch, Lee Tyson, John Pattishall - September 30, 1885, the group was lynched for allegedly being axe murderers. Harriet Finch is 1 of only 4 lynchings of women to occur in North Carolina.
- Henry Jones - January 12, 1899, Jones was lynched after being accused of raping and murdering Nancy Welch/Welsh, a white widow in Chatham County in January 1899.
- Eugene Daniel

== Bibliography ==
Notes

References

- "Negro Is Lynched By Mob Near Pittsboro". Hickory Daily Record. Hickory, Catawba, North Carolina: Samuel Howard Farabee and Jacob Carlyle Miller. 2021. p. 6. ISSN 1061-5628. OCLC 13340814.
- The New York Times (October 5, 1919). "For Action on Race Riot Peril". The New York Times. New York, NY. ISSN 1553-8095. OCLC 1645522.
- "Lynching at Pittsboro". Rockingham Post-Dispatch. Rockingham, Richmond, North Carolina: Isaac Spencer London. 2021. p. 12. ISSN 2376-0168. OCLC 24789326.
