= Withers (surname) =

- Language: Old English

Origin
- Meaning: "Son of Ƿithar (Víðarr)", for proper earlier form
- Region of origin: England

Other names
- Variant forms: Wither, Wyther, Withars, Wider, Widder, Wythe, Weathers

Withers – earlier Wither, Wyther – is an English surname of Old English origin. It is today a not uncommon family name found throughout the Anglosphere.

== History ==
The name appears on various early documents in England, such as a charter of Æthelred II in 1005 where a witness signs as "Ego Ƿiþer minister" (I Wither, the assistant). In the Domesday Book of 1086 it is the name of a tenant prior to that date. It seems to be a personal name, rather than a place name or occupational name, of unknown meaning: suggestions have included "wood", "withstand", "warrior" or "willow".

While the name occurs in connection with landholdings in various counties of England before the 1150s, the first continuous record of a family seems to be in Lancashire and Cheshire where Sir Robert Wither, knight, of Pendleton and of Halton, was seneschal to Roger de Lacy, who died in 1211. He is recorded as marrying Joan, daughter of Sir Adam Bostock, knight, of Davenham.

By the 15th century, families claiming descent from Sir Robert Wither were living in Cheshire, Lancashire, Wiltshire, Essex, London, Somerset and Hampshire. The Withers in Hampshire, deriving from a member who migrated from Lancashire in the 14th century, were particularly prominent. From 1484, they were lords of the manor of Manydown near Wootton St Lawrence, remaining linked to that estate for more than 400 years.

== Coat of arms ==
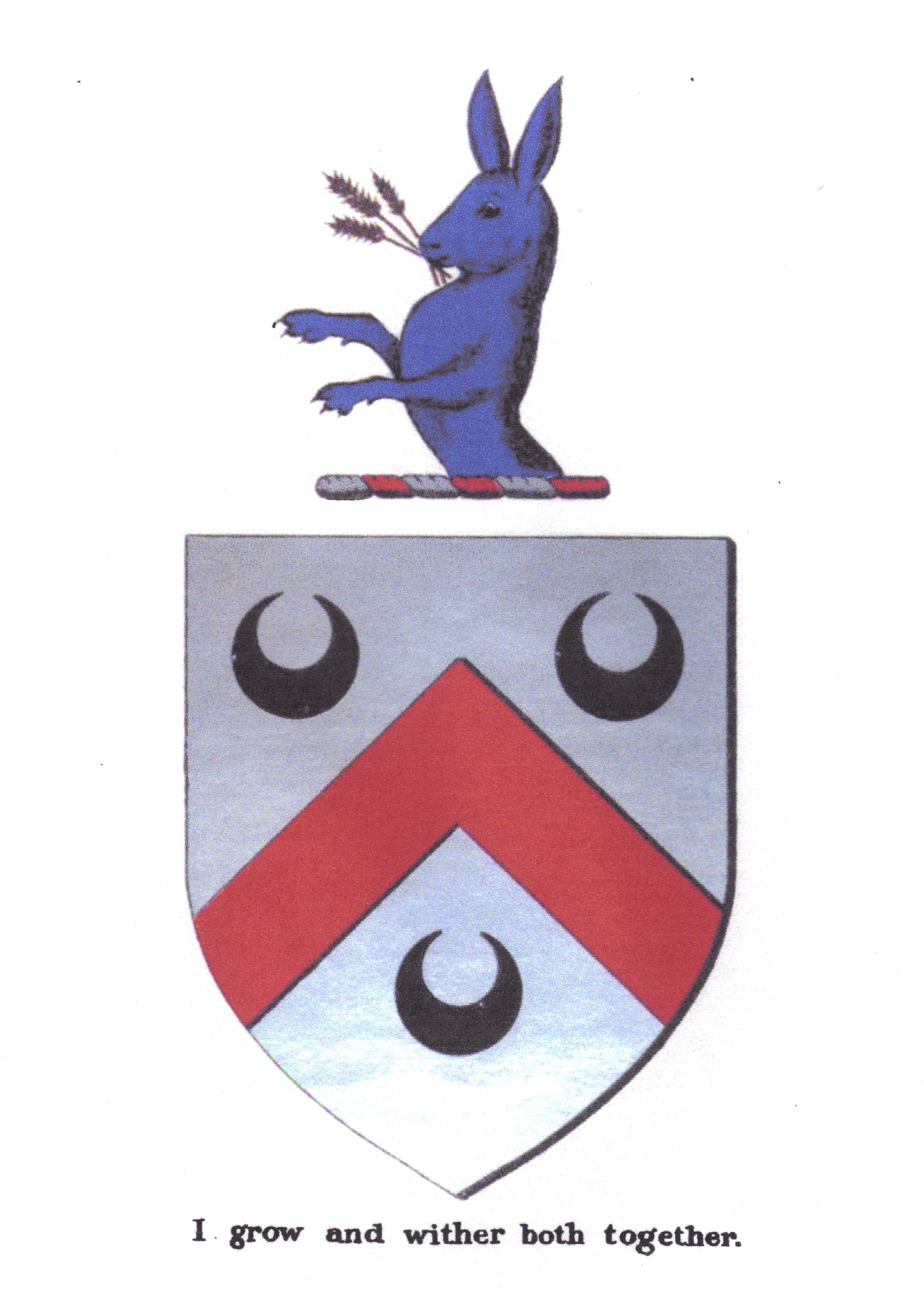
Withers of East Sheen arms and crest

One Withers was granted a coat of arms. In the reign of Queen Mary I (1553–1558), Sir Richard Withers of East Sheen (ancestor of the poet George Wither) received a coat registered in the College of Arms, London. The blazon has "Argent, a chevron gules between three crescents sable" (i.e., White/silver field, red chevron between 3 black crescents). The traditional family motto is "I grow and wither both together".

== Notable people named Withers, Wither, or Wyther ==
=== Activists ===
- Dean Withers (born 2004), American political activist

=== Actors ===
- Bernadette Withers (1946–2019), American actress
- Googie Withers (1917–2011), British movie actress
- Grant Withers (1905–1959), American movie actor
- Isabel Withers (1896–1968), American actress
- Jane Withers (1926–2021), American radio, television and movie actress
- Mark Withers (actor) (1947–2024), American television actor
- Tyriq Withers (born 1998), American actor

=== Ambassadors ===
- John L. Withers, II (born 1948), US Ambassador to Albania

=== Artists and architects ===
- Ernest Withers (1922–2007), African-American photographer
- Frederick Clarke Withers (1828–1901), British-American Gothic Revival architect
- Margery Withers (1894–1966), Australian artist (daughter of Walter Withers)
- Robert Jewell Withers (1824–1894), English ecclesiastical architect, brother of Frederick
- Walter Withers (1854–1914), Australian landscape artist

=== Athletes ===
- Bob Withers (born 1933), Australian Rules footballer
- Charlie Withers (1922–2005), English footballer
- Colin Withers (1940–2020), English footballer
- David D. Withers (1821–1892), American racehorse breeder
- Godwin Withers (1884–1976), British athlete in the 1908 Summer Olympics
- H. W. Withers (1884–1949), American college basketball and football coach
- Jae'Lyn Withers (born 2000), American basketball player
- Lincoln Withers (born 1981), Australian rugby league player
- Mark Withers (footballer) (born 1964), Australian Rules footballer
- Michael Withers (born 1976), Australian rugby league footballer
- Ted Withers (1915–1994), English footballer who played for Southampton and Bristol Rovers

=== Military ===
- Henry Withers (c. 1651–1729), British soldier and politician
- Jones M. Withers (1814–1890), American Confederate major general; lawyer and politician
- Martin Withers (born 1946), Royal Air Force pilot in Operation Black Buck
- Ramsey Muir Withers (1930–2014), Canadian Army general, Chief of the Defence Staff

=== Musicians ===
- Bill Withers (1938–2020), African-American singer-songwriter
- Elisabeth Withers (born 1970), American jazz/R&B singer
- Pick Withers (born 1948), British rock and jazz drummer

=== Politicians ===
- Charles Bigg Wither (1822–1894), member of the New Zealand Legislative Council
- Elijah Benton Withers (1836–1898), American politician
- Eugene Withers (1867–1925), American politician
- Garrett L. Withers (1884–1953), American politician
- George Withers (politician) (1843–1908), Australian politician
- Capt. John Withers (1634–1699), burgess and justice in colonial Virginia
- Sir John Withers (1863–1939), British politician
- Reginald Withers (1924–2014), Australian politician
- Robert E. Withers (1821–1907), physician, US Senator and diplomat
- Thomas Jefferson Withers (1804–1865), Confederate politician during the American Civil War
- William Withers (1657–1720), English politician, Lord Mayor of London 1707–1708
- William A. Withers (died 1887), mayor of Cumberland, Maryland, USA

=== Writers ===
- Alexander Scott Withers (1792–1865), American historian of early Appalachian Indian-white warfare
- Charles W. J. Withers (born 1954), Scottish historical geographer
- George Wither (1588–1667), English poet and satirist

=== Fictional characters ===
- Hildegarde Withers, in novels by Stuart Palmer

== See also ==
- Withers (disambiguation)
