= Withers (disambiguation) =

The withers is a part of the back of a horse, dog or other quadruped.

Withers or Wither may also refer to

== People ==
- Withers (surname), several notable people
- Withers A. Burress (1894–1977), American soldier
- Wither (comics), fictional character in the Marvel Universe

== Buildings ==
- Withers Building, Winthrop University, South Carolina, USA
- Withers-Maguire House, historic home in Ocoee, Florida, USA

== Books ==
- Wither (Passarella novel), a 1999 novel by Joseph Gangemi under the pseudonym "J.G. Passarella"
- Wither (DeStefano novel), a 2011 novel by Lauren DeStefano

== Other ==
- Wither (song), a 2009 song by Dream Theater
- "Wither", a song by Agents Of Oblivion from Agents Of Oblivion
- Withers Stakes, American horse-race
- Withers (law firm), founded 1896 in London, England
- Wither (film), a 2012 film
- Withers, West Virginia, a community in the United States
- Withers, Western Australia, a suburb in Bunbury
- Wither, a boss from the 2011 video game Minecraft
- Wither, a 2018 album by iamjakehill
