= Longtail snake =

Longtail snake may refer to the following genus:

- Enulius

It may also refer to the following species:

- Colombian longtail snake, Enuliophis sclateri
