= John Hurt (disambiguation) =

John Hurt may refer to

- John Hurt, actor
- Mississippi John Hurt, musician
- John L. Hurt, politician
- John Hurt (chaplain)

== See also ==
- John Hirt, Australian pastor
- John Hurt Fisher, literary scholar and medievalist
