= Joseph R. Anderson =

American civil engineer, industrialist, and soldier (1813–1892)

Joseph Reid Anderson
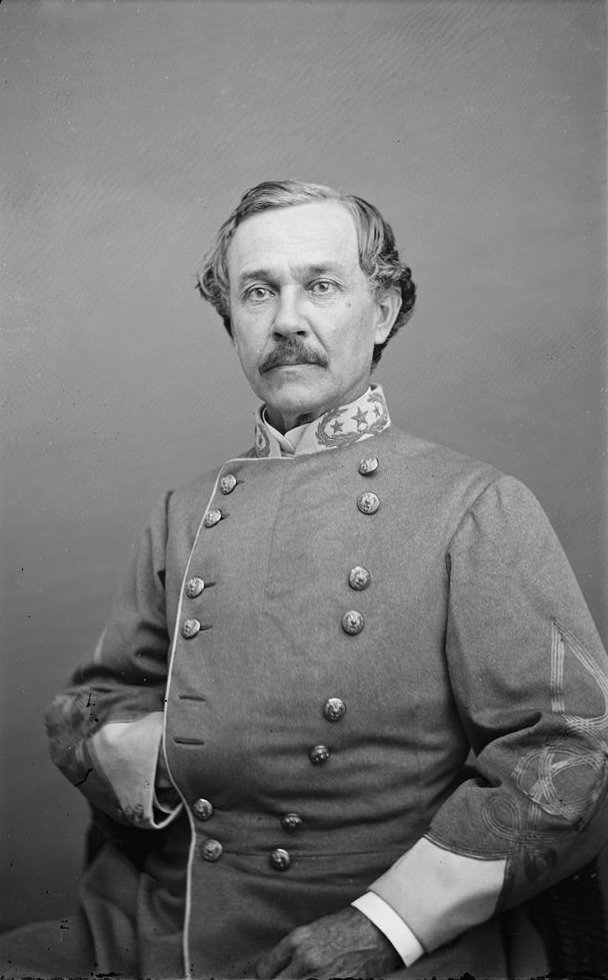
- Anderson, c. 1861–1865
- Born: February 16, 1813; Fincastle, Virginia, U.S.
- Died: September 7, 1892 (aged 79); Isles of Shoals, New Hampshire, U.S.
- Burial place: Hollywood Cemetery; Richmond, Virginia, U.S.
- Spouse: Sara Eliza Archer
- Military career
- Allegiance: United States; Confederate States
- Branch: United States Army; Confederate States Army
- Service years: 1836–1837 (USA); 1861–1862 (CSA)
- Rank: Second Lieutenant (USA); Brigadier General (CSA)
- Conflicts: American Civil War; Peninsula Campaign; Seven Days Battles; Battle of Beaver Dam Creek; Battle of Gaines' Mill; Battle of Glendale
- Other work: Industrialist

Joseph Reid Anderson (February 16, 1813 – September 7, 1892) was an American civil engineer, industrialist, politician and soldier. During the American Civil War he served as a Confederate general, and his Tredegar Iron Company was a major source of munitions and ordnance for the Confederate States Army. Starting with a small forge and rolling mill in the mid-1830s, It was a flourishing operation by 1843 when he leased it. He eventually bought the company outright in 1848 and forcefully and aggressively built Tredegar Iron Works into the South's largest and most significant iron works. When the Civil War broke out he entered the Army as a brigadier general in 1861. Shortly after he was wounded and then resigned from the Army returning to the iron works. It was the Confederacy's major (and for much of the war only) source of cannons and munitions, employing some 900 workers, most of whom were slaves. His plant was confiscated by the Union army at the end of the war, but returned to him in 1867 and he remained president until his death. Anderson was very active in local civic and political affairs.

== Early and family life ==
Joseph Reid Anderson was born at "Walnut Hill" near Fincastle, the county seat of Botetourt County, Virginia in 1813. The grandson of Scotch-Irish immigrants, he was the son of Colonel William Anderson (1764–1839) and Anne (née Thomas) Anderson. The elder Anderson had served in the American Revolutionary War, and was also a colonel of a Virginia regiment in the War of 1812. Joseph's father was a self-taught engineer and surveyor and was later responsible for the building of the turnpike that is now U.S. Route 220 and (for part of the way) U.S. Route 60 from Fincastle to Covington. Col. Anderson's son was to follow in similar work.

In 1832, Joseph was appointed to the United States Military Academy at West Point, New York, and graduated 4th in his class in 1836. He was assigned to the 3rd Artillery.

Anderson married Sara Eliza Archer, daughter of Dr. Robert Archer, the post surgeon at Fort Monroe at the entrance to Hampton Roads in Elizabeth City County, Virginia. Seeking better prospects than army life promised, in 1837, he resigned to work as a civil engineer with Virginia State Engineer Claudius Crozet, who had earlier been a professor of engineering at West Point. Under the Virginia Board of Public Works, Anderson became Assistant State Engineer and served was chief engineer of the Valley Turnpike Company, a toll road which extended between Staunton and Winchester, Virginia in the Shenandoah Valley from 1838 until 1841.

== Early military and political careers ==
In recognition of his engineering abilities, Anderson was assigned as an assistant engineer in the Engineer Bureau in Washington before being officially transferred to the United States Army Corps of Engineers on July 1, 1837, as a brevet second lieutenant. His primary duty with the Corps of Engineers was in the construction of Fort Pulaski to guard the Port of Savannah, Georgia. From 1838 to 1841, Anderson was chief engineer of the Valley Turnpike Company.

In 1841, Anderson joined the Tredegar Iron Company in Richmond, Virginia, eventually becoming its owner in 1848. By 1860, he was a leading industrialist in the South and his foundry on the James River was one of the largest in the United States, producing steam locomotives, boilers, cables, naval hardware, and cannon.

In 1852, delegate William C. Carrington, who represented Richmond in the Virginia General Assembly. Anderson won the special election to succeed him, and would be re-elected several times. He served initially alongside William F. Butler and Conway Robinson, and after A. Judson Crane resigned, alongside George N. Johnson. He was re-elected in 1853, but his fellow delegates became James A. Cowarding and Henry K. Ellyson. He failed to win election to the assembly of 1855-56, but did win election to the House of Delegates again in 1857, this time serving with Roscoe B. Heath and Richard O. Haskins.

== Civil War ==
When the Civil War came, the Tredegar Iron Company emerged as the industrial heart of the Confederate States of America. Using slave and free labor, Anderson supervised ordnance and munitions production through most of the war.

Anderson, a supporter of southern secession and states' rights, was commissioned a major of artillery in August 1861, and promoted to brigadier general in the Confederate Army on September 3. Initially assigned to command the Confederate forces at Wilmington, North Carolina, in April 1862, he was reassigned to the area around Fredericksburg, Virginia, opposite Union Maj. Gen. Irvin McDowell.

With the mounting threat to Richmond during the Peninsula Campaign, Anderson was placed in command of the 3rd Brigade in A.P. Hill's newly formed "Light Division". During the Seven Days Battles, he led his brigade at Mechanicsville, Gaines Mill, and Glendale, where he received a concussion from being hit in the head by a spent musket ball. Anderson was left disoriented and confused by the incident and spent the next few weeks recovering.

General Anderson resigned his army commission on July 19, 1862, and served the Confederate war effort in the Ordnance Department until the evacuation of Richmond on the night of April 2–3, 1865. As the retreating Confederate troops burned many of the munitions dumps and industrial warehouses that would have been valuable to the North, Anderson reportedly paid over fifty armed guards to protect the Tredegar facility from arsonists. As a result, the Tredegar Iron Works is one of few Civil War era buildings in the warehouse district that survived the burning of Richmond.

== Postbellum activities ==
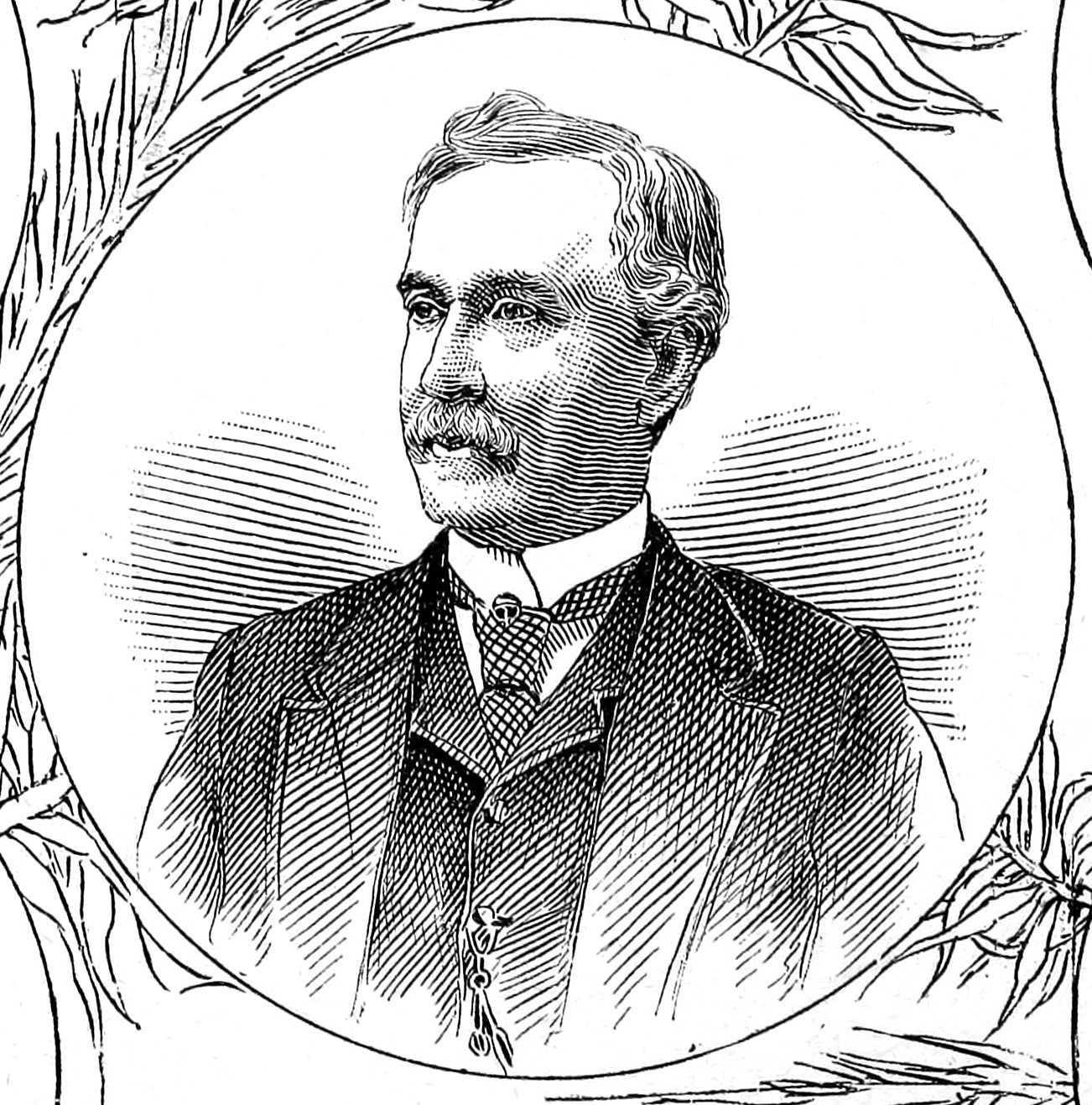
Engraving of Anderson from an 1886 book on Richmond industries.

During the Federal occupation of Richmond, the U.S. government had confiscated the Tredegar Iron Company's property, but Anderson regained control in 1867 and remained a prominent Virginia businessman as its president. His son, Archer Anderson, became involved in the business, and became president of the Tredegar Iron Works after his father's death. Another son Joseph Reid Anderson Jr., went to the Virginia Military Institute after the Civil War and later taught there; and is considered to be the "Second Founder" of the Alpha Tau Omega fraternity.

Anderson was elected again to the Virginia House of Delegates to represent Richmond in 1873, this time serving alongside William S. Gilman, William Lovenstein, James H. Dooley and Robert Ould, although he failed to win re-election two years later. His final term in the House of Delegates was from 1877 to 1879, when he served alongside Samuel H. Pulliam, George K. Crutchfield, W. W. Henry and B. C. Gray.

After his wife Sara died in 1881, Anderson remarried. His second wife was Mary Evans Pegram, making him a brother-in-law to Confederate General John Pegram and Colonel William Ransom Johnson Pegram, both of whom had been killed during the war.

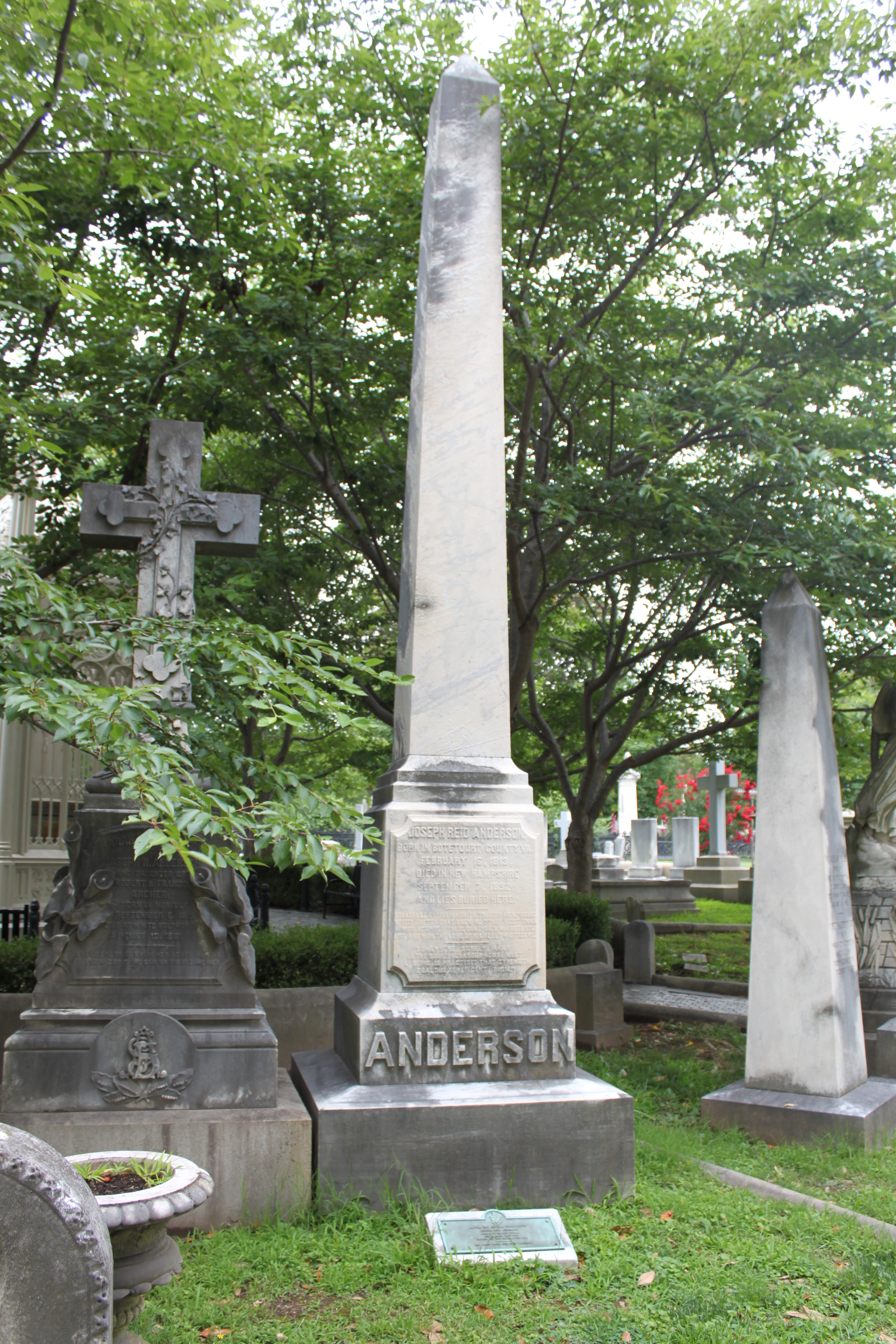
Grave of Anderson in Hollywood Cemetery

Anderson died while on a vacation at the Isles of Shoals, New Hampshire. It was widely reported that 30,000 citizens came to his funeral when he was buried in Hollywood Cemetery in Richmond, Virginia.

== Honors ==
Today, Anderson's former Tredegar Iron Works facility overlooking the James River near downtown Richmond is the site of the main Visitor Center of the Richmond National Battlefield Park, as well as another museum.

== See also ==
- His great niece, Ellen Glasgow, was a Pulitzer Prize winning American novelist.
- List of American Civil War generals (Confederate)
