= Thomas Plantagenet Bigg-Wither =

English engineer & writer (1845–1890)

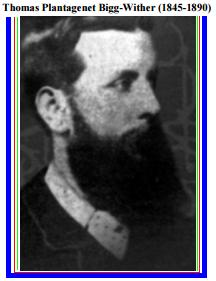
Thomas Plantagenet Bigg-Wither (1845–1890)

Thomas Plantagenet Bigg-Wither (16 October 1845, in Hampshire – 19 July 1890, in High Seas) was an English engineer and writer.

Lovelace Bigg-Wither (1805–1874), who was Lord of the Manor at Manydown, was his father. Charles Bigg Wither, a younger brother of his father, was thus his uncle.

Between 1871 and 1875, he participated in an expedition in the Brazilian province of Paraná in southern Brazil.

Upon returning to England, he published the book Pioneering in South Brazil. He also published an article called "The valley of the Tibagy, Brazil" with the Royal Geographical Society.

In the 1880s, he worked as chief engineer of a railroad in India. In 1890, he became ill and when he returned to England, died on the ship and was buried at sea.
