= John Withers =

John Withers may refer to:

- John Withers (burgess), colonial Virginia legislator
- John L. Withers, II, U.S. diplomat and ambassador to Albania from 2007 to 2010
- John James Withers (1863–1939), a British politician and Conservative Member of Parliament from 1926 to 1939
