= Charles Bigg Wither =

Member of New Zealand Legislative Council in 1863

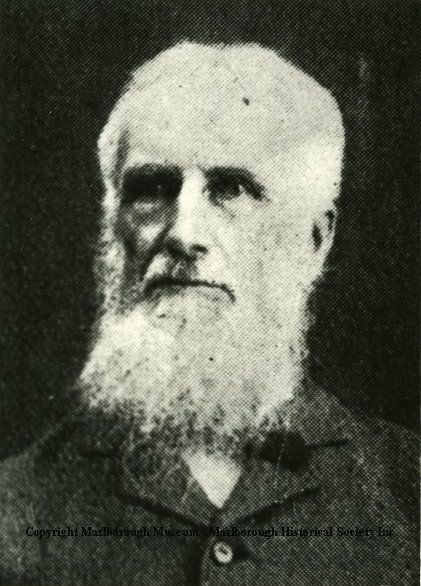

Member of the New Zealand Legislative Council
- In office 15 October 1863 – 9 November 1863

Personal details
- Born: 27 April 1822 Manydown Park, Wootton St Lawrence, Hampshire, England
- Died: 28 June 1894 (aged 72) Wensley Hill, Richmond, New Zealand
- Resting place: Richmond Cemetery
- Relations: Thomas Plantagenet Bigg-Wither (nephew)
- Education: University of Edinburgh
- Occupation: farmer

Charles Bigg Wither, or Charles Bigg-Wither (27 April 1822 – 28 June 1894) was a member of the New Zealand Legislative Council for a short period in 1863.

== Early life and ancestry ==
Wither was born in 1822 at Manydown Park, a manor in Wootton St Lawrence, Hampshire, England. His father was Harris Bigg-Wither (1781–1838), who was Lord of the Manor at Manydown from 1813 to 1833 and is famous for having proposed to Jane Austen. The engineer and writer Thomas Plantagenet Bigg-Wither, a son of his eldest brother Lovelace Bigg-Wither (1805–1874), was his nephew. The Lords of the Manor at Manydown were initially from the Wither family. When William Wither V (1733–1789) died, he had no heir, and a cousin with the surname Bigg—the Reverend Lovelace Bigg (1741–1813)—became his successor. He and his sons took on the surname Bigg-Wither. In all New Zealand sources, Charles Bigg Wither is referred to simply as Wither (or C. B. Wither) and thus appears to have used Bigg as his middle name only.

== Biography ==
Wither received his education at Winchester and at the University of Edinburgh. He came to New Zealand on the Ursula in 1843 and settled near Nelson. He owned a sheep station at the Taylor River upstream from Blenheim from about 1848. He sold the land in 1867 to Ralph Richardson and to the father of Henry Redwood. The Wither Hills south of Blenheim, which were part of his sheep run, are named after him. Wither himself lived in Richmond where he had another farm.

Wither was one of the original nine trustees of Nelson College; other notable foundation trustees were Charles Elliott, David Monro, John Barnicoat, William Wells, and Alfred Domett.

Wither was a member of the Legislative Council from 15 October to 9 November 1863, when he resigned. His membership appeared in a gazette notice (stating that he had been summoned to the council), but he declined the membership.

Wither died at Wensley Hill in Richmond on 28 June 1894. He is buried at Richmond Cemetery. His sons Frederick and James were the executors of his will.
