= George William Bagby =

American physician and humorist

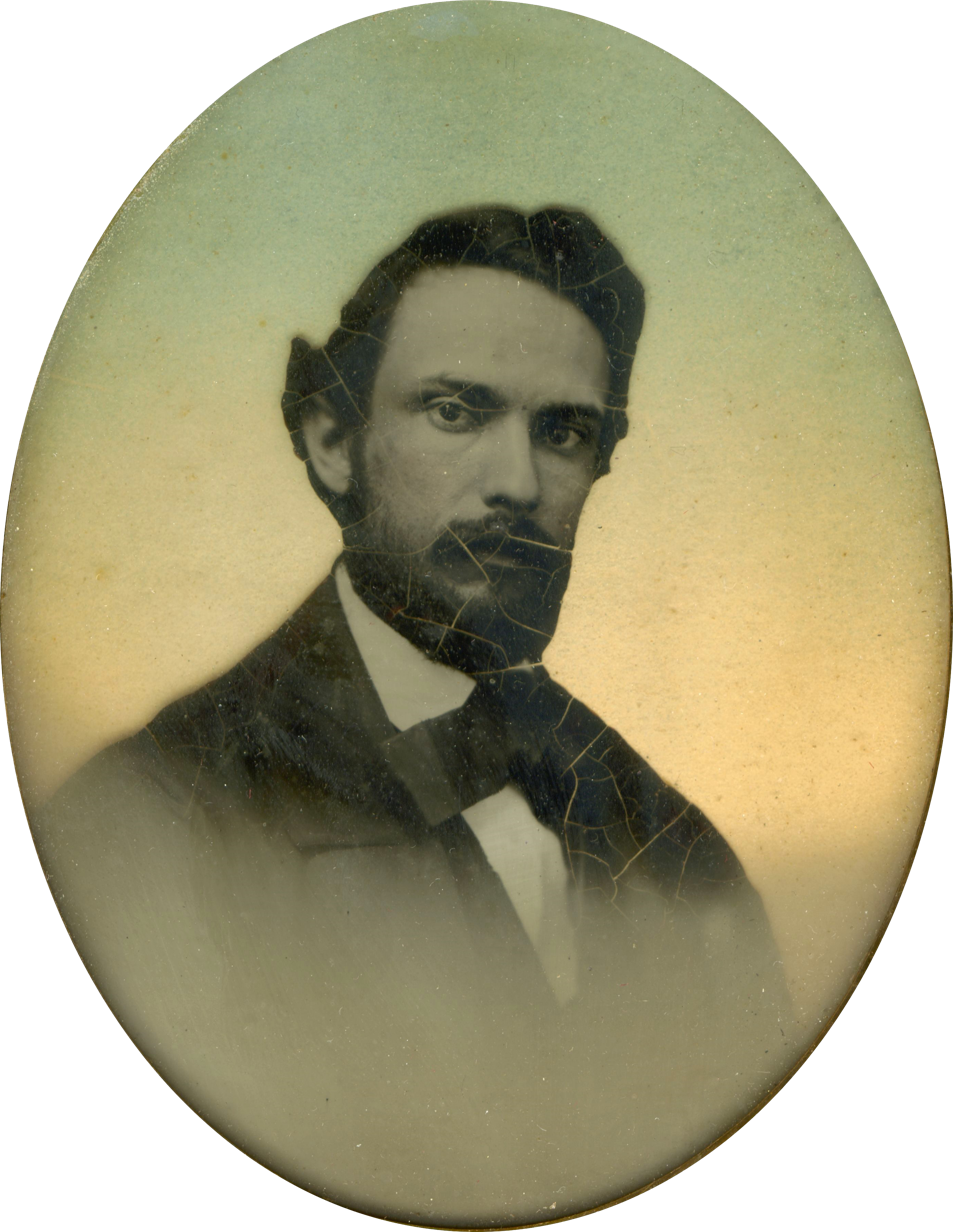
- Born: August 13, 1828; Buckingham County, Virginia, U.S.
- Died: November 29, 1883 (aged 55); Shockoe Hill Cemetery; Richmond City, Virginia, U.S.
- Spouse: Lucy Parke Chamberlayne (m. 1863)
- Children: 8
- Relatives: John Hampden Chamberlayne (brother-in-law)

George William Bagby (August 13, 1828 – November 29, 1883) was an American medical doctor and humorist.

== Early life and education ==
He was born in Buckingham County, Virginia, to George Bagby and Virginia Evans. He attended Delaware College and the University of Pennsylvania, where he studied medicine.

== Career ==
After finishing his studies, Bagby became engaged in editorial work, especially on the Southern Literary Messenger from 1859 to near the end of the American Civil War. Subsequently, he was made the state librarian and became widely known as a lecturer and humorist, writing under the name "Mozis Addums."

He kept alive the old school of Southern humor, founded by Augustus Baldwin Longstreet and Johnson J. Hooper. An example of that humor, which contained local dialect, phonetic spelling and an eccentric character, is Rubenstein's Piano-Playin. It is a short narrative of a surly, less-than-sophisticated soul, who describes how he was deeply moved by a piano concert. His works were collected in three volumes (Richmond, 1884–86).

Bagby is less known for his work as a journalist. As the Richmond correspondent of the Charleston Mercury during the Civil War, Bagby covered the politics of the war and made a reputation for Hermes, his pen name, as a fearless writer who would criticize Confederate General Robert E. Lee as easily as Confederate President Jefferson Davis.

== Personal life ==
Bagby married Lucy Parke Chamberlayne in 1863. She was daughter of Lewis Webb Chamberlayne, sister of John Hampden Chamberlayne and descendant of William Byrd II. They had eight children, Mrs. Henry Taylor Jr., J. H. C., Mrs. George Gordon Battle, Mrs. Charles E. Bolling, Robert Coleman, George W. Jr., Ellen N. and Phillip H.

== Legacy ==
Bagby's most popular essay was "The Old Virginia Gentleman" (1877), a paean to antebellum plantation life in Virginia.
