= Samuel H. Pulliam =

American soldier and politician (1841–1908)

Member of the Virginia House of Delegates from the Richmond district
- In office December 5, 1877 – December 2, 1878 Serving with George K. Crutchfield, Joseph R. Anderson, W. W. Henry, B. C. Gray
- Preceded by: James H. Dooley
- Succeeded by: William Lovenstein

Personal details
- Born: January 19, 1841 Henrico County, Virginia, U.S.
- Died: April 6, 1908 (aged 67) Richmond, Virginia, U.S.
- Spouse: Kathleen Crenshaw
- Children: Samuel H. Pulliam Jr.
- Education: University of Virginia
- Occupation: businessman, politician

Military service
- Allegiance: Virginia; Confederate States of America
- Branch/service: artillery
- Rank: sergeant, lieutenant
- Unit: Martin's Richmond Battery
- Battles/wars: Siege of Petersburg

Samuel Henry Pulliam (January 19, 1841 – April 6, 1908) was an American soldier. He was a Confederate soldier during the American Civil War who became a Virginia insurance agent, businessman, and Democratic politician, serving four years on the city council of Richmond, Virginia, and one term in the Virginia House of Delegates.

== Early and family life ==
Samuel Henry Pulliam was born in Richmond, Virginia, on January 19, 1841, to Samuel Thompson Pulliam (July 26, 1802 – July 19, 1865), who was Richmond's city recorder, and his second wife, Henrietta Mulls Jackson, daughter of Elisha Jackson. His paternal grandfather Mosby Pulliam (1765-1823) served in the state militia and until the war ended at Yorktown, and later received a pension. His maternal great grandfather John Jackson of Louisa County, Virginia, was a private in the Continental Army, served until the war's end, and ultimately received a federal pension. Samuel Pulliam had an older half-brother, Robert Mosby Pulliam (1831-1897), and an older half-sister, Maria Pulliam (1836-?) (their mother Clara Waller Godfrey dying in 1837) as well as a younger sister, Henrietta Pulliam (1847-?). Educated at private schools, Samuel Pulliam then studied mathematics at Richmond College (later the University of Richmond) and at Charlottesville, ultimately graduating from the University of Virginia.

In 1850, his father Samuel T. Pulliam owned nine enslaved people. A possibly related David M. Pulliam operated an auction house with Hector Davis on Franklin Street and sold enslaved people. Yet another source indicates the Richmond slave traders Pulliam & Davis of Richmond's Wall Street included Albert C. Pulliam or Peter Pulliam of Locust Alley.

Samuel Pulliam married Kathleen Crenshaw, the youngest daughter of Lewis D. Crenshaw (1817-1875), who was a partner in the Haxall, Crenshaw and Co. flour mill in Richmond and whom Pulliam characterized as the last acting commissary general of the Confederate States (although the pardon application forwarded by Governor Francis X. Pierpont during Congressional Reconstruction characterized his company as merely contracting to supply the Confederate stores). Lewis Crenshaw bought and remodeled the house that became the White House of the Confederacy shortly before the Civil War and sold it to the City of Richmond in 1861. They had a son, Samuel Henry Pulliam Jr. (1894-1983).

== American Civil War ==
In April 1862, Pulliam enlisted as a private in a light artillery company formed from southern Virginia and North Carolina volunteers by S. Taylor Martin. About three months later he was promoted to orderly sergeant of Martin's Battery, and in October 1863 was promoted to First Lieutenant and led the unit when Capt. Martin was absent. It was part of what was sometimes called the 12th Virginia Artillery Battalion, or Anderson's Corps Artillery and served around Richmond as well as in southeastern Virginia and North Carolina.

== Career ==
After General Lee's surrender and his own discharge, Pulliam returned to Richmond and considered teaching. He used his mathematical abilities and became an agent for the Mutual Assurance Society of Virginia, initially assessing wartime claims in Norfolk and Petersburg. He also succeeded his father as Richmond's recorder and became active in the local Democratic Party. He was a member of the Democratic City Central Committee and also served four years on Richmond's city council. In 1875, Pulliam organized a fire insurance company that operated in Virginia and other states, but when that company closed he became a general insurance agent with an office in Richmond.

Richmond voters elected Pulliam to the Virginia House of Delegates (a part-time position) in 1877, where he served one term (none of the four men serving with Pulliam were re-elected either). He then returned to his real estate and insurance pursuits, and also became active in the Sons of the American Revolution and in 1900 served as the Vice President of the Virginia state society.

== Death and legacy ==
Pulliam died on April 6, 1908. The O. Winston Link Museum in Roanoke has his brief handwritten biography. The Virginia Historical Society has a letter dated January 19, 1863, that Pulliam wrote to his aunt, Eliza M. Jackson in Columbia. He was survived by his son, and a distant relative at the time, Willis C. Pulliam represented Chesterfield and Powhatan Counties and the city of Manchester, Virginia (before its annexation by Richmond).
