= John Hampden Chamberlayne =

American politician and publisher (1838–1882)

Member of the Virginia House of Delegates from the Richmond district
- In office 1879–1880 Serving with William Lovenstein

Personal details
- Born: June 2, 1838 Richmond, Virginia, U.S.
- Died: February 18, 1882 (aged 43) Richmond, Virginia, U.S.
- Party: Funder
- Spouse: Mary Gibson
- Relations: George William Bagby (brother-in-law); William Byrd II
- Children: 6
- Education: University of Virginia (MA)
- Occupation: Politician; newspaper publisher
- Military career
- Allegiance: Confederate States
- Service years: 1861–1865
- Rank: Captain
- Units: 21st Virginia Infantry Regiment; Purcell Artillery
- Conflicts: American Civil War; Siege of Petersburg; Battle of the Crater

John Hampden Chamberlayne (June 2, 1838 – February 18, 1882) was an American politician and newspaper publisher from Virginia. He served in the Virginia House of Delegates from 1879 to 1880.

== Early life ==
John Hampden Chamberlayne was born on June 2, 1838, in Richmond, Virginia, to Martha Burwell (née Dabney) and Lewis W. Chamberlayne. He was descended from William Byrd II. He studied at home and at Hanover Academy under Lewis Minor Coleman. He graduated from the University of Virginia with a Master of Arts in 1858. He was admitted to the bar in Richmond in 1859.

== Career ==
On April 17, 1861, Chamberlayne volunteered for the Confederate Army as a private in Company F of the 21st Virginia Infantry Regiment. He later joined the Purcell Artillery and became sergeant and later adjutant of the battalion. He was promoted to lieutenant on Reuben Lindsay Walker's staff. He attained the rank of captain, commanding a light field battery. He was wounded during the war. He was taken prisoner in May 1864. He was promoted following his taking of command of a battery during the Battle of the Crater at the Siege of Petersburg. The battery afterward was named in his honor. Following the surrender of Lee, he left for Mississippi on horseback. Following the war, he moved to Green Springs, Louisa County, Virginia. For eighteen months, he lived in poverty and attempted farming, but was unsuccessful. This led to a physical and nervous breakdown in the spring of 1867 that left him incapacitated for a year. In May 1868, he worked a clerical position with the Virginia and Tennessee Railroad in Central Depot (now Radford).

In December 1868 or early 1869, he moved to Petersburg and became editor of the Petersburg Index, succeeding William E. Cameron. He was editor there until 1873. In 1873, he became editor of the Norfolk Virginian and remained with that paper until 1876. After moving to Norfolk, he assisted John Goode in two of his political campaigns. In March 1876, he founded Richmond State, a paper published in the South. He was associated with the Funder Party. He served one term in the Virginia House of Delegates from 1879 to 1880, representing Richmond. He did not seek re-election. He was a member of the original managing committee of the Petersburg Club.

== Personal life ==
Chamberlayne married Mary Gibson, daughter of Dr. Churchill J. Gibson, of Petersburg. They had six children. His sister Mary Parke married writer George William Bagby. He had the nickname "Ham".

Chamberlayne died of pneumonia on February 18, 1882, at his home on Grace Street in Richmond.

== Legacy ==
His son Churchill published Chamberlayne's Civil War letters in a book titled "Ham Chamberlayne-Virginian" in 1932.
