= Enulius oligostichus =

Conservation status
- Data Deficient (IUCN 3.1)

Scientific classification
- Domain: Eukaryota
- Kingdom: Animalia
- Phylum: Chordata
- Class: Reptilia
- Order: Squamata
- Suborder: Serpentes
- Family: Colubridae
- Genus: Enulius
- Species: E. oligostichus

Binomial name
- Enulius oligostichus H.M. Smith, Arndt, & Sherbrook, 1967

Species of snake

Enulius bifoveatus, the Mexican longtail snake, is a species of snake of the family Colubridae. The species is found in Mexico.
