= Enulius flavitorques =

Conservation status
- Least Concern (IUCN 3.1)

Scientific classification
- Domain: Eukaryota
- Kingdom: Animalia
- Phylum: Chordata
- Class: Reptilia
- Order: Squamata
- Suborder: Serpentes
- Family: Colubridae
- Genus: Enulius
- Species: E. flavitorques

Binomial name
- Enulius flavitorques (Cope, 1868)

Species of snake

Enulius flavitorques, the Pacific longtail snake, is a species of snake of the family Colubridae. The species is found in Mexico, Guatemala, Honduras, El Salvador, Nicaragua, Costa Rica, Panama, Venezuela, and Colombia.
