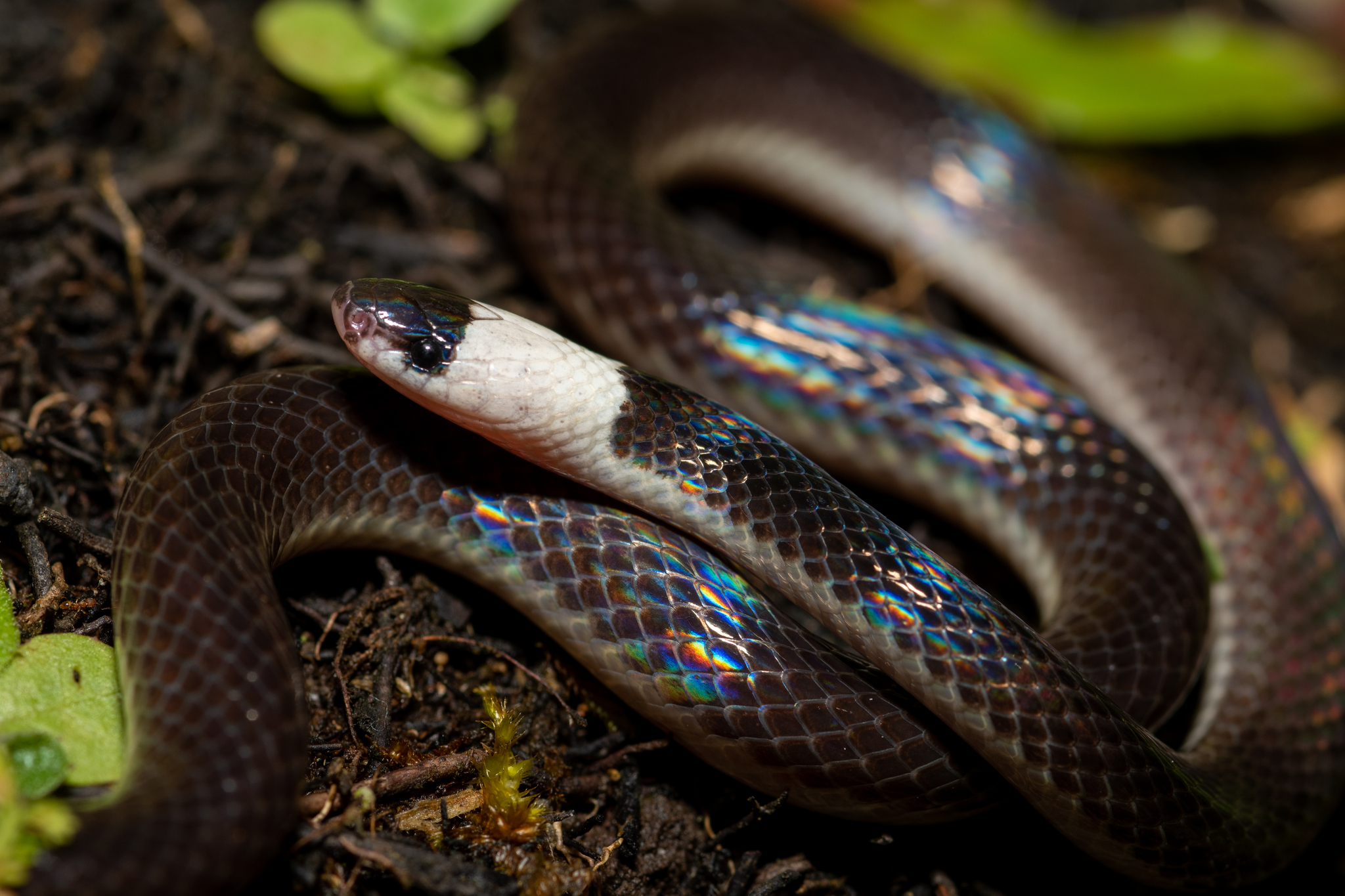

Conservation status
- Least Concern (IUCN 3.1)

Scientific classification
- Kingdom: Animalia
- Phylum: Chordata
- Class: Reptilia
- Order: Squamata
- Suborder: Serpentes
- Family: Colubridae
- Genus: Enuliophis; McCranie & Villa, 1993
- Species: E. sclateri

Binomial name
- Enuliophis sclateri (Boulenger, 1894)

Synonyms
- Leptocalamus sclateri Boulenger, 1894; Enulius sclateri — Taylor, 1954; Enuliophis sclateri — McCranie & Villa, 1993

= Colombian longtail snake =

Species of snake

The Colombian longtail snake (Enuliophis sclateri), also known commonly as the sock-headed snake and the white-headed snake, is a species of snake in the family Colubridae. The species is native to the humid forests of Central America and northern South America.

== Taxonomy and etymology ==
The species was first described by George Albert Boulenger in 1894 under the name Leptocalamus sciateri. The species was later placed in Enulius, and remained there until 1993, when James R. McCranie and Jaime Villa designated the species as the sole member of the new genus Enuliophis, which as of 2026 remains monotypic.

The name Enuliophis is derived from the Greek words hen (one), oule (scar or mark) and ophis (snake), and is allusion to the genus Enulius, the species of which, according to James R. McCranie, Enuliophis sciateri shares a resemblance with.

The specific name, sclateri, is in honor of British zoologist Philip Lutley Sclater, who donated the holotype to the British Museum (Natural History), where Boulenger worked.

== Distribution and habitat ==
E. sclateri can be found in the humid forests of Honduras, Nicaragua, Costa Rica, Panama, and Colombia, at elevations ranging from sea level to 1,640 m (5,380 ft).

== Description and behaviour ==
E. sclateri can reach lengths of 55–70 cm (22–28 in), and has a long, thick tail that makes up 37–42% of the total length of the snake. The snake's belly is pale grey while its back is sleet grey to black or blue-black, with the dark colouration being broken up by a white or pale yellow collar. The snake has 129–151 ventral scales and 96–103 subcaudal scales.

E. sclateri is known to exhibit both diurnality and nocturnality.

== Reproduction ==
E. sclateri is oviparous.
