= George Wither =

English poet, pamphleteer, satirist and writer (1588-1667)

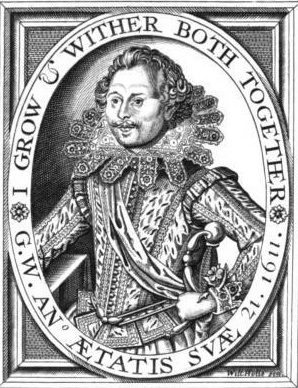
- George Wither
- Born: 11 June 1588 O.S. Bentworth, Hampshire
- Died: 2 May 1667 (aged 78) O.S. London
- Occupation: Poet
- Writing career
- Genre: Satire
- Notable works: Abuses Stript and Whipt, The Shepheard's Hunting

George Wither (11 June 1588 O.S. (21 June 1588 NS) – 2 May 1667 O.S. (12 May 1667 NS)) was a prolific English poet, pamphleteer, satirist, and writer of hymns. Wither's life spanned one of the most tumultuous periods in the history of England, during the reigns of Elizabeth I, James I, and Charles I, the Civil War, the Parliamentary period, and the Restoration period.

== Biography ==
=== Early life ===
Wither was born in Bentworth, near Alton, in the heart of Hampshire, the son of George Wither Senior and his wife, Mary. His grandfather, Richard Wither, lived at Manydown in Wootton St Lawrence, where the family had resided since at least 1344. His early schooling took place under Rev. John Greaves, the father of John, Sir Edward and Thomas Greaves. Between the ages of fifteen and seventeen, he studied at Magdalen College, Oxford. Despite his neighbours' advice that his father put him to some mechanic trade, Wither was sent to one of the Inns of Chancery, eventually obtaining an introduction at Court.

It is thought that Wither spent some time in Ireland, perhaps with Adam Loftus at Rathfarnham Castle. He wrote what amounted to a masque for a wedding that took place there in 1610, of the parents of Francis Willughby.

Wither wrote a 1612 elegy on the death of Henry Frederick, Prince of Wales, and a 1613 volume of congratulatory poems on the marriage of the princess Elizabeth.

=== Imprisonment and release ===
Some time between 1611 and 1613, Wither wrote Abuses Stript and Whipt, twenty satires directed against the concepts of revenge, ambition, and lust. These satires, aimed at exposing "th'abuses of these wicked Times", achieved some popular success and had seven printings from 1613 to 1617. The volume included a poem called "The Scourge", in which the Lord Chancellor was attacked, and a series of epigrams. Despite the fact that the satires referenced nobody by name and that Wither had published them a year before with no trouble, he was arrested for libel "on or about 20 March 1614" and held in the Marshalsea prison for four months before being released.

In A Satyre: Dedicated to His Most Excellent Majestie, Wither made a bold appeal to King James for his release, claiming that he had "not sought to scandalize the state, nor sowne sedition." The cause for his initial imprisonment is somewhat unclear, as the Abuses were very general and had not satirized anyone by name.

Charles Lamb commented:

that a man should be convicted of libel when he named no names but Hate, and Envy, and Lust, and Avarice, is like one of the indictments in the Pilgrim's Progress, where Faithful is arraigned for having 'railed on our noble Prince Beelzebub, and spoken contemptibly of his honourable friends, the Lord Old Man, the Lord Carnal Delight, and the Lord Luxurious'.

This view has been held by most later critics and scholars, in addition to the possibility of earlier editions containing text which was erased in later editions. Several scholars in the late 19th and early 20th centuries also claimed that Wither had offended Lord Chancellor Ellesmere with one of the verses in Abuses. This claim, however, was rejected by Allan Pritchard, who argued that it stemmed from a misreading of the verses.

Pritchard makes the case that the reason for Wither's imprisonment was that he angered Henry Howard, 1st Earl of Northampton, by accusing him and others of colluding with the Spanish and Catholic government. Pritchard mentions that Northampton was at the height of his power when Wither was arrested and notes that Wither was not able to secure his release until after Northampton's death in June 1614.

After his release from prison, Wither was admitted, in 1615, to Lincoln's Inn.

In 1621, Wither's satirical Wither's Motto: Nec habeo, nec careo, nec curo (Latin for "I have not, I want not, I care not") sold over 30,000 copies within a few months, according to his own account. Like his earlier invective, it was said to be libellous, and Wither was again imprisoned, but shortly afterwards released without formal trial on the plea that the book had been duly licensed.

Ben Jonson turned satire back on Wither, portrayed as the Chronomastix of the masque Time Vindicated. Wither avenged himself by a reference to Jonson's drunken conclave. He was obliged to print this book with his own hand, as a result of his quarrel with the Stationers Company.

=== Under Charles I ===
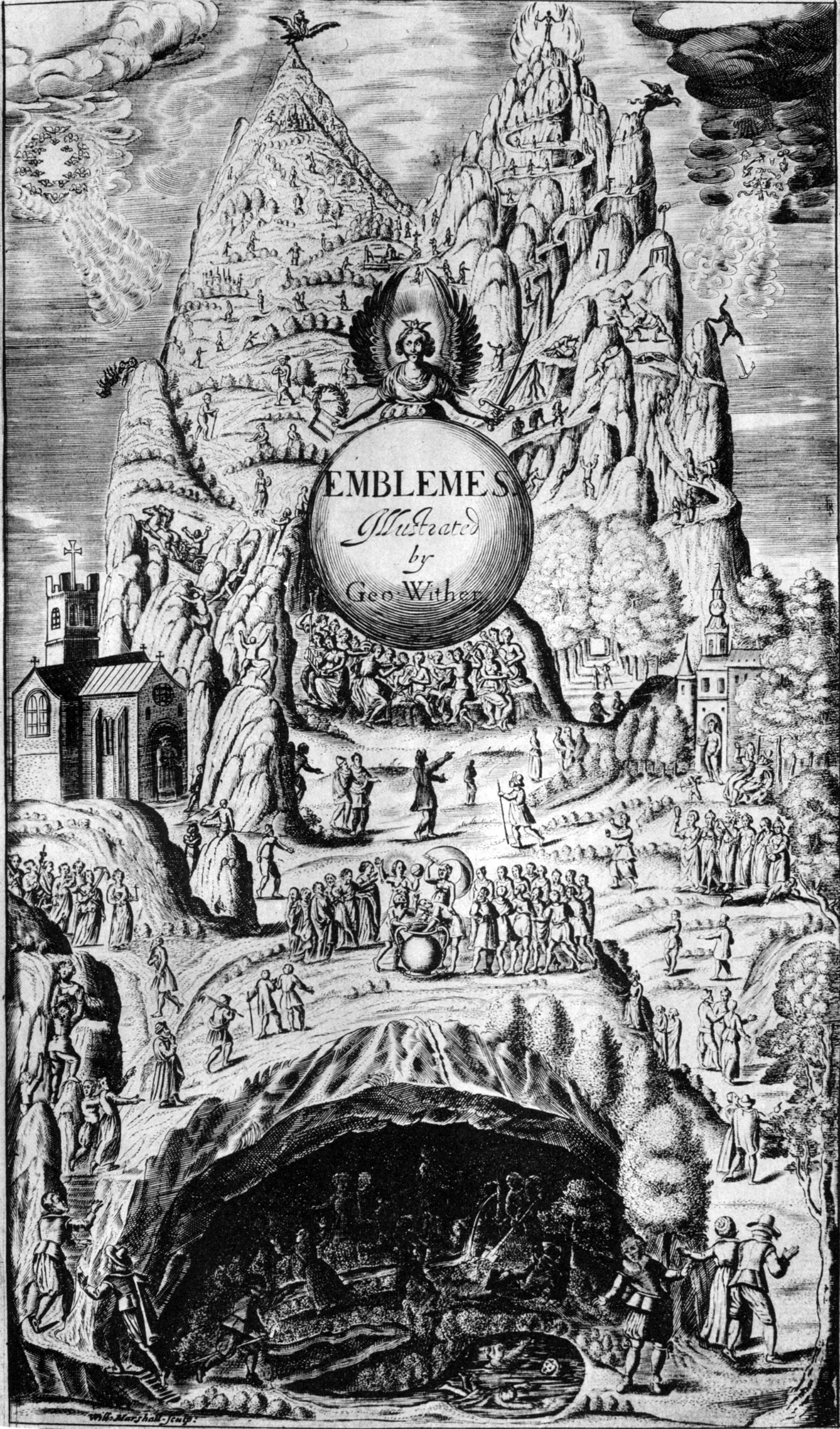
William Marshall's frontispiece to Wither's Emblemes.

Wither was in London during the plague of 1625, and in 1628 published Britain's Remembrancer, a voluminous poem on the subject, interspersed with denunciations of the wickedness of the times and prophecies of the disasters about to fall upon England. It reflects on the nature of poetry and prophecy, explores the fault lines in politics, and rejects tyranny of the sort the king was denounced for fostering.

In 1635, Wither was employed by Henry Taunton, a London publisher, to write English verses illustrative of the allegorical plates of Crispijn van de Passe, originally designed for the emblem book by Gabriel Rollenhagen,"Nucleus emblematum selectissimorum" (1610–1613). The book was published as a Collection of Emblemes, Ancient and Moderne, of which the only perfect copy known is held in the British Museum. In 1636, he translated The Nature of Man by Nemesius.

=== Civil War soldier ===
Wither served as captain of horse in 1639 in the expedition of Charles I against the Scottish Covenanters. His religious convictions explain the fact that, three years after the Scottish expedition, at the outbreak of the English Civil War, he sided with Parliament. He sold his estate to raise a troop of horse, and was placed by a parliamentary committee in command of Farnham Castle. After a few days' occupation, he left the place undefended and marched to London. His own house near Farnham was plundered, and he was captured by a troop of Royalist horse, owing his life to the intervention of Sir John Denham on the ground that so long as Wither lived Denham himself could not be considered the worst poet in England.

A reported episode from 1642 or 1643 has Wither with Henry Marten mocking the coronation regalia. At this time, in any case, Wither's views were converging with those of the advocates of true popular sovereignty, and his political poem Vox Pacifica called for a purge of Parliament.

Wither was promoted to the rank of major. He was present at the 1643 siege of Gloucester and at the 1645 Battle of Naseby. He was deprived in 1643 of his nominal command and commission as justice of the peace because of an attack upon Sir Richard Onslow, who Wither maintained had been responsible for the Farnham disaster. In the same year, Parliament made him a grant of £2000 for the loss of his property, but he apparently never received the full amount, and complained from time to time of his embarrassments and the slight rewards he received for his services. An order was made to settle a yearly income of £150 on Wither, chargeable on Sir John Denham's sequestrated estate, but there is no evidence that he ever received it.

=== Commonwealth and Restoration ===
Wither became a political and religious writer, using verse as his medium. He is considered to stand out as a supporter of the Commonwealth who also proposed a more egalitarian social vision. His Respublica Anglicana (1650) was a reply to the Anarchia Anglicana (1649) of Clement Walker, a Presbyterian opponent of the Independents. It defended engagement, the notion that recognition of the Parliamentary regime should be required.

Wither was a trustee of the Committee for the Sale of the Late King's Goods and was paid £100 in March 1650 for his work making inventories of the former royal palaces. A small place given him by the Protector was forfeited after Wither expressed criticism of Cromwell. He was involved in 11 court cases from 1643 to 1661, including Onslow's libel suit over the poem Justiarius Justificatus. At the Restoration he was arrested, and remained in prison for three years.

Wither was a conforming Anglican, but by the Restoration he had moved closer to the Quakers. In Parallelogrammaton (1662), he compared the Quakers to the prophets Ezekiel and Habakkuk as predecessors.

=== Death ===
Wither died in London on 2 May 1667.

== Works ==
Wither's extant writings number over a hundred, as noted by Thomas Park in Brydges's British Bibliographer. Wither generally wrote in a pure English idiom, and preferred the reputation of "rusticity". According to Alexander Pope's poem The Dunciad, "Withers, Ward, and Gildon rest" together "Safe, where no Critics damn, no duns molest".

=== Pastoral and later satires ===
Wither was known in the pastoral genre. He had figured as one of the interlocutors, Roget, in his friend William Browne's Shepherds Pipe, with which were bound up eclogues by other poets, among them one by Wither. During his imprisonment, Wither wrote what may be regarded as a continuation of Browne's work, The Shepherd's Hunting (printed 1615), eclogues in which the two poets appear as Willie and Roget (in later editions Philarete). It is largely allegorical. The fourth of these eclogues contains a famous passage in praise of poetry; the poets are explicit in their belief that pastoral writing is just a preliminary to other work.

In 1615, the year of his release from prison and admission to Lincoln's Inn, Wither privately printed Fidelia, a love elegy, of which there is a single extant copy held by the Bodleian Library. Other editions of this book, which contained the lyric "Shall I, wasting in despair", appeared in 1617 and 1619.

In 1621, Wither returned to the satiric vein with Wither's Motto: Nec habeo, nec careo, nec curo (Latin for "I have not, I want not, I care not"). It was said to be libellous, and Wither was imprisoned for the second time, but was released shortly afterwards.

In 1622, Wither wrote Faire-Virtue, The Mistresse of Phil Arete, a long panegyric of a mistress, partly real, partly allegorical, written chiefly in seven-syllable verse.

=== Psalmody and hymnody ===
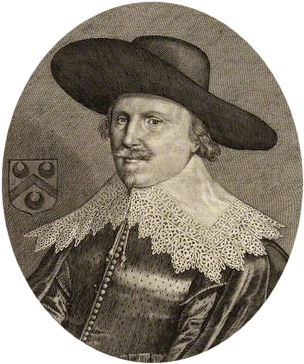
Wither in the 1630s

Wither began as a moderate in politics and religion, but his Puritan leanings became more pronounced as he moved from an Arminian to a more Calvinist position. His later work consists of religious poetry and controversial political tracts. From 1614 he began to work on a new Psalms translation, a project aligned with Sir Edwin Sandys' circle, which Wither frequented.

Wither's Preparation to the Psalter (1619) was an early work in English on literary aspects of the Bible, and initiated a campaign by Wither to substitute his own writings for the dominant Psalms.

Wither's Hymnes and Songs of the Church (1622–1623) were aimed to counter exclusive psalmody, represented by the Sternhold and Hopkins Psalter. Orlando Gibbons provided tunes for some of them. They were issued under a patent of King James I ordaining that they should be bound up with every copy of the authorized metrical psalms offered for sale. This patent was opposed as inconsistent with their privilege to print the singing psalms, by the Stationers Company, to Wither's great mortification and loss, and a second similar patent was disallowed by the House of Lords. Wither defended himself in The Schollers Purgatory (1624). In this document, a 140-page diatribe against the Stationers Company for their refusal to print his work, Wither blames them for his financial ruin and hardship.

Some more of Wither's religious poetry is contained in Heleluiah: or Britain's Second Remembrancer, which was printed in Holland in 1641. This work assumed the knowledge of metrical psalms. Besides hymns, the book contains songs, especially the Cradle Song, Part 1 No. 50 ("Sleep, baby, sleep, what ails my dear"), the Anniversary Marriage Song, Part 2 No. 17 ("Lord, living here are we"), the Perambulation Song, Part 2 No. 24 ("Lord, it hath pleased Thee to say"), the Song for Lovers, Part 3 No. 20 ("Come, sweet heart, come, let us prove"), the Song for the Happily Married, Part 3 No. 21 ("Since they in singing take delight"), and the Song for a Shepherd, Part 3 No. 41 ("Renowned men their herds to keep").

=== Context and poetic reputation ===
Wither has been classed as a Spenserian along with Michael Drayton, Giles Fletcher, Phineas Fletcher, and Henry More. The early Jacobean Spenserians were generally republican rather than imperial, of the "country party" rather than the "court party", nostalgic for Elizabeth I, and in favour of the older ornateness rather than the plain style of James I. However, Wither himself is described by Joan Grundy as adopting a deliberate plainness of style.

According to historian Christopher Hill:

... we can trace a line from Spenser ... through a group of poets ... ranging from Shakespeare, Drayton, the two Fletchers, William Browne and Samuel Daniel to George Wither.

Or again:

A line of poets could be traced from Sidney and Spenser through Sylvester and Browne to Wither— not, admittedly, of a rising quality, but of a consistent political attitude.

While Hill identifies connections via aristocratic patrons and politics, Alastair Fowler takes Drayton to be the poetic centre of a group that besides Wither would have comprised Browne, John Davies of Hereford, William Drummond of Hawthornden, George Sandys, and Josuah Sylvester.

From roughly 1640 onwards, Wither assumed an overtly prophetic voice. His wide range of publication, in prose as well as various poetic genres over nearly half a century, has left a very uneven impression of his interests and affected his poetic reputation. George Gilfillan wrote that "Wither was a man of real genius, but seems to have been partially insane". Herbert Grierson found something to praise in Wither's early love poems, but spoke of "endless diffuse didactic and pious poems, if they can be called poems". C. V. Wedgwood wrote that "every so often in the barren acres of his verse is a stretch enlivened by real wit and observation, or fired with a sudden intensity of feeling".

=== Later publication ===
After a period of neglect, George Ellis anthologised Wither in Specimens of the Early English Poets (1790). Samuel Egerton Brydges published The Shepherds Hunting (1814), Fidelia (1815) and Fair Virtue (1818), and a selection appeared in Ezekiel Sanford's Works of the British Poets, vol. v. (1819).

Most of Wither's works were edited in twenty volumes for the Spenser Society (1871–82); a selection was included by Henry Morley in his Companion Poets (1891), Fidelia and Fair Virtue are included in Edward Arber's English Garner (vol. iv, 1882; vol. vi, 1883), and The Poetry of George Wither was edited by Frank Sidgwick in 1902.

A selection of Wither's hymns was published in 2011 by The Phoenix Press in The Gibbons Songbook. While primarily a realisation of the tunes Orlando Gibbons wrote for The Hymns and Songs of the Church, a selection of verses from the hymns is paired with the original verses from the King James Bible that inspired Wither to create the hymns.
