= Philip Sclater =

English zoologist and lawyer (1829–1913)

Philip Lutley Sclater
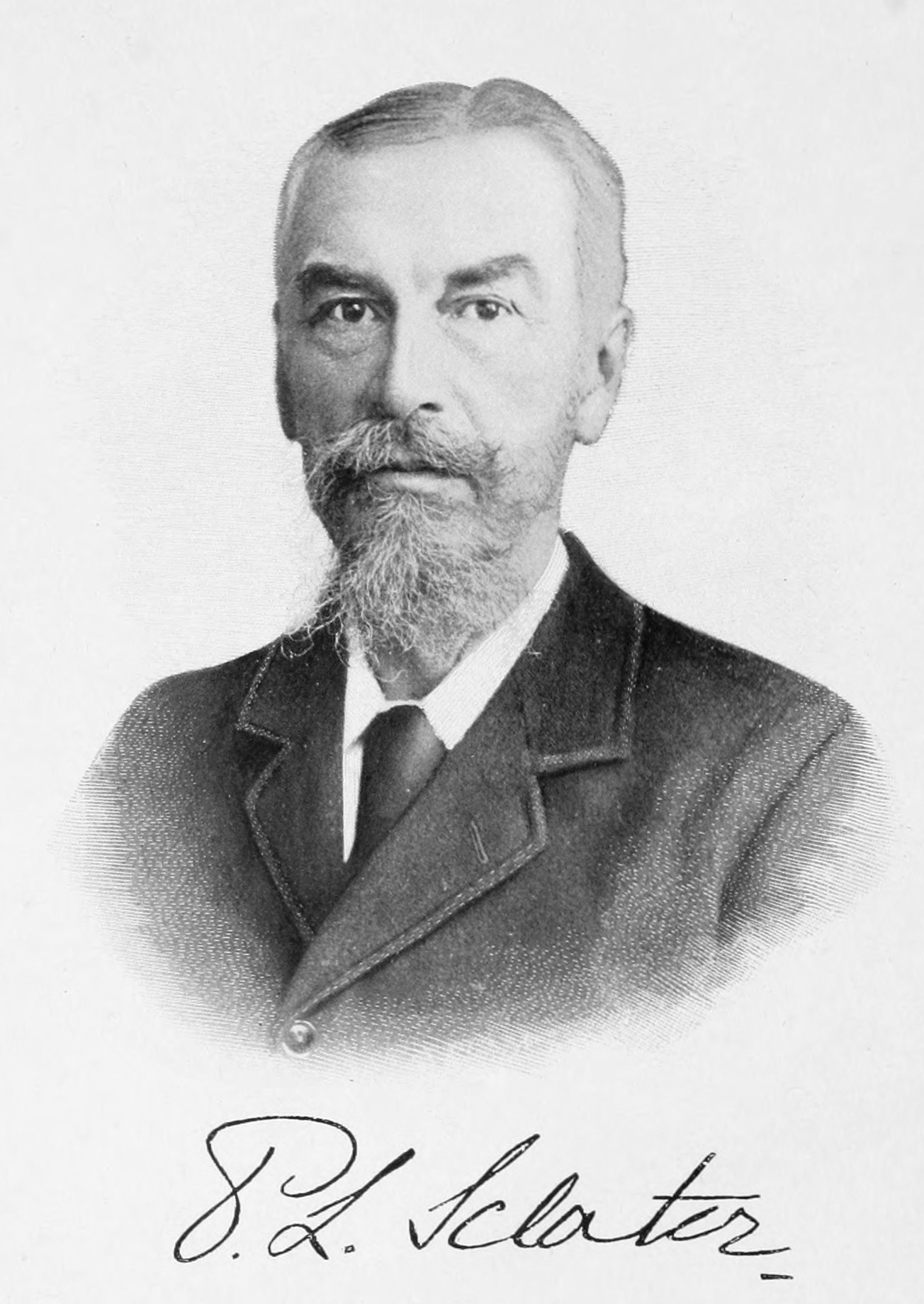
- Philip Lutley Sclater
- Born: 4 November 1829; Tangier Park, Wootton St Lawrence, Hampshire
- Died: 27 June 1913 (aged 83); Odiham, Hampshire
- Education: Winchester College; Corpus Christi College, Oxford
- Occupations: Lawyer, zoologist
- Children: William Lutley Sclater Jnr.
- Parent: William Lutley Sclater
- Scientific career
- Author abbrev. (zoology): P. L. Sclater

Philip Lutley Sclater FRS FRGS FZS FLS (4 November 1829 – 27 June 1913) was an English lawyer and zoologist. In zoology, he was an expert ornithologist, and identified the main zoogeographic regions of the world. He was Secretary of the Zoological Society of London for 42 years, from 1860 to 1902.

== Early life ==
Sclater was born at Tangier Park, in Wootton St Lawrence, Hampshire, where his father William Lutley Sclater had a country house. George Sclater-Booth, 1st Baron Basing was Philip's elder brother. Philip grew up at Hoddington House where he took an early interest in birds. He was educated in school at Twyford and at thirteen went to Winchester College and later Corpus Christi College, Oxford where he studied scientific ornithology under Hugh Edwin Strickland.

In 1851, Sclater began to study law and was admitted a Fellow of Corpus Christi College. In 1856 he travelled to America and visited Lake Superior and the upper St. Croix River, canoeing down it to the Mississippi. Sclater wrote about this in "Illustrated travels". In Philadelphia he met Spencer Baird, John Cassin and Joseph Leidy at the Academy of Natural Sciences. After returning to England, he practised law for several years and attended meetings of the Zoological Society of London.

== Career ==
In 1858, Sclater published a paper in the Proceedings of the Linnean Society, setting up six zoological regions which he called the Palaearctic, Aethiopian, Indian, Australasian, Nearctic, and Neotropical. These zoogeographic regions are still in use. He also developed the hypothesis of Lemuria during 1864 to explain zoological coincidences relating Madagascar to India.

In 1874, he became private secretary to his brother George Sclater-Booth, MP (later Lord Basing). He was offered a permanent position in civil service but he declined. In 1875, he became President of the Biological Section of the British Association for the Advancement of Science, which he joined in 1847 as a member. He was elected as a member to the American Philosophical Society in 1873.

Sclater was the founder and first editor of The Ibis, the journal of the British Ornithologists' Union. He was Secretary of the Zoological Society of London from 1860 to 1902. He was briefly succeeded by his son, before the Council of the Society made a long-term appointment.

In 1901, he described the okapi to western scientists although he never saw one alive. His office at 11 Hanover Square became a meeting place for all naturalists in London. Travellers and residents shared notes with him and he corresponded with thousands.

His collection of birds grew to nine thousand and these he transferred to the British Museum in 1886. At around the same time the museum was augmented by the collections of Gould, Salvin and Godman, Hume, and others to become the largest in the world. Among Sclater's more important books were Exotic Ornithology (1866–69) and Nomenclator Avium (1873), both with Osbert Salvin; Argentine Ornithology (1888–89), with W.H. Hudson; and The Book of Antelopes (1894–1900) with Oldfield Thomas.

In June 1901, he received an honorary doctorate of Science (D.Sc.) from the University of Oxford.

== Family ==
On 16 October 1862, Sclater married Jane Anne Eliza Hunter Blair, daughter of Sir David Hunter-Blair, 3rd Baronet; the couple had a daughter and four sons. Their eldest son, William Lutley Sclater, was also an ornithologist. Their third son, Captain Guy Lutley Sclater, died on 26 November 1914, aged 45, in the accidental explosion that sank HMS Bulwark. Philip Sclater is buried in Odiham Cemetery.

== Animals named after Sclater ==
- Sclater's lemur (Eulemur flavifrons)
- Dusky-billed parrotlet (the name Psittacula sclateri Gray, 1859, is currently viewed as a subspecies of Forpus modestus Cabanis, 1848).
- Sclater's monal (Lopophorus sclateri)
- Erect-crested penguin (Eudyptes sclateri)
- Ecuadorian cacique (Cacicus sclateri)
- Mexican chickadee (Poecile sclateri)
- Bay-vented cotinga (Doliornis sclateri)
- Sclater's antwren (Myrmotherula sclateri)
- Sclater's lark (Spizocorys sclateri)
- Sclater's cassowary (Casuarius sclateri) ... now usually considered conspecific with the Dwarf Cassowary.
- Colombian longtail snake (Enuliophis sclateri)

Although eclipsed by his contemporaries (like Charles Darwin and Alfred Russel Wallace), Sclater may be considered as a precursor of biogeography and even pattern cladistics. For instance he writes in 1858 that "...little or no attention is given to the fact that two or more of these given geographical divisions may have much closer relations to each other than to any third ...".

== Animals named by Sclater ==
- L'Hoest's monkey
- Long-eared jerboa
- Okapi

== Selected publications ==
- Sclater, Philip Lutley (1858). "On the General Geographical Distribution of the Members of the Class Aves". Journal of the Proceedings of the Linnean Society of London. Zoology. 2 (7): 130–136. doi:10.1111/j.1096-3642.1858.tb02549.x.
- —— (1862). Catalogue of a collection of American birds, belonging to Philip Lutley Sclater. London: N. Trubner and Co.
- —— (1862). List of the vertebrated animals living in the gardens of the Zoological Society of London. London: Printed for the Society; etc., etc.
  - 7th edition. Printed for the Society. 1879.
- —— (1864). "The Mammals of Madagascar". Quarterly Journal of Science. 1: 213–219.
- Report on the birds collected during the voyage of H. M. S. Challenger in the years 1873–1876. Report on the scientific results of the voyage of H.M.S. Challenger during the years 1873–76. Zoology; pt. 8. Printed for H.M.S.O. and sold by Longmans. 1880.
- Monograph on the jacamars and puff-birds. 1882.
- Argentine ornithology. A descriptive catalogue of the birds of the Argentine Republic. R. H. Porter. (2 vols. 1888–1889)
- The geographical distribution of birds; an address delivered before the Second International Ornithological Congress at Budapest, May 1891. 1891.
- with Oldfield Thomas: The book of antelopes. (4 vols. 1894–1900); volume 4. 1894.
- with William Lutley Sclater: Geography of mammals. K. Paul, Trench, Trübner & co. 1899.

== Notes ==
Preceded by David William Mitchell	Secretary of the Zoological Society of London; 1860–1902	Succeeded by Peter Chalmers Mitchell
