= Wymering =

Suburb of Greater Portsmouth, Hampshire, England

Coordinates: 50.845840°N 1.075120°W

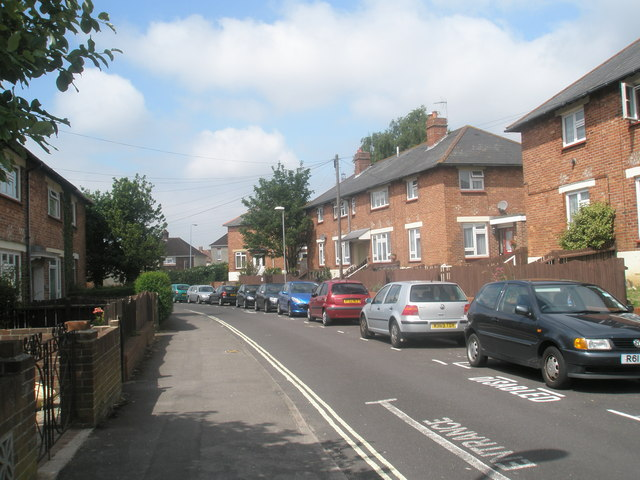
- Maidstone Crescent

- Location within Hampshire
- Unitary authority: Portsmouth
- Ceremonial county: Hampshire
- Region: South East
- Country: England
- Sovereign state: United Kingdom
- Post town: PORTSMOUTH
- Postcode district: PO6
- Dialling code: 023

Wymering is a residential area of the city of Portsmouth, in the ceremonial county of Hampshire, England. Unlike the majority of Portsmouth, it is located on the mainland rather than Portsea Island.

Wymering was one of the estates held by Hampshire's biggest landowner Edward the Confessor immediately before the Norman conquest.

In addition to the mediaeval church, one building that did remain is Wymering Manor. The manor is the oldest building in Portsmouth. It has been a Youth Hostel in its past but is now unoccupied and is reputed to be haunted.

== History ==
Wymering is mentioned in the Domesday Book and was a small village in rural area until it was incorporated into Portsmouth in 1920. On incorporation into Portsmouth a 300-house council housing estate was built there, being completed by 1929.

In 1891 the civil parish had a population of 1123. In 1894 the parish was abolished and merged with Cosham. It is now in the unparished area of Portsmouth, in the Portsmouth district.
