= Wymering Manor =

Building in Portsmouth, England

Coordinates: 50.846°N 1.078°W

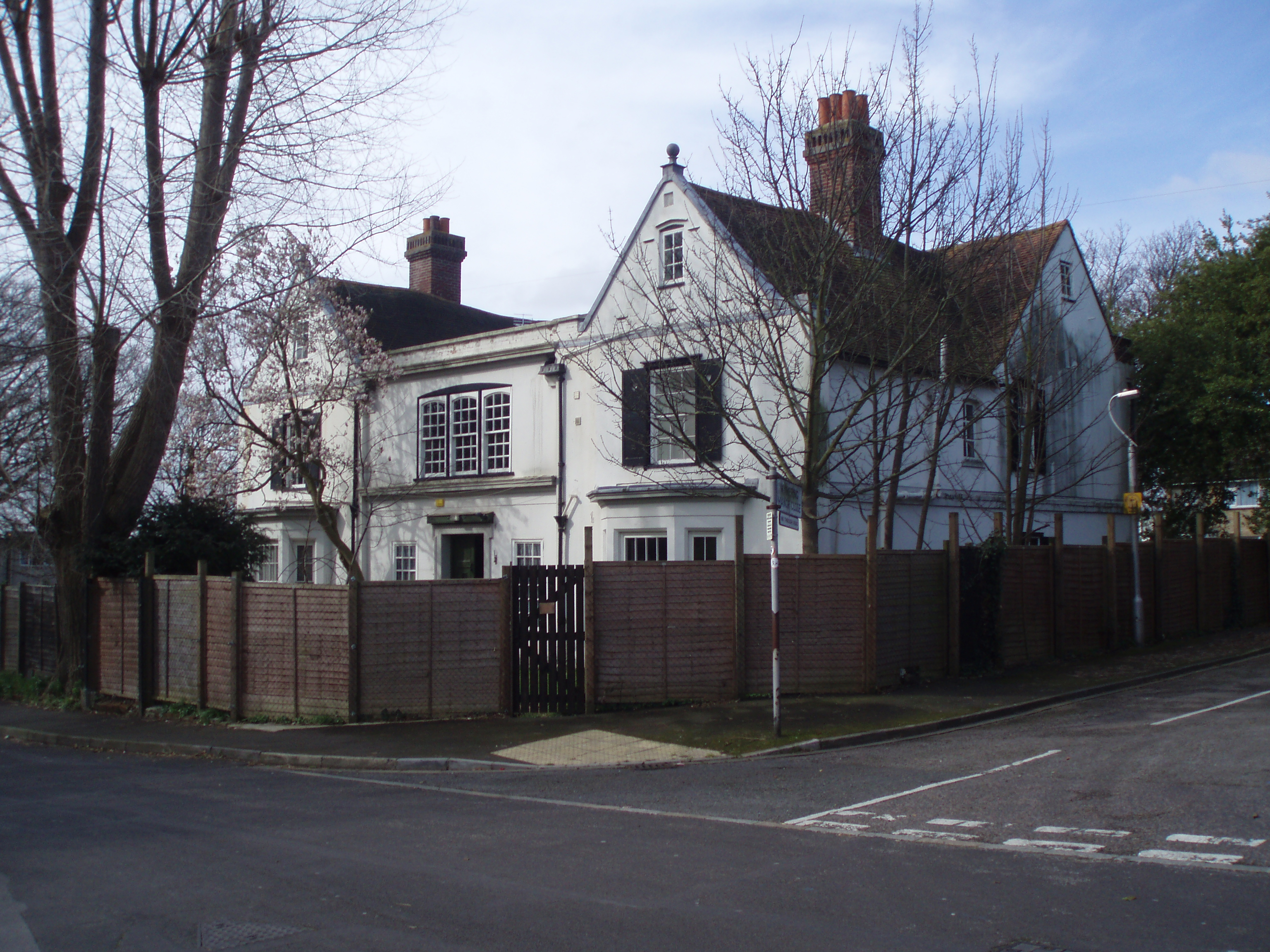
Wymering Manor facade prior to the replacement of the external fence in 2016.

Wymering Manor is a Grade II* listed building, which is the oldest in the city of Portsmouth, England, and was the manor house of Wymering, a settlement mentioned in the Domesday Book of 1086. It is first recorded in 1042, when it was owned by King Edward the Confessor. After the Battle of Hastings it became the property of King William the Conqueror, until 1084.

== History ==
A Roman settlement existed at Wymering from c.43 AD to 408 – a marshy coastline ran close to the present site of Wymering Manor and a Roman outpost camp was likely to have been sited there to defend Portchester Castle.

=== Medieval ===
In Saxon times, c.409, a tribal leader named Wimm lived near the shore of Paulsgrove Lake and may have included the land of Wymering Manor in his village.

The first recorded occupant of Wymering Manor was William Mauduit who probably came across with the invasion of 1066 from his home in Normandy and was involved in local research for the Great Survey of 1086 – known as the Domesday Book. He held other manors in Hampshire and married a Portchester girl named Hawyse in 1069 with whom he had three children.

The history of the manor has been sketched by Mrs. Andrew Davies in her History of Cosham (pub. 1906). At the time of the Domesday Survey (1086) it was held by William the Conqueror in demesne as it had been by King Edward the Confessor, in connection with Portchester Castle.

In the thirteenth century the manor was granted first to Fulkes de Wymering and afterwards to William de Fortibus, and was held of the King by military service at Portchester.

In 1285 Edward I granted the manor to John le Botelier, in whose family it remained for a century; it then passed to the Waytes, from whom it passed in 1570 by marriage to the Brunnings, a well-known Roman Catholic family.

=== 16th and 17th centuries ===
The majority of the current building is 16th century in construction. However, there still exist parts that contain Roman and medieval materials. The cellars are reputedly Saxon in origin. The early origins of the site are supported by archaeology of the area that implies that the area has been inhabited since at least the Roman period.

Inside the manor is a spacious hall which is dominated by twin Jacobean staircases and gallery with barley sugar twist balusters. The panelled walls and pilasters are in building styles associated with the Tudor Elizabethan period. Two priest-holes are also located in the house.

=== 18th century ===
On the death of Edward Bruning, aged 98, in 1707 the manor changed hands several times until in 1761 the Rev. Richard Harris (great-grandson of Warden Harris), Vicar of Wymering and Rector of Wydley, bought a moiety of the manor from Sir Edward Worsley, and in 1768 the rest of the manor from William Smith.

The Rev. Richard Harris died without issue and intestate in 1768, and the manor went to his nephew and heir at law, Lovelace Bigg, who in 1783 added to the property 127 acres (0.51 km^{2}) by purchase from Lord Dormer.

Wymering, which came to the Bigg-Withers on the death in 1768 of Rev. Richard Harris, brother of Jane Harris, who was the mother of Lovelace Bigg, is of special interest to the family as the home of the Rev. Charles Blackstone (Vicar of Wymering 1774–1804) and of Harris Bigg-Wither from his marriage (2nd November 1804) to the death of his father, Lovelace Bigg-Wither, in 1813. Here Harris Bigg-Wither's six elder children were born. The family moved to Manydown in 1833.

=== 19th century ===
In 1835 the old manor house and sixty-eight acres was sold by the Rev. Lovelace Bigg-Wither for £5000 to John Martin, who had long been tenant, and the rest of the property, comprising about 336 acres (1.36 km^{2}) with house, was sold in 1858 to Rev. George Nugee and Mr. Thos. Thistlethwayte for £14,827. 14s. 8d.

The Reverend Nugee made major alterations to the manor, from which he ran a training college for overseas missions, as well as rebuilding Wymering Parish Church opposite, during his residence from 1859 and 1872.

=== 20th century ===
The Manor was purchased by Thomas Knowlys-Parr and his aunt Mrs Nightingale in 1899, who made a number of alterations, including the incorporation of features from Bold Hall near St Helen's in Lancashire, which was demolished in 1900, to complete the conversion of the manor into a country house by 1908. The British Army took possession of the manor following the death of Knowlys-Parr in 1938 for the duration of World War II.

Local builders P.J.A. and G.A. Day purchased the property in 1946 and used several acres of the gardens for the construction of houses and sold on the manor and the remaining land. New owner, Airspeed director and designer, Leonard Metcalfe took up and residence and made further alterations to the building, which was made Grade II listed in 1953, up until his death in 1958.

The Manor was scheduled for demolition to make way for a housing development in 1959. A local campaign resulted in the property being purchased by Portsmouth City Council in 1960, financed by selling off two-acres of the gardens for house construction and leasing of the building to the Youth Hostel Association.

=== 21st century ===
While serving as a YHA hostel, the Manor, which was upgraded to Grade II* listed in 2003, became a favourite of ghost hunters from across the UK. The hostel was eventually closed and the Manor was sold off by the council when the upkeep costs became too much, following the collapse of a timber support in 2006. The Manor was put up for sale by auction in London on 21 September 2010, but failed to meet its reserve price. The Manor was first listed on the Heritage at Risk Register by English Heritage in 2011.

=== The Wymering Manor Trust ===
In January 2013, the council transferred Wymering Manor without charge, along with a start-up grant of £30,000 to help towards the cost of restoration, to The Wymering Manor Trust.

The Trust held the building's first community open day on 5 May 2013, and subsequently received £50,000 from the People's Millions, a collaboration between the Big Lottery Fund and the ITV (TV network). Following a survey in 2014 that unearthed evidence of Deathwatch beetle in the old oak beams, the eventual cost of restoration was estimated at £2.5m. Efforts to raise the money required to restore the building are ongoing.

== Local folklore and legend ==
=== Haunting ===
The manor has been called Hampshire's Most Haunted house, by David Scanlan, founder of the Hampshire Ghost Society, who was responsible for bringing the alleged haunting to the attention of paranormal investigators and the public during his time as manager of the youth hostel there from 2002 to 2006. The Manor's reputation for being haunted was blamed by the press for the property's failure to sell at auction in 2010. although a local chartered surveyor had described it as a unique selling point likely to appeal to developers wanting to turn it into a guest house. Manor trustees have confirmed the value of the Manor's reputation in getting the public interested in the restoration of the building.

The ghosts have played their part in generating interest in the manor. They will always be part of the manor but there is so much more to the house, as we give it a bigger, new life.

— Portsmouth North MP Penny Mordaunt

The reported paranormal activity includes sudden drops in temperature, children whispering, furniture moving and apparitions of more than twenty ghosts.

==== Reckless Roddy ====
During the medieval period, according to local legend, Sir Roderick of Portchester rode to the manor to take advantage of a young bride who had been left alone on her wedding night when her new husband had been called away by an emergency. Unfortunately for Reckless Roddy the husband returned chased him from the house and thrust a sword through him as he attempted to mount his horse. The horse bolted. One night during the Second World War, Leonard Metcalfe stated that he heard a horse gallop down the lane near the manor, and one night in 1960 YHA Warden Mr. E. Jones heard a horse outside the building. The apparitions of Reckless Roddy's ghost are said to occur when a new bride is brought into the house.

==== Bloody Nun ====
The apparition of a nun with bloody hands, sighted at the top of the stairs outside a small attic room known as Noah's Ark, has been linked by paranormal investigators to a local legend that this room was once where babies, possibly the product of illicit relations between monks and nuns, were aborted before being buried in the garden.

== Media appearances ==
The manor was the subject of an episode of the Antix Productions series Most Haunted Live! broadcast on 24 June 2006 as part of its Panic in Portsmouth strand, which also included episodes from Southsea Castle and the Royal Marines Museum.

In January 2017, Wymering Manor featured in Channel 4's The Undateables.

== Gallery ==
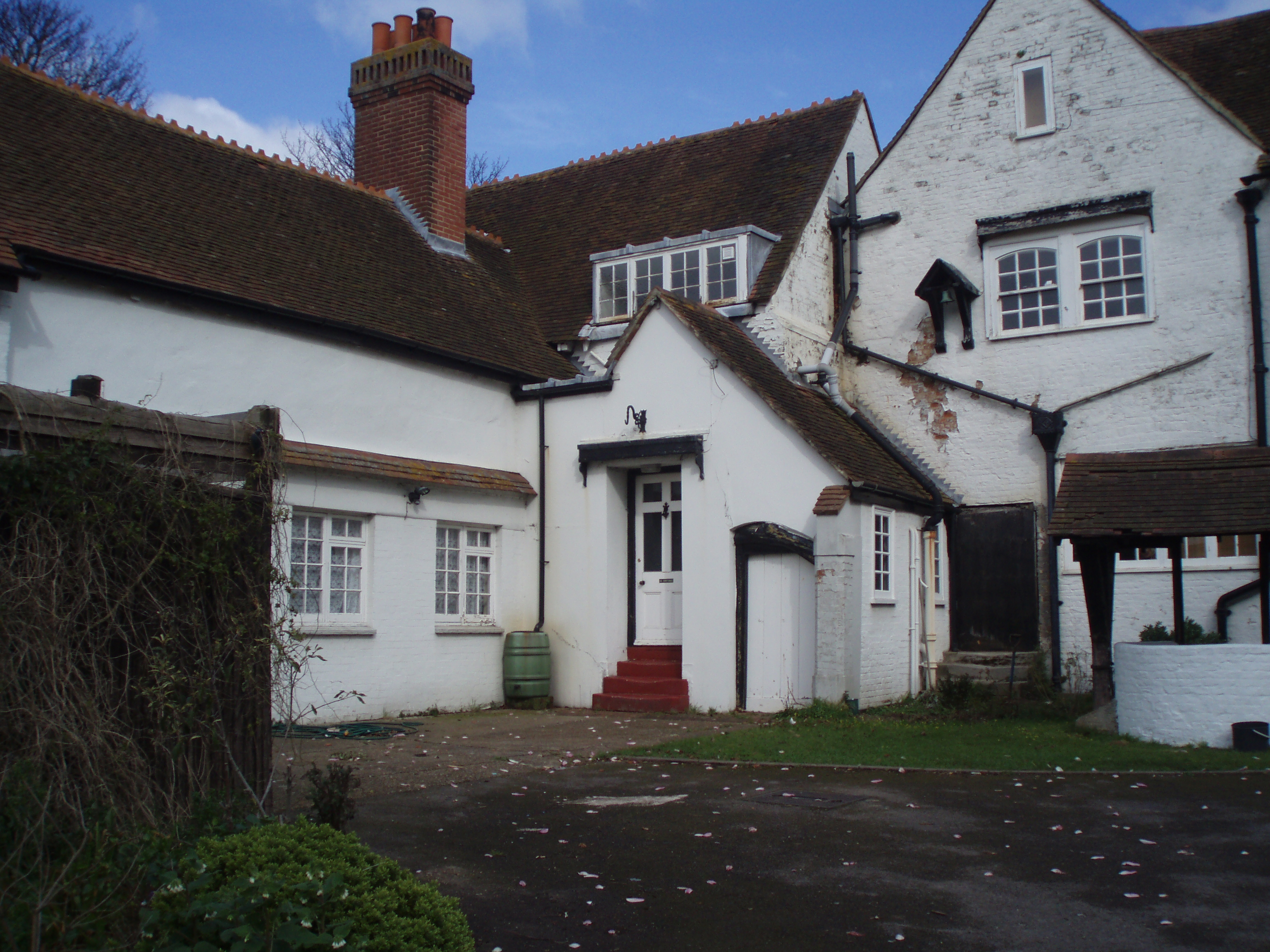

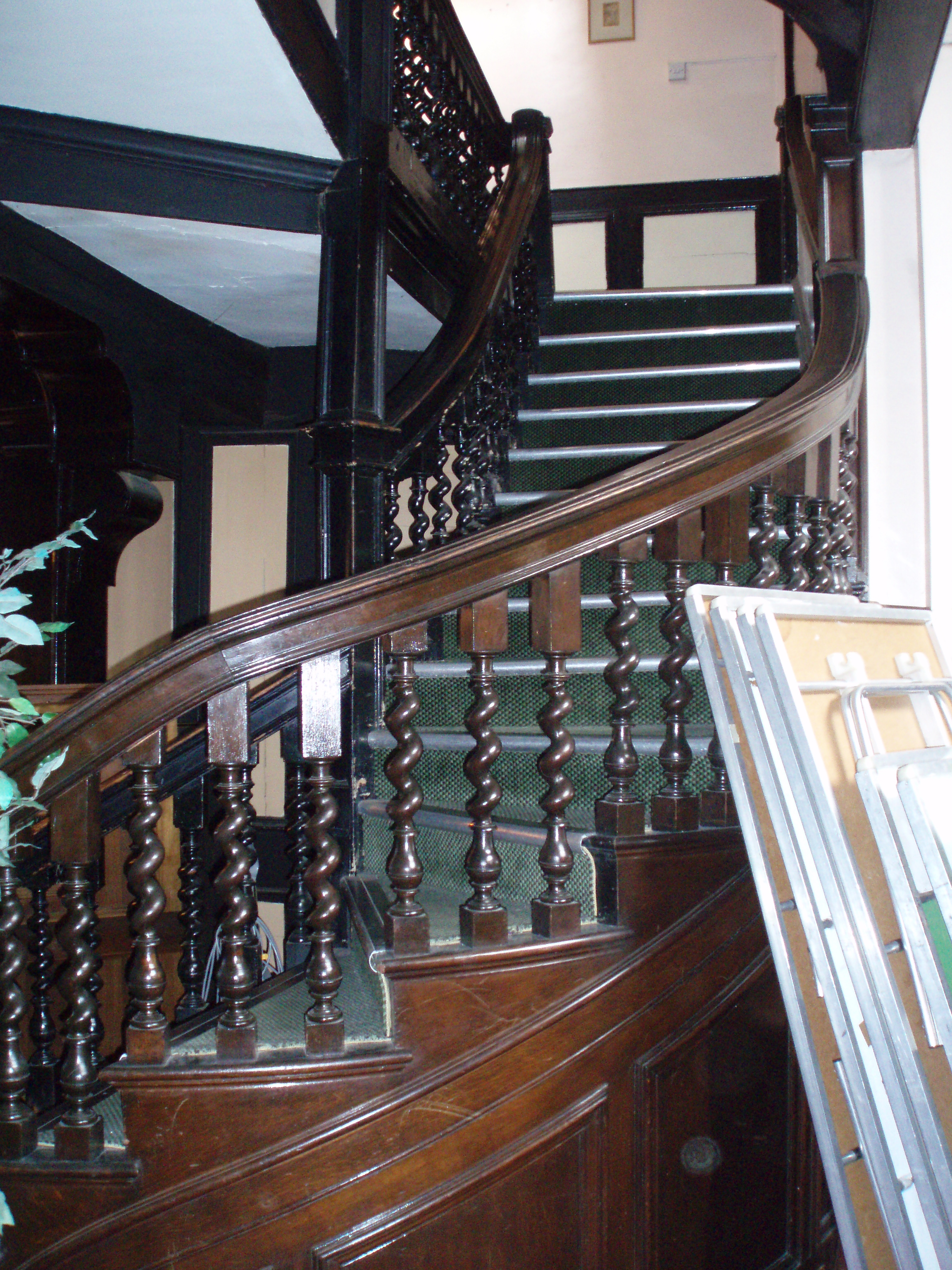

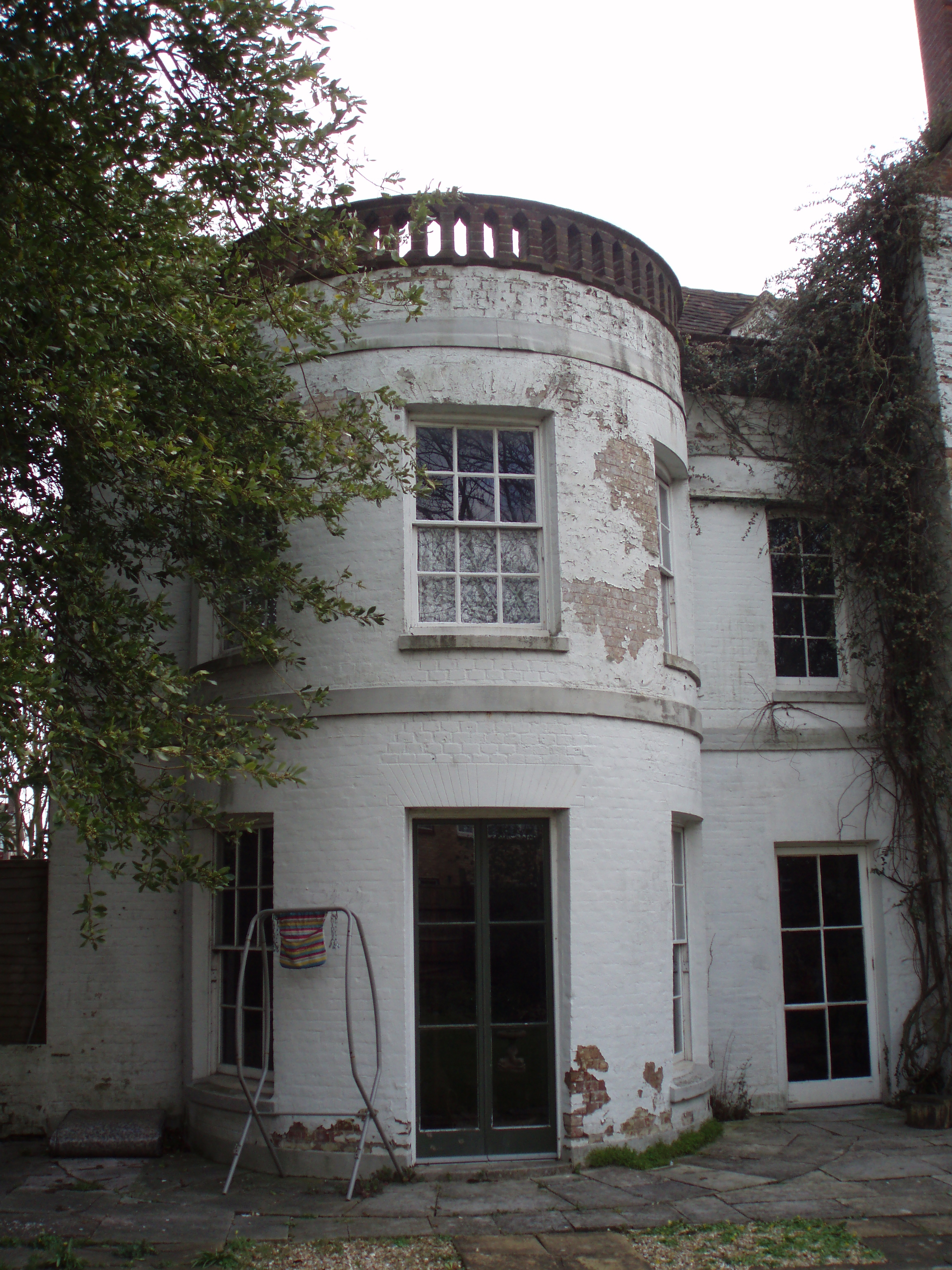
