= Enulius roatanensis =

Conservation status
- Endangered (IUCN 3.1)

Scientific classification
- Kingdom: Animalia
- Phylum: Chordata
- Class: Reptilia
- Order: Squamata
- Suborder: Serpentes
- Family: Colubridae
- Genus: Enulius
- Species: E. roatanensis

Binomial name
- Enulius roatanensis McCranie & G. Köhler, 1999

Species of snake

Enulius roatanensis, the Roatan long-tailed snake, is a species of snake of the family Colubridae. The species is found in Honduras.
