= John L. Hurt =

American politician

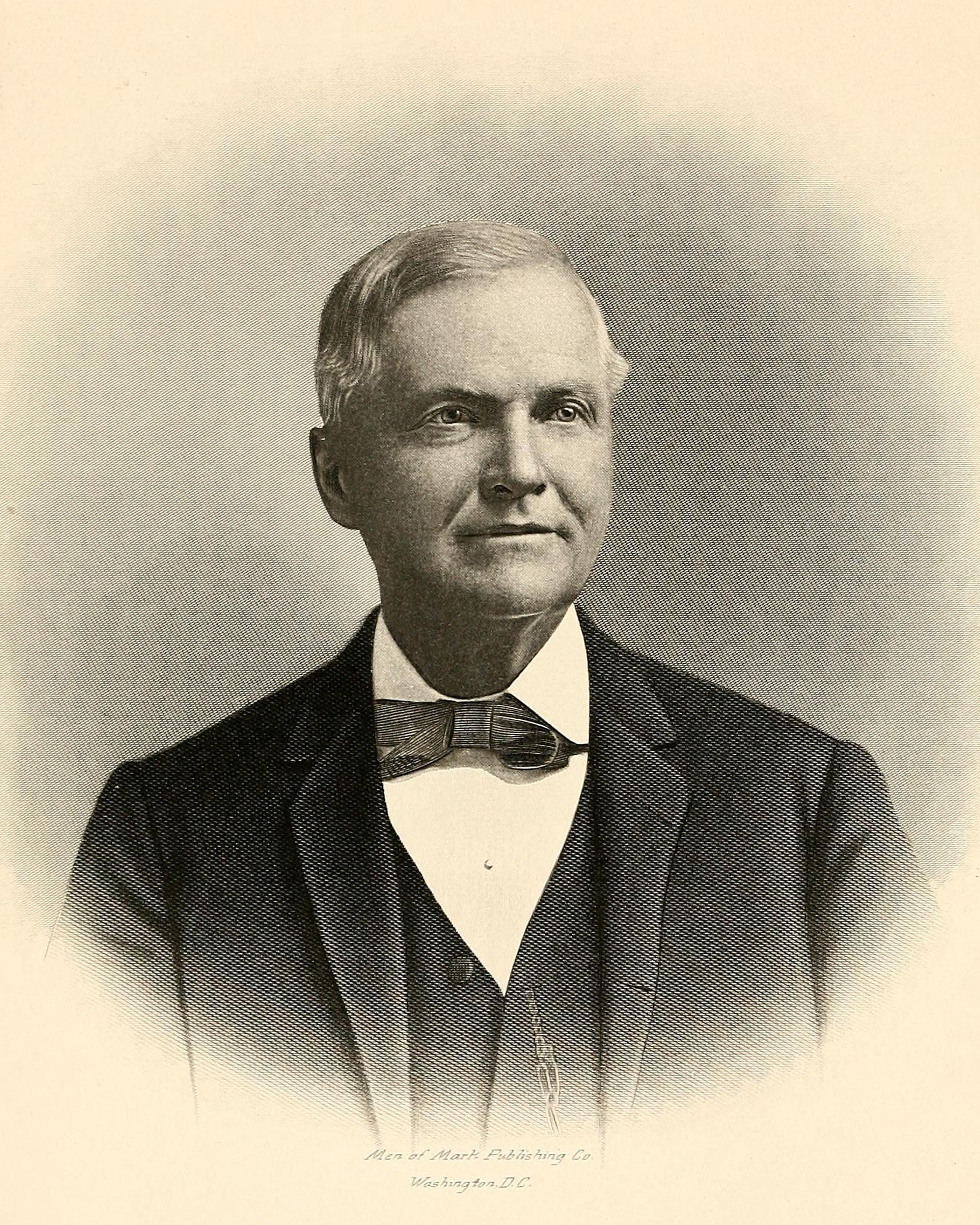

President pro tempore of the Virginia Senate
- In office December 5, 1883 – December 4, 1895
- Preceded by: Henry C. Wood
- Succeeded by: William Lovenstein

Member of the Virginia Senate from the 24th district
- In office December 5, 1877 – December 4, 1895
- Preceded by: William T. Clark
- Succeeded by: Eugene Withers

Personal details
- Born: John Linn Hurt; March 10, 1838 Carroll, Tennessee, U.S.
- Died: September 13, 1931 (aged 93) Richmond, Virginia, U.S.
- Party: Democratic
- Spouse(s): Nannie Clement; Sallie Douglas
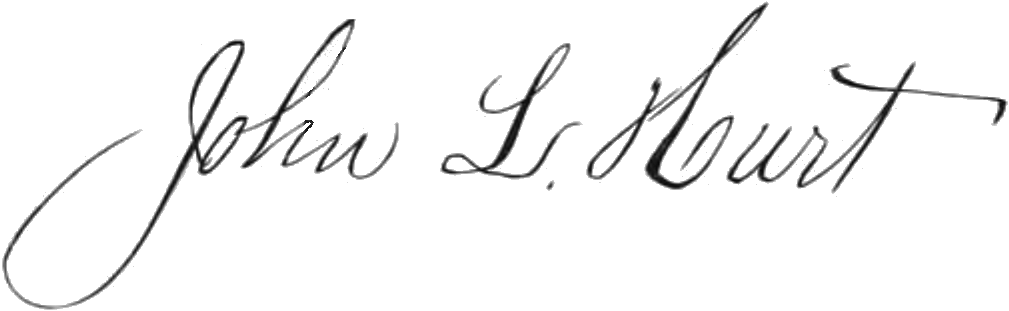
- Signature

Military service
- Allegiance: Confederate States
- Branch/service: Confederate States Army
- Years of service: 1861–1865
- Rank: Major
- Unit: 6th Virginia Cavalry
- Battles/wars: American Civil War

John Linn Hurt (March 10, 1838 – September 13, 1931) was a Democratic politician who served as a member of the Virginia Senate from 1877 until 1895. He was president pro tempore of that body.

Senate of Virginia
| Preceded by William T. Clark | Virginia Senator for the 24th District; 1877–1895 | Succeeded by Eugene Withers |
| Preceded by Henry C. Wood | President pro tempore of the Virginia Senate; 1883–1895 | Succeeded by William Lovenstein |
