= John Withers (burgess) =

Captain John Withers was a justice of Stafford County, Virginia, and member of the Virginia House of Burgesses, 1696-1697. He was born in Arkholme-with-Cawood, Melling-with-Wrayton, Lancaster, Lancashire, England in 1634 and died at St. Paul’s Parish, Stafford County, Virginia c. 1699. Circa 1654, he married Frances, daughter of Colonel Robert Townsend and widow of Francis Dade. John Withers had two daughters: Sarah, who married Christopher Conway and Elizabeth, who married Captain Richard Fossaker.

== See also ==
- Withers (surname)
