= Wither (Passarella novel) =

1999 novel by John Passarella and Joseph Gangemi

- Hardcover edition
- Author: John Passarella and Joseph Gangemi
- Language: English
- Genre: Fiction
- Publisher: Atria
- Publication date: February 1, 1999
- Publication place: United States
- Media type: Print (Hardback)
- Pages: 320 pp (first edition, hardback)
- ISBN: 0671024809 (first edition, hardback)
- Followed by: Wither's Rain

Wither is a 1999 supernatural novel about ghosts and witches by John Passarella and Joseph Gangemi writing under the pseudonym "J.G. Passerella". Wither was nominated for an International Horror Guild Award and won the Horror Writers Association's Bram Stoker Award for First Novel in 1999. Wither was later followed by the sequels Wither's Rain, Wither's Curse, and Wither's Legacy.

== Synopsis ==
Wither follows Wendy, a young college student living in the fictional town of Windale, Massachusetts. She attends local Danfield College, of which her father is the president, while indulging her interest in the magic and New Age. It is an idyllic setting, but evil is slowly creeping into the town in the form of the ghost of Elizabeth Wither. Eight-year-old Abby MacNeil suffers from nightmares that eventually result in her discovering the burial site of three 17th-century women that were tried and killed by the townspeople. Karen Glazer, a local professor, has vivid visions of her unborn child being attacked. Eventually they discover that Wither and her fellow witches are intent on possessing the bodies of Wendy, Abby, and Karen.

== Reception ==
Critical reception for Wither was mixed, with the Cedar Rapids Gazette praising the novel. Publishers Weekly cited the book's setting as a highlight, but commented that the plot was "derivative". Kirkus Reviews gave a mixed review, saying that Passarella "carries off a series of familiar ploys with ease if little originality".

== Movie adaptation ==
In 1997, the authors put the manuscript on the spec market before looking for a book publisher, and Columbia Pictures paid $500,000 (against $1 million total for a finished film) for the manuscript with the intention to film it using indie producers Lisa Henson and Janet Yang at Manifest Films
