= Withers, West Virginia =

Unincorporated community in West Virginia, US

Coordinates: 38°53′59″N 80°57′52″W

Withers is an unincorporated community in Gilmer County, in the U.S. state of West Virginia.

== History ==
A post office called Withers was established in 1903, and remained in operation until 1953. The community was named after John Scott Withers, a local lawyer.
