= Elijah Benton Withers =

American politician and lawyer (1836–1898)

Member of the North Carolina House of Representatives
- In office 1874–1874

Personal details
- Born: December 31, 1836 Caswell County, North Carolina, U.S.
- Died: April 23, 1898 (aged 61) Danville, Virginia, U.S.
- Resting place: Green Hill Cemetery
- Spouse(s): Mary Ann Price (m. 1863; died 1869) Lemma Price (m. 1875)
- Children: 6, including Eugene
- Education: University of North Carolina
- Occupation: Politician; lawyer

Elijah Benton Withers (December 31, 1836 – April 23, 1898) was an American politician and lawyer from North Carolina and Virginia. He served as a member of the North Carolina House of Representatives in 1874.

== Early life ==
Elijah Benton Withers was born on December 31, 1836, at his father's farm in Caswell County, North Carolina, to Mary or Nancy Bethell (née Lawson) and Elijah Keen Withers. He graduated from the University of North Carolina in 1859.

== Career ==
Withers practiced law in Yanceyville, North Carolina, for about two years. He then volunteered in the Yanceyville Grays of the 3rd North Carolina Infantry Regiment and later served with the 13th North Carolina Infantry Regiment of the Confederate States Army during the Civil War. He was later promoted to lieutenant colonel and was injured at the Battle of South Mountain.

Withers served as a member of the North Carolina House of Representatives in 1874. In 1875, he was a delegate at the North Carolina constitutional convention. He was involved in North Carolina politics during the Reconstruction era.

After the war, Withers continued practicing law in Yanceyville. He was associated with Colonel Watt in the firm Watt & Withers. In 1876, Withers moved to Danville, Virginia, and continued practicing law in North Carolina. He was then admitted to the Virginia bar and after his son Eugene graduated, he formed the firm Withers & Withers with him in 1891. He practiced law until his death in 1898.

== Personal life ==
Withers married Mary Ann Price on March 25, 1863. They had two children, Eugene and Daniel Price. His wife died in childbirth in January 1869. Withers married his sister-in-law Lemma Price on December 6, 1875. They had four children, Daniel Price, Mary Stokes, Elijah Benton Jr. and Anna Gertrude.

Withers was a member of the Mount Vernon Church and was a Methodist.

Withers died on April 23, 1898, at his home in Danville. He was buried at Green Hill Cemetery.
