= Eugene Withers =

American politician (1867–1925)

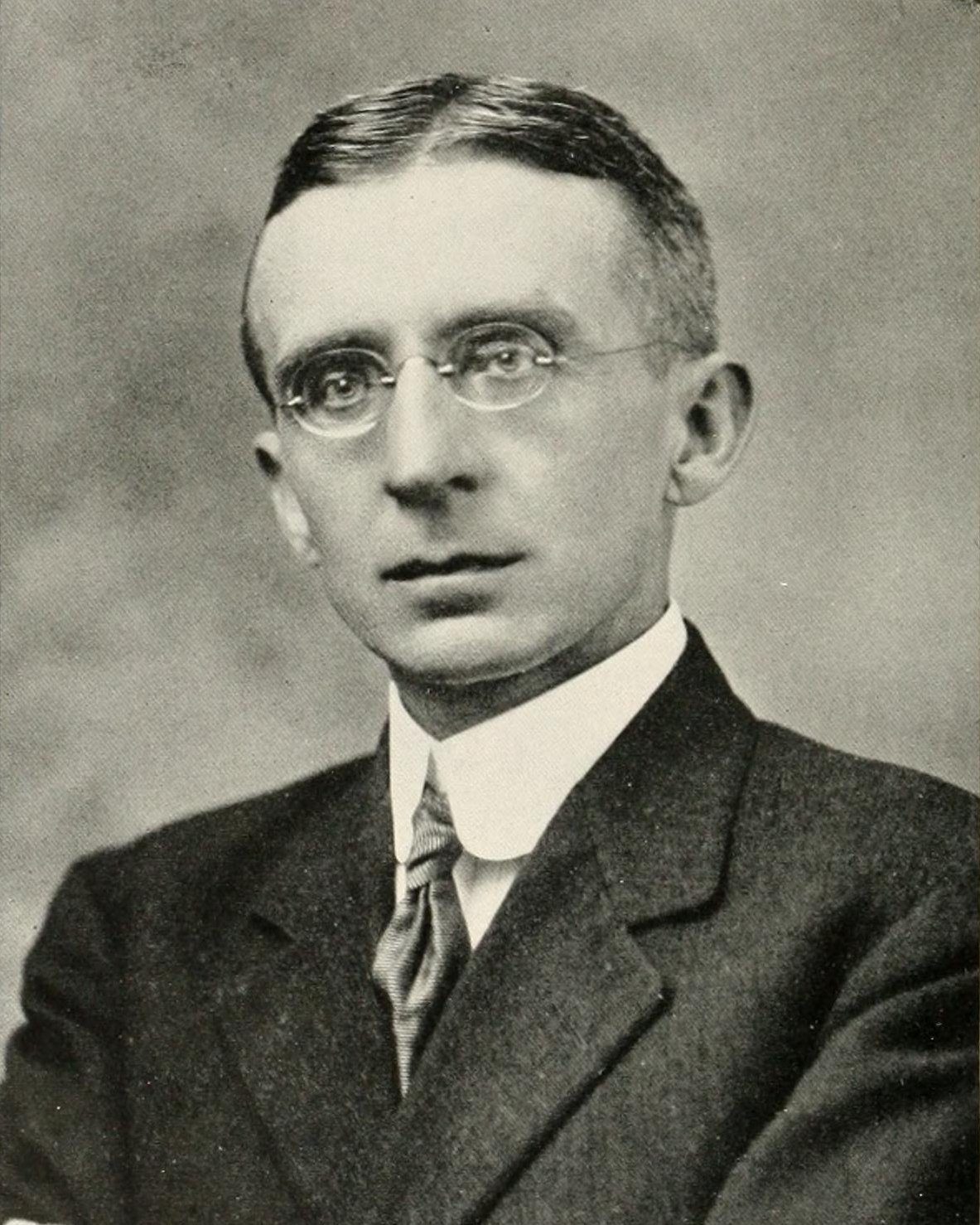
- Withers in 1915 publication

Member of the Virginia Senate from the 24th district
- In office December 4, 1895 – December 6, 1899
- Preceded by: John L. Hurt
- Succeeded by: Joseph Whitehead

Member of the Virginia House of Delegates for Pittsylvania and Danville City
- In office December 6, 1893 – December 4, 1895 Serving with R. I. Anderson, Nathan A. Hall, & J. I. White
- Preceded by: None (seat created)
- Succeeded by: Henry Berger

Personal details
- Born: January 22, 1867 Caswell County, North Carolina, U.S.
- Died: June 1, 1925 (aged 58) Danville, Virginia, U.S.
- Resting place: Green Hill Cemetery
- Party: Democratic
- Spouse: Daisy Hancock (m. 1905)
- Children: 2
- Parent: Elijah Benton Withers (father)
- Education: University of Virginia School of Law
- Alma mater: University of North Carolina (PhB)
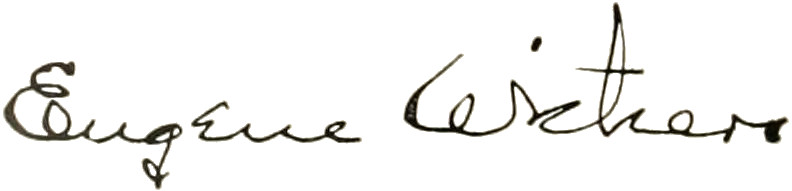
- Signature

Eugene Withers (January 22, 1867 – June 1, 1925) was a lawyer and politician who served in both the Virginia House of Delegates and Virginia Senate, representing Pittsylvania County and Danville.

== Early life ==
Eugene Withers was born on January 22, 1867, on a farm in Caswell County, North Carolina, to Mary Ann (née Price) and Elijah Benton Withers. His father was a lieutenant in the 13th North Carolina Regiment and served as a state senator. His mother died in childbirth in January 1869. Withers and his family moved to Danville, Virginia, when he was nine. Withers studied at private schools in Danville, Virginia. He graduated from the University of North Carolina in 1888 with a Bachelor of Philosophy. He studied law at the University of Virginia School of Law for one term from 1888 to 1889. He then returned to the University of North Carolina from 1889 to 1890. He was admitted to the bar in North Carolina and Virginia in 1890. He was a member of Beta Theta Pi.

== Career ==
Withers started practicing law in Danville in 1891 with his father. Their law firm was Withers and Withers. After the death of his father, the firm became Withers & Green and then later Green, Withers and Green. In 1908, Withers left the firm and practiced alone. He served as city attorney of Danville from 1907 to 1910. Later in life, Withers was a member of the Withers and Brown firm with Judge E. Walton Brown.

Withers was a member of the Democratic Party. Withers served as a member of the Virginia House of Delegates from 1893 to 1894. He then served as a member of the Virginia Senate, representing Danville and Pittsylvania County, from 1895 to 1899. He was a presidential elector for the Democratic ticket in 1900. Withers was a delegate to the Virginia Constitutional Convention of 1902.

== Personal life ==
Withers lived in Danville. He was president of the Tuscarora Club of Danville. Withers married Daisy Hancock of Danville on December 6, 1905. They had two daughters, Margaret and Gertrude.

Withers died on June 1, 1925, at his home at Stonewall Apartment in Danville. He was buried at Green Hill Cemetery.

Senate of Virginia
Preceded by John L. Hurt	Virginia Senator for the 24th District; 1895–1899	Succeeded by Joseph Whitehead
