= Enulius =

Scientific classification
- Kingdom: Animalia
- Phylum: Chordata
- Class: Reptilia
- Order: Squamata
- Suborder: Serpentes
- Family: Colubridae
- Subfamily: Dipsadinae
- Genus: Enulius; Cope, 1870

Genus of snakes

Enulius is a genus of snakes in the family Colubridae. The genus is endemic to the Americas.

== Geographic range ==
Species in the genus Enulius are found in northern Mexico, Central America, and northwestern South America.

== Species and subspecies ==
The following species and subspecies are recognized as being valid.

- Enulius bifoveatus McCranie & G. Köhler, 1999 - Guanaja long-tailed snake
- Enulius flavitorques (Cope, 1868) - Pacific longtail snake
  - Enulius flavitorques flavitorques (Cope, 1868)
  - Enulius flavitorques sumichrasti Bocourt, 1883
  - Enulius flavitorques unicolor (Fischer, 1881)
- Enulius oligostichus H.M. Smith, Arndt & Sherbrook, 1967 - Mexican longtail snake
- Enulius roatanensis McCranie & G. Köhler, 1999 - Roatan long-tailed snake

Nota bene: A binomial authority or trinomial authority in parentheses indicates that the species or subspecies was originally described in a genus other than Enulius.

== Etymology ==
The subspecific name, sumichrasti, is in honor of Swiss-born Mexican naturalist Adrien Jean Louis François de Sumichrast (1828–1882).
