= Manydown =

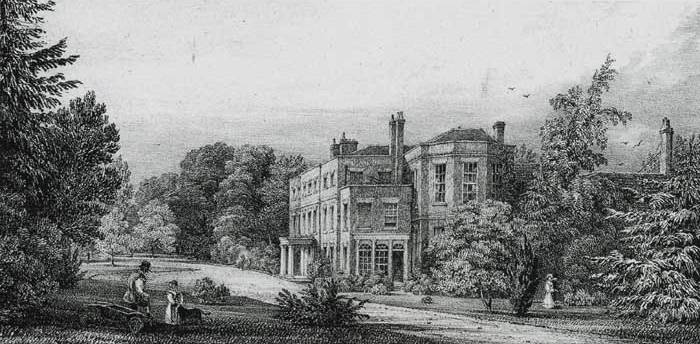
- The great house in 1833

- Location within Hampshire

General information
- Architectural style: Tudor (mostly)
- Location: Wootton St Lawrence, Hampshire, England
- Coordinates: 51.266°N 1.16864°W
- Construction started: 14th century
- Completed: 1790
- Demolished: 1965

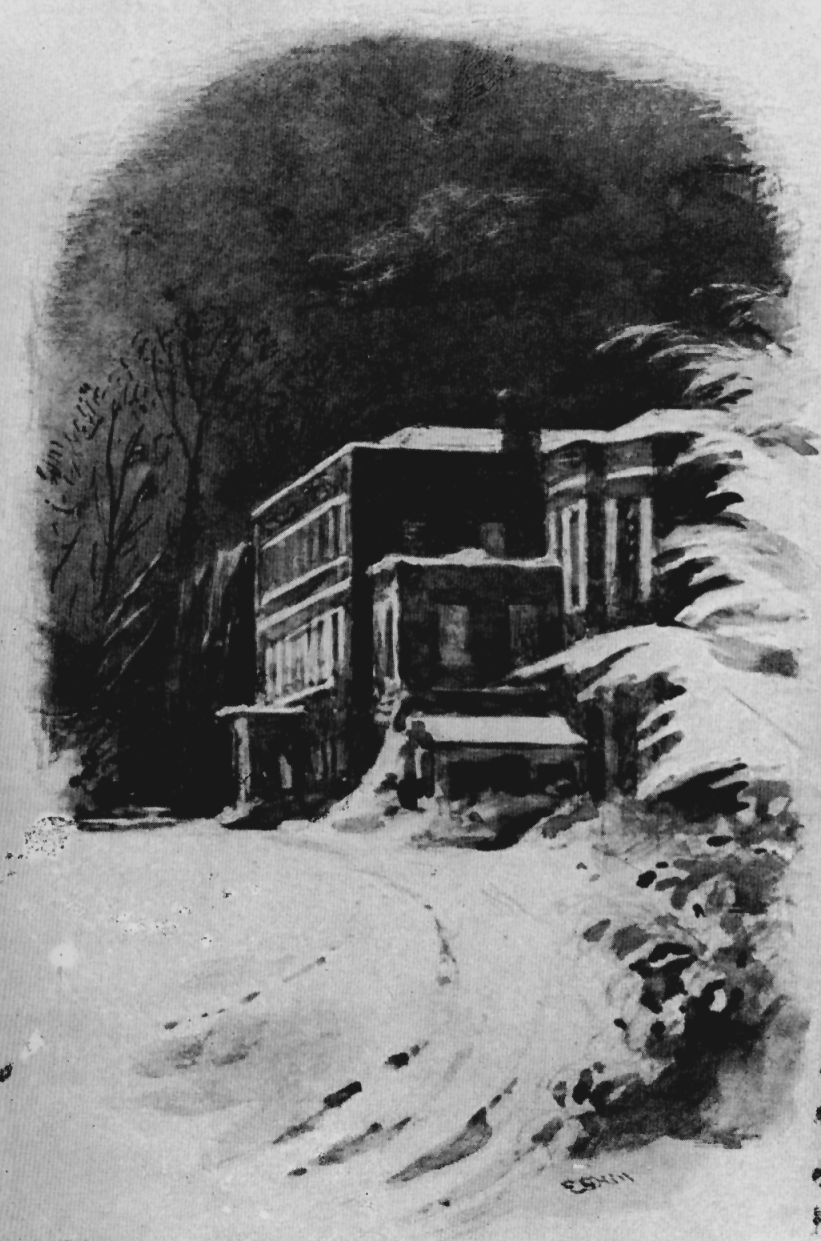
Rendering of Manydown Park from the early 20th century.

Manydown — or Manydown Park — was an ancient manor in Wootton St Lawrence, Hampshire, England. The fortunes of the estate were associated with those of the Wither family for more than 400 years. Author Jane Austen (1775–1817) was a frequent visitor at the Manydown great house circa 1799–1806 and received her only known proposal of marriage there.

== History ==
The manor of Manydown at Wootton was a possession of the prior and convent of St. Swithun from the time of the Domesday Book (1086). (A Manor of Wootton was probably created for Ethelric the thegn in the year 958, long before the name “Manydown” was first devised.) Manydown estate was granted a licence to impark the wood of Wootton in 1332 and was visited by royal huntsmen in 1361 and 1363. In 1377 it was fenced in. William of Wykeham (1324–1404) was supplied with oak timber from the estate when he reconstructed Winchester Cathedral nave around 1390–92. In 1449, William Wither — whose family had lived at Manydown as tenants since at least 1402 (some sources say as early as 1344) — purchased the manor. William thereby commenced a long and eventful connection between his descendants and Manydown that continued for some four centuries.

The connection with the local priory continued until the time of the dissolution of the monasteries, when, in 1540, King Henry VIII granted Manydown to the Dean and Chapter of Winchester Cathedral. This situation continued until 1649–50 when, under the Commonwealth Republic, it passed into the hands of the Contractors of the Long Parliament and was sold to another William Wither (1584–1653). Following the Restoration (1660), it was returned to the Dean and Chapter, without compensation being paid to the Wither family. They did allow the then current Mr. Wither to retain the Manydown manor house and the estates as their tenant on a 21 years' lease, renewable in the usual way every seven years, at a small annual rent and a moderate fine.

In 1789, the last Mr Wither died without an heir and a cousin of his — the Reverend Lovelace Bigg (1741–1813) — inherited the estate. Bigg and his two sons thereupon changed their surnames to “Bigg-Wither”. Lovelace also rebuilt the south front of the manor house in 1790. Manydown was at this time one of a number of important estates located to the west of Basingstoke that were socially connected and the social life of which was the subject of the novels of Jane Austen (see below). Harris Bigg-Wither (1781–1833) inherited Manydown when his father Lovelace died in 1813, and he rented it out and moved to nearby Tangier Park. Harris's son — also named Lovelace (1805–1874) — inherited Manydown, and later also bought Tangier Park.

The last recorded court was held at Manydown in 1863 and on the last day of that year, house and park were converted into freehold, alienated from the manor, and sold to the younger Lovelace Bigg-Wither. The long association of the manor with the Wither and Bigg-Wither family finally ended when the estate was purchased by Sir Edward Bates (1816–1896) in 1871. Sir Edward's grand-nephew — Col. S. Arthur Bates (1879–1958) — was the last “lord of the manor” at Manydown. An auction was held to sell the estate's moveable property in 1962 and the great house itself was finally pulled down in 1965.

== List of lords of the manor at Manydown ==
With dates of tenure in parentheses:

- Thomas Wither (1484–1506)
- John Wither (1506–1536)
- Richard Wither (1536–1577)
- John Wither (1577–1620)
- William Wither I (1620–1653)
- William Wither II (1653–1671)
- William Wither III (1671–1679)
- William Wither IV (1679–1733)
- William Wither V (1733–1789)
- The Reverend Lovelace Bigg-Wither (1789–1813)
- Harris Bigg-Wither (1813–1833)
- Lovelace Bigg-Wither (1833–1871)
- Sir Edward Bates, 1st Baronet (1871–1896)
- Sydney Eggers Bates (1896–1924)
- Colonel Sydney Arthur Bates (1924–1958)

== Literary connections ==
Richard Wither (died 1577), grandfather of the satirist and poet George Wither (1588–1667), resided at Manydown.

The celebrated novelist Jane Austen (1775–1817), and her elder sister Cassandra (1773–1845), were friends for many years with three of the Bigg sisters then living at Manydown Park: Alethea, Elizabeth and Catherine Bigg (they had not added the “-Wither” to their surnames). Life at Manydown influenced Austen's works, providing material for her to create her famous and lasting legacy to English literature. Jane stayed at the house often, and wrote to her sister Cassandra of a ball of 8 January 1799: "Catherine [Bigg] has the honour of giving her name to a set, which will be composed of two Withers, two Heathcotes, a Blachfo[r]d, and no Bigg except herself". In late January 1801, Jane again visited the Bigg-Wither family at Manydown. Jane had recently been admonished by Cassandra, who at last had found the right suitor for her at Sidmouth, a clerical gentleman who unfortunately had died before the two could meet. Soon after the Sidmouth affair, on 25 November 1802, Jane and Cassandra arrived for a visit at Manydown yet again. A few days later (Thursday, 2 December), Lovelace's son Harris Bigg-Wither proposed marriage to Jane and was accepted (her only known engagement). Jane was almost 27; Harris was only 21 – an overgrown, timid, stammering, red-faced young man who had just graduated from Oxford. Bigg-Wither family celebrations were soon curtailed, however, when next morning Jane announced a change of heart. The ensuing confrontation ended with the Austen sisters demanding that their brother James abandon his duties as a clergyman and escort them back to Bath. They recovered from the incident with James and his wife Mary at Steventon. From February to mid-March 1806, the pair of Austen sisters visited the estate a final time, returning to Bath via Steventon.

Harris joined the North Hampshire Militia in 1803, and on 2nd November 1804, Harris married Anne Howe Frith (1783–1866) at East Dean, Sussex. They resided at Wymering Manor (about 30 miles away) where his six elder children were born. When his father died in 1813, they moved to Manydown.

== Description ==
The Manydown manor house was situated about one mile to the southwest of the village of Wootton St Lawrence and was surrounded by some 1,500 acres of parkland (reduced to 250 acres by the 20th century) along with 400 acres of plantations. The house itself was of considerable antiquity, some parts dating back to the 14th century, and included a central well, with a unique raising gear mechanism such that water could easily be conveyed to the upper rooms. The fabric of the house at the time of its demolition was mostly late 16th and early 17th century. Modernization had provided an elegant staircase leading to a grand first-floor drawing room which had a large bay window overlooking the impressive grounds. The house was built around a square court, known as Cheyney Court, on one side of which was the old court room, where the “courts Leet and Custumary” would be held.

== Gallery ==
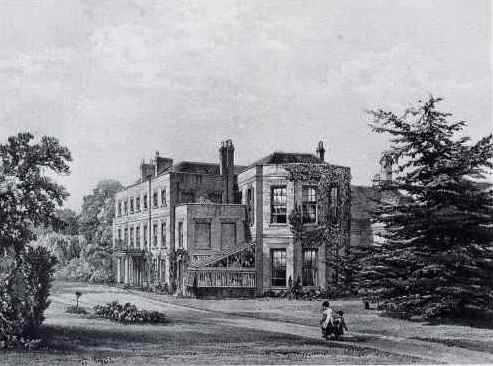
Late 18th century engraving of Manydown

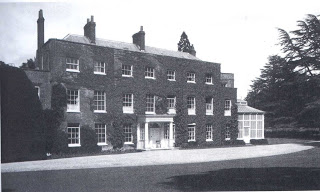
Photo of Manydown in the early 20th century

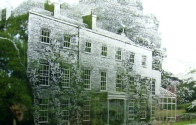
Window etching of Manydown in Wootton St Lawrence Church
