= Wootton St Lawrence =

Village and parish in Hampshire, England

Coordinates: 51.2768°N 1.1531°W

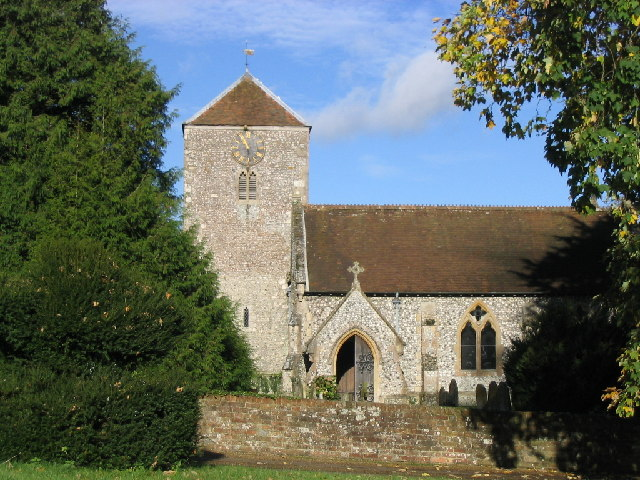
- Church of St. Lawrence

- Location within Hampshire
- Population: 636 (2011 Census. including Charter Alley, Ramsdel, Upper Wootton and West Heath)
- OS grid reference: SZ2477198254
- Civil parish: Wootton St Lawrence with Ramsdell
- District: Basingstoke and Deane
- Shire county: Hampshire
- Region: South East
- Country: England
- Sovereign state: United Kingdom
- Post town: Basingstoke
- Postcode district: RG23
- Dialling code: 01256
- Police: Hampshire and Isle of Wight
- Fire: Hampshire and Isle of Wight
- Ambulance: South Central
- UK Parliament: Basingstoke

Wootton St Lawrence is a small village in the civil parish of Wootton St Lawrence with Ramsdell, in Hampshire, England, 2.5 miles (4.0 km) west of Basingstoke. The name is derived from the Old English wudu tun meaning woodland settlement or farm.

== History ==
The manor of Wootton (see Manydown) was a possession of the prior and convent of St. Swithun from the time of the Domesday Book until the dissolution of the monasteries. The Dean and Chapter of Winchester sold the manor to William Wither in 1649. However, the manor was reclaimed by the church after the restoration and the family received no compensation. The manor returned to the family after the purchase by the Reverend Lovelace Bigg-Wither in 1863, but he sold it to the Bates family 10 years later. Wootton oak timber was used to reconstruct Winchester Cathedral nave c. 1390 by William of Wykeham.

== Governance ==
Wootton St Lawrence is in the civil parish of Wootton St Lawrence with Ramsdell with an elected Parish Council and falls within the local government district of Basingstoke and Deane, part of the shire county of Hampshire. On 1 July 1966 the East Oakley ward of Wootton St Lawrence Parish Council was added to Oakley Parish Council, with elections in May 1968. The council changed its name on 1 April 2021 to Wootton St Lawrence with Ramsdell Parish Council because the majority of the parish is on the Ramsdell side of the A339 covering Ramsdell.

== Religious sites ==
The village has a church named St Lawrence and the village is often regarded to its name. The mediaeval church was rebuilt in 1864, retaining the 12th century north arcade and tower and some of the 14th century windows.

== Notable residents ==
- Charles Butler (1560–1647), sometimes called the Father of English Beekeeping, was Vicar of St Lawrence for 48 years until his death in 1647
- Philip Lutley Sclater FRS FRGS FZS FLS (1829–1913), lawyer and zoologist, born in Wootton St Lawrence
