= National Register of Historic Places listings in Caswell County, North Carolina =

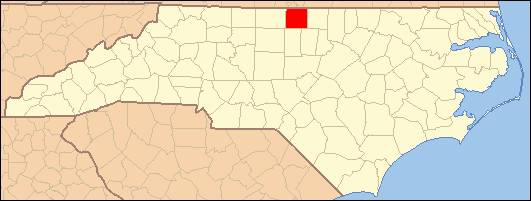

This list includes properties and districts listed on the National Register of Historic Places in Caswell County, North Carolina. Click the "Map of all coordinates" link to the right to view an online map of all properties and districts with latitude and longitude coordinates in the table below.

== Current listings ==
This National Park Service list is complete through NPS recent listings posted December 5, 2025.

	Name on the Register	Image	Date listed	Location	City or town	Description
1	Brown-Graves House and Brown's Store		July 15, 1974 (#74001334)	SW of Yanceyville on NC 150; 36°21′36″N 79°27′04″W	Locust Hill	
2	Caswell County Courthouse	Caswell County Courthouse	June 4, 1973 (#73001309)	Courthouse Sq. 36°24′11″N 79°20′11″W	Yanceyville	
3	Caswell County Training School	Caswell County Training School	January 25, 2018 (#100002047)	403 Dillard School Dr. 36°24′00″N 79°20′01″W	Yanceyville	
4	Garland-Buford House	Garland-Buford House	January 24, 1974 (#74001333)	N of Leasburg on SR 1561; 36°27′27″N 79°08′57″W	Leasburg	
5	Graves House	Graves House	November 20, 1974 (#74001335)	U.S. 158 at NC 86; 36°24′15″N 79°19′20″W	Yanceyville	
6	Griers Presbyterian Church and Cemetery	Griers Presbyterian Church and Cemetery	December 30, 1985 (#85003187)	SR 1710; 36°20′50″N 79°13′10″W	Frogsboro	
7	William Henry and Sarah Holderness House		December 2, 2014 (#14000982)	3082 US 158 W. 36°23′44″N 79°23′16″W	Yanceyville	
8	John Johnston House	John Johnston House	March 14, 1997 (#97000238)	1325 NC 62, N. 36°26′08″N 79°16′59″W	Yanceyville	
9	Longwood	Longwood	September 15, 1976 (#76001312)	SW of Milton on NC 62; 36°31′40″N 79°13′10″W	Milton	
10	James Malone House		April 30, 2008 (#08000367)	7374 US 158; 36°23′39″N 79°09′27″W	Leasburg	
11	Melrose/Williamson House	Melrose/Williamson House	February 28, 1985 (#85000379)	Off NC 62; 36°25′42″N 79°17′51″W	Yanceyville Township	
12	Milton Historic District	Milton Historic District	October 25, 1973 (#73001306)	Runs along Main St. from Atlantic and Danville RR to County Line Creek; 36°32′15″N 79°12′25″W	Milton	
13	Milton State Bank	Milton State Bank	April 13, 1973 (#73001307)	Main (Broad) St. 36°32′20″N 79°12′21″W	Milton	
14	Moore House		August 28, 1973 (#73001304)	E of Locust Hill off U.S. 158; 36°22′12″N 79°25′44″W	Locust Hill	
15	Poteat House	Poteat House	October 24, 1979 (#79001688)	N of Yanceyville on NC 62; 36°25′11″N 79°18′37″W	Yanceyville	
16	Red House Presbyterian Church	Red House Presbyterian Church	May 1, 2007 (#07000413)	13409 NC 119 N 36°29′15″N 79°09′46″W	Semora	
17	Rose Hill	Rose Hill	October 25, 1973 (#73001305)	On U.S. 158 at jct. with NC 150; 36°22′22″N 79°25′59″W	Locust Hill	
18	Nicholas and Lucretia Thompson House		December 8, 2022 (#100008468)	7846 US 158 East; 36°23′09″N 79°07′42″W	Leasburg	
19	Union Tavern	Union Tavern	May 15, 1975 (#75001245)	Main St. 36°32′18″N 79°12′24″W	Milton	
20	Warren House and Warren's Store	Warren House and Warren's Store	June 19, 1973 (#73001308)	On NC 86; 36°14′56″N 79°11′24″W	Prospect Hill	
21	Wemple-Shelton House		August 8, 2023 (#100009231)	2215 US 158 West; 36°24′23″N 79°23′05″W	Yanceyville vicinity	
22	Wildwood	Wildwood	October 5, 2001 (#01001076)	5680 Stephentown Rd. 36°27′20″N 79°11′47″W	Semora	
23	Woodside	Woodside	March 6, 1986 (#86000420)	NC 57; 36°31′33″N 79°10′58″W	Milton	
24	Bartlett Yancey House	Bartlett Yancey House	December 4, 1973 (#73001310)	Southern side of U.S. Route 158, 0.3 miles west of the NC 1500 junction 36°24′58″N 79°21′45″W	Yanceyville	
25	Yanceyville Historic District	Yanceyville Historic District	October 15, 1973 (#73001311)	W. Main St., Courthouse Sq., and North Ave. to Church St. 36°24′19″N 79°20′27″W	Yanceyville	

== See also ==
- National Register of Historic Places listings in North Carolina
- List of National Historic Landmarks in North Carolina
