= Graves House (disambiguation) =

Graves House may refer to:

- Graves House, a historic house in Yanceyville, North Carolina
- Sereno W. Graves House, a historic house in Rutland, Wisconsin
- Top Gun House, a historic house in Oceanside, California formerly known as the Graves House
