= Kansas City BBQ =

Kansas City BBQ may refer to:

- Kansas City–style barbecue, one of the four predominant regional styles of barbecue in the United States
- Kansas City Barbeque, a restaurant and bar in San Diego, California
