= Aaron and Adam Weis =

American twins and former child actors

Aaron Weis and Adam Weis (sometimes misspelled Weiss) are American former child actors and school teachers. They are known for sharing the role of four-year-old Bradley Bradshaw in the 1986 film Top Gun. Scenes with them were reprised in the 2022 sequel Top Gun: Maverick, featuring Miles Teller in the role of grown-up Bradley Bradshaw.

== Life ==
The Weis brothers come from San Diego, born to Dennis and Martha Weis. In 1985, they were hired for the film Top Gun starring Tom Cruise after winning a movie casting, held at Point Loma for four-year-old identical twins. Taking turns on set for three days of filming, they played the young Bradley Bradshaw, son of Nick "Goose" Bradshaw (Anthony Edwards) and his wife Carole (Meg Ryan), in three appearances. The first one shows Carole and Bradley uniting with Goose at the airport. Another scene in Kansas City Barbeque has Bradley sitting on the piano where his father plays "Great Balls of Fire". The brothers were paid $384 each for their role (equivalent to $1,128 in 2025).

Following the shooting of the film, names and pictures of the twins and their role were published in Viltis magazine in December 1985. Still, the film as published treated them as non-speaking extras; so they remained uncredited and largely unknown to the public. They were pictured in People magazine as "unknown extras". After a few more casting calls, their only other appearance was in a SeaWorld commercial together with other twins, most notably Mary-Kate and Ashley Olsen, after which they did not follow an acting career.

They graduated in 1999 as co-valedictorians from Clairemont High School, subsequently attended University of California, Santa Barbara and San Francisco State University and obtained their teaching credentials. Now they both work as teachers in San Francisco Bay Area. Aaron teaches sixth grade math and science at Rooftop Alternative School in San Francisco, Adam teaches fifth grade at Berkeley Arts Magnet school (since 2008).

As of 2018, Adam received a Classroom Grant from the Berkeley Public Schools Fund each year for the annual outdoor education trip, introduced to the school by him. Both brothers have been awarded the title of Bay Area Teacher of the Month by the non-profit organization 826 Valencia, Aaron in September 2014 and Adam in May 2015. In May 2018, Aaron was named a San Francisco's 2017-18 Teacher of the Year honoree by mayor Mark Farrell. Since the early 2010s, Aaron has been a teacher representative of the parent-teacher association; he was honored by the San Francisco Second District PTA in 2022 on the occasion of the organization's 125th birthday.

== Reprise of their role ==
Several years after the release of Top Gun, the names of the Weis twins became publicly known. In 2011, a CNN featured an interview with their mother Martha, including many photos from the set.

In 2018, news outlets reported that the Top Gun sequel in production would feature the character Bradley Bradshaw in a major role, played by Miles Teller, bringing the Weis twins to public awareness again. The twins were not asked to return into their role as Paramount auditioned professional actors only. Asked on their opinion of the casting, Adam wondered whether Teller (born 1987) may be a bit too young for the role, but neither brother wanted to make a judgment before seeing the film.

In an early scene of the sequel titled Top Gun: Maverick, Tom Cruise's character Pete "Maverick" Mitchell is seen looking over a pinned-up photo collection of his life, including the Bradshaw family with little Bradley. In the final cut of the film, several shots of the original film including little Bradley in the bar were reprised as flashbacks of Maverick in the scene where grown-up Bradley also plays "Great Balls of Fire" on a piano. It had not been included in the script, but was conceived during the editing process by director Joseph Kosinski, who felt that it helped to explain the main characters' relationship and to deepen their emotional conflicts.

The Weis twins have been incorporated or mentioned in several cast lists as the only uncredited actors of the Top Gun franchise They also have been mentioned in articles specifically describing the Top Gun: Maverick bar scene.
