= George Williamson (North Carolina politician) =

American politician

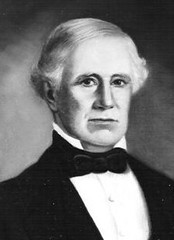

Member of the North Carolina State Senate
- In office November 18, 1850 – January 29, 1851

Personal details
- Born: September 11, 1788 Caswell County, North Carolina, US
- Died: August 22, 1856 (aged 67) Caswell County, North Carolina, US
- Resting place: Melrose/Williamson House
- Children: 11

George "Royal George" Williamson (1788–1856) was a Caswell County Sheriff from 1815 to 1832, one of the justices of the Court of Pleas and Quarter Sessions, Chairman of the Court, he served as a member of the Council of State from 1834 to 1836, as a member of the North Carolina State Senate, and as a charter member of the Bank of Yanceyville in 1852. “Royal George” was a state senator who represented North Carolina's 37th District (now 30th District) from November 18, 1850 to January 29, 1851. He owned the Melrose/Williamson House, which is a historic plantation house, which was added to the National Register of Historic Places in 1985.
