= Piedmont College (disambiguation) =

Piedmont College is the common name of many colleges including:

- Piedmont College, since 2021 Piedmont University, a private liberal arts school in Demorest, Georgia
- Piedmont Community College, a two-year post-secondary institution in Person and Caswell counties in North Carolina
- Piedmont Technical College, a two-year community college in the Lakelands region of South Carolina
- Central Piedmont Community College, a large community college in Charlotte, North Carolina
- Georgia Piedmont Technical College, a technical college in Clarkston, Georgia
- Piedmont Virginia Community College, a two-year educational institution located in Albemarle County, Virginia
- South Piedmont Community College, a community college located in the areas of Anson and Union counties in North Carolina
- Western Piedmont Community College, a community college in Morganton, North Carolina
- Carolina University, formerly known as Piedmont Baptist College, a private independent Baptist Bible college and seminary in Winston-Salem, North Carolina
