= Top Gun House =

Historic house in California

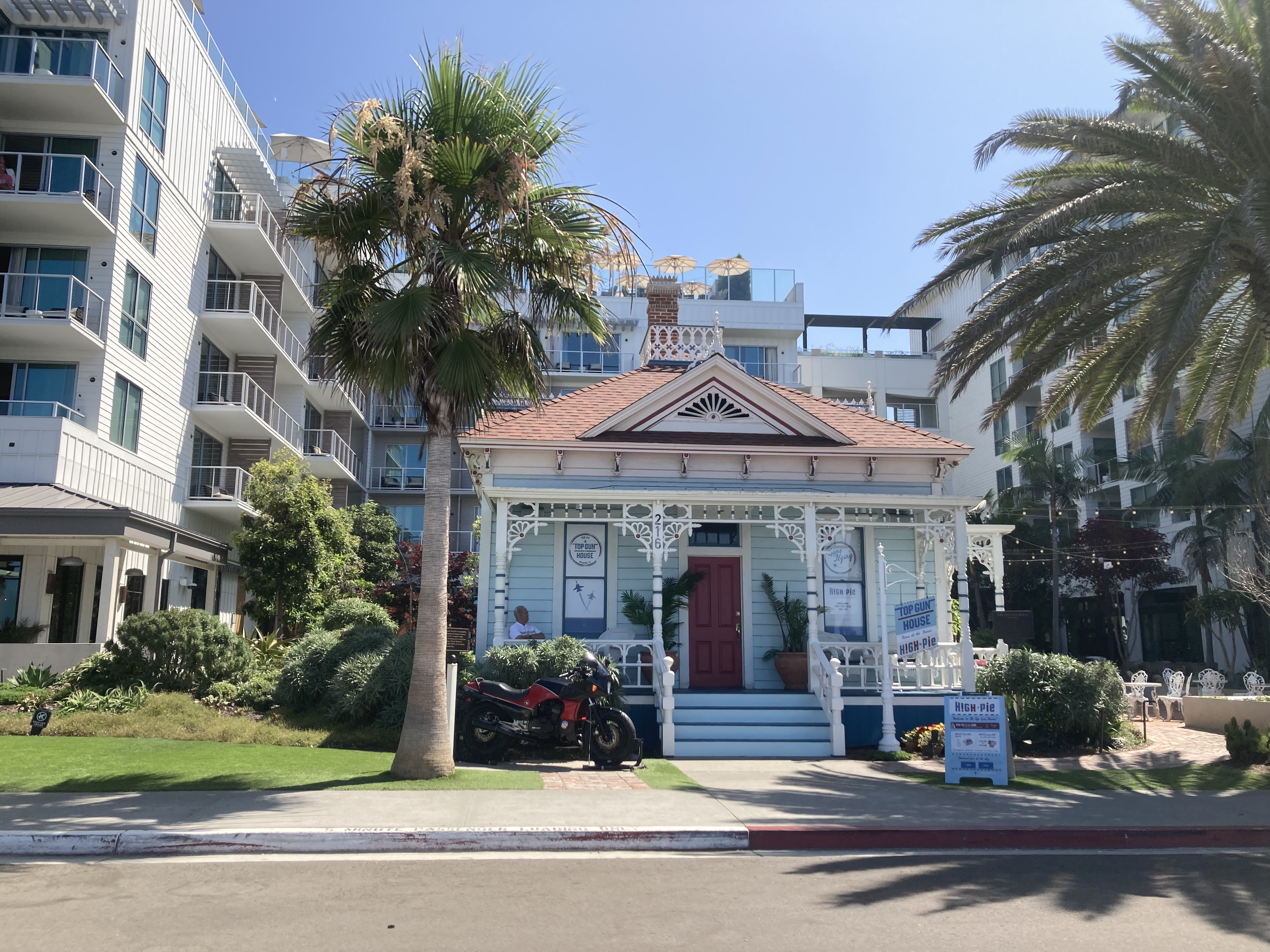
- The house in 2023, from the road

- Location within California Location within the United States
- Former names: Graves House; Graves' cottage

General information
- Status: Completed
- Location: 250 N Pacific St, Oceanside, CA 92054
- Coordinates: 33.1946°N 117.3832°W
- Construction started: 1888
- Completed: 1888
- Relocated: May 20, 2022
- Cost: $1,050
- Owner: Mission Pacific Hotel

Technical details
- Floor area: 500 sq ft (46 m^{2})
- Grounds: 2.75 acres (1.11 ha)

Design and construction
- Architect: Ed Durgan

Website
- www.highpief10.com

The Top Gun House, formerly known as the Graves House, is a historic landmark in Oceanside, California known for being in a scene in the 1986 action drama film Top Gun, starring Tom Cruise. It was built in 1888 and utilizes Folk Victorian styles, being one of the earliest surviving examples of it in San Diego County. As of 2023, it is in possession of the Mission Pacific Hotel and contains a pie shop.

== History ==
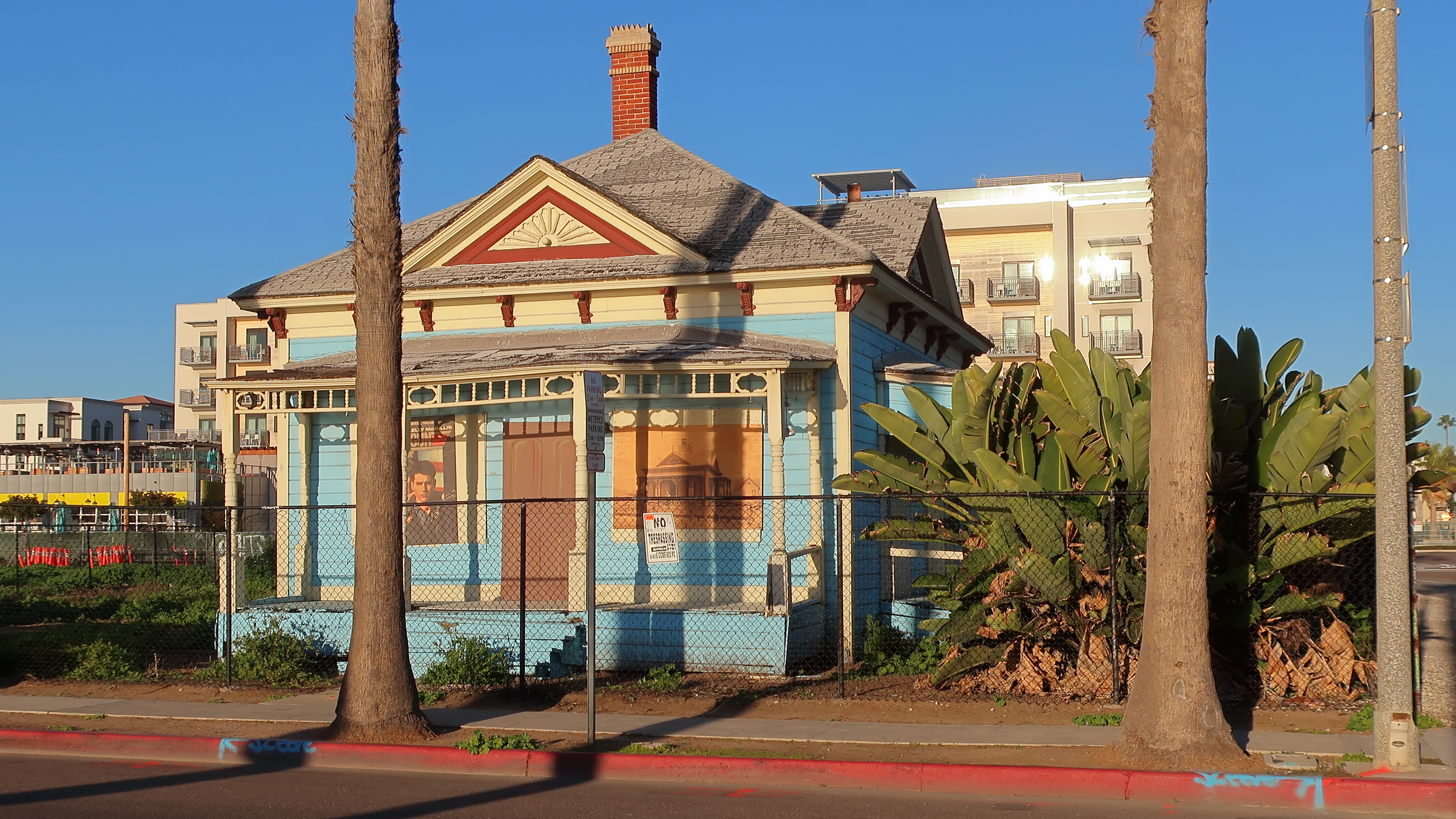
The house in 2019, before the relocation

The lot was first purchased in 1886 by Dr. Henry Graves, a surgeon from Ohio, for $1,050 (equivalent to $37,625 in 2025). It was to be used as a seasonal summer home for him and his wife Sarah and was completed in 1888. (Note: Some sources erroneously report that the house was completed in 1887, but the South Oceanside Diamond, a local newspaper, stated that the house was nearing completion in its November 2, 1888 issue, as shown here.) They continued to summer there until March 1905 when they sold it to Charles and Lillian Burlock. The Burlocks sold the building to Southwestern Realty in 1910 and it was purchased again in 1921 by F.C. Janssen. The Graves continued to be associated with the house until 1914, with locals still calling it the "Graves' cottage" until then. B.C. and Margaret Beers bought the building in 1926, selling it to Edward and Edith Deggendorf and Angeline G. Morgan in 1928 and 1929, respectively. Her son rented the house until 1966, sharing it with his family before selling it to an amusement park on the beach, called Pacific Holidayland, which closed in 1983.

The house soon fell into disrepair but was bought again by Lynn and William Rego in December 1975, for $75,000. They repainted the originally brown house to its signature blue color. The Regos were contacted by Paramount Pictures, who were looking for a beach cottage as a film location, in 1985. The studio rented the house and the one behind it for two weeks in June and was prepared by the crew by removing road signs and covering curbs with sand. In Top Gun, the house was used as the main love interest, Charlie Blackwood's (played by Kelly McGillis) dwelling.

The cottage was included in a Cultural Resource Survey in 1992, being noted as "one of the few 1880s beach cottages remaining in near-pristine condition." In 2001, the Save Our Heritage Organisation listed the building in its Most Endangered List of Historic Resources due to a hotel planned to be constructed on the block. In preparation for a new hotel, the block that held the house was cleared, destroying three other historic houses, including the one behind the Top Gun House that appeared in the film. A fourth, called the Pishon house, was saved by relocation. The Oceanside Historical Society helped maintain the house and put up a sign informing tourists and passersby about the historical significance of the house. A fence had to be erected in 2009 to prevent intentional damage to the house, as multiple people had been breaking in.

S.D. Malkin Properties, Inc. announced that the house was to be restored and be used as the "centerpiece" of a new resort. It was relocated and restored a block north of its original location in the courtyard of the new Mission Pacific Hotel in 2020, reopening on May 20, 2022, a week before the release of Top Gun: Maverick, the movie's sequel. The restoration cost almost $1 million. It is home to a pie shop, called High-Pie, and some Top Gun memorabilia. A replica of the Kawasaki GPZ900R Tom Cruise rides in the movie is displayed in front of the house as well.

== High-Pie ==
High-Pie, which opened in 2022, is the pie shop located in the house. It was created by Tara Lazar, a native of Palm Springs. There, she owns three restaurants, two bars, a hotel, and a catering company. A dessert concept worked best in comparison to the shop's small size and both Lazar and Scott Malkin, the owner of the hotel, were fans of apple pie. It is open from 10AM to 8PM daily. The shop offers pies in apple, cherry, blueberry, lemon, and peach flavors, with Pie à la Modes and a variety of themed beverages. It also sells merchandise themed after the shop.

== See also ==
- Kansas City Barbeque
