= Maud Gatewood =

American painter

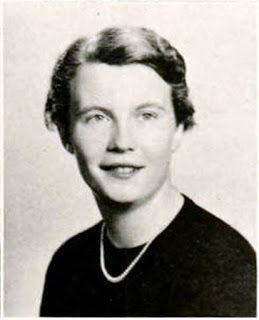
- Gatewood in 1954
- Born: January 8, 1934; Yanceyville, North Carolina, U.S.
- Died: November 8, 2004 (aged 70); Durham, North Carolina
- Known for: Painting
- Movement: Realism, Abstract

Maud Florance Gatewood (January 8, 1934 – November 8, 2004) was an American artist from Yanceyville, North Carolina. Art historians, museum directors, curators, and collectors recognize her as one of North Carolina's most distinguished painters.

== Biography ==
=== Early life and career ===
Maud Gatewood grew up in Yanceyville and attended Bartlett Yancey High School. When she was sixteen she enrolled at the Woman’s College of the University of North Carolina, which is presently the University of North Carolina at Greensboro. Finishing her undergraduate coursework in 1954, Gatewood continued her art studies at Ohio State University where she received a Master of Fine Arts degree.

In 1963, Gatewood won a Fulbright grant to study art in Austria under renowned painter Oskar Kokoschka. Returning to North Carolina, she began teaching art at the University of North Carolina at Charlotte. She later left her position at the school in 1973, desiring more time to paint.

In 1975, Gatewood became a professor at Averett University, where she taught until her retirement in 1997. During this time, she was also the first woman elected to the Caswell County Board of Commissioners in 1976, where she advocated for economic development, land use planning, and expanded human services.

During her lifetime, Gatewood’s work was exhibited at museums and galleries throughout the United States, particularly in the Southeastern United States. Her paintings also entered private and institutional collections, including the National Museum of Women in the Arts (Washington, D.C.).

Gatewood won numerous awards during her artistic career, including an art award from the American Academy of Arts and Letters in 1972 and the North Carolina Award in Fine Arts in 1984.

== Legacy ==
In 2025, the Danville Museum of Fine Arts and History held a major retrospective exhibition of Gatewood's work, titled Maud Gatewood Takeover. The exhibition featured over 200 pieces, including paintings, drawings, and photographs, with some being publicly displayed for the first time. The exhibit highlighted her artistic journey, showcasing both abstract and representational works.
