= Bartlett Yancey =

American politician

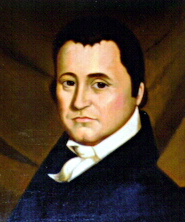

Member of the U.S. House of Representatives from North Carolina's 9th district
- In office March 4, 1813 – March 3, 1817
- Preceded by: James Cochran
- Succeeded by: Thomas Settle

Personal details
- Born: February 19, 1785 North Carolina, U.S.
- Died: August 30, 1828 (aged 43) Caswell County, North Carolina, U.S.

Bartlett Yancey (February 19, 1785 – August 30, 1828) was an American politician who was a U.S. congressman from North Carolina, United States, between 1813 and 1817. He was a member of the Democratic-Republican party.

Born near Yanceyville, North Carolina, Yancey attended Hyco Academy in Caswell County before enrolling at the University of North Carolina at Chapel Hill from 1804 to 1806. After studying in Hillsborough, North Carolina under Archibald Debow Murphey, Yancey was admitted to the North Carolina bar in 1807 and practiced law. He was also a slave owner.

Yancey was elected to the 13th United States Congress in 1812 and re-elected in 1814 to the 14th Congress, serving from March 4, 1813 to March 3, 1817. During both terms, he chaired the Committee on Claims. Refusing to run for Congress again in 1816, Yancey instead ran for the North Carolina Senate and served there for ten years, from 1817 to 1827; he served as Speaker of the North Carolina Senate for his entire tenure in the legislature.

In 1825, Bartlett Yancey was offered the position of "Minister" to Peru. Today this position is called ambassador. While the offer formally was made by President John Quincy Adams, it was upon the recommendation of US Secretary of State Henry Clay, who served in that post 1825 to 1829. Yancey declined the offer.

In 1808, Bartlett Yancey married his first cousin Ann Graves (1786-1855), and the couple had ten children. No son of Bartlett Yancey had a son; thus, this branch of the Yancey surname died out.

He died at his home, "Oakland", near Milton, North Carolina, in 1828, and is buried in the Yancey Family Cemetery in Yanceyville.

The town of Yanceyville in Caswell County, North Carolina, Bartlett Yancey High School, and Yancey County, North Carolina are all named in his honor. The Bartlett Yancey House in Yanceyville was added to the National Register of Historic Places in 1973.

U.S. House of Representatives
Preceded by James Cochran	Member of the U.S. House of Representatives from North Carolina's 9th congressional district 1813-1817	Succeeded by Thomas Settle
