= Top Gun =

1986 action drama film by Tony Scott

- Theatrical release poster
- Directed by: Tony Scott
- Written by: Jim Cash; Jack Epps Jr.
- Based on: "Top Guns" by Ehud Yonay
- Produced by: Don Simpson; Jerry Bruckheimer
- Starring: Tom Cruise; Kelly McGillis; Val Kilmer; Anthony Edwards; Tom Skerritt
- Cinematography: Jeffrey L. Kimball
- Edited by: Chris Lebenzon; Billy Weber
- Music by: Harold Faltermeyer
- Production companies: Paramount Pictures; Don Simpson/Jerry Bruckheimer Films
- Distributed by: Paramount Pictures
- Release dates: May 12, 1986 (New York City); May 16, 1986 (United States)
- Running time: 109 minutes
- Country: United States
- Language: English
- Budget: $13–15 million
- Box office: $360.6 million

Top Gun is a 1986 American action drama film directed by Tony Scott and produced by Don Simpson and Jerry Bruckheimer, with distribution by Paramount Pictures. The screenplay was written by Jim Cash and Jack Epps Jr., and was inspired by an article titled "Top Guns", written by Ehud Yonay and published in California magazine three years earlier. It stars Tom Cruise as Lieutenant Pete "Maverick" Mitchell, a young naval aviator aboard the aircraft carrier USS Enterprise. He and his radar intercept officer, Lieutenant (junior grade) Nick "Goose" Bradshaw (Anthony Edwards), are given the chance to train at the United States Navy's Fighter Weapons School (Top Gun) at Naval Air Station Miramar in San Diego, California. Kelly McGillis, Val Kilmer, and Tom Skerritt also appear in supporting roles.

Top Gun was released in the United States on May 16, 1986. The film received mixed reviews from critics, with praise for its visual effects, soundtrack, and dogfight sequences, but criticism for its plot, characters, and reliance on style over substance. Despite this, four weeks after its release, the number of theaters showing it increased by 45 percent, and it overcame initial critical resistance to become a huge commercial hit, grossing over $360 million worldwide against a production budget of $15 million. Top Gun was the highest-grossing film of 1986.

The film maintained its popularity over the years and earned an IMAX 3D re-release in 2013, while the retrospective critical reception became more positive, with the film also emerging as a cult classic. Additionally, the soundtrack to the film has since become one of the most popular film soundtracks to date, reaching 9× Platinum certification. The film won both an Academy Award and a Golden Globe for "Take My Breath Away" performed by Berlin.

In 2015, the United States Library of Congress selected the film for preservation in the National Film Registry, finding it "culturally, historically, or aesthetically significant". A sequel, Top Gun: Maverick, in which Cruise and Kilmer reprised their roles, was released 36 years later on May 27, 2022, to widespread critical acclaim and commercial success.

== Plot ==
U.S. Navy naval aviator Lieutenant Pete "Maverick" Mitchell and his radar intercept officer (RIO) Lieutenant Junior Grade Nick "Goose" Bradshaw, stationed in the Indian Ocean aboard USS Enterprise, fly the F-14A Tomcat. During an interception with two hostile MiG-28s, (Note: Fictional planes portrayed by Northrop F-5s) Maverick missile-locks on one, while the other hostile locks onto Maverick's wingman, Cougar. Maverick drives it off, but Cougar is so shaken that Maverick, despite being low on fuel, defies orders to land first, so he can shepherd him back to the carrier. As a result, Cougar leaves his commission and loses his opportunity to attend Top Gun, the Naval Fighter Weapons School at Naval Air Station Miramar. Maverick and Goose are sent in his place by CAG "Stinger," but not without getting a reprimand for disobeying the landing order.

Before the first day of instruction, Maverick unsuccessfully approaches a woman at a bar. He learns the next day she is an astrophysicist and civilian Top Gun instructor, Charlotte "Charlie" Blackwood. She becomes interested in Maverick upon learning of his inverted maneuver with a MiG-28. In Maverick's first training hop, he flies below 10,000 feet (3,000 m), breaking a major rule of engagement, to defeat instructor Lieutenant Commander Rick "Jester" Heatherly. Maverick and Goose also buzz the control tower when specifically told not to do so. They are reprimanded by the Top Gun Commanding Officer, Commander Mike "Viper" Metcalf.

Privately, Jester tells Viper that while he admires Maverick's skill, he is not sure if he would trust him in combat. In class, Charlie objects to Maverick's aggressive tactics against the MiG-28, but privately tells him she admires his flying; they begin a romantic relationship.

On training Hop 19, Maverick abandons his wingman, "Hollywood," to chase Viper. As a result, first Hollywood, and then Maverick, are defeated in a demonstration of the value of teamwork. Jester tells Maverick his flying is excellent, but criticizes him for leaving his wingman. Maverick's rival, Lieutenant Tom "Iceman" Kazansky, calls his behavior "foolish," "dangerous," and worse than the enemy, to which Maverick responds, "I am dangerous."

Maverick and Iceman, the leading contenders for the Top Gun Trophy, chase an A-4 in Hop 31. As Iceman has trouble getting a lock on the A-4, Maverick pressures him to break off so that he can move into firing position, with Iceman 5 seconds away from a lock. However, Maverick's F-14 flies through Iceman's jet wash and suffers a flameout of both engines, going into an unrecoverable flat spin. Maverick and Goose eject, but Goose slams into the jettisoned aircraft canopy and is killed by the impact.

The board of inquiry clears Maverick of any wrongdoing, but he is shaken and guilt-ridden, and considers quitting. He seeks advice from Viper, who flew with Maverick's father in the Vietnam War air battle where he was killed. Contrary to official reports faulting Maverick's father, Viper says he was wounded but continued fighting, saving 3 allied planes before dying. He tells Maverick he can succeed if he regains his self-confidence. Maverick chooses to graduate and congratulates Iceman, who has won the Top Gun Trophy. Iceman, Hollywood, and Maverick receive immediate deployment orders to deal with a crisis situation; they are sent to Enterprise to provide air support for the rescue of the SS Layton, a disabled communication ship that drifted into hostile waters.

Aboard Enterprise, Iceman and Hollywood are assigned to provide air cover, with Maverick and RIO Merlin on standby. Iceman expresses his concerns to Stinger about Maverick's mental state, but is told to just do his job. Iceman and Hollywood are pulled into a dogfight with what first appear to be two MiGs, but turn out to be six. After Hollywood is shot down and parachutes to safety, Maverick is scrambled alone due to catapult failure. He goes into a spin after encountering another jet wash, but recovers. Shaken, he breaks off temporarily, but then re-engages and shoots down two MiGs with AIM-9 Sidewinders, and dogfights a third, shooting it down with guns. Iceman destroys a fourth, and the remaining two MiGs withdraw. Upon their triumphant return to Enterprise, the pilots share their newfound respect for one another. Finally confident and able to let go of the guilt caused by the training accident, Maverick later throws Goose's dog tags overboard.

Offered the choice of any assignment, Maverick chooses to return to Top Gun as an instructor. He and Charlie reunite at a bar in Miramar.

== Cast ==
- Tom Cruise as LT Pete "Maverick" Mitchell: A U.S. Navy aviator assigned to Top Gun. The character was loosely based on Duke Cunningham and his accomplishments during the Vietnam War.
- Kelly McGillis as Charlotte "Charlie" Blackwood: Instructor of Top Gun and Maverick's love interest. The character is based on a real-life person, Christine Fox, who worked at Naval Air Station Miramar.
- Val Kilmer as LT Tom "Iceman" Kazansky: Top Gun's best student and Maverick's rival turned wingman.
- Anthony Edwards as LTJG Nick "Goose" Bradshaw: Maverick's radar intercept officer and best friend.
- Tom Skerritt as CDR Mike "Viper" Metcalf: Commanding officer and instructor of Top Gun. A veteran of the Vietnam War who served with Duke Mitchell, Maverick's father. The character was based on a real person: Rear Admiral Pete "Viper" Pettigrew, a former Navy aviator, Vietnam War veteran and Top Gun instructor, who served as a technical advisor on the film and also makes a cameo appearance in the film as a colleague of Charlie.
- Michael Ironside as LCDR Rick "Jester" Heatherly: A Naval Aviator, and Top Gun instructor
- John Stockwell as LT Bill "Cougar" Cortell: Maverick's former wingman
- Rick Rossovich as LTJG Ron "Slider" Kerner: Iceman's radar intercept officer
- Tim Robbins as LTJG Sam "Merlin" Wells: Cougar's radar intercept officer (later Maverick's during the climax)
- Clarence Gilyard as LTJG Marcus "Sundown" Williams: Chipper's radar intercept officer (later Maverick's during the end of training)
- Whip Hubley as LT Rick "Hollywood" Neven: A student from Top Gun and Iceman's wingman during the climax
- Barry Tubb as LT Henry "Wolfman" Ruth: Hollywood's radar intercept officer
- James Tolkan as CDR Tom "Stinger" Jardian: Commander of the USS Enterprise Carrier Air Group
- Meg Ryan as Carole Bradshaw: wife of LTJG Nick "Goose" Bradshaw
- Adrian Pasdar as LT Charles "Chipper" Piper: A Naval Aviator and student of Top Gun
- Duke Stroud as Air Boss Johnson
- Aaron and Adam Weis as Bradley Bradshaw: Goose and Carole's son (uncredited)
- Scott Altman as Lt. Scott: "D-Bear" Altman, F-14 aircrew (uncredited)
- Scott Krambeck as Scott, F-14 aircrew on USS Enterprise (CVN-65) (uncredited)

== Production ==
=== Development ===
The primary inspiration for the film was the article "Top Guns" by Ehud Yonay, from the May 1983 issue of California magazine, which featured aerial photography by then-Lieutenant Commander Charles "Heater" Heatley. The article detailed the life of fighter pilots at Naval Air Station Miramar in San Diego, self-nicknamed "Fightertown USA". Numerous screenwriters allegedly turned down the project. Jerry Bruckheimer and Don Simpson went on to hire Jim Cash and Jack Epps Jr., to write the first draft. The research methods, by Epps, included attendance at several declassified Top Gun classes at Miramar and gaining experience by being flown in an F-14. The first draft failed to impress Bruckheimer and Simpson, and is considered to be very different from the final product in numerous ways. David Cronenberg and John Carpenter were approached to direct the film, but both declined. Tony Scott was hired to direct on the strength of a commercial he had done for Swedish automaker Saab in the early 1980s, where a Saab 900 turbo is shown racing a Saab 37 Viggen fighter jet.

Actor Matthew Modine turned down the role of Pete Mitchell because he felt the film's pro-military stance went against his politics; he chose to do Full Metal Jacket instead. The producers wanted Tom Cruise for the role after seeing him in Risky Business. Cruise was offered the part while he was in London filming Legend; he was reluctant to take the part, but Tony's brother Ridley Scott convinced him to take it. Cruise liked the script but thought it needed work and convinced the producers to rewrite it with him before starring in the film. For the role of Maverick, before Tom Cruise, Emilio Estevez, Patrick Swayze, Sean Penn, Rob Lowe, Charlie Sheen, Michael J. Fox and Ralph Macchio were considered, while Brooke Shields, Demi Moore and Julianne Phillips were the possible candidates for Charlie. Phillips had been scheduled to perform a screen test opposite Tom Cruise.

Val Kilmer was reluctant to play Kazansky as he found the script "silly" and disliked warmongering in films, but took the role as he was under contractual obligations with the studio and Scott's enthusiasm on the project. Kilmer's performance in the role, however, turned out upon release to be one of his best, and he reprised the role 34 years later, portraying a dying Kazansky as he himself was declining from terminal cancer.

The producers wanted the assistance of the U.S. Navy in the production of the film. The Navy was influential in relation to script approval, which resulted in changes being made. The opening dogfight was moved to international waters as opposed to Cuba, the language was toned down, and a scene that involved a crash on the deck of an aircraft carrier was also scrapped. Maverick's love interest was also changed from a female enlisted member of the Navy to a civilian contractor with the Navy, due to the U.S. military's prohibition of fraternization between officers and enlisted personnel. The "Charlie" character also replaced an aerobics instructor from an early draft as a love interest for Maverick after producers were introduced to Christine "Legs" Fox, a civilian mathematician employed by the Center for Naval Analyses as a specialist in Maritime Air Superiority (MAS), developing tactics for aircraft carrier defense.

=== Filming ===
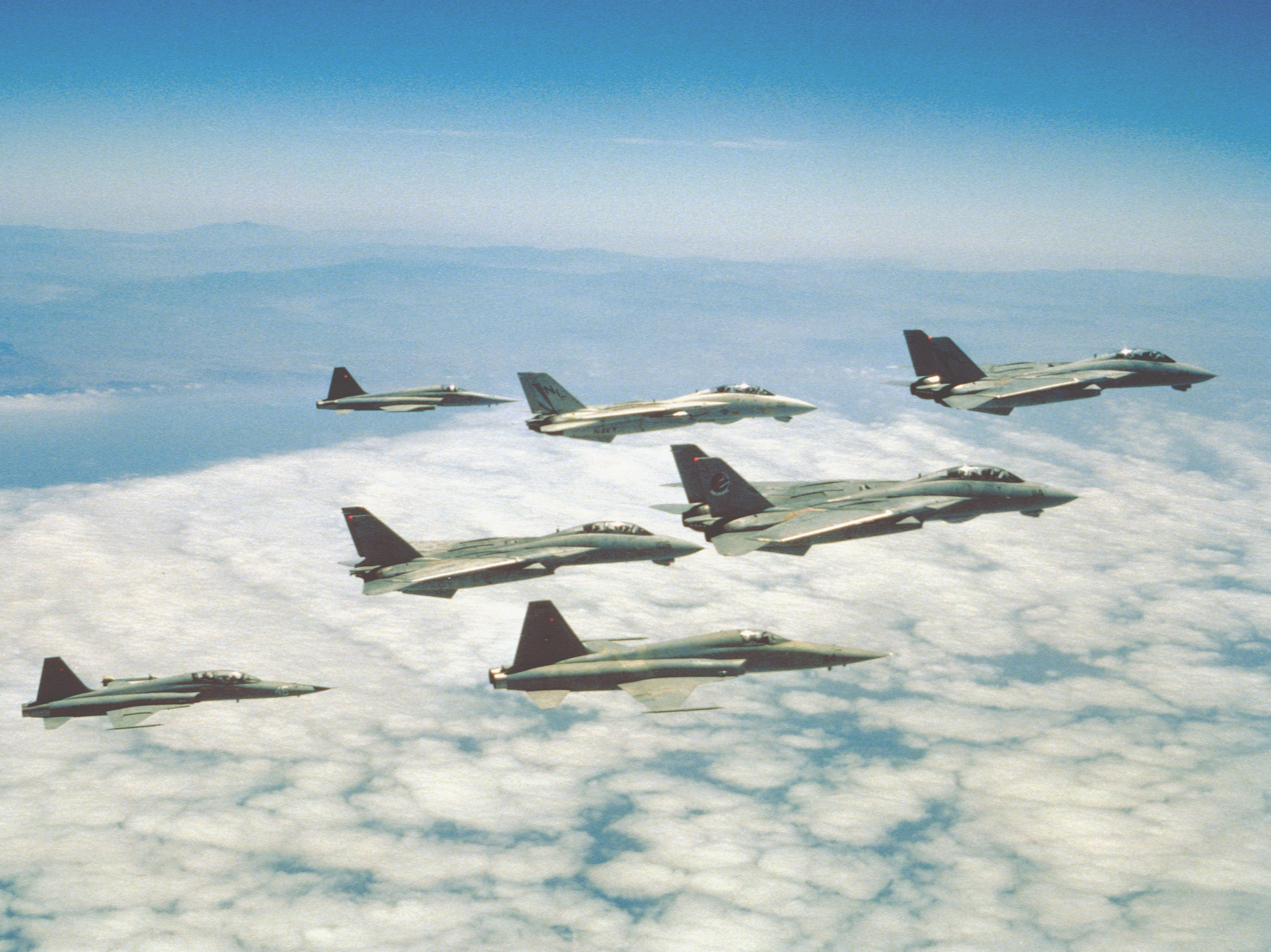
F-14A Tomcats of Fighter Squadrons VF-51 "Screaming Eagles" and VF-111 "Sundowners", and F-5E/F Tiger IIs of the Navy Fighter Weapons School, 1985

Filming began in Oceanside, California, on June 26, 1985, later moving to Miramar to begin shooting scenes on the aircraft. The Navy made aircraft and crew from Carrier Air Wing Fifteen (CVW-15) available for the movie, which then consisted of F-14 squadrons VF-51 "Screaming Eagles" (which Mike "Viper" Metcalf mentions in the scene at his home) and VF-111 "Sundowners" (which was referenced by Marcus "Sundown" Williams' callsign and helmet design). Paramount paid as much as US$7,800 per hour (equivalent to $22,100 in 2023) for fuel and other operating costs whenever aircraft were flown outside their normal duties. After filming wrapped up, one of the aircraft used (BuNo 160694) was sent to the USS Lexington Museum in Corpus Christi, Texas, where it resides today. Aside from the aircraft of CVW-15, F-14s of other squadrons made background appearances. Aircraft of VF-114 "Aardvarks" and VF-213 "Blacklions" appear in shots of the carrier sequences filmed aboard the Enterprise, while the fleet of VF-1 "Wolfpack" is visible in shots taken at Miramar. The majority of the carrier flight deck shots were of normal aircraft operations and the film crew had to take what they could get, save for the occasional flyby which the film crew would request. During filming, director Tony Scott wanted to film aircraft landing and taking off, back-lit by the sun. During one particular filming sequence, the ship's commanding officer changed the ship's course, thus changing the light. When Scott asked if they could continue on their previous course and speed, he was informed by the commander that it cost US$25,000 (equivalent to $71,000 in 2023) to turn the ship, and to continue on course. Scott wrote the carrier's captain a check so that the ship could be turned and he could continue shooting for another five minutes.

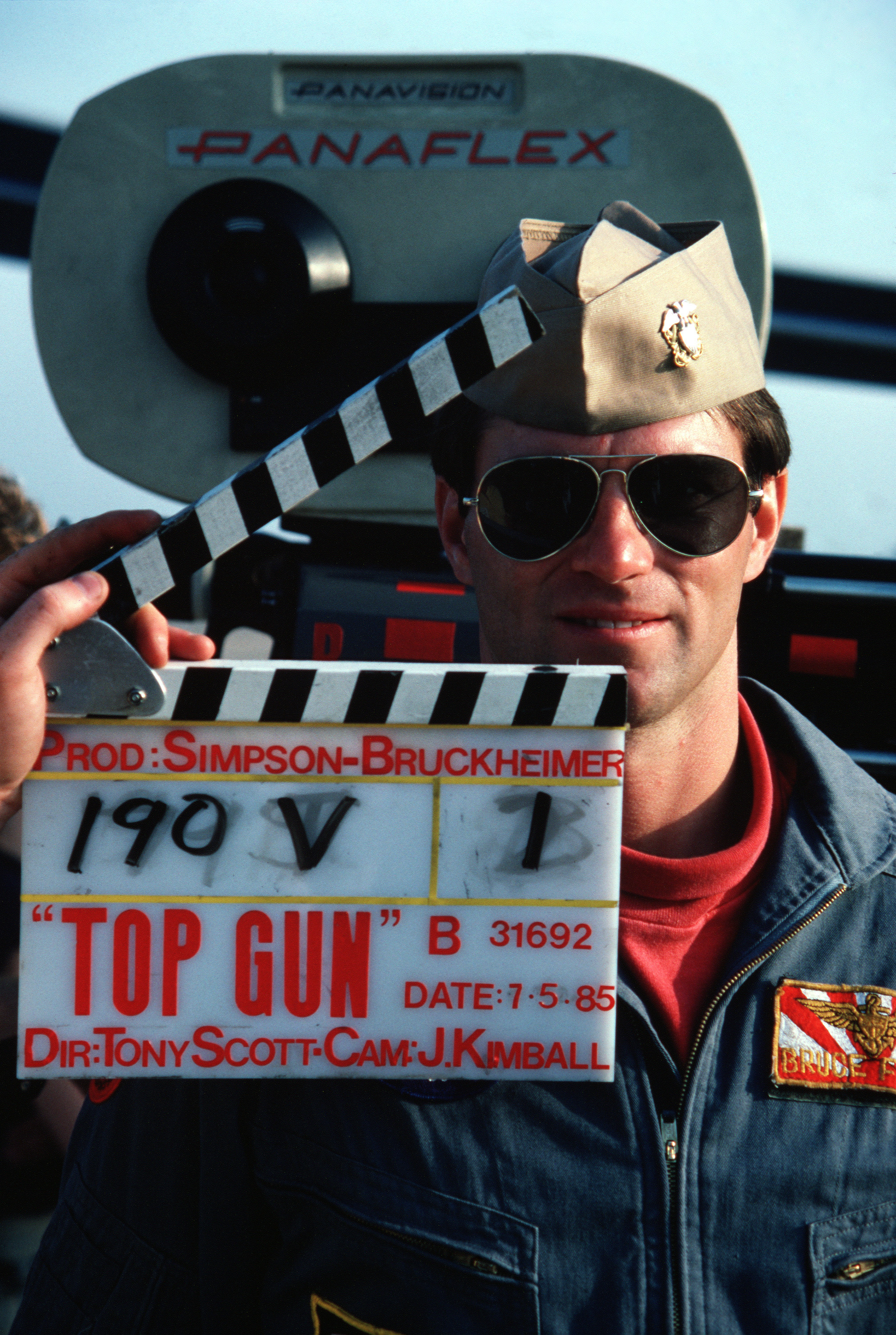
Filming and clapperboard of Top Gun on July 5, 1985

Future NASA astronaut Scott Altman was among the pilots of VF-51 who flew F-14 aircraft for many of the film's stunt sequences, having been recently stationed at NAS Miramar at the time of filming. Altman was the pilot seen "flipping the bird" in the film's well-known opening sequence, as well as piloting the aircraft shown "buzzing the tower" throughout the film. The infamous "buzzing the tower" sequence raised concern among residents who called the base and local news media to report a "berserk pilot".

Most of the sequences of the aircraft maneuvering over land were shot at Naval Air Station Fallon, in Nevada, using ground-mounted cameras. The majority of air-to-air filming was done using a Learjet. The F-14s also had cameras mounted both inside the cockpit and on six external camera mounts, which were originally built by Grumman for filming The Final Countdown, an earlier movie that also featured F-14s, and modified for use on Top Gun.

The fictitious MIG-28 enemy aircraft was depicted by the Northrop F-5.

The film was shot in the Super 35 format, as anamorphic lenses were too large to fit inside the cockpits of the fighter jets.

Reshoots after Top Gun's filming wrapped conflicted with Made in Heaven, in which McGillis starred with brown hair. Top Gun's filmmakers were forced to hide her hair color, which for example resulted in the scene shot in an elevator featured McGillis in a baseball cap. While filming her scenes, McGillis had to be shoeless to match Cruise's height.

Renowned aerobatic pilot Art Scholl was hired to do in-flight camera work for the film. The original script called for a flat spin, which Scholl was to perform and capture on a camera on the aircraft. The aircraft was observed to spin through its recovery altitude, at which time Scholl radioed, "I have a problem... I have a real problem". He was unable to recover from the spin and crashed his Pitts Special biplane into the Pacific Ocean off the Southern California coast near Carlsbad on September 16, 1985. Neither Scholl's body nor his aircraft were recovered, leaving the official cause of the accident unknown. The film was dedicated to Scholl's memory.

==== Locations ====
The San Diego restaurant and bar Kansas City Barbeque served as a filming location for two scenes shot in July 1985. The first scene features Goose and Maverick singing "Great Balls of Fire" while seated at the piano. The final scene, where "You've Lost That Lovin' Feelin'" can be heard on the restaurant's Wurlitzer jukebox, was also filmed at the restaurant. Both scenes were filmed consecutively. After the release of the movie, the restaurant went on to collect a significant amount of memorabilia from the motion picture until a kitchen fire on June 26, 2008, destroyed much of the restaurant. Some memorabilia and props, including the original piano used in the film, survived the fire, and the restaurant re-opened in November 2008.

In 1985, Paramount Pictures rented the Graves House, now commonly called the Top Gun House, a historic Oceanside Folk Victorian/Queen Anne cottage located at 102 North Pacific Street, and used it as the home of Charlotte 'Charlie' Blackwood. Charlie's backyard scenes were filmed at another house located at 112 First Street (Seagaze Drive) that was behind The Graves House. In May 2020, The Graves House was relocated and later renovated into a pie shop called High Pie located at 250 North Pacific Street.

== Music ==
The Top Gun soundtrack is one of the most popular soundtracks to date, reaching 9× Platinum certification and No. 1 on the Billboard 200 albums chart for five non-consecutive weeks in the summer and fall of 1986. Harold Faltermeyer, who previously collaborated with both Jerry Bruckheimer and Don Simpson on Beverly Hills Cop, was sent the script of Top Gun by Bruckheimer before filming began. Giorgio Moroder and Tom Whitlock worked on numerous songs including the Academy Award-winning "Take My Breath Away". Kenny Loggins performed two songs on the soundtrack, "Playing with the Boys", and "Danger Zone". Berlin recorded the song "Take My Breath Away", which would later win numerous awards, sending the band to international acclaim. After the release of Loggins's single "Danger Zone", sales of the album exploded, selling 7 million in the United States alone. On the re-release of the soundtrack in 2000, two songs that had been omitted from the original album (and had been released many years before the film was made), "Great Balls of Fire" by Jerry Lee Lewis and "You've Lost That Lovin' Feelin'" by The Righteous Brothers, were added. The soundtrack also includes "Top Gun Anthem" and "Memories" by Faltermeyer, with Steve Stevens also performing on the former.

Other artists were considered for the soundtrack project but did not participate. Bryan Adams was considered as a potential candidate but refused to participate because he felt the film glorified war. The band Toto was originally meant to record "Danger Zone", and had also written and recorded a song "Only You" for the soundtrack. However, there was a dispute between Toto's lawyers and the producers of the film, paving the way for Loggins to record "Danger Zone" and "Only You" being omitted from the film entirely.

In 2024, the specialized film music label La-La Land Records released a two-CD set of the soundtrack. The second disc contains the same tracks that have been made available on previous editions. But the first disc contains the complete instrumental score by Harold Faltermeyer which is officially available for the first time (only the "Top Gun Anthem" ended on the first edition of the soundtrack album with the "Memories" track added years later on the expanded and deluxe editions).

== Release ==
=== Theatrical ===
The film's premiere was held in New York City on May 12, 1986, with another held in San Diego on May 15.

The film opened in the United States and Canada in 1,028 theaters on May 16, 1986, a week prior to the Memorial Day weekend, which was considered a gamble at the time.

=== Home media ===
In addition to its box office success, Top Gun went on to break further records in the then still-developing home video market. It was the first new-release blockbuster on VHS to be priced as low as $26.95 and, backed by a massive $8 million marketing campaign, including a Top Gun-themed Diet Pepsi commercial, the advance demand was such that the film became the best-selling VHS in the industry's history on pre-orders alone, with over 1.9 million units ordered before its launch on March 11, 1987. It eventually sold a record 2.9 million units. It was also CIC Video's best seller worldwide outside the US and Canada at the time with international sales of $20 million. In 1995, the film premiered on a THX certified LaserDisc with a Dolby Digital AC-3 track. A Widescreen VHS release was released on September 10, 1996.

The film was first released in the U.S. on DVD under Paramount Pictures on October 20, 1998, and included the film in both Widescreen (non-anamorphic Univisium 2.00:1) and Full Screen (open matte) versions. Top Gun's home video success was again reflected by strong DVD sales, which were furthered by a Special Collector's Edition 2-disc DVD release on December 14, 2004, in both Widescreen (anamorphic 2.39:1) and Full Screen (open matte) versions, that include new bonus features. Special features comprise audio commentary by Bruckheimer, Tony Scott and naval experts, four music videos including the "Top Gun Anthem" and "Take My Breath Away", a six-part documentary on the making of Top Gun, and vintage gallery with interviews, behind-the-scenes and survival training featurettes.

Subsequently, the film was first released on a Special Collector's Edition Blu-ray disc on July 29, 2008, with the same supplemental features as the previous 2004 DVD. A 2-disc limited edition 3D copy was issued on February 19, 2013. The remastered 4K Ultra HD version of the film was released in Digital format on May 13, 2020, with the Blu-ray following on May 19, 2020. It included two new special features titled The Legacy of Top Gun and On Your Six: Thirty Years of Top Gun, with the remaining bonus features carrying over from previous versions.

Top Gun reached number one on the U.K. Official Film Chart based on DVD, Blu-ray, and download sales on the week ending on May 31, 2022.

=== IMAX 3D re-release ===
Top Gun was re-released in IMAX 3D on February 8, 2013, for six days. A four-minute preview of the conversion, featuring the "Danger Zone" flight sequence, was screened at the 2012 International Broadcasting Convention in Amsterdam, Netherlands.

=== 2021 re-release ===
Top Gun was re-released in Dolby Cinema and screened by AMC Theatres on 153 screens on May 13, 2021. On the first weekend it grossed a total of $248,000 ranking at number 10. It grossed a total of $433,000 in a ten-day period.

=== 40th anniversary re-release ===
On May 13, 2026, Paramount would re-release the film for the first time in both immersive premium formats and IMAX in honor of its 40th anniversary, and along with the sequel.

== Reception ==
=== Box office ===
The film quickly became a success and was the highest-grossing film of 1986. It would be six months before its theater count dropped below that of its opening week. It was number one on its first weekend with a gross of $8.2 million, and went on to a total domestic gross of $176.8 million, and $177 million internationally, for a worldwide box office total of $353.8 million. The film sold an estimated 47.65 million tickets in North America in its initial theatrical run.

The film grossed an additional $3 million in its IMAX re-release in 2013, and an additional $471,982 in its 2021 re-release, bringing its domestic gross to $180.3 million and its worldwide gross to $358.3 million.

=== Critical response ===
On Rotten Tomatoes the film has an approval rating of 55% based on reviews from 141 critics. The website's critical consensus states: "Though it features some of the most memorable and electrifying aerial footage shot with an expert eye for action, Top Gun offers too little for non-adolescent viewers to chew on when its characters aren't in the air." On Metacritic, the film has a weighted average score of 50 out of 100 based on 15 critics, indicating "mixed or average reviews". Audiences surveyed by CinemaScore gave the film an average grade of "A" on an A+ to F scale.

Roger Ebert of the Chicago Sun-Times gave the film 2.5 out of 4 stars, saying that:

Movies like Top Gun are hard to review because the good parts are so good and the bad parts are so relentless. The dogfights are absolutely the best since Clint Eastwood's electrifying aerial scenes in Firefox. But look out for the scenes where the people talk to one another.

Gene Siskel of the Chicago Tribune gave the film 3 out of 4 stars, praising the action sequences but criticizing the romantic subplot, writing that "it belongs in a teenage sex-fantasy film and not in a movie that deserves the genuine romantic value of An Officer and a Gentleman". American film critic Pauline Kael commented:

When McGillis is offscreen, the movie is a shiny homoerotic commercial: the pilots strut around the locker room, towels hanging precariously from their waists. It's as if masculinity had been redefined as how a young man looks with his clothes half off, and as if narcissism is what being a warrior is all about.

Some critics have said that the film promotes American jingoism. Filmmaker Oliver Stone told Playboy that the film "sold the idea that war is clean, war can be won… nobody in the movie ever mentions that he just started World War Three!" In 1990, Tom Cruise, while promoting Stone's Born on the Fourth of July, said the film should be taken as a "fairy tale" instead of real depiction of wars and added that it would have been irresponsible to make a sequel because the film gave a misleading view of war. Cruise reprised his role in the sequel 36 years later, this time to mostly positive reviews. Val Kilmer, who was critical of warmongering in the first film, also returned for the sequel.

Journalist and former F-14 RIO Ward Carroll considered the movie iconic and culturally relevant, even jokingly referring to it as "the greatest movie ever made". But while conceding the need for narrative and cinematographic liberties, he felt that the film had several "cringe-worthy technical errors that cause it to be as much cartoon as tribute". Carroll identified 79 departures from naval aviation procedure, technical mistakes, and continuity errors in a 2019 article for Military.com. The YouTube creator LegalEagle posted a video called "Military Laws Broken: Top Gun (with real JAG)", in which the film is reviewed with a veteran Judge Advocate General lawyer, which discusses that the film takes considerable liberties concerning US Military and Naval regulations and laws that are violated. For instance, Maverick's buzzing the air control towers would in real life have likely resulted in his flight status being immediately revoked, while other offenses committed would likely have had the pilot being punished with the death penalty if committed during a time of war.

In 2025, The Hollywood Reporter listed Top Gun as having the best stunts of 1986.

=== Accolades ===
Award	Category	Nominee(s)	Result	Ref.
Academy Awards	Best Film Editing	Billy Weber and Chris Lebenzon	Nominated	
Academy Awards	Best Original Song	"Take My Breath Away"; Music by Giorgio Moroder; Lyrics by Tom Whitlock	Won	
Academy Awards	Best Sound	Donald O. Mitchell, Kevin O'Connell, Rick Kline, and William B. Kaplan	Nominated	
Academy Awards	Best Sound Effects Editing	Cecelia Hall and George Watters II	Nominated	
ASCAP Film and Television Music Awards	Top Box Office Films	Harold Faltermeyer	Won	
ASCAP Film and Television Music Awards	Most Performed Songs from Motion Pictures	"Take My Breath Away"; Music by Giorgio Moroder; Lyrics by Tom Whitlock	Won	
Brit Awards	Best Soundtrack	Top Gun	Won	
Golden Globe Awards	Best Original Score – Motion Picture	Harold Faltermeyer	Nominated	
Golden Globe Awards	Best Original Song – Motion Picture	"Take My Breath Away"; Music by Giorgio Moroder; Lyrics by Tom Whitlock	Won	
Golden Reel Awards	Best Sound Editing – ADR	Andy Patterson and Juno J. Ellis	Won	
Golden Reel Awards	Best Sound Editing – Sound Effects		Won	
Golden Screen Awards			Won	
Grammy Awards	Best Pop Instrumental Performance (Orchestra, Group or Soloist)	"Top Gun Anthem" – Harold Faltermeyer and Steve Stevens	Won	
Grammy Awards	Best Instrumental Composition	"Top Gun Anthem" – Harold Faltermeyer	Nominated	
Japan Academy Film Prize	Outstanding Foreign Language Film		Nominated	
National Film Preservation Board	National Film Registry		Inducted	
People's Choice Awards	Favorite Motion Picture		Won	

- In 2008, the film was ranked at number 455 in Empire's list of the 500 greatest films of all time.
- Yahoo! Movies ranked Top Gun number 19 on their list of greatest action films of all time.

American Film Institute list

- AFI's 100 Years...100 Movie Quotes:
  - "I feel the need—the need for speed." – #94

== Influence ==
Film producer John Davis said that Top Gun was a recruiting video for the Navy, and that people saw the movie and said, "Wow! I want to be a pilot." The Navy had recruitment booths in some theaters to attract enthusiastic patrons. After the film's release, a popular claim arose that the number of young men who joined the Navy wanting to be naval aviators went up by 500%; however, its accuracy has since been disputed, with modern analyses indicating a more modest total Navy enlistment increase of 8%. The film helped rehabilitate the military's image following the Vietnam War.

The U.S. Department of Defense Office of Inspector General blamed sexist behavior depicted in Top Gun for making sexual assault more likely in the real-life military, contributing to the Tailhook scandal in 1991.

In December 2024, Tom Cruise was awarded the Distinguished Public Service Award, which is the highest civilian honor given to private citizens by the US Navy for his "outstanding contributions" to the military through his appearances in military-related film.

The film inspired Misa Matsushima to become the first female fighter pilot in Japan. While Japan's Air Force started recruiting women in 1993, they were allowed only to be reconnaissance aircraft pilots. When the restriction was lifted in 2015, Matsushima immediately enrolled. "Ever since I saw the movie when I was in primary school," explained Matsushima, "I have always admired fighter jet pilots."

== In popular culture ==
The 1991 film Hot Shots! was a comedy spoof of Top Gun.

Top Gun is one of many war and action films, especially those by Bruckheimer, parodied in the 2004 comedy Team America: World Police.

Top Gun, along with A Few Good Men, is recognized for being an inspiration for the TV series Supercarrier, Pensacola: Wings of Gold, JAG and the subsequent NCIS franchise in turn. JAG and NCIS are also owned by Paramount.

The DisneyToon Studios film Planes (2013) pays homage to Top Gun with Kilmer and Edwards appearing in the film as part of the voice cast.

Two Chinese war films, Sky Fighters (2011) and Sky Hunter (2017), were based on Top Gun.

On January 23, 2011, China's state broadcaster China Central Television (CCTV) published a TV news story about the claimed efficiency of Chinese fighter pilots which incorporated footage from the Top Gun action sequences. Chinese internet users noticed the plagiarism, whereupon the broadcast was immediately withdrawn. CCTV has declined comments on this incident.

The film was parodied in the episode "Fat Gun", as part of the twenty-third season of the Seth MacFarlane animated sitcom Family Guy.

== Sequel ==
A sequel, Top Gun: Maverick, was released on May 27, 2022, to critical and commercial success. The sequel had been in active development since at least 2010. By September 2014, it was revealed that Justin Marks was in negotiations to write the screenplay, which was confirmed in June 2015. In May 2017, during the promotional tour for The Mummy, Cruise confirmed that a sequel to Top Gun would start filming in 2018. In June 2017, Cruise revealed that the sequel's title would be Top Gun: Maverick, with Faltermeyer returning as composer for the film. Scott was originally intended to return to direct the sequel, but had died by suicide on August 19, 2012. Also in June 2017, it was announced that Joseph Kosinski, who directed Cruise in 2013's Oblivion, was set to direct—with Maverick dedicated to Scott's memory—and Kilmer was announced to reprise his role as Iceman. McGillis was not asked to return for the sequel, but appears in the film via archive footage. The Bradshaw family—Edwards, Ryan and the Weis twins—also appear via archive footage, while Miles Teller plays their now-adult son, LT Bradley "Rooster" Bradshaw.

== Video games ==
Top Gun also spawned a number of video games for various platforms, while "I feel the need—the need for speed" started the car race series with The Need For Speed.

The original game was released in 1986 under the same title as the film. It was released on Commodore 64, ZX Spectrum, Amstrad CPC, and Atari ST. Another game, also titled Top Gun, was released in 1987 for Nintendo Entertainment System (NES) and Nintendo VS. System arcade cabinets. In the 1987 game, the player pilots an F-14 Tomcat fighter, and has to complete four missions. A sequel, Top Gun: The Second Mission, was released for the NES three years later.

Another game, Top Gun: Fire at Will, was released in 1996 for the PC and later for the Sony PlayStation platform. Top Gun: Hornet's Nest was released in 1998. Top Gun: Combat Zones was released for PlayStation 2 in 2001 and was subsequently released for the GameCube and Microsoft Windows. Combat Zones features other aircraft besides the F-14. In 2006, another game simply titled Top Gun was released for the Nintendo DS. A 2010 game, also titled Top Gun, retells the film's story. At E3 2011, a new game was announced, Top Gun: Hard Lock, which was released in March 2012 for Xbox 360, PC, and PlayStation 3.

== See also ==
- List of media set in San Diego
- List of cult films
- Aircraft in fiction

== Bibliography ==
- Jordan, Meredith (2022). Top Gun Memos: The Making and Legacy of an Iconic Movie. Citation Press. ISBN 9781733787437. OCLC 1321076730.
