= WYNC =

- Yanceyville, North Carolina; United States
- Frequency: 1540 kHz

Programming
- Format: Gospel

Ownership
- Owner: True Word Media Inc.

History
- Call sign meaning: W Yanceyville

Technical information
- Licensing authority: FCC
- Facility ID: 59673
- Class: D
- Power: 2,500 watts day 1,000 watts critical hours
- Transmitter coordinates: 36°24′52.5″N 79°20′5.1″W

Links
- Public license information: Public file; LMS
- Webcast: Listen Live
- Website: wyncgospelam1540.org

WYNC (1540 AM) is a radio station broadcasting a gospel music format. Licensed to Yanceyville, North Carolina, United States, the station is owned by True Word Media Inc.
