= Yanceyville Municipal Airport =

Coordinates: 36°23′59″N 079°23′34″W

Yanceyville Municipal Airport (FAA LID: 6W4) is a small public airport located about 2 miles (3.2 km) west of Yanceyville, North Carolina, occupying 10 acres of land.

== Airport information ==
=== Services ===
Yanceyville Municipal Airport serves general aviation, which includes private planes and small aircraft.

=== Runway ===
The airport has one runway, designated as 04/22, which is a turf runway measuring 1,735 feet (529 m) long and 150 feet (46 m) wide. The numbers 04 and 22 refer to the runway's direction, with 04 being approximately northeast and 22 being approximately southwest. The runway elevations are 621 feet (189 m) at the 04 end and 648 feet (197 m) at the 22 end.
