= John Johnston House (Yanceyville, North Carolina) =

Historic house in North Carolina, United States

- U.S. National Register of Historic Places
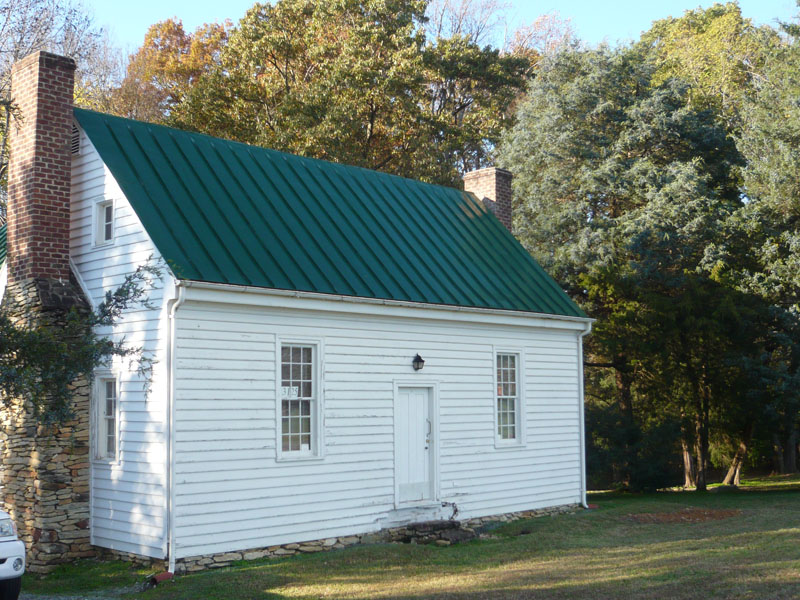

- Location within North Carolina Location within the United States
- Location: 1325 NC 62, N., near Yanceyville, North Carolina
- Coordinates: 36°26′8″N 79°16′59″W
- Area: 2.3 acres (0.93 ha)
- Built: c. 1825
- Architectural style: Federal
- NRHP reference No.: 97000238
- Added to NRHP: March 14, 1997

John Johnston House is a historic home located near Yanceyville, Caswell County, North Carolina. It was built about 1825, and is a two-story, three bay by two bay, hall-and-parlor plan frame dwelling with Federal style architectural details. A one-story rear ell was added in 1990. It was moved 150 yards (140 m) to its present location about 1921.

It was added to the National Register of Historic Places in 1997.
