= Piedmont Community College =

College in Roxboro, North Carolina, United States

Coordinates: 36.4318°N 78.9804°W

- Type: Public community college
- Established: 1970
- Parent institution: North Carolina Community College System
- President: Kevin E. Lee
- Location: Roxboro, North Carolina, United States
- Colors: Forest Green and White
- Nickname: PCC
- Mascot: Pacer
- Website: www.piedmontcc.edu

Piedmont Community College (PCC) is a public community college in Roxboro, North Carolina. It is part of the North Carolina Community College System. It serves Person County, where its main campus is located, and Caswell County, which hosts a branch campus in Yanceyville.

Founded in 1970, the college serves students through its curriculum programs, which lead to associate degrees, diplomas, and certificates. Over 8,900 people are served annually through the college’s programs.

== History ==
PCC was established on July 1, 1970, and was originally named Person County Technical Institute. It was founded through the efforts of progressive-minded citizens in Person County who sought to create a local institution for higher education and job training.

Key milestones in the college's history include:

- 1970: The college opened with its first full-time students (266 enrolled in September).
- 1971: The name changed to Piedmont Technical Institute.
- 1985: The college expanded its service area to include Caswell County.
- 1987-88: The college’s name changed to Piedmont Community College (PCC).
- 1988: The Caswell County campus opened.
- 2000: PCC curriculum enrollment increased by 40% over four years, marking significant growth.
- 2020: PCC celebrated 50 years of education.
- 2024: PCC saw its highest enrollment growth in 10 years, 13%.

== Presidents ==
- Craven H. Sumerell, 1970–1973
- Edward W. Cox, 1973–1987
- H. James Owen, 1987 - June 2009
- Walter C. Bartlett, July 2009 – July 2017
- Pamela G. Senegal, July 2017 – February 2025
- Kenneth Boham (interim), March 2025 – August 2025
- Kevin E. Lee, August 2025 – Present

== Academics ==
Students at PCC can earn associate degrees and certificates in 27 fields of study, with popular programs including Liberal Arts and Sciences/Liberal Studies, Registered Nursing, and Medical/Clinical Assistant. The college also provides a transfer program for students aiming to pursue bachelor's degrees at four-year institutions. Additionally, high school students have the opportunity to access college-level instruction through special programs established by the NC General Assembly.

PCC is accredited by the Southern Association of Colleges and Schools Commission on Colleges (SACSCOC) to award associate degrees, diplomas, and certificates.

== Campuses ==
=== Main campus ===
The main campus is located at 1715 College Drive in Roxboro near Northern Middle School and spans 178 acres. It consists of 13 buildings, most of which contain classrooms and faculty offices. Other buildings include Student Services, a bookstore, a learning resource center, and a child care facility. The campus also features specialized facilities, such as science and technology labs, a welding lab, a 2,300-square-foot auditorium, and a 3,000-square-foot multi-purpose room with a kitchen.

==== Business Development & Entrepreneurship Center ====
The Business Development and Entrepreneurship Center (BDEC) is located in uptown Roxboro. It provides business counseling and services for businesses in the early stages of development. The center also houses the Small Business Center, an employability lab, and Career and College Readiness (CCR) programs.

==== Center for Health, Advanced Technology and Trades ====
The Center for Health, Advanced Technology, and Trades (CHATT) is a planned facility under construction in 2025 in Timberlake. It will include a hospital simulation and training area, modern manufacturing equipment, and expanded space, designed to serve as a state-of-the-art facility. The additional space will support programs such as welding and advanced manufacturing, enabling the college to accommodate more students and offer a safer training environment.

=== Caswell County campus ===
The Caswell County campus is located at 331 Piedmont Drive in Yanceyville, just off NC 62, and spans 15 acres. It consists of two buildings: Building K, which houses administration, Student Development, a snack bar, the Learning Commons, offices, labs, a lactation room, classrooms, and an employability lab; and Building P, which contains offices, labs, and classrooms.

The campus serves both adult learners and high school students. Adults can pursue courses and programs for personal and professional growth, while high school students can participate in the Career and College Promise (CCP) program to earn a certificate, diploma, or an associate’s degree. Its proximity to Bartlett Yancey High School further enhances educational opportunities for local students.

=== Future campus ===
==== Center for Educational and Agricultural Development ====
The Center for Educational and Agricultural Development (CEAD) is a future campus in Pelham with a 2026 occupancy target. CEAD will house the Agribusiness Technology Program and serve as a hub for agricultural education and community resources.

The first phase, fully funded and launched in 2022, includes a food hub in partnership with 4P Foods and incubator farm plots for students and community members. Future plans include an education building, the youth agriculture program BLAST!, a welding and small engine repair lab, a health clinic, an ADA-compliant emergency shelter, food retail opportunities, and walking trails.
