= Bartlett Yancey House =

Historic house in North Carolina, United States

- U.S. National Register of Historic Places
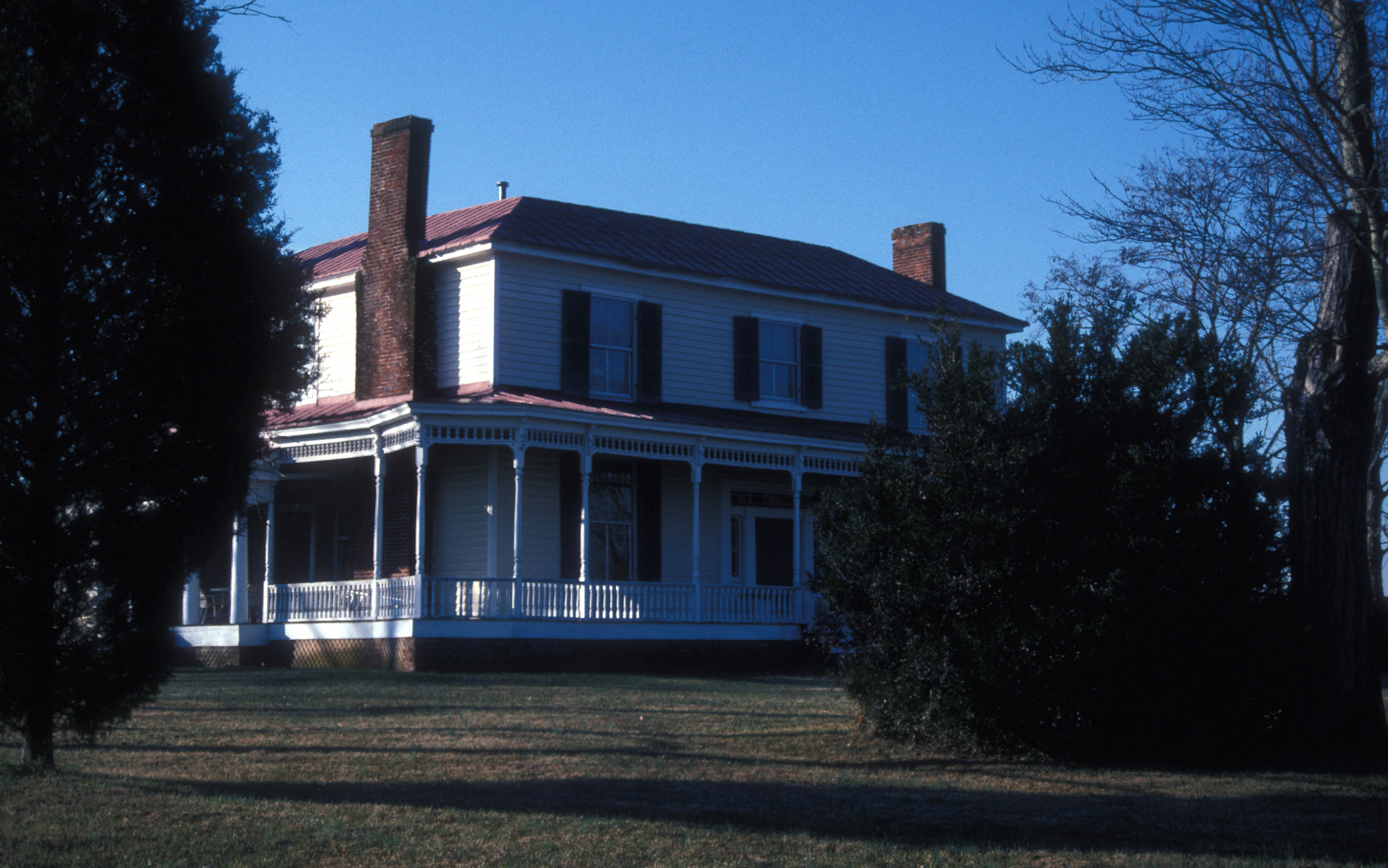
- Bartlett Yancey House, July 1971

- Location within North Carolina Location within the United States
- Nearest city: Yanceyville, North Carolina
- Coordinates: 36.41606°N 79.36254°W
- Area: 9.9 acres (4.0 ha)
- Built: c. 1810, 1856
- Architectural style: Greek Revival, Federal
- NRHP reference No.: 73001310
- Added to NRHP: December 4, 1973

Bartlett Yancey House is a historic home located in Yanceyville, Caswell County, North Carolina. It consists of a two-story L-shaped Greek Revival block added to the front of the original Federal house in 1856. The original section was built around 1810. It features a Victorian overlay of front and side porches added late 19th century. Also on the property are the original smokehouse, a Federal period law office, several log tobacco barns, and the Yancey family graveyard. It was the home of Congressman Bartlett Yancey (1785-1828).

It was added to the National Register of Historic Places in 1973.
