= Yanceyville Historic District =

Historic district in North Carolina, United States

- U.S. National Register of Historic Places
- U.S. Historic district
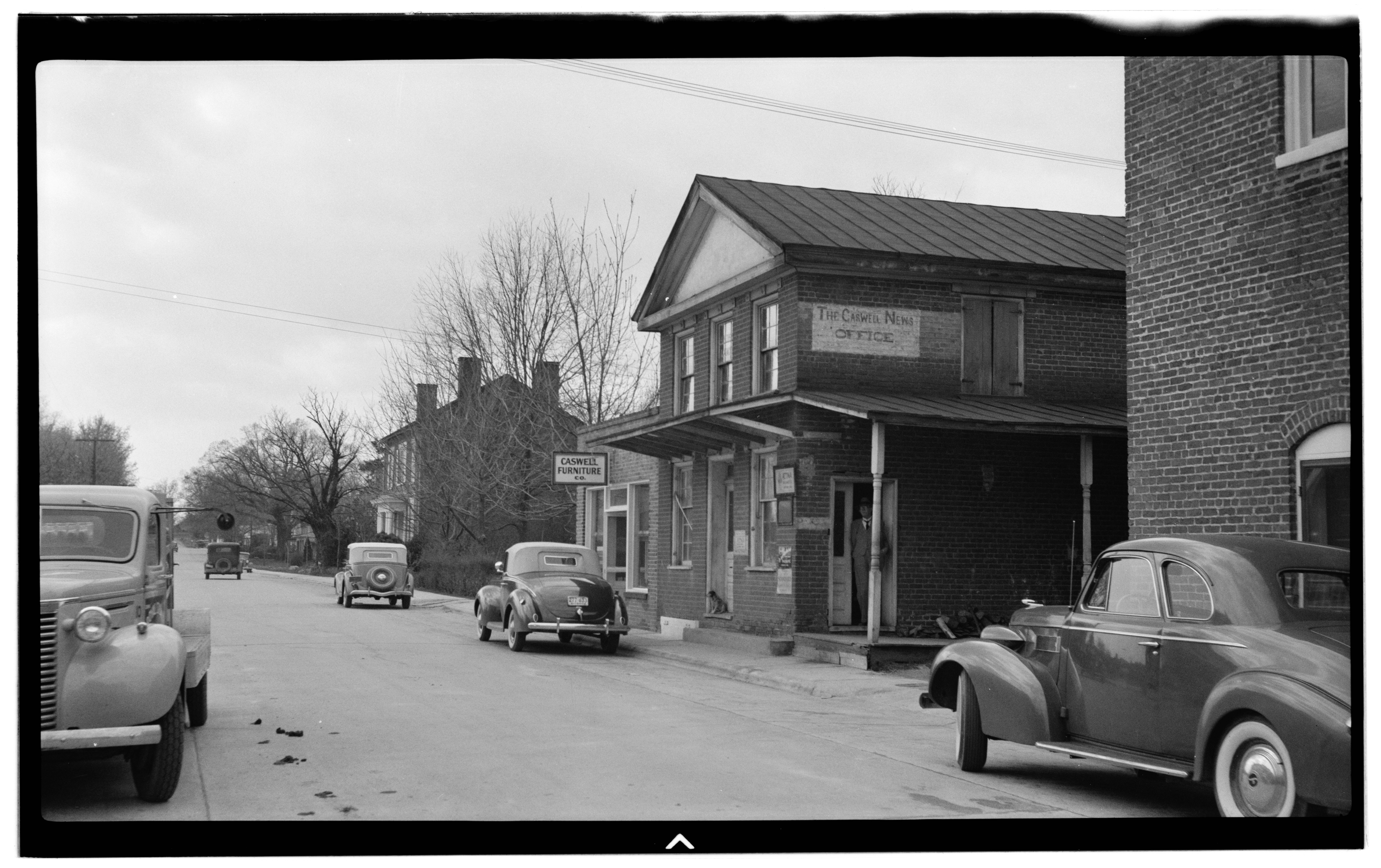
- West Main Street

- Location within North Carolina Location within the United States
- Location: W. Main St., Courthouse Sq., and North Ave. to Church St., Yanceyville, North Carolina
- Coordinates: 36°24′19″N 79°20′27″W
- Area: 30 acres (12 ha)
- Built: c. 1830
- Architect: Multiple
- Architectural style: Greek Revival
- NRHP reference No.: 73001311
- Added to NRHP: October 15, 1973

Yanceyville Historic District is a national historic district located in Yanceyville, Caswell County, North Carolina, USA. It encompasses 11 contributing buildings in the county seat of Yanceyville. It includes notable examples of Greek Revival style architecture. In addition to the separately listed Caswell County Courthouse, other notable buildings include the Thornton House, Paul Haralson House, Jeremiah Graves House (Dongola), Dr. Nathaniel Roan House, Presbyterian Church, Kerr House, Thomas D. Johnston House, and the brick store.

It was added to the National Register of Historic Places in 1973.
