= William Henry and Sarah Holderness House =

Historic house in North Carolina, United States

- U.S. National Register of Historic Places
- Location within North Carolina Location within the United States
- Location: 3082 US 158 W., near Yanceyville, North Carolina
- Coordinates: 36°23′44″N 79°23′16″W
- Area: 6.74 acres (2.73 ha)
- Built: c. 1855
- Built by: Day, Thomas
- Architectural style: Greek Revival
- NRHP reference No.: 14000982
- Added to NRHP: December 2, 2014

William Henry and Sarah Holderness House, also known as the Holderness-Paschal-Page House, is a historic plantation house located near Yanceyville, Caswell County, North Carolina. It was built about 1855, and is a two-story, Greek Revival style frame dwelling. It consists of a three-bay, hip roofed, main block flanked by one-story, one-bay side wings. The front facade features a pedimented one-bay Greek Revival-style porch, also found on the wing entrances. The interior features architectural woodwork by Thomas Day. Also on the property are the contributing smokehouse (c. 1855) and carriage house (c. 1855).

It was listed on the National Register of Historic Places in 2014.
