= Caswell County Courthouse =

Historic courthouse in North Carolina, US

- U.S. National Register of Historic Places
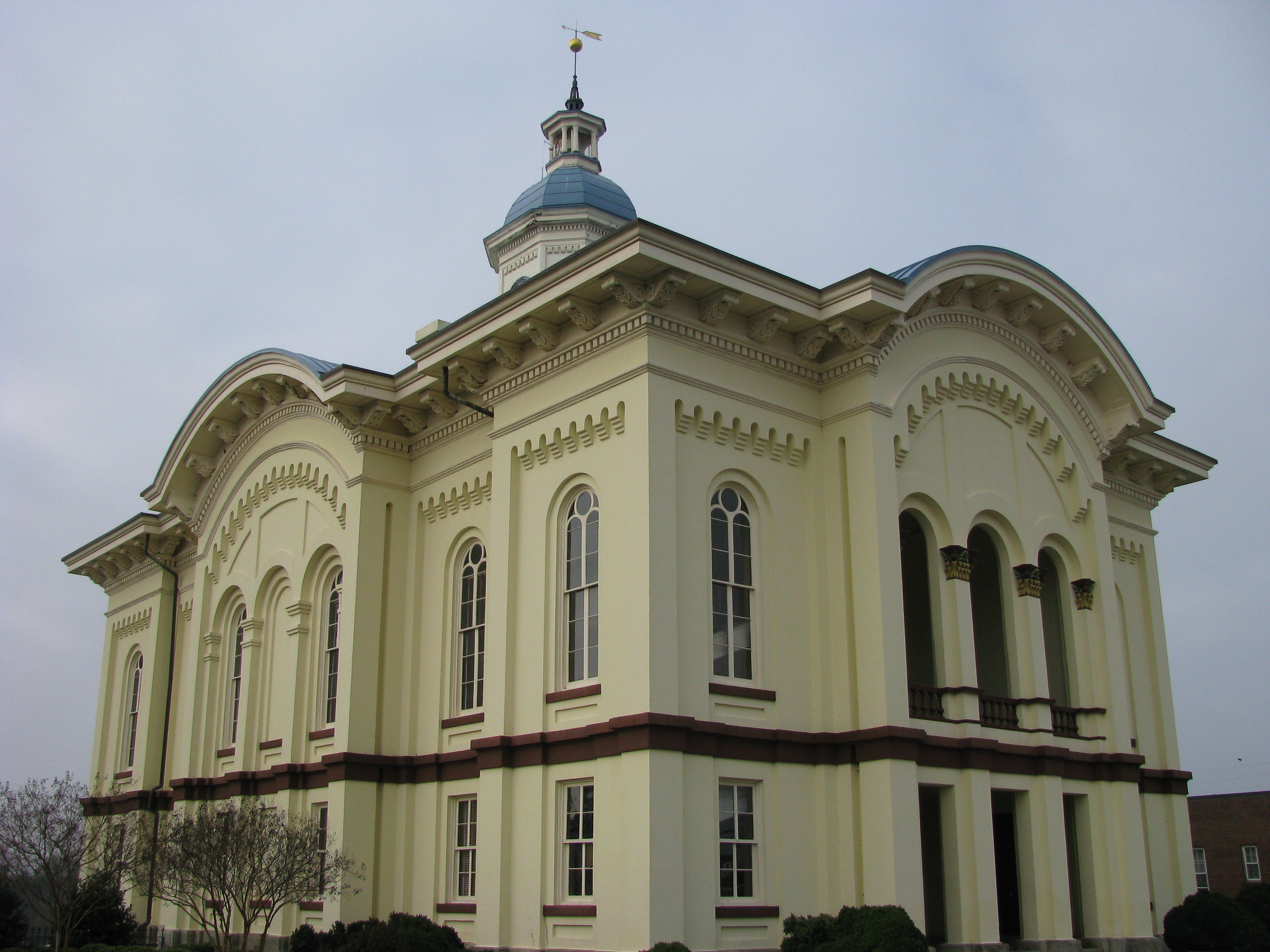
- Caswell County Courthouse, March 2009

- Location within North Carolina Location within the United States
- Location: Courthouse Sq., Yanceyville, North Carolina
- Coordinates: 36°24′11″N 79°20′11″W
- Area: less than one acre
- Built: 1858-1861
- Architect: William Percival
- NRHP reference No.: 73001309
- Added to NRHP: June 4, 1973

Caswell County Courthouse is a historic county courthouse located in Yanceyville, Caswell County, North Carolina. It was built between 1858 and 1861, and is a rectangular two-story, stuccoed brick building, five bays wide and seven deep. It sits on an elevated granite block foundation and features a two-level recessed entrance porch and octagonal cupola.

State Senator John W. Stephens was assassinated by the Ku Klux Klan in the courthouse on May 21, 1870.

It was added to the National Register of Historic Places in 1973. It is located in the Yanceyville Historic District.
