= Yanceyville, North Carolina =

- Town
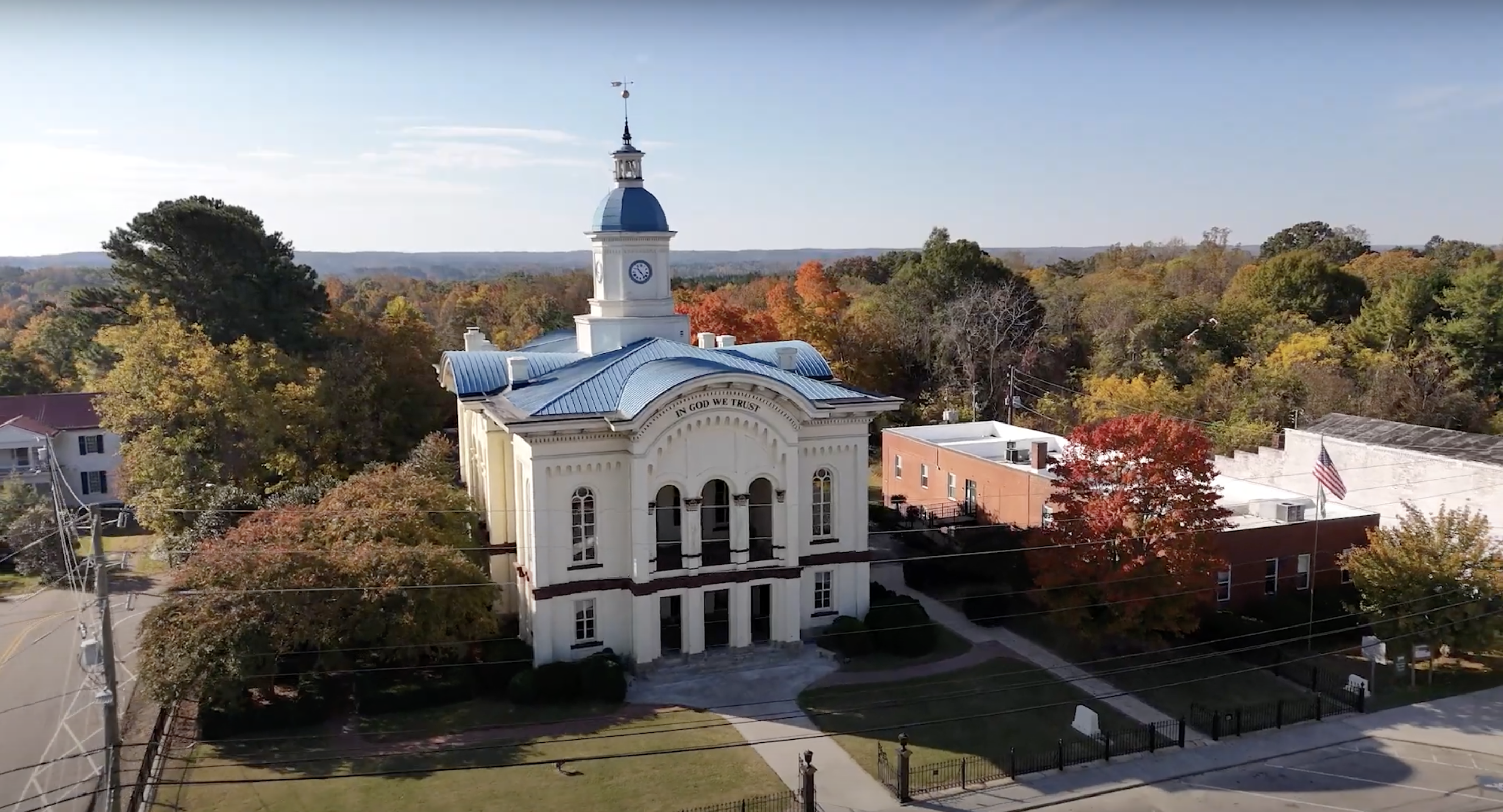
- Old Caswell County Courthouse

- Seal
- Motto: "Tradition with Vision"
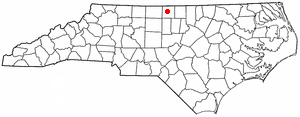
- Location within the state of North Carolina
- Coordinates: 36°24′35″N 79°20′10″W
- Country: United States
- State: North Carolina
- County: Caswell
- Named for: Bartlett Yancey

Government
  - Type: Council–manager
  - Mayor: Alvin Foster

Area
  - Total: 6.96 sq mi (18.03 km^{2})
  - Land: 6.93 sq mi (17.94 km^{2})
  - Water: 0.035 sq mi (0.09 km^{2}) 0.43%
- Elevation: 597 ft (182 m)

Population (2020)
  - Total: 1,937
  - Estimate (2022): 1,965
  - Density: 279.6/sq mi (107.97/km^{2})
- Time zone: UTC−5 (Eastern (EST))
  - Summer (DST): UTC−4 (EDT)
- ZIP code: 27379
- Area code: 336
- FIPS code: 37-76000
- GNIS feature ID: 2406922
- Website: www.yanceyvillenc.gov

Yanceyville is a town in and the county seat of Caswell County, North Carolina, United States. Located in North Carolina's Piedmont Triad region, the town had a population of 1,937 at the 2020 census. Established in 1791 as Caswell Court House, it was renamed in 1833 to honor Bartlett Yancey, a prominent U.S. congressman and advocate for public education.

Historically, Yanceyville served as a hub for Caswell County's agricultural economy, particularly during the 19th century when bright leaf tobacco cultivation brought prosperity to the region. Its central role is reflected in landmarks such as Caswell County Courthouse, an antebellum structure built between 1858 and 1861 and listed on the National Register of Historic Places.

Today, Yanceyville retains a historic core alongside newer civic and commercial development. Educational institutions in the town include Bartlett Yancey High School and a branch campus of Piedmont Community College. Cultural and recreational attractions include Maud F. Gatewood Municipal Park, the Caswell Community Arboretum, and the annual Bright Leaf Hoedown festival.

Yanceyville’s location in the [[Piedmont Triad]] combines a rural setting with proximity to Greensboro, Danville, Virginia, and the Research Triangle.

== History ==
=== Founding and early history ===
When Person County was created out of Caswell County in 1791, the original county seat, Leasburg, was close to the eastern newly formed boundary line dividing the two. Commissioners were named in the county formation act to create a new county seat and courthouse near the geographical center of present Caswell County. Hence, the village of Caswell Court House (later Yanceyville) was founded.

By 1810, the village featured a single store, a hattery, two taverns, and around fifteen homes. Not long thereafter, silversmiths, blacksmiths, wheelwrights, coachmakers, and other tradesmen began opening businesses. Additionally, attorneys, doctors, preachers, and politicians were drawn to the area, contributing to its development.

As Caswell Court House grew, its name was changed to Yanceyville when it was chartered as an incorporated town in 1833. However, its charter was seemingly forgotten and had to be re-obtained from the General Assembly in 1877 and again in 1885. The town's incorporation was repealed in 1899, reinstated in 1905, and repealed once more in 1915. Yanceyville remained unincorporated until 1986, when it was successfully reorganized and incorporated.

=== The name Yanceyville ===
The identity of Yanceyville's namesake has been a subject of historical debate. While the prevailing view attributes the name to U.S. Congressman Bartlett Yancey (1785–1828), some evidence suggests it may honor his older brother, James Yancey (1768–1829), a legislator, merchant, planter, and educator.

In 1977, historian William S. Powell reviewed the evidence and concluded that the town is most likely named after Bartlett Yancey.

=== Caswell County Courthouse ===
Caswell County Courthouse is a historic courthouse, prominent landmark, and center of activity in Yanceyville. Its design combines Italian Romanesque and classical features in a manner unique to North Carolina courthouse architecture. Located in the town's historic district in Court Square, it has been restored and provides offices for county departments.

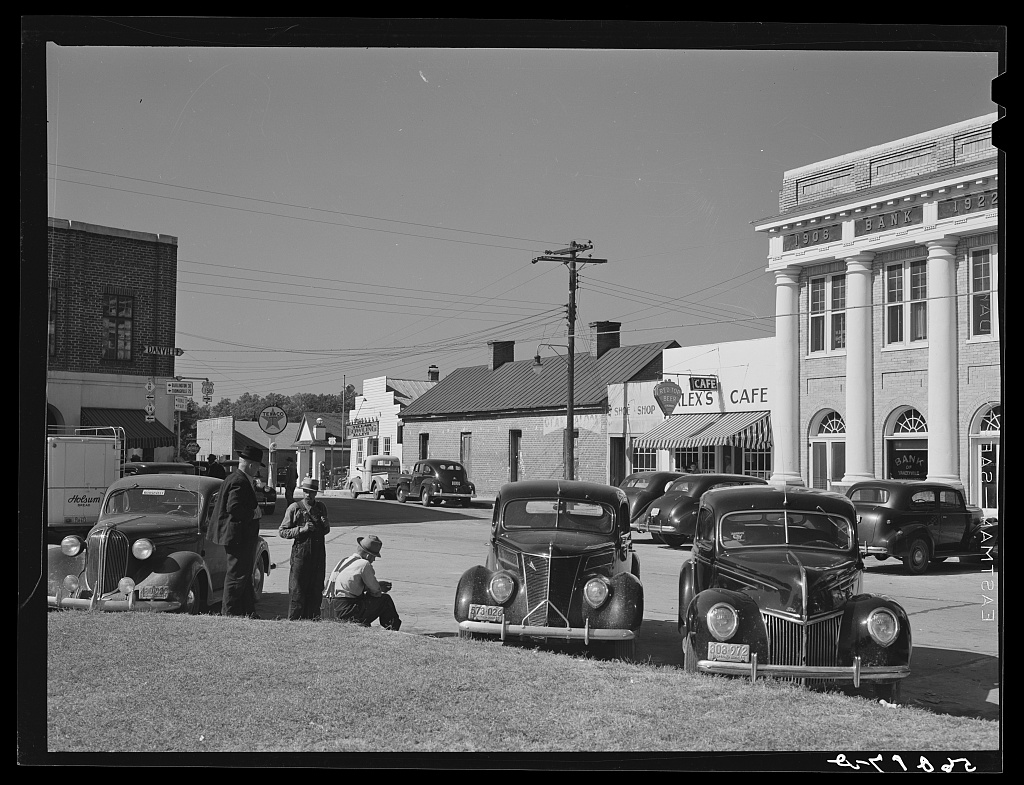
Northwest corner of Court Square, 1940

A new county courthouse was constructed in the mid-1970s and is located a few blocks north of Court Square. Construction of the historic courthouse it replaced began in 1858, during the tail end of the area's prosperous "Boom Era," a period largely driven by bright leaf tobacco cultivation and trade. Built with enslaved labor, the historic courthouse was completed in 1861, amid the early stages of the American Civil War.

=== Economic history (1865–2020s) ===
==== Post–Civil War economy ====
Had Yanceyville not been the county seat, many believe it would have become a ghost town after the Civil War ended in 1865.

In the absence of geographic or commercial advantages—such as a railroad, a major waterway, or major markets—the town relied extensively on agriculture in the surrounding county after the war.

The collapse of the plantation economy severely disrupted agriculture in the region. While there was a brief surge in tobacco output following the war, driven by tenant labor and support from extended family networks, the loss of enslaved labor left many farms insufficiently maintained and unable to sustain prewar levels of productivity.

As the area resumed its dependence on tobacco, soil erosion and gullies became widespread, alongside abandoned land, rising poverty, and social unrest. Grain production decreased and cotton cultivation ended entirely. Industrial growth in the county was largely restricted to tobacco factories and minimal railway infrastructure.

As late 19th-century growth in Danville and Durham began shifting tobacco factories and commerce away from Yanceyville, Leasburg, and Milton, consolidation of the tobacco trade left local growers reliant on external markets. Attempts to develop railroad, textile, hosiery, and furniture enterprises in the area were short‑lived due to scarce capital, weak transport links, and competition from better‑resourced neighbors.

These challenges strained both Yanceyville and the county. Between 1880 and 1900, the county's population declined amid these broader agricultural and economic hardships.

In 1903, in a step toward modernization, the Yanceyville Telephone Company was established to connect the town with surrounding communities, including Milton and Reidsville, as well as with regional hubs such as Danville, Greensboro, and Hillsborough. By 1909, the expansion of telephone infrastructure was a bright spot for Yanceyville.

After 1910, the county's population began to rebound and increased 6.1 percent by 1920. However, longstanding challenges persisted, including:

- Inadequate farming practices, such as shallow plowing and poor crop rotation
- Heavy dependence on tobacco cultivation, resulting in limited crop diversity
- Underdeveloped livestock farming

These issues weakened economic stability by limiting agricultural productivity and degrading soil health, adversely impacting Yanceyville's economic progress through the 1910s.

==== 1917–1940s ====
Despite ongoing economic and agricultural challenges, a strong sense of community solidarity was evident in the area during World War I. Yanceyville's residents united to support the war effort through Red Cross work, military registration, and other activities. Women played a central role in these efforts, while local leaders helped organize resources to assist both soldiers and civilians.

Through the 1920s, the area's population grew. To provide better facilities, the Caswell County Board of Education initiated school improvement projects for both Black and white students. In 1924, these efforts included constructing a new building for Yanceyville School, a school for African American students. Construction was funded through a combination of public and private contributions, including support from the Rosenwald Fund.

In 1926, Yanceyville experienced several notable developments, including the founding of The Caswell Messenger newspaper, the establishment of the Caswell County Chamber of Commerce, and the construction of a county home for the poor.

During the Great Depression, however, farmers and local businesses faced new economic hardships, including falling crop prices and limited credit access. To support the local community, the North Carolina Emergency Relief Administration (NCERA), a state New Deal program, financed projects between 1932 and 1935 to create jobs and improve infrastructure. These efforts included upgrading the courthouse, building a civic center, constructing a water treatment plant, and improving schools.

To further assist the community, the Yanceyville Rotary Club was founded in 1937 and initiated projects to promote economic growth and community development. The town's economy also benefited from the opening of the Caswell Knitting Mill in 1939.

Furthermore, the WPA's road-building initiatives, advancements in agricultural practices beginning in the 1940s, and the impact of World War II had positive effects on the local economy.

==== Mid-20th century to 2020s ====
The economic growth of the 1950s brought new enterprises to the region. From the mid-1950s to the mid-1980s, Yanceyville became home to several textile mills. Royal Textile Mills, for example, restarted operations in 1975 and later supplied major customers, including the U.S. military. This period of expansion enabled the county to diversify its tax base further and benefit from increased public revenue.

In 1975, painter Maud Gatewood, a native of Yanceyville, moved back to Caswell County. The following year, she won election as the county’s first female commissioner and prioritized economic development, land‑use planning, and expanded human services.

In 1986, S.R. Farmer Lake, a 365-acre (148 ha) water supply reservoir with a public recreation area, was completed for Yanceyville. Under an agreement with Caswell County, the town has drawn drinking water from the lake.

In 1988, Piedmont Community College opened a branch campus in Yanceyville. The campus has served adult learners seeking professional development and high school students enrolled in the Career and College Promise program, which offers college credits, certificates, or associate degrees during their secondary education. Its proximity to Bartlett Yancey High School has made vocational and academic pathways for local students more accessible.

In 1995, Yanceyville became involved in the film industry. Zale Magder, a Canadian film producer, invested about $5 million to build a film production complex in the town. Magder promoted a “Hollywood East” concept with on‑site amenities including jogging trails, a golf course, a restaurant, and a fitness center intended to attract filmmakers and movie stars. While Magder Studios declared bankruptcy in 1997, several films and commercials were produced at the location, later known as Carolina Pinnacle Studios. The buildings have since been used for industrial and other non‑film purposes.

In April 1997, the state dedicated the Dan River Prison Work Farm, a minimum-custody facility near Yanceyville with capacity for 650 inmates, and prison managers began moving inmates into the facility. The facility added 165 staff positions, about half of which were filled by Caswell County residents.

At the turn of the 21st century, the area faced challenges, including adapting to the Information Age and managing the decline of the tobacco industry, which was negatively impacting the local economy. At the same time, the town experienced the rise of cultural tourism as an economic driver.

In 2007, Caswell Correctional Center, a medium-custody facility near Yanceyville, employed approximately 188 staff and hosted vocational training provided by Piedmont Community College, adding state jobs and education services to the local economy.

In the 2010s, initiatives such as the 2013 launch of the Caswell County Farmers Market preceded the county’s 2020s launch of the CoSquare coworking hub in downtown Yanceyville.

In October 2018, the county received a $15 million school construction grant from the state. Beginning in June 2020, Bartlett Yancey High School underwent renovations with a projected cost of $35.1 million. The project, which included a new two-story building and campus-wide infrastructure upgrades, was completed under budget in 2022 at a net cost of less than $14 million after the $15 million grant was applied.

In the mid-2020s, broadband initiatives such as the state’s Completing Access to Broadband (CAB) program sought to expand high-speed internet connectivity to Yanceyville and the surrounding county.

A limited number of tobacco farms remain in the area; however, the agriculture-based sector has adapted, with farmers diversifying into a range of other farming practices.

By the 2020s, the local economy, while maintaining its agricultural roots, had further diversified into manufacturing, healthcare, education, food service, retail, and other service industries. While the town’s water and sewer infrastructure needs have been pressing concerns, Yanceyville’s location in the Piedmont Triad, available commercial properties, land ready for development, relatively low property tax rate, and other factors have been cited as supporting business and entrepreneurship.

== Geography ==
Interactive map of Yanceyville town limits

Yanceyville is located at the center of Caswell County. According to the United States Census Bureau, Yanceyville has a total area of 6.96 square miles (18.0 km^{2}), of which 6.93 square miles (17.9 km^{2}) is land and 0.03 square miles (0.078 km^{2}) (0.43%) is water.

=== Climate ===
On the Köppen climate classification scale, Yanceyville is in the Cfa (humid subtropical) zone, which is standard for the state. Its location in the Piedmont region means average winter temperatures ranging from 28.9–52.4 °F (−1.7–11.3 °C), with moderate snowfall, and mild to hot summers.

The county is sometimes included in the well-known "Carolina Alley." This is mostly caused by the cold air from the Appalachian Mountains mixing with the warm Piedmont air. According to USA.com, the county ranks No. 79 in tornado risk out of all 100 counties in North Carolina. It also ranks No. 41 in earthquake risk in the state. From 1950 to 2010, there have been 28 tornadoes rated F2/EF2 or higher; out of all 28, four have had a rating of F3/EF3. From 1950 to 2010, there were a reported 12,795 severe weather related incidents (hail, thunderstorms/heavy winds, and flooding).

Yanceyville is in a relatively low hurricane zone, with thirty-five occurring in the area since 1930. The largest was the 1935 Labor Day hurricane and the most recent was Tropical Storm Ana in 2015. From 1950 to 2010, there have been 13 reported tropical storms/hurricanes that have hit the area. One reason that August and September are among the wettest months is due to the influx of precipitation caused by the yearly hurricane season.

The mildest months of the year for Yanceyville and the region are May, September, and October. There are seven months (April–October) with average high temperatures in the range of 70.5–89.8 °F (21.4–32.1 °C). In 2018, July was the hottest month with an average high temperature of 89.1 °F (31.7 °C). January is usually the coldest month for the town. The most humid months are June, July, and August.

Climate data for Yanceyville 4 SE, North Carolina (1991–2020 normals, extremes 1996–present)
Month	Jan	Feb	Mar	Apr	May	Jun	Jul	Aug	Sep	Oct	Nov	Dec	Year
Record high °F (°C)	78 (26)	80 (27)	86 (30)	93 (34)	95 (35)	104 (40)	102 (39)	103 (39)	96 (36)	92 (33)	83 (28)	78 (26)	104 (40)
Mean daily maximum °F (°C)	48.6 (9.2)	52.4 (11.3)	60.4 (15.8)	70.5 (21.4)	78.1 (25.6)	86.3 (30.2)	89.8 (32.1)	87.0 (30.6)	81.3 (27.4)	70.7 (21.5)	60.9 (16.1)	51.4 (10.8)	69.8 (21.0)
Daily mean °F (°C)	38.8 (3.8)	41.8 (5.4)	49.0 (9.4)	58.6 (14.8)	66.9 (19.4)	75.0 (23.9)	78.9 (26.1)	76.9 (24.9)	70.7 (21.5)	59.5 (15.3)	49.3 (9.6)	41.6 (5.3)	58.9 (14.9)
Mean daily minimum °F (°C)	28.9 (−1.7)	31.2 (−0.4)	37.6 (3.1)	46.8 (8.2)	55.6 (13.1)	63.8 (17.7)	68.1 (20.1)	66.7 (19.3)	60.1 (15.6)	48.3 (9.1)	37.7 (3.2)	31.9 (−0.1)	48.1 (8.9)
Record low °F (°C)	5 (−15)	12 (−11)	12 (−11)	25 (−4)	36 (2)	44 (7)	52 (11)	51 (11)	41 (5)	29 (−2)	18 (−8)	8 (−13)	5 (−15)
Average precipitation inches (mm)	3.67 (93)	3.02 (77)	4.38 (111)	4.31 (109)	4.02 (102)	4.22 (107)	4.21 (107)	4.25 (108)	5.08 (129)	3.57 (91)	3.57 (91)	3.81 (97)	48.11 (1,222)
Average snowfall inches (cm)	4.2 (11)	1.7 (4.3)	1.0 (2.5)	0.0 (0.0)	0.0 (0.0)	0.0 (0.0)	0.0 (0.0)	0.0 (0.0)	0.0 (0.0)	0.0 (0.0)	0.0 (0.0)	1.9 (4.8)	8.8 (22)
Average precipitation days (≥ 0.01 in)	10.5	9.8	10.3	10.8	11.1	11.2	11.3	10.4	9.4	8.3	8.1	10.7	121.9
Average snowy days (≥ 0.1 in)	2.0	1.3	0.4	0.0	0.0	0.0	0.0	0.0	0.0	0.0	0.0	0.6	4.3
Source: NOAA

== Demographics ==
Historical population
Census	Pop.	Note	%±
1910	338		—
1950	1,391		—
1960	1,113		−20.0%
1970	1,274		14.5%
1990	1,973		—
2000	2,091		6.0%
2010	2,039		−2.5%
2020	1,937		−5.0%
2022 (est.)	1,965	▲	1.4%
U.S. Decennial Census; 2020

=== 2020 census ===
Yanceyville racial composition
Race	Number	Percentage
White (non-Hispanic)	720	37.17%
Black or African American (non-Hispanic)	1,035	53.43%
Native American	5	0.26%
Asian	20	1.03%
Pacific Islander	4	0.21%
Other/Mixed	69	3.56%
Hispanic or Latino	84	4.34%

At the 2020 census, there were 1,937 people and an estimated 1,208 households and 690 families residing in the town. In 2020, the estimated median age in Yanceyville was 48.9 years. For every 100 females, there were an estimated 113.6 males.

=== 2010 census ===
Yanceyville racial composition
Race	Number	Percentage
White (non-Hispanic)	779	38.21%
Black or African American (non-Hispanic)	1,102	54.05%
Native American	8	0.39%
Asian	8	0.39%
Pacific Islander	2	0.10%
Other/Mixed	66	3.24%
Hispanic or Latino	74	3.63%

At the 2010 census, there were 2,039 people and an estimated 671 households and 359 families residing in Yanceyville. In 2010, the estimated median age was 41.1 years. For every 100 females, there were an estimated 110.2 males.

=== 2000 census ===
At the 2000 census, there were 2,091 people and an estimated 658 households and 400 families residing in Yanceyville. The population density was 450.9 inhabitants per square mile (174.1/km^{2}). There were 748 housing units at an average density of 161.3 per square mile (62.3/km^{2}). The racial makeup of the town was 53.99% African American, 44.29% White, 1.00% Hispanic or Latino, 0.33% Native American, 0.14% Asian, 0.33% from other races, and 0.91% from two or more races.

Out of the 658 households, 29.3% had children under the age of 18 living with them, 33.0% were married couples living together, 24.3% had a female householder with no husband present, and 39.2% were non-families. 36.8% of all households consisted of individuals living alone and 19.0% had someone living alone who was 65 years of age or older. The average household size was 2.21 and the average family size was 2.88.

The age distribution of the town's population consisted of 19.6% under the age of 18, 8.4% from 18 to 24, 32.9% from 25 to 44, 20.8% from 45 to 64, and 18.3% who were 65 years of age or older.

The median income for a household in Yanceyville was $20,353 and the median income for a family was $26,417. Males had a median income of $24,632 versus $20,398 for females. The per capita income for the town was $16,956. About 23.3% of families and 27.7% of the population were below the poverty line, including 41.7% of those under age 18 and 24.1% of those age 65 and over.

== Economy ==
Prominent industries in Yanceyville include agriculture, manufacturing, education, food service, healthcare, retail, and other service industries. Manufacturers in the town include Chemtek, a manufacturer and distributor of industrial maintenance chemicals. Yanceyville is also home to one industrial park: Yanceyville Business Park.

Three main areas of business are located in Yanceyville: Downtown (the Historic District), West Main Street, and NC 86. The town's central business district (CBD) starts at NC 62 and Main Street, extending west on Main Street for roughly one mile (1.6 km). Its focal point is Court Square, which contains the county's historic courthouse.

Approximately half of the central business district is located within the town's historic district. Businesses in the CBD include banks, law offices, CPAs, a newspaper company, an auction house, hair salons, a coffee shop, restaurants, a bike shop, and a general store. Additionally, the town features CoSquare, a county-supported coworking space that fosters entrepreneurship and remote work.

The Caswell County Local Foods Council initiates community-driven projects and manages the Caswell County Farmers Market in Yanceyville. NC Cooperative Extension's office in the town connects local farmers and agribusinesses with vital research-based information and technology.

Yanceyville and the surrounding county have been described as a prime location for growth in the information technology and manufacturing sectors. The area lies within the Piedmont Triad and is near Danville, Virginia, as well as the Research Triangle, providing access to regional employment centers, services, and institutions.

As of 2023, major employers in and around Yanceyville include Caswell County Schools (the county’s largest employer), the NCDAC’s Caswell Correctional Center and Dan River Prison Work Farm, and Piedmont Community College’s Caswell County Campus.

Yanceyville’s 2022–2036 comprehensive land use plan identifies economic development as a municipal priority. As of August 2025, the town did not require a local privilege license; businesses are required to complete a business information form and obtain zoning approval, which are administered by the town manager’s office.

== Arts, culture, and recreation ==
=== Festivals ===
Yanceyville annually hosts the "Bright Leaf Hoedown," which takes place in the town square. It is a one-day outdoor festival held in late September featuring local food vendors, live entertainment, crafts, and non-profit organizations. The event usually draws more than 5,000 guests.

The Caswell County Historical Association holds its annual Heritage Festival in Yanceyville each May. The festival celebrates town and county history through living history reenactments, tours, games, vendors, and live music.

=== Historic landmarks ===
Yanceyville is home to Caswell County Courthouse, an antebellum courthouse designed by William Percival. The courthouse is listed on the National Register of Historic Places, as are other notable buildings and houses in the area, including:

- Bartlett Yancey House
- Caswell County Training School (later Caswell County High School)
- Graves House
- John Johnston House
- Melrose/Williamson House
- Poteat House
- William Henry and Sarah Holderness House
- Yanceyville Historic District

=== Other cultural attractions ===
Located in Yanceyville, the Caswell County Civic Center has a full-size professionally equipped stage, a 912-seat auditorium, meeting and banquet facilities for up to 500, a lobby art gallery, and accessories for concerts, theatre, and social functions. Events are also held at the Fulton-Walton Fellowship Center and the Yanceyville Town Pavilion.

First Friday is a free monthly concert series at the Yanceyville Town Pavilion, held on the first Fridays from May through October at 7 p.m., featuring regional bands, a showcase of classic vehicles, children’s activities, and food for purchase.

Additional points of interest and amenities include:

- Caswell Council for the Arts
- Caswell County Farmers Market
- Caswell County Veterans Memorial
- Caswell Horticulture Club
- Old Caswell County Jail
- Old Poteat School (Poteat One-Room School)
- Yanceyville Caswell Museum of History
- Town of Yanceyville 9/11 Memorial
- Town of Yanceyville Public Safety Memorial
- Yanceyville's municipal water tower (landmark)
- Yanceyville Museum of Art
- Yoder's Country Market

=== Parks and recreation ===
The Caswell County Department of Parks and Recreation provides indoor and outdoor recreational facilities, as well as sports programs and activities.

Located in Yanceyville, the Caswell Senior Center offers recreation and fitness facilities for senior citizens.

S.R. Farmer Lake, built in 1986 in Yanceyville Township, offers opportunities for fishing, boating, hiking, and relaxation.

Additional recreational areas in Yanceyville include:

- Caswell Community Arboretum
- Caswell Pines Golf Club (in Yanceyville Township)
- Flying Disc Clubhouse's disc golf course
- Maud F. Gatewood Municipal Park
- MBros Park
- Orchard Lake Trail, a 2.9-mile (4.7 km) loop trail suitable for birding, hiking, and mountain biking
- Yanceyville Park/Memorial Park

== Government ==
Yanceyville operates under a council–manager form of government. The town council is composed of four council members and a mayor, all of whom are elected at large by voters. Neither the mayor nor the council members run for office based on party affiliation, and ballots do not include information about their political party membership.

The nonpartisan town council's stated role is to facilitate economic, infrastructure, and community development. Moreover, it determines which services to offer citizens to ensure the community remains socially and fiscally prosperous and healthy.

The town council is also responsible for establishing policies guiding the town's administration, including law enforcement, fire and rescue, and emergency services issues. Additionally, its responsibilities include setting Yanceyville's tax, water, and sewer rates, and appointing a town manager.

The town manager's responsibilities include directing operational activities, supervising personnel, budgeting, planning, zoning, and purchasing. In July 2021, Kamara Barnett was appointed the town manager of Yanceyville.

In August 2025, the town council's members were:

- Kenneth Darnell
- Alvin Foster, Mayor
- Brian Massey
- Darrell McLean, Mayor Pro-Tem
- Keith Tatum

The town council conducts meetings at the Yanceyville Municipal Services Building. Yanceyville's government has offices for economic development, public services, public safety, human resources, finance, utilities, planning, zoning, and general administration.

The Caswell County Board of Commissioners holds its regular meetings at the historic courthouse in Yanceyville.

== Education ==
=== Higher education ===
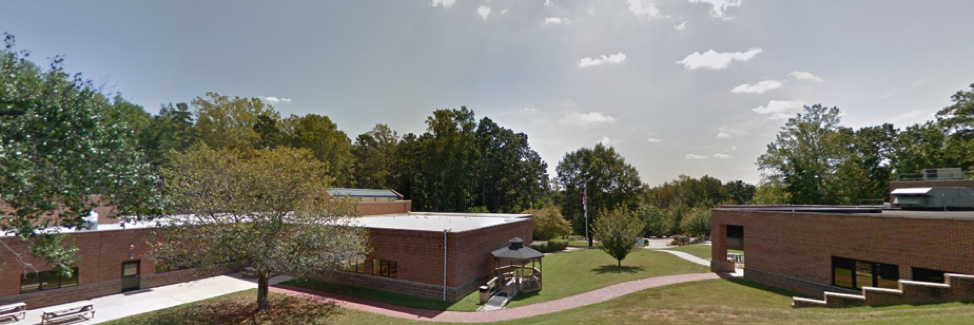
Piedmont Community College, Caswell County Campus

Piedmont Community College has a branch campus in Yanceyville.

=== Primary and secondary education ===
The following public schools are located in Yanceyville:

- Bartlett Yancey High School
- N.L. Dillard Middle School
- Oakwood Elementary School

=== Libraries ===
Gunn Memorial Public Library in Yanceyville offers year-round programs for all age groups. In addition to summer reading initiatives designed to prevent "summer slide," the library hosts regular children's sessions such as "Lambs & Lions" (ages 0-5) and "Book-Baggers" (ages 6-12) from September to May. It also provides programs and a teen room for adolescents (ages 13-18), as well as a variety of adult programs, including computer classes, book discussions, and crafting workshops.

== Healthcare ==
Yanceyville's largest primary care provider is Caswell Family Medical Center, which also offers urgent care, specialty care, and behavioral health services.

Other health care providers in the town include:

- Caswell County Health Department Clinic, offering primary care and public health services
- Caswell House, a senior living facility
- Sovah Family Medicine-Yanceyville, a family medicine practice
- Yanceyville Rehabilitation and Healthcare Center, a skilled nursing and rehabilitation facility

== Media ==
=== Print media ===
- The Caswell Messenger

=== Radio ===
Yanceyville is the town of license for 1540 AM WYNC, a broadcaster of gospel music.

=== Television ===
Yanceyville is part of the Greensboro–High Point–Winston-Salem designated market area, the 46th largest broadcast television market in the United States.

== Infrastructure ==
=== Public safety ===
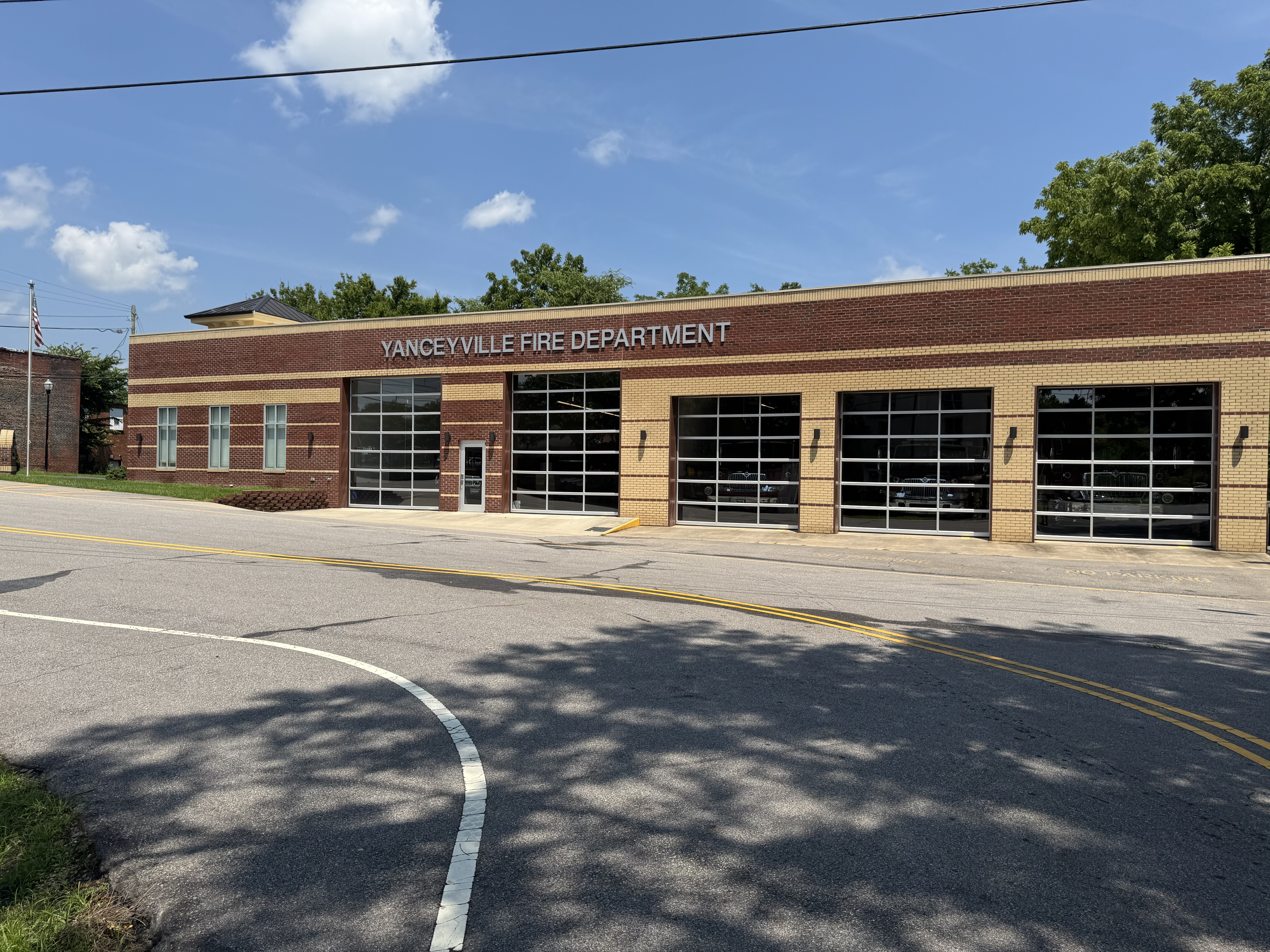
Yanceyville Fire Department

Yanceyville relies on Caswell County agencies for the following public safety services:

- Law Enforcement: Provided by the Caswell County Sheriff's Office
- Emergency Medical Services (EMS): Caswell County Emergency Medical Services (CCEMS) offers medical transport and emergency care before hospitalization.
- Emergency Management: Caswell Emergency Management (CEM) oversees disaster preparedness and response.

Fire Protection: The Yanceyville Fire Department provides fire and rescue services within the town.

==== Correctional facilities ====
- Caswell Correctional Center, a medium-custody facility of the North Carolina Department of Adult Correction
- Dan River Prison Work Farm, a minimum-custody facility of the North Carolina Department of Adult Correction

=== Utilities ===
Yanceyville's electric system is maintained by Duke Energy and Piedmont Electric Cooperative.

S.R. Farmer Lake supplies the town's drinking water. The Yanceyville Water Treatment Plant draws surface water from the lake, treats it, and distributes it to the community.

=== Transportation ===
The town is not directly served by an interstate highway, railway, or river.

==== Major highways ====
- Future I-785 (concurrency with US 29)
- US 29
- US 29 Bus.
- US 158
- NC 49
- NC 57
- NC 62
- NC 86
- NC 87
- NC 119
- NC 150
- NC 700

==== Airport ====
Yanceyville Municipal Airport, FAA code 6W4, serves general aviation (GA) aircraft.

==== Public transit ====
Caswell County Area Transportation System (CATS) offers public transport services to residents of Caswell County.

==== Nearby rail access ====
Danville station is 13.9 miles (22 km) north of Yanceyville, in Danville, Virginia.

== Notable people ==
- The Badgett Sisters, folk and gospel group composed of sisters Celester, Connie, and Cleonia Badgett
- Samuel Bason (1894–1986), member of the North Carolina Senate
- Mic'hael Brooks (born 1991), former NFL player who attended high school in Yanceyville
- Jasper Brown (1918–1997), civil rights activist and farmer
- Wilson Carey (1831–c. 1905), Reconstruction era politician serving in the North Carolina House of Representatives
- N. L. Dillard (1906-1969), educator and principal of Caswell County Training School (later Caswell County High School)
- Max Drake (born 1952), musician
- Donna Edwards (born 1958), former U.S. representative
- Samuel Simeon Fels (1860–1950), businessman and philanthropist
- A. Oveta Fuller (1955–2022), associate professor of microbiology at University of Michigan Medical School
- Maud Gatewood (1934–2004), artist
- Calvin Graves (1804–1877), member of the North Carolina House of Commons and North Carolina Senate
- Henry Lee Graves (1813–1881), president of Baylor University
- John Gunn (1939–2010), race car driver
- John Kerr (1782–1842), member of the U.S. House of Representatives
- John Kerr Jr. (1811–1879), congressional representative and jurist
- John H. Kerr (1873–1958), jurist and politician
- Jacob E. Long (1880–1955), 15th lieutenant governor of North Carolina from 1925 to 1929
- Ida Isabella Poteat (1858–1940), artist and instructor
- William Louis Poteat (1856–1938), president of Wake Forest University and early advocate of Darwinian evolution
- Laurence Stallings (1894–1968), playwright, screenwriter, and novelist
- John W. Stephens (1834–1870), North Carolina state senator, agent for the Freedmen's Bureau
- Vanessa Siddle Walker (born 1958), professor emerita of African American educational studies at Emory University
- Neal Watlington (1922–2019), MLB player for the Philadelphia Athletics
- Hugh Webster (1943–2022), register of deeds for Alamance County and North Carolina state senator
- Benjamin Forrest Williams (1925–2017), artist and art curator
- George “Royal George” Williamson (1788–1856), member of the North Carolina Senate
- Carl Willis (born 1960), former MLB player and current pitching coach for the Cleveland Guardians
- Elijah Benton Withers (1836–1898), member of the North Carolina House of Representatives
- Bartlett Yancey (1785–1828), Democrat-Republican U.S. congressman

== See also ==
- Hyco Lake, a reservoir and recreation area in Caswell and Person counties
- National Register of Historic Places listings in Caswell County, North Carolina
- Research Triangle Park, the largest research park in the United States located 49.7 miles (80.0 km) southeast of Yanceyville
- Virginia International Raceway, a nearby multi-purpose road course offering auto and motorcycle racing

== Works cited ==
- Powell, William S. (1977). When the Past Refused to Die: A History of Caswell County, North Carolina, 1777-1977. Durham, NC: Moore Pub. Co.
