= Melrose/Williamson House =

Historic house in North Carolina, United States

- U.S. National Register of Historic Places
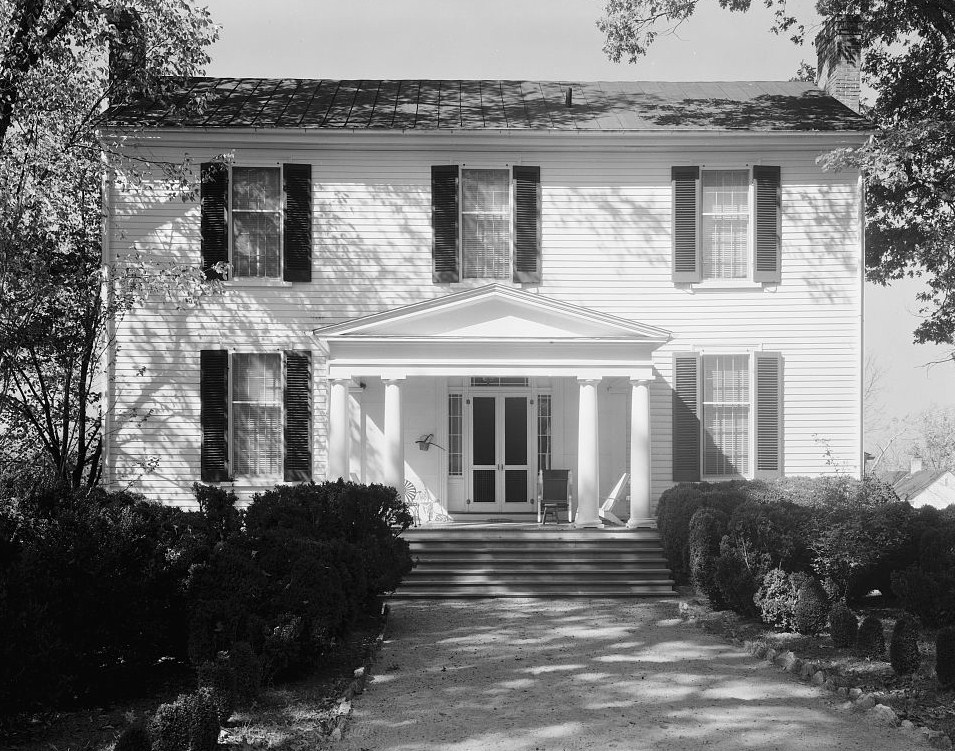
- Melrose, HABS Photo, 1938

- Location within North Carolina Location within the United States
- Nearest city: Off NC 62, near Yanceyville, North Carolina
- Coordinates: 36°25′42″N 79°17′51″W
- Area: 172 acres (70 ha)
- Built: c. 1780, c. 1840
- NRHP reference No.: 85000379
- Added to NRHP: February 28, 1985

Melrose, also known as the Williamson House, is a historic plantation house located near Yanceyville, Caswell County, North Carolina. It consists of two two-story, frame blocks connected by a 1 1/2-story breezeway. The original section dated to about 1780 and is a two-story, frame single pile block with Federal style details. The later section was built about 1840, and is a two-story, frame single pile block with Greek Revival style details. The later section features a portico supported by four unfluted Doric order columns. Also on the property is an octagonal, Williamsburg-style pump house with a conical roof.

It was added to the National Register of Historic Places in 1985.
