= Graves House =

Historic house in North Carolina, United States

- U.S. National Register of Historic Places
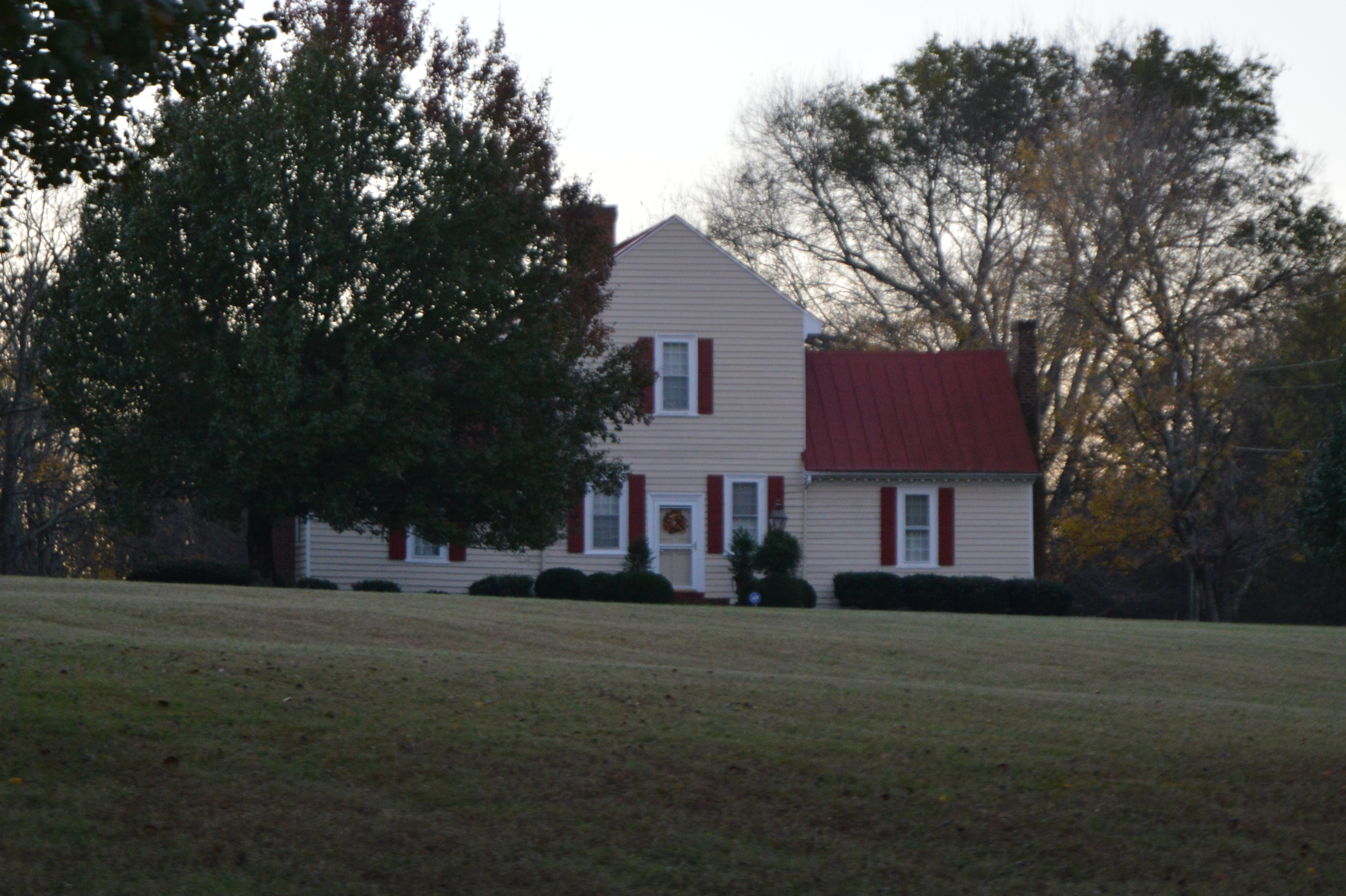
- Roadside view

- Location within North Carolina Location within the United States
- Location: U.S. 158 at NC 86, Yanceyville, North Carolina
- Coordinates: 36°24′15″N 79°19′20″W
- Area: 9 acres (3.6 ha)
- Built: c. 1780
- Architectural style: Georgian
- NRHP reference No.: 74001335
- Added to NRHP: November 20, 1974

Graves House is a historic home located at Yanceyville, Caswell County, North Carolina. It was built about 1780, and is a tripartite Georgian style frame dwelling consisting of a three bay by four bay center section flanked by wings one bay wide and three bays deep.

Recorded by the Historic American Buildings Survey in April 1940, It was added to the National Register of Historic Places in 1974.
