= Kansas City Barbeque =

Restaurant in San Diego, California

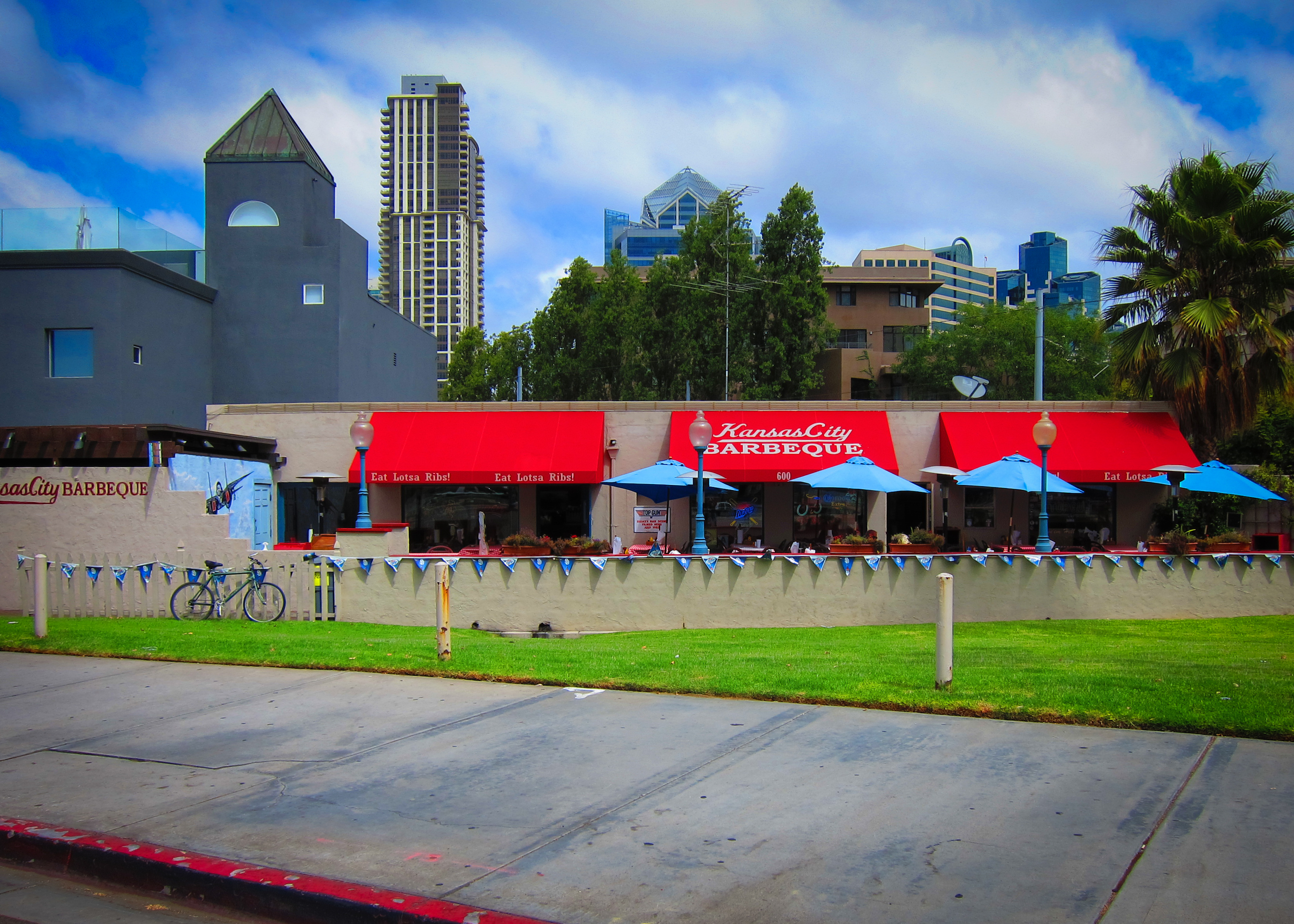
- September 2010
- Interactive map of Kansas City Barbeque

Restaurant information
- Established: 1983
- Location: San Diego, California
- Coordinates: 32°42′41.8″N 117°10′7.2″W
- Website: www.kcbbq.net

Kansas City Barbeque is a restaurant and bar in the Marina district in San Diego, California. Self-proclaimed as the "Top Gun Bar", it is known for being a filming location for scenes used in the film Top Gun.

== Top Gun ==
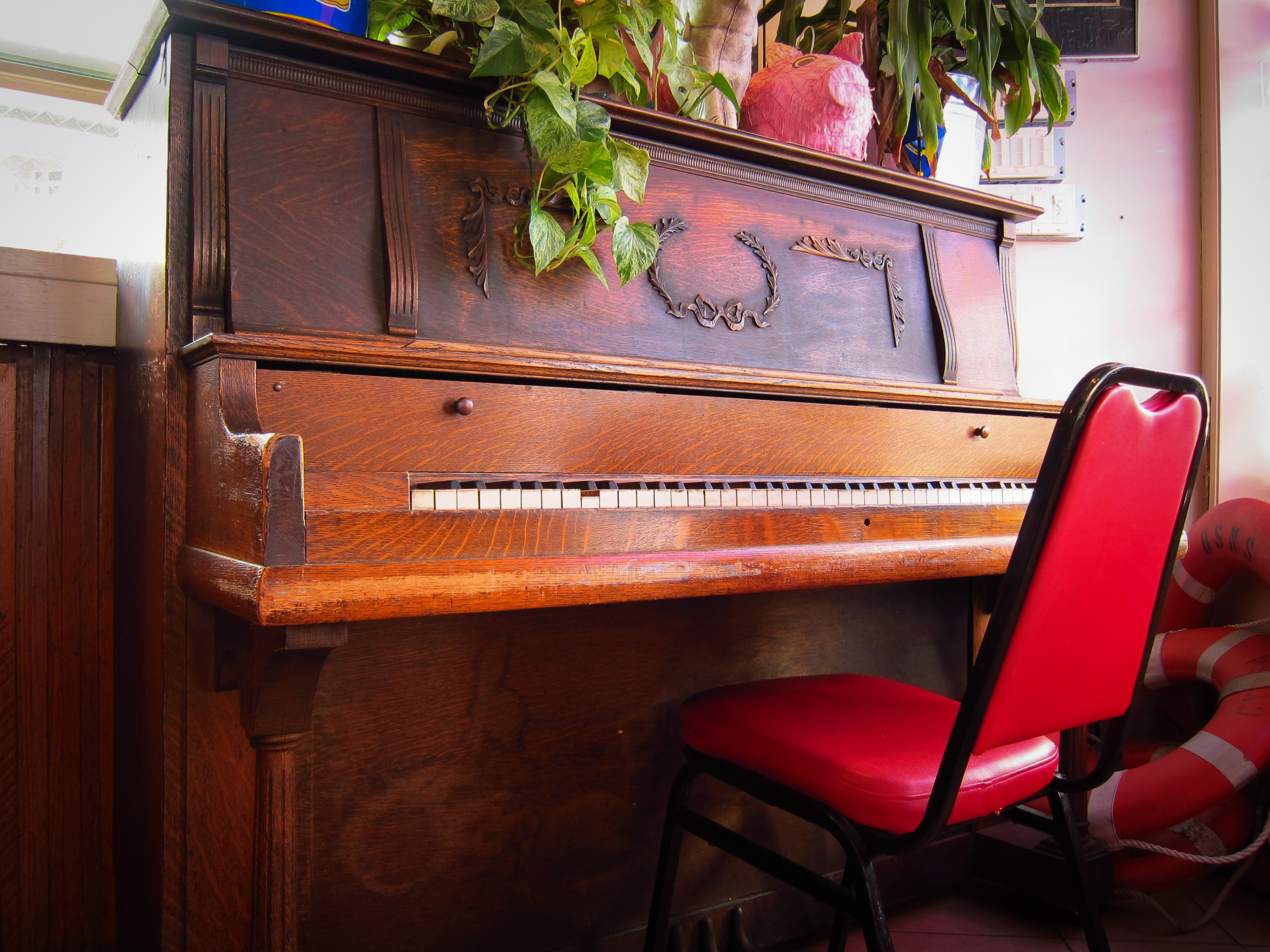
Piano used in Top Gun, one of the few items that survived the 2008 fire

While working in San Diego, the location director for Paramount Pictures visited Kansas City Barbeque for a beer, who liked the atmosphere and brought the bar to the attention of film director Tony Scott. The bar was closed for just one day for filming to take place.

The bar was used in the scene in which Nick "Goose" Bradshaw (Anthony Edwards) and Pete "Maverick" Mitchell (Tom Cruise) sing "Great Balls of Fire" while seated at the piano, as well as the final scene.

== Fire ==
On June 26, 2008, a fire destroyed the entire building. San Diego Fire-Rescue Department spokesman, Maurice Luque, described the building as "gutted". The fire originated in an open cooking pit in the kitchen of the restaurant and eventually spread to the building's interior. No injuries were sustained and an estimated 45 firefighters were able to extinguish the fire in 20 minutes. The damage was estimated at $400,000, excluding memorabilia and props from the film.

Establishment owner and Kansas City native, Martin Blair, began planning the building's restoration the day after the fire. It took two months to clear out the rubble from the restaurant, but the bar reopened in November 2008.
