= The Caswell Messenger =

American weekly newspaper

Caswell Messenger
- Type: Weekly newspaper
- Owner: Womack Publishing Company
- News editor: Debra Ferrell
- Founded: 1926; 100 years ago
- Language: English
- Headquarters: 137 Main St., PO Box 100, Yanceyville, NC 27379
- Sister newspapers: Lake Gaston Gazette-Observer, Mebane Enterprise, News of Orange, Montgomery Herald, The Warren Record
- OCLC number: 13118254
- Website: caswellmessenger.com

The Caswell Messenger is an American weekly newspaper located in Caswell County, North Carolina, published by the Womack Publishing Company. It has been in publication since 1926.

The paper focuses on local news in Caswell County, including the communities of Yanceyville, Leasburg, Milton, Semora, Providence, Blanch, Hightowers, Frogsboro, and Ruffin, among others. It covers local government, sports, and community news, and a March 2023 article identifies Debra Ferrell as its news editor.

== See also ==
- List of newspapers published in North Carolina
