= Senator Graves (disambiguation) =

Dixie Bibb Graves (1882–1965) was a U.S. Senator from Alabama from 1937 to 1938. Senator Graves may also refer to:

- Angelia Williams Graves (fl. 2020s), Virginia State Senate
- Azariah Graves (1768–1850), North Carolina State Senate
- Calvin Graves (1804–1877), North Carolina State Senate
- Charles H. Graves (1839–1928), Minnesota State Senate
- Frank X. Graves Jr. (1923–1990), New Jersey State Senate
- Paul D. Graves (1907–1972), New York State Senate
- Rhoda Fox Graves (1877–1950), New York State Senate
- Ross Graves (1874–1940), New York State Senate
- Sam Graves (born 1963), Missouri State Senate
- William Carey Graves (1895–1966), Texas State Senate
