= Purley, North Carolina =

Unincorporated community in North Carolina, US

Coordinates: 36°28′30″N 79°21′27″W

The W.D. Pleasant General Store

Purley is an unincorporated community in Caswell County, North Carolina, United States, which, along with the communities of Blanch and Providence, makes up Dan River Township.

On a farm in this area, a process for curing brightleaf tobacco was discovered by an enslaved man named Stephen in 1839 and was improved in the 1850s.

Tradition relates that the name "Purley" came from the Samuel Satterwhite Harrison House that sat on a hill and was painted a "pearly white" when such a paint scheme was a novelty. This resulted in much comment, and the area eventually was named "Purley."

Today, Pleasant’s Store remains a notable community landmark, having been operated by the Pleasant family since 1914.

== History ==
Historian William S. Powell provides a vivid description of Purley in When the Past Refused to Die: A History of Caswell County North Carolina 1777–1977 (1977), pages 336–337:

Purley in the north central part of the county is noted as the source of the earliest bright leaf tobacco. The Slade family lived here and it was on their plantation in 1852 that the first bright leaf was cured. A post office at Purley served the community from 1855 until 1920. The community developed along the Yanceyville-Danville plank road when it became a stagecoach stop. Tradition relates that the name evolved because the Samuel Satterwhite Harrison house built before 1846 atop a hill here was painted a gleaming white. From a distance it appeared to be a "pearly white" house. Purley at one time had a doctor; Cobb & Daves operated both a sawmill and a gristmill here in the late nineteenth century; there are several churches in the community; and there has long been a general store to supply most needs. Pleasant's Store has been in operation since 1914 and owner William Pleasant recently commented that he once sold large quantities of flour in 25 and 50-pound bags. The growing sale of milk and eggs, he noted, reflects the demise of the family barnyard and milk cow. Dog food and other items for dogs far outsell flour now.

== Geography ==
Purley is located in the north-central part of Caswell County, just south of the Virginia border. It occupies a fairly level plain that leads down to Moon Creek, which flows into the Dan River. The Purley region is less rugged than some other areas of Caswell County, especially the ridges that are on either side of Country Line Creek.

== Demographics ==
It is a small rural area of Caswell County long dominated by farming activities.
