= Milesville =

Milesville may refer to:

- Milesville, North Carolina, an unincorporated community in Caswell County
- Milesville, South Dakota, an unincorporated community in Haakon County
