= Caswell County, North Carolina =

County in North Carolina, United States

- County
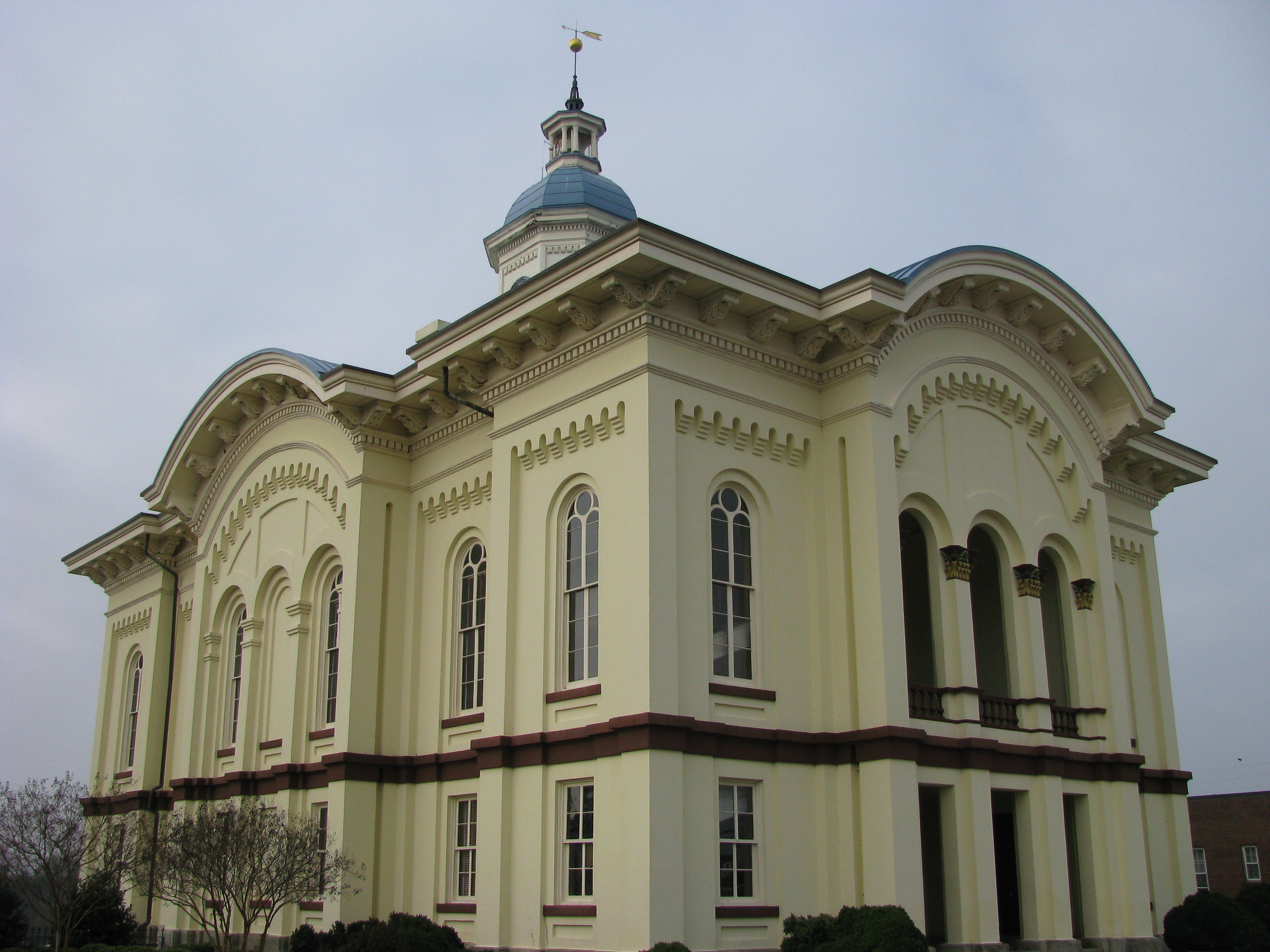
- Old Caswell County Courthouse in Yanceyville

- Seal
- Motto: "Preserving the Past – Embracing the Future"
- Location within the U.S. state of North Carolina
- Interactive map of Caswell County, North Carolina
- Coordinates: 36.39°N 79.34°W
- Country: United States
- State: North Carolina
- Founded: June 1, 1777
- Named for: Richard Caswell
- Seat: Yanceyville
- Largest community: Yanceyville

Area
  - Total: 428.71 sq mi (1,110.4 km^{2})
  - Land: 425.37 sq mi (1,101.7 km^{2})
  - Water: 3.34 sq mi (8.7 km^{2}) 0.78%

Population (2020)
  - Total: 22,736
  - Estimate (2025): 22,563 ▼
  - Density: 53.45/sq mi (20.64/km^{2})
- Time zone: UTC−5 (Eastern)
  - Summer (DST): UTC−4 (EDT)
- Congressional district: 13th
- Website: www.caswellcountync.gov

Caswell County is a county in the U.S. state of North Carolina. It is located in the Piedmont Triad region, bordering Virginia. At the 2020 census, the population was 22,736. Its county seat is Yanceyville.

The towns of Yanceyville and Milton are the only two incorporated communities in Caswell County. Unincorporated communities in the county include Blanch, Casville, Cherry Grove, Leasburg, Pelham, Prospect Hill, Providence, and Semora.

The Dan River and Hyco Lake are notable geographic features, with Hyco Lake serving as a popular recreation area.

The area that is now Caswell County has at least 12,000 years of human history, beginning with Indigenous habitation. Colonial-era settlement began in the mid-18th century, and the county became a hub for bright leaf tobacco farming in the 19th century, shaping the local economy, which relied heavily on enslaved labor before the Civil War.

The county was established in 1777 from the northern portion of Orange County during the American Revolutionary War and was named for Richard Caswell, the first governor of North Carolina. Early settlers were Scotch-Irish, German, French Huguenot, and English migrants seeking fertile land.

Caswell County has played a role in significant national events, including the American Revolution, Reconstruction, and the civil rights movement. Today, the county is known for its historic landmarks, cultural tourism, and an economy that is diversifying beyond its traditional agricultural base.

== History ==
=== Early history, settlement, and growth ===
The area that is now Caswell County has evidence of Native American presence dating back at least 12,000 years. Indigenous peoples of the region included tribes such as the Occaneechi, Shakori, and Eno.

Abundant evidence of Indigenous activity, including pottery fragments, arrowheads, and stone tools, has been discovered across Caswell County, reflecting its long history of Native American habitation and settlement.

In 1663, Charles II of England granted the land of Carolina (named for his father, Charles I) to eight noblemen, known as the Lords Proprietors. A second charter in 1665 expanded the colony's boundaries and reaffirmed their proprietorship. In 1744, land including present-day Caswell County became part of the Granville District, when John Carteret, 2nd Earl Granville retained rights to the northern half of North Carolina.

Formed in 1777, Caswell County had previously been part of the northern region of Orange County, which was established in 1752. Colonial records show that land grants in the area now comprising Caswell County were issued as early as 1748. There were Scotch-Irish, German, and English settlements along the Dan River and Hogans and Country Line creeks by 1751.

The first recorded settlements occurred between 1750 and 1755, when eight to ten families migrated from within Orange County, as well as from Culpeper and Spotsylvania counties in Virginia. (Note: George Washington was Culpeper County's surveyor from 1749 to 1750.) The primary reason for resettlement was economic. They were searching for fertile land, which the lowlands of the Dan River and several creeks provided.

The area grew rapidly after the initial settlements. Scotch-Irish and German families traversed the Great Wagon Road, which was the main route for settlement in the region, and had come by way of Virginia and Pennsylvania. English and French Huguenot migrants came from settled areas of eastern North Carolina, following the Great Trading Path. English colonists also came from Virginia, using the same network of roads and trails.

The area's culture was strongly influenced by Scotch-Irish and English traditions, shaping its social, spiritual, educational, and economic life. Local commerce centered on stores, mills, and tanneries, as well as home and shop trades such as blacksmithing, carpentry, coopering, pottery, wagon making, rope making, brewing and distilling, weaving, hat making, and tailoring.

Enslaved Africans were brought to the area by migrating enslavers beginning in the 1750s, as well as by slave traders, primarily through the domestic slave trade from within North Carolina, South Carolina, Georgia, and the Chesapeake region.

Slavery in the region was facilitated by:

- Debt-based transactions, in which enslaved people of African descent were pledged as collateral for loans or debts, a common practice among landowners seeking to expand their farms or acquire supplies.
- Slave auction blocks, where traffickers sold enslaved people, often moving large groups through the region.
- The doctrine of partus sequitur ventrem, wherein children born to enslaved mothers were automatically enslaved under colonial laws.

Legal frameworks to reinforce slavery in North Carolina were established before the area was extensively settled and continued to evolve as the region developed. For example, the 1741 slave codes restricted manumission, barred enslaved Black people from owning livestock or carrying guns, and permitted, without legal consequences, the killing of freedom seekers formally declared outlaws by public proclamation.

In August 1774, the colony’s First Provincial Congress resolved that after November 1, 1774, no enslaved people would be imported into North Carolina “from any part of the world,” whether from overseas or from other British colonies, and that residents could not buy people newly brought into the colony. This measure targeted international and intercolonial importation and did not end the buying and selling of enslaved people already in North Carolina. From 1774 to 1776, county and town Committees of Safety in North Carolina enforced these nonimportation rules. The Revolutionary War further disrupted both the transatlantic slave trade and the coastal and regional slave trade into North Carolina.

In 1786, North Carolina again tried to limit the inflow of enslaved people from outside its borders by banning importation—whether from foreign ports or from other American states—and by imposing a punitive duty on such imports, a measure repealed in 1790; afterward, the state's enslaved population rose from 100,571 (1790) to 133,296 (1800).

By 1794–1795, state laws again forbade bringing enslaved people and indentured servants into North Carolina by land or by water and specifically barred enslaved people arriving from the West Indies, to protect the in‑state slave market and, in lawmakers’ view, to prevent Caribbean slave rebellions from spreading.

Taken together, these provincial and later state measures regulated international and interstate importation; however, they did not prevent the continued buying, selling, or forced movement of enslaved people within North Carolina, and slavery as an institution continued to expand.

Within this broader legal and economic context, the enslaved population in Caswell County grew as agriculture expanded. The late‑18th‑century rise of tobacco cultivation in the Piedmont and in counties bordering Virginia in particular increased demand for enslaved labor and contributed to the county’s rising enslaved population.

Enslaved labor in the area was typically concentrated on farms, with large plantations less common. Over half of enslavers enslaved fewer than five individuals, and only a small minority lived on farms with over 50 others. This smaller-scale system meant Black inhabitants performed diverse tasks and often interacted with those on neighboring farms, fostering social connections and marriages across properties.

Enslaved Black people in the region were primarily forced to do agricultural work, with some working as domestic laborers and a smaller number performing skilled labor. The local economy thrived due to their labor as tobacco production grew; however, the brutal and oppressive conditions that enslaved inhabitants faced led many to use escape, violent resistance, or theft of food and goods to survive.

Despite these conditions, including the enforcement of local slave patrols and public corporal punishment, Black inhabitants maintained resilience through cultural practices, family and community bonds, and subtle acts of resistance such as work slowdowns. These cultural and social networks provided emotional support and a shared sense of identity.

By 1800, nearly one-third (32%) of Caswell County's population was enslaved.

The earliest white settlers in the mid-18th century were primarily yeoman farmers and planters. Later in the century, they were joined by middle-class settlers—historically referred to as the "new families."

Yeoman farmers accounted for more than half of the settler population. Few if any were enslavers at this time. The yeomanry owned small family farms and lived in log homes. They farmed for subsistence, with surpluses going toward debt settlement or bartering for goods. Relying on the skilled and unskilled labor of family members, neighbors, and others, they supported the local agricultural economy by linking farms to early grist mills and sawmills.

Yeoman farmers' economic independence reflected the region's social structure, which provided opportunities for advancement to settlers. For example, North Carolina's lack of a rigid class system enabled migrants to attain prominent government roles more easily. This particularly attracted middle-class settlers mainly from Virginia to the area, some of whom later became sheriffs, justices, militia officers, and state legislators.

Middle-class families, representing a smaller proportion of the settler population, played an important role in the area's early economic and social development. Families including the Coles, Holts, Stephens, and Upchurches were among the "new families" that contributed much to local prosperity by fostering business, trade, and settlement in and around Leasburg, Milton, and (later) Yanceyville.

Due to the influx of the middle class, entrepreneurship and craftsmanship became prevalent in the area, with many settlers engaging in local trades and artisanal production. The new settlers relied on family labor and other workers, also on their small farms, but many later adopted enslaved labor as their prosperity grew.

The planter class, or gentry, represented the upper class and comprised the smallest segment of the white settler population. Most came from prosperous families, owned extensive landholdings, and were influenced by Enlightenment ideas. Through land ownership, agriculture, enslaved labor, and other means, they accumulated wealth and wielded influence that shaped the region's economic, political, and cultural landscape.

The Graves family, who migrated to the area from Virginia in the mid-1750s, exemplified this gentry class. John Graves (1715–1792), a prominent landowner and patriarch of the family, acquired extensive tracts of land along Country Line Creek and established a mill and plantation. His son Azariah Graves (1768–1850), along with other descendants, rose to prominence as planters, merchants, legislators, and community leaders, embodying the gentry's lasting influence.

The Graves family also contributed to religion and education in the region. Azariah's brother, Rev. Barzillai Graves (1759–1827), pastored two local Baptist churches, reflecting his active role in the area's religious community. Azariah supported missionary efforts and is said to have hosted a school for young women on his plantation, where, by 1820, 56 people were enslaved according to census records.

While the Graves family embodied the height of gentry privilege and influence, the area's smaller-scale, less prominent planters had fewer landholdings and lived more modestly. Often referred to as "middling planters," they occupied a position between the gentry and moderately prosperous families. These planters typically engaged in land speculation and trade. They established small mills, bred and sold livestock, and cultivated profitable crops such as wheat, corn, oats, and tobacco on their farms, relying on enslaved labor.

In the early 1780s, a number of children in the area, including those of mixed Black and white ancestry, were bound out as apprentices under fixed-term court-approved contracts with tradesmen or farmers. These apprentices were typically assigned to agricultural labor or skilled trades. However, as enslaved labor became increasingly available, reliance on bound apprentices declined.

Early agricultural production in the area was centered on corn, wheat, oats, and tobacco. Additional crops included sweet potatoes, rye, flax, peas, beans, hay, and cotton. Cattle, hogs, and sheep were also raised, and much wool was shorn. Most household necessities, including wool and cotton for clothing, were produced on farms, ensuring self-sufficiency.

Over time, tobacco became increasingly significant in the region's agricultural economy, with its extensive cultivation beginning around 1793. Until the early 1800s, it was grown as a secondary crop, with corn, wheat, and oats as the principal crops.

Changing market demand, pricing, soil exhaustion, and other factors, such as the availability of enslaved labor, access to trade routes, and relationships with British merchants had impacted the earlier regional trade in tobacco.

Between the early 1760s and early 1770s, many regional planters took credit loans from British-owned mercantile companies in the province to expand agricultural production. The loans funded land purchases and enslaved labor, while British merchants managed tobacco and other exports sent to Virginia warehouses and supplied imported goods.

Initially, these companies offered favorable terms to planters, but over time, declining prices and high debts forced many to sell land or enslaved people to remain solvent. Due to the Revolutionary War, most existing debts were never repaid. After the war, demand for tobacco rose significantly in the 1790s, as planters gained direct access to new international markets, bypassing British middlemen.

During the mid-18th century, the area later known as Caswell County was commonly referred to as the "backcountry" due to its remote location. As the region grew, it became home to mostly small to medium-sized farms, where settlers were notably progressive about building sustainable communities.

Among the first settlers of what is now Caswell County, the Delone family migrated to the area in the early 1750s, while the Graves and Lea families, who intermarried, arrived between 1753 and 1755; together, these families played significant roles in community development. For example, in the late 1780s, Nicholas Delone and William Lea partnered to sell 100 acres, divided into 62 lots, to establish the area's first incorporated town, Leasburg. The town was named for William Lea—a prominent merchant and civic leader.

Lea family members, namely John Lea, also contributed to early community development by initiating, around 1750, construction of the area's first chapel (later known as Lea's Chapel), near South Hyco Creek in what was then Granville County. Another William Lea, known as Capt. William Lea, was named "overseer of the road," responsible for keeping the chapel's road in good repair.

Older families such as the Leas were notable for fostering progressive community development through churches, schools, and businesses, while simultaneously opposing government spending and debt increases, particularly for post-Revolutionary War internal improvements.

Before the Revolutionary War, as local communities grew, they were affected by broader regional events. For example, between 1754 and 1771, the region was affected first by the French and Indian War and later by the Regulator Movement—an uprising against the colonial government in Hillsborough and surrounding counties. During that time, John Lea, serving as sheriff of Orange County, was attacked by five men while attempting to serve a paper on a Regulator—a protester in the colonial uprising; he was tied to a tree and flogged.

The Regulator Movement heightened tensions among settlers and between protesters and the colonial government, although it was not directly about independence; many Regulators remained loyal to the British Crown. The movement reflected the frustrations of those backcountry settlers who were angered by perceived government corruption, unfair taxation, and other mistreatments, culminating in the Battle of Alamance in 1771.

While not explicitly revolutionary, the uprising's stance on corruption and taxation echoed themes of the emerging revolutionary movement, which sought independence from the Crown. In backcountry communities across the region, the American Revolution would find much support.

==== Education and religion ====
Formal education in the area was limited before the Revolutionary War. Between 1750 and 1775, an estimated one-third of white inhabitants could read, and fewer could write. By the period of 1775-1800, around half of the white population received a basic English education, which included reading, writing, and arithmetic.

From 1800 onward, significant progress was made in education, with Robert H. Childers—a local educator and skilled penman—making notable contributions. It is estimated that at least half of the county’s white youth who developed good writing skills were taught directly or indirectly by him.

Building on this momentum, plantation owners and citizens of (later) Yanceyville and Leasburg, seeking to promote the intellectual development of their youth, publicly proposed plans for the establishment of private academies in the winter of 1801. Due to these efforts, academies and female seminaries were founded in the area and expanded over time. Notable institutions included:

- Caswell Academy (est. 1802): offered courses in literature, morality, and religion, with a focus on preparing students for the University of North Carolina.
- Hico Academy (est. 1804): provided English education, Latin, Greek, and mathematics, with a focus on preparing students for university entrance.
- Springfield Academy (est. 1818): offered various subjects under the direction of William C. Love.

Female seminaries:

- Miss Prendergast's School (est. 1818): offered courses in orthography, reading, writing, arithmetic, and needlework.
- Milton Female Academy (est. 1819): emphasized proper conduct, religious exercises, and academic subjects.
- Somerville Female Institute (est. 1848 in Leasburg; Solomon Lea, founder): offered a comprehensive education, including sciences, literature, and arts, with a focus on preparing young women for higher education.

Academies and seminaries such as these were instrumental in shaping the region's educational landscape.

Formal education for the enslaved population, however, remained largely inaccessible, with anti-literacy laws enacted in 1818 and 1830 forbidding their instruction.

Before the anti-literacy laws, groups like the Moravians and Quakers provided basic literacy lessons to enslaved people and free Black residents in North Carolina, although such instruction was not widespread. According to oral tradition, they continued this work, though its extent in the area remains unclear. Free public schools, first established in 1840 in neighboring Rockingham County, excluded African Americans. In rare instances, free Black youth could attend private schools.

The first Black schools in Caswell County were established following Reconstruction, with thirty-seven documented by 1896. In addition, Black churches often served as educational venues.

In 1897, a number of African American residents in Yanceyville chartered a school. Despite these efforts, Black schools remained segregated, underfunded, and faced significant disparities.

Religion played a central role in early settler and Black communities. While the early inhabitants brought their religious beliefs from their places of origin, the typical settler affiliation before the Revolution was with the Church of England.

Before the area was settled in the 1750s, the First Great Awakening drew more free and enslaved Black people in the colony to Protestantism. In the 18th century, many enslaved people practiced African religions, which they often later blended with Christianity through syncretism. By the early 19th century, during the Second Great Awakening, many in the region had converted to Baptist and Methodist denominations while preserving African traditions.

Black converts attended white churches but were segregated into balconies or designated pews. Fears of slave revolts prevented the establishment of independent Black churches until after the Civil War.

Lea's Chapel, established around 1750 as previously mentioned, functioned as a privately controlled "plantation chapel," serving local parishioners with services led by rectors and visiting preachers from various denominations. In 1779, the State of North Carolina granted the chapel and surrounding land to Capt. William Lea, a prominent citizen and landowner. His descendants later donated the property to the Methodist Episcopal Church in 1833.

Other notable churches in the region included Red House Presbyterian Church, founded by Pennsylvania missionary Hugh McAden between 1755 and 1756, and Country Line Primitive Baptist Church, established in 1772.

These and other early churches served as centers for worship and community life, shaping the area's religious and social development.

==== County formation, Revolutionary War, and early governance ====
Caswell County was formed from the northern half of Orange County and officially established on June 1, 1777, during the Revolutionary War. It was created so that governance could be more localized and efficient. The legislative act establishing the county ordered its first court to be held at the homestead of Thomas Douglas and appointed commissioners to find a permanent location to build a county courthouse and prison.

Caswell County was named for Richard Caswell, the first governor of North Carolina. He was also a delegate at the First and Second Continental Congresses and a senior officer of militia in the Southern theater of the Revolutionary War.

During the prelude to the Battle of Guilford Courthouse in 1781, British general Lord Cornwallis pursued General Nathanael Greene through Caswell County. Greene's retreat, called the "Race to the Dan," was a calculated ploy. His objective was to extend Cornwallis far beyond his supply base in Camden, South Carolina, so that his fighting power would be significantly diminished.

Cornwallis and his troops marched through Camp Springs and Leasburg. They continued on to the Red House Church area of Semora in search of Presbyterian minister Hugh McAden, an ardent supporter of the Patriot cause. However, McAden had died a week earlier, foiling their plan to confront him.

At the church, Cornwallis and his men burned many of McAden's papers and records, setting fire to a portion of the building. They are also said to have disturbed McAden's nearby grave.

After the Battle of Guilford Courthouse, Cornwallis, on his way to Yorktown, Virginia, traveled again through northern Caswell County. It is unknown how many locally enslaved people fled to the British for safe haven before the Battle of Yorktown in 1781.

By the war's end in 1783, Caswell County had made significant contributions of personnel and materiel to the war effort. Little fighting occurred locally other than several skirmishes with Tories, resulting in some being killed. County residents renowned for their Revolutionary War service include Lieutenant Colonel Henry "Hal" Dixon, John Herndon Graves, Dr. Lancelot Johnston, and Starling Gunn.

Following the war, the county experienced notable social changes. A small number of free Black families settled in the area. Most of the men had served in the Continental Army or Navy. Usually skilled in a trade, they farmed in a manner similar to yeoman farmers but did not have equal rights. They encountered barriers such as limited access to fertile land, fewer legal protections, and social discrimination.

As the county continued to develop, its infrastructure needs became more pressing. By the mid-1780s, no county courthouse had been built, prompting the General Assembly to pass another act authorizing the construction of public buildings. As a result, a courthouse was established at Leasburg, which was incorporated in 1788 as the county's first official seat of government.

Caswell County's significant population growth had necessitated advancements in governance and infrastructure. A special state census in 1786 ranked it as the second-largest county with a population of 9,839—trailing only Halifax County, which had 489 more inhabitants.

During his 1791 Southern tour to promote unity and address regional concerns, George Washington stayed at Revolutionary War veteran Dudley Gatewood's home in Caswell County from June 3-4. In his journal, Washington noted observations of the land and his efforts to gather insights from locals.

In February 1792, the eastern half of the county was legally separated to form Person County. Following this division, Caswell County's seat of government was relocated from Leasburg to a more central location. The community hosting the new county seat was originally called Caswell Court House. In 1833, the name was changed to Yanceyville.

=== Economic history (1800–2020s) ===
==== Antebellum economy ====
In the early 1800s, Caswell County's wealthy landowners were moving away from diversified farming and accelerating toward tobacco as a single cash crop. This agricultural conversion had a significant impact on the enslaved population, which grew by 54 percent from 1800 to 1810.

In 1810, the village of Caswell Court House (later Yanceyville) had one store and a hattery, two taverns, and approximately fifteen homes. Not long thereafter, silversmiths, blacksmiths, wheelwrights, coachmakers, and other tradesmen began opening businesses. Attorneys, doctors, preachers, and politicians were also drawn to the growing village and county seat.

Around 1830, Caswell County entered a period of economic expansion known as the Boom Era, which lasted until the outbreak of the American Civil War in 1861. Bright leaf tobacco emerged as the county's dominant cash crop, but the era also saw industrialization flourish, with the rise of flour and lumber mills, a cotton factory, a foundry, and a silk company.

Additionally, one of the era's most notable achievements was the renowned furniture craftsmanship of Thomas Day, a free Black businessman in Milton. Day's creations are now celebrated as a major contribution to American decorative arts.

Furthermore, in Yanceyville roads were improved and formally named by 1841. By 1852, the town had grown prosperous enough to charter the Bank of Yanceyville, which boasted one of the highest market capitalizations in the state.

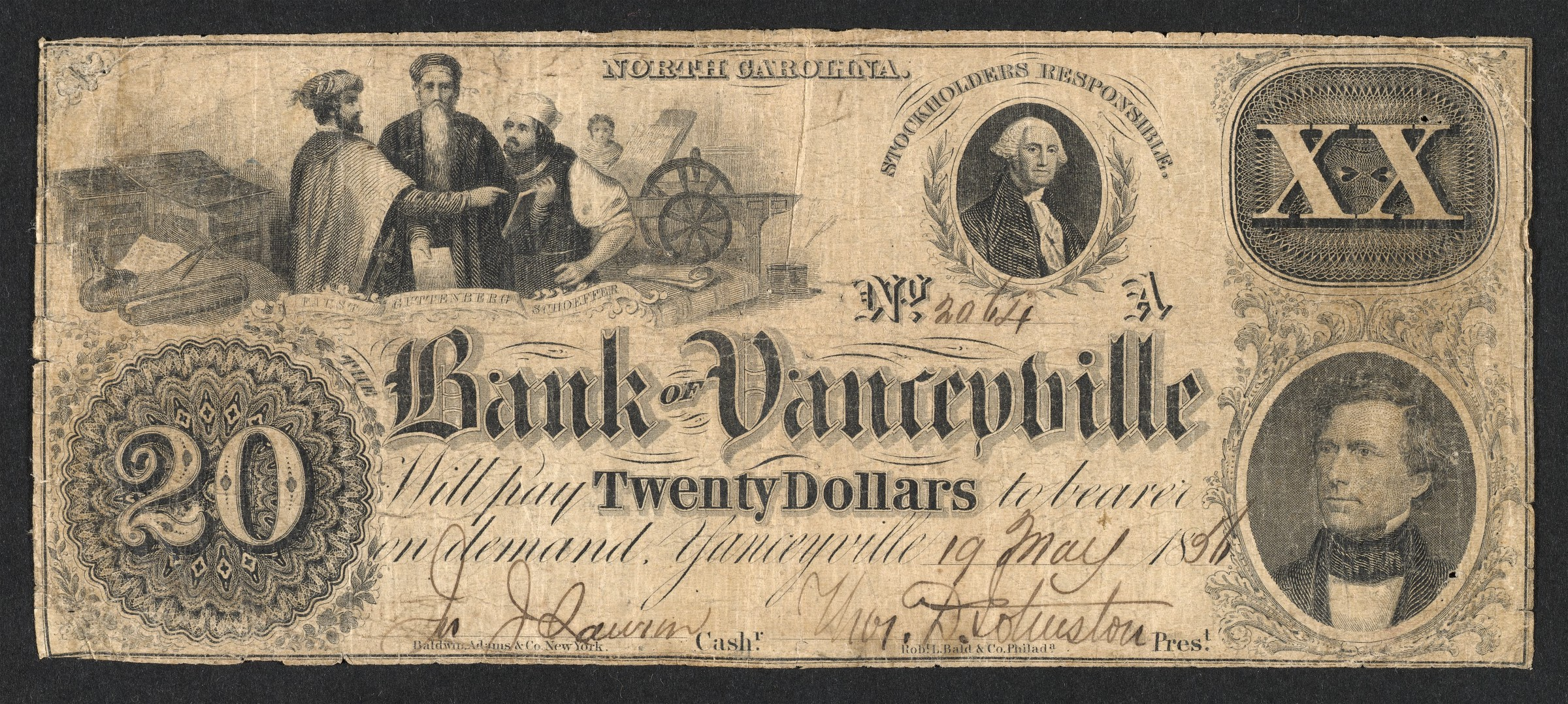
Bank of Yanceyville 20-dollar banknote from 1856

In 1839, on Abisha Slade's farm in Purley, an enslaved man named Stephen discovered the bright leaf tobacco flue-curing process. Slade perfected the curing method in 1856. The following year, his farm harvested 20,000 pounds (9,100 kg) of bright leaf tobacco on 100 acres of land, and the crop was sold at an exorbitant price in Lynchburg, Virginia.

Slade taught the flue-curing technique to many farmers in the area and elsewhere, helping to spread its adoption. Bright leaf tobacco became popular with smokers and North Carolina growers gained a dominant position in the tobacco industry as a result.

The skyrocketing tobacco economy enriched many local residents. The lifestyle of many yeoman farmers shifted to that of planters. Many of the newly wealthy built Greek Revival-style homes and sent their children to private academies. However, the majority of Caswell County's inhabitants did not benefit. By 1850, enslaved African Americans accounted for 52 percent of the county's population.

By 1856, tobacco overshadowed all other forms of enterprise in Caswell County. Tobacco warehouses and manufacturing & processing plants dotted the skyline, with the largest centers located in Yanceyville and Milton. During this time, Leasburg functioned as a regional center of education and included numerous mills and tobacco factories. The community also featured a racetrack, taverns, a tannery, a tailor, a carriage maker, cotton gins, and a brickyard, with commerce largely supported by the surrounding region's tobacco-based economy.

Demand for labor kept growing as Caswell County's tobacco-based economy expanded. The number of enslaved people in the county grew to 9,355 in 1860, from a total of 4,299 in 1810 and 2,788 in 1800.

There were 26 free Black inhabitants residing in Caswell County in 1800, 90 in 1810, and 282 in 1860. The white population declined from a peak of 8,399 in 1850 to 6,578 in 1860. This was due to the western migration of small-scale farmers who were unable to compete with the larger tobacco planters.

In 1858, construction began on Caswell County Courthouse. Built with enslaved labor, the courthouse was completed in 1861 around the start of the Civil War, which brought an end to the prosperous Boom Era.

==== Post–Civil War to 1940s ====
After the Civil War, the collapse of the plantation economy severely disrupted agriculture in Caswell County. While there was a short-lived surge in tobacco output driven by tenant labor and reliance on extended family networks, the loss of enslaved labor left many farms insufficiently maintained and unable to sustain prewar production levels.

In the years that followed, the county's economy remained heavily dependent on tobacco, with limited agricultural diversification and land degradation the norm. Grain production declined and cotton cultivation ceased entirely. The area saw little industrial growth in the late 19th century, with development largely restricted to tobacco factories and minimal railway infrastructure. In Leasburg, the rise of nearby Durham's tobacco industry later doomed its tobacco factories due to competition, causing many residents to relocate for better opportunities.

Industrial growth in Durham and Danville also drew tobacco factories and trade away from Milton and Yanceyville; consolidation in the tobacco industry left local growers dependent on outside markets, and brief railroad, textile, hosiery, and furniture ventures failed in the county under conditions of limited capital, weak transport links, and better-resourced neighbors.

Amid the weakened economy, the county's population declined between 1880 and 1900, showing signs of recovery only after 1910. By that time, the introduction of telephone infrastructure in Yanceyville and Semora signaled a bright spot in local conditions.

However, the area still faced persistent agricultural challenges, including:

- Inadequate farming practices, such as shallow plowing and poor rotation
- Limited crop diversity due to heavy reliance on tobacco
- Underdeveloped livestock production

These issues weakened economic stability by reducing agricultural productivity and degrading soil health, negatively affecting the county's economic progress through the 1910s.

Despite these challenges, Caswell County's residents demonstrated resilience and community spirit during World War I. Local efforts included Red Cross work, military registration, and resource management to support soldiers and civilians, with women playing a prominent role.

Through the 1920s, Caswell County's population continued to grow. To provide better public facilities, the Caswell County Board of Education initiated school improvement projects. These efforts included replacing older, inadequate facilities with new buildings for both African American and white students. For Black students, this included six school construction projects, such as upgrades to Yanceyville School in 1924, funded by public and private contributions with significant support from the Rosenwald Fund.

In 1926, the area experienced several notable developments, including the construction of a county home for the poor as well as the founding of The Caswell Messenger newspaper and the Caswell County Chamber of Commerce.

During the Great Depression, however, many farmers and local businesses struggled with economic hardship, falling crop prices, and limited access to credit. To assist the community, the North Carolina Emergency Relief Administration (NCERA), a state New Deal program, funded projects in Caswell County from 1932 to 1935 to create jobs and improve infrastructure. These included constructing a civic center, renovating the courthouse, building a water treatment plant, and improving schools.

To further assist the community, the Yanceyville Rotary Club was founded in 1937, and its members successfully pioneered economic and community development projects. The county's economy also benefited from the establishment of the Caswell Knitting Mill in 1939.

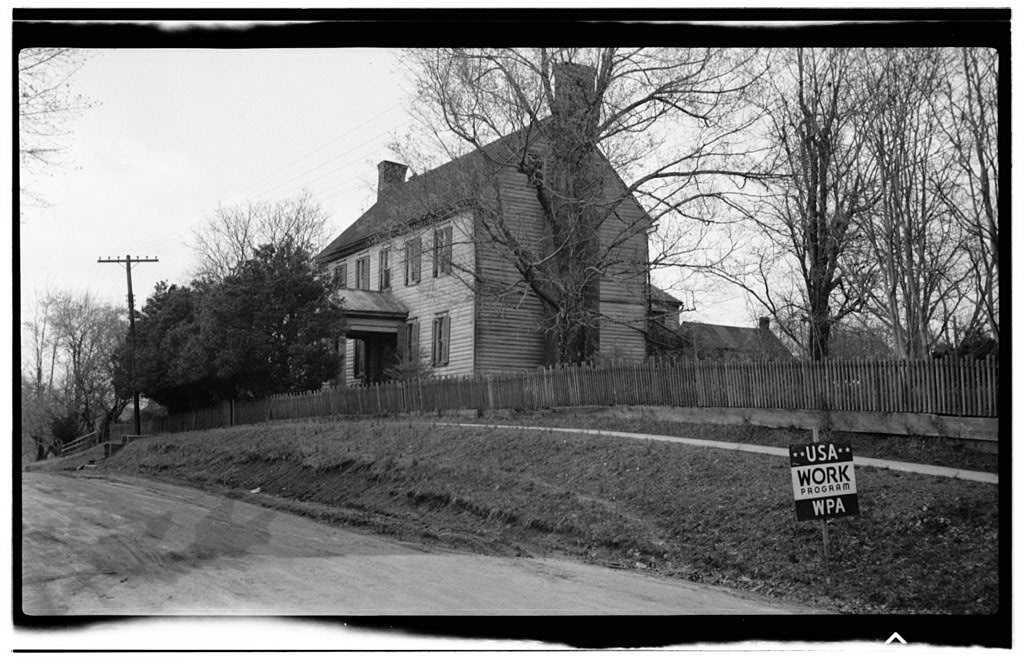
Irwin House, Milton — WPA road construction, 1940

Additionally, the WPA’s rural road development initiatives, advancements in farming practices starting in the 1940s, and the economic impact of World War II had positive effects on the area.

==== Mid-20th century to 2020s ====
In the decades after World War II, local planning materials emphasized that Caswell County's sustained economic advancement depended on developing and maintaining sufficient water resources for industrial expansion, improving roads and other infrastructure, providing new and diverse countywide services, increasing cultural resources, and operating local government in a more businesslike manner.

By 1950, the county's population had grown to 20,870, a figure not surpassed until the 2000 census. The economic upswing of the 1950s brought new businesses to the area, including the opening of a meatpacking operation in 1956 in the county's southwest corner.

In 1965, the General Assembly authorized the Person–Caswell Lake Authority for recreational governance at a new reservoir on the Hyco River. Carolina Power & Light subsequently completed Hyco Lake as the cooling reservoir for a nearby generating station, which began operation in 1966.

From the mid-1950s to the mid-1980s, several textile mills opened in Yanceyville. Royal Textile Mills, for example, restarted operations in 1975 and later supplied major customers, including the U.S. military. This growth broadened the local tax base and increased public revenue.

In 1975, Yanceyville-born painter Maud Gatewood returned to Caswell County and, a year later, became the county's first woman elected commissioner. During her tenure, she advocated for economic development, land-use planning, and expanded human services.

In 1986, S.R. Farmer Lake, a 365-acre water supply reservoir with a public recreation area, was completed for Yanceyville. Under an agreement with Caswell County, the town draws drinking water from the lake, which the Yanceyville Water Treatment Plant treats and distributes.

In 1988, Piedmont Community College opened a branch campus in Yanceyville. The campus serves adult learners and high school students enrolled in the Career and College Promise program and, given its proximity to Bartlett Yancey High School, provides accessible vocational and academic pathways during secondary education.

In 1989, a fire severely damaged Milton's Union Tavern (Thomas Day House), a National Historic Landmark, prompting a long-running restoration effort.

In 1994, the Piedmont Triad Visitor Center was established in Pelham to support tourism and provide resources for travelers; as of 2025, it offers information and assistance for area attractions and events.

In 1995, Canadian producer Zale Magder invested about $5 million to build a film‑production complex in Yanceyville, promoted as a “Hollywood East” campus with amenities such as jogging trails, a golf course, a restaurant, and a fitness center to attract filmmakers and movie stars. Although the venture hosted at least one feature and several commercials, it filed for bankruptcy in 1997; the property later operated as Carolina Pinnacle Studios under owner Faiger Blackwell before transitioning to non‑film uses.

In April 1997, the state dedicated the Dan River Prison Work Farm, a minimum-custody facility near Yanceyville, and began moving inmates into the facility. Built largely by inmate crews under Department of Correction engineers, the facility was designed for 650 inmates and initially added about 165 positions, roughly half filled by Caswell County residents; operations have included greenhouse and field production of produce for other prisons.

In 1998, the North Carolina Wildlife Resources Commission and Ducks Unlimited constructed the 14-acre Highrock Waterfowl Impoundment on the R. Wayne Bailey–Caswell Game Land, a state-managed wildlife area southeast of Yanceyville, to expand wetland habitat for waterfowl.

In the early 2000s, the region faced challenges including adapting to the Information Age and addressing the decline of the tobacco industry, which negatively affected the local economy, even as cultural tourism emerged as an economic contributor.

In 2007, Caswell Correctional Center, a medium-custody facility near Yanceyville, employed about 188 staff and offered on-site vocational training from Piedmont Community College, contributing state jobs and education services to the local economy.

Initiatives in the 2010s—such as the Caswell County Farmers Market, launched in 2013—were followed in the 2020s by new investments: Riverside Furniture Corporation’s $5.4 million, 300,000 sq ft (28,000 m^{2}) warehouse and distribution center (announced in 2020 to create 50 jobs); major 2020 and 2023 grants for Piedmont Community College’s CEAD agribusiness campus in Pelham; the county-funded CoSquare coworking hub in downtown Yanceyville; and, in 2024, Cherokee Tobacco’s planned $14 million, 65,000 sq ft (6,000 m^{2}) facility creating 39 jobs in Pelham.

By the 2020s, the local economy, while maintaining its agricultural roots, had further diversified across multiple sectors, including manufacturing, healthcare, education, food service, retail, and other service industries.

In 2020, the Caswell County Chamber of Commerce described the county as having a growing art community centered on the Milton Studio Art Gallery, which represented more than sixty regional artists. The county’s arts heritage includes painters such as Maud Gatewood and Benjamin Forrest Williams.

State and county-led investments in education, including the multimillion-dollar renovation of Bartlett Yancey High School in 2022, have supported workforce development by modernizing facilities and broadening opportunities through Piedmont Community College.

In the mid-2020s, broadband initiatives, including the state's Completing Access to Broadband (CAB) program, sought to expand high-speed internet availability in the county for households and businesses.

Although only a limited number of tobacco farms remain, the county's agricultural sector has adapted through farmers diversifying into other types of farming.

While water and sewer infrastructure needs have been pressing concerns in communities such as Yanceyville, independent sources have cited Caswell County's location within the Piedmont Triad region and the availability of developable industrial sites, including Pelham Business Park, as supporting business recruitment and economic development.

=== Civil War period ===
In May 1861, North Carolina, albeit with some reluctance, joined the Confederacy, which by then was at war with the Union. Caswell County provided troops, clothing, food, and tobacco in support of the war effort.

Companies A, C, and D of the 13th North Carolina Infantry Regiment consisted almost entirely of county enlistments. Men from the county served in North Carolina regiments in the Eastern Theater. These units fought in many of the major battles, including Williamsburg, Second Manassas, Antietam, Fredericksburg, Chancellorsville, Gettysburg, and the Appomattox campaign, and suffered heavy casualties.

At the 1860 U.S. census, 58.7 percent of Caswell County's population was enslaved. In January 1862, numerous African Americans in the county fled slavery. Seven patrol squads comprising 34 individuals were dispatched to Yanceyville in search of them. Whether any found safe haven behind Union lines at Fort Monroe in Hampton, Virginia, or elsewhere is unknown.

In the spring of 1862, salt used for meat preservation was rationed, which was a statewide measure. As the war raged on, the county's inhabitants faced food shortages. Daily necessities were in short supply. Speculators benefitted while most remained in need.

The minutes of the Caswell County Court of Pleas and Quarter Sessions from January 1863 to July 1866 were lost or destroyed; as a result, its proceedings for this period—including matters affecting the county's Black inhabitants—are not preserved in its minute books.

Following the Emancipation Proclamation (January 1, 1863), enslaved people in areas of rebellion were recognized as free by the U.S. federal government and could obtain military protection upon reaching Union lines or as federal troops advanced.

Because Caswell County remained behind Confederate lines until Union forces advanced into the North Carolina Piedmont during the Carolinas campaign in March–April 1865, few opportunities existed to reach Union protection. While numerous African Americans fled or attempted to flee the region to gain freedom permanently, most remained confined behind Confederate lines until April 1865.

=== Reconstruction era ===
After the Civil War during Reconstruction, the pattern of daily life in Caswell County dramatically changed. The previous plantation way of life had disappeared. Struggling small farmers fell into deeper poverty. Abandoned land and eroded soil permeated the landscape. The area struggled with a decreased standard of living and inadequate public revenue for essential services.

Many white citizens in the county resented the war's outcome and its aftermath, as did others in the North Carolina Piedmont area. Regional newspapers actively fomented their bitterness. When Congressional Reconstruction was established in 1867, it was characterized as an effort by Radical Republicans to force Black suffrage upon them. To resist perceived threats to the racial and social order, numerous county residents joined the Conservative Party, a loose coalition of prewar Democrats and former Whigs.

In the war’s aftermath, federal troops enforced emancipation, while the Freedmen's Bureau assisted formerly enslaved African Americans. The Thirteenth Amendment, ratified in December 1865, abolished slavery nationwide. However, in 1866, North Carolina’s Conservative-dominated General Assembly, which included many former Confederates, enacted restrictive laws known as Black Codes. Intended to reassert white control over African Americans, these laws were invalidated by congressional civil rights legislation later in 1866.

In January 1868, thirteen African American delegates representing 19 majority-Black counties attended the state's constitutional convention in Raleigh. They were North Carolina's first Black Caucus. Their members included a Republican legislator from Caswell County named Wilson Carey. At the convention, he opposed a Conservative proposal to increase white immigration, arguing that the focus should remain on African American North Carolinians whose labor "built up the State to where it was."

The 1868 constitutional convention passed resolutions abolishing slavery, adopting universal male suffrage, removing property and religious qualifications for voting and office holding, and establishing a uniform public school system. Because the convention gave North Carolina a new constitution in 1868 that protected the rights of African Americans, the state was readmitted to the Union that same year on July 4 upon ratification of the Fourteenth Amendment.

In 1869, the Republican-controlled General Assembly ratified the Fifteenth Amendment. Ensuring the right to vote regardless of race, color, or previous condition of servitude, the Fifteenth Amendment became a part of the U.S. Constitution in February 1870. In that year's U.S. census, African Americans represented approximately 59 percent of Caswell County's population. Over a span of roughly four years, from December 1865 to February 1870, they had gained constitutional protections of freedom and voting rights, as well as access to employment, public accommodations, land, and political participation.

County and statewide Conservatives vehemently opposed Black enfranchisement, seeing it as a threat to their power and the perceived racial hierarchy. Their hostility had intensified when Republican gubernatorial candidate William W. Holden endorsed universal male suffrage at the party's state convention in March 1867.

The suffrage resolution's passage and Holden's victory in 1868 substantially added to the continuing friction. This growing animosity helped make Caswell County and the region a hotbed of Ku Klux Klan activity. African Americans and their supporters in the area were subsequently subjected to a campaign of violence, intimidation, and murder to prevent them from voting.

On February 26, 1870, the Klan lynched Wyatt Outlaw, an African American town commissioner and constable in Alamance County. As Klan violence spread into nearby Caswell County, the Republican state senator of the area, John W. Stephens, became increasingly fearful of attack. On May 21, he went to the courthouse in Yanceyville to convince the former Democratic county sheriff, Frank A. Wiley, to seek re-election as a Republican with his support and thus achieve a political reconciliation in the county.

Wiley had secretly agreed to work with the Klan and lured Stephens into a trap, whereby he was choked with a rope and stabbed to death by Klansmen in a vacant courthouse room. The county's sheriff, Jessie C. Griffith, himself a Klansman and prominent Conservative, made little effort to investigate the assassination.

Holden was outraged by the murders of Wyatt Outlaw and John W. Stephens. Conferring with his advisers, he decided to raise a militia to combat the Klan in Caswell and Alamance counties. By July 8, he declared both counties to be in a state of insurrection.

About 350 militiamen, led by Colonel George Washington Kirk, arrived on July 18 and established headquarters in Yanceyville. The militia arrested 19 men in the county as well as several dozen more in Alamance County, and Klan activities in both counties promptly ceased. The prisoners were initially denied habeas corpus before being turned over to local courts, which did not convict any of the accused. On November 10, Holden declared that there was no longer a state of insurrection in Alamance and Caswell counties.

In December 1870, the state legislature, which had a Conservative majority that had come into power on the heels of the political backlash they had spearheaded against Holden over the incident, impeached him on eight charges. He was convicted on six of them and removed from office in March 1871. Holden's removal severely weakened the Republican Party in the state.

The Conservative Party proceeded to institute white supremacy in state government in 1876. They dropped the name "Conservative" that same year to become the Democratic Party. When federal troops left the next year, ending Reconstruction, the stage was set for the further passage of Jim Crow laws.

=== School desegregation ===
In the 20th century, during the era of school segregation in the United States, many African American students in Caswell County attended Caswell County Training School, later renamed Caswell County High School in the early 1960s. Vanessa Siddle Walker's 1996 book, Their Highest Potential: An African American School Community in the Segregated South, provides detailed insights into this school, which is no longer in operation and now a designated site on the National Register of Historic Places in Caswell County.

By the end of the 1960s, Caswell County's public schools were beginning to fully integrate. A decade and a half earlier in 1954, the U.S. Supreme Court ruled in Brown v. Board of Education that racial segregation in public schools was unconstitutional.

In a later decision by the Court in May 1955 known as Brown II, school districts were given the ambiguous order to desegregate "with all deliberate speed." Like many school boards in the South at the time, the Caswell County Board of Education interpreted the Court's ambiguity in a manner that served to delay, obstruct, and slow the process of racially integrating its schools.

The Board of Education's resistance to integration had already been emboldened by North Carolina's passage of the Pupil Assignment Act in April 1955. The legislation gave county school boards full school placement authority. Driven by the act's power, the Pearshall Plan's passage, and the prevailing anti-integration sentiment of the white community, the school district kept assigning children to schools in a segregated manner.

In response to these developments, fifteen local African American parents presented a petition to the school district in August 1956 calling for the abolition of segregation, which the board refused to consider. Undeterred, the parents organized protests that included the NAACP. A federal lawsuit was subsequently filed in December 1956 asking for the immediate desegregation of Caswell County and North Carolina schools.

In August 1957, 43 local students, many of whom were plaintiffs via their parents in the federal court case, applied for admission to public schools that were closer to their homes than the segregated ones they had been assigned. The school board denied their applications and continued to reject them through 1962. Nevertheless, the federal lawsuit kept moving forward.

In December 1961, U.S. District Court Judge Edwin M. Stanley ruled that two brothers, Charlie and Fred Saunders, could promptly attend Archibald Murphey Elementary School, a now-closed, formerly all-white school near Milton. However, when the new semester began in January, they did not enroll. The Ku Klux Klan had sent a threatening letter to the Saunders family previously.

According to an affidavit submitted by the children's father, C.H. Saunders Sr., the KKK's threats caused him to miss a school board reassignment hearing ordered by the judge in August 1961, before his final judgment in December. Saunders also stated that he would be agreeable to transferring schools if his children's protection at Murphey Elementary could be assured.

A year after the Saunders decision, Stanley ruled that the school district had been improperly administering the Pupil Assignment Act. In December 1962, he told the school boards of Caswell County and the city of Durham to allow every schoolchild complete freedom of choice regarding school placement. On January 22, 1963, sixteen African American schoolchildren enrolled in four of the county's previously all-white schools.

On their first day of school, a group of white youths harassed and threatened one of the parents, Jasper Brown—a local civil rights activist and farmer. As Brown drove home, he was pursued. After his vehicle was forced to a halt, Brown fired, wounding two white men, before turning himself in to the police. The incident was soon reported to Attorney General Robert F. Kennedy due to its gravity.

Several months later, Brown was convicted of assault with a deadly weapon and served 90 days in jail, though contemporaneous accounts had characterized the shooting as self‑defense. While awaiting trial, white men bombed his yard. According to contemporaneous reporting on an NAACP lawsuit, students who integrated the county’s schools faced physical threats and emotional abuse, and the suit alleged that officials failed to provide police protection or bus transportation.

By late 1967, only 57 African American children out of a Black student population of approximately 3,000 were attending integrated public schools in Caswell County. While there had been some faculty and administration integration, the less than two percent enrollment rate effectively upheld segregation.

The school district's integration plan had not fostered sufficient desegregation. Its "freedom of choice" plan placed the burden of integration on individual African American students and parents, requiring them to cross the color line voluntarily. Those who did so often faced social stigma, severe discrimination, and other hardships. Consequently, many families—though supportive of integration efforts—kept their children in Black schools that they valued, such as Caswell County High School.

The school district's low integration rate resulted in the U.S. Office of Education citing the county in 1966 as one of seven in the state that were not in compliance with its civil rights Title IV guidelines. The bureau began taking steps to cut off federal funding.

The school district was not in full compliance with federal integration standards until 1969. In that year, the Caswell County Board of Education implemented a plan for complete desegregation after Judge Stanley ordered the school district in August 1968 to integrate starting in the 1969–1970 school year.

When school integration and consolidation subsequently occurred, Bartlett Yancey High School in Yanceyville became the only public high school in the county after Caswell County High School's closure in 1969. The closed high school building's educational use was promptly reconfigured. The new integrated school was named N. L. Dillard Junior High School in honor of Nicholas Longworth Dillard, the former principal of Caswell County High School. Integrated elementary schools were established based on zoning.

=== Notable political figures ===
Caswell County has produced notable political leaders throughout its history, including Wilson Carey, Donna Edwards, John H. Kerr, Archibald Murphey, Romulus Mitchell Saunders, John W. Stephens, and Bartlett Yancey.

Legislators from the county had considerable influence on state politics during the first half of the 19th century. Bartlett Yancey was speaker of the North Carolina Senate from 1817 to 1827. Romulus M. Saunders was concurrently speaker of the North Carolina House of Commons from 1819 to 1820.

Archibald Murphey, who was born in Caswell County, has been called North Carolina's "Father of Education." Serving as a state senator, he proposed a publicly financed system of education in 1817. Murphey also made proposals regarding internal improvements and constitutional reform.

Reconstruction-era Republican state senator John W. Stephens, a Caswell County representative in the North Carolina Senate and local agent of the Freedmen's Bureau, worked to expand Black political participation and civil rights; his assassination by Ku Klux Klan members in the Yanceyville courthouse in May 1870 helped trigger Governor William W. Holden’s declaration of insurrection and the Kirk–Holden war.

Reconstruction-era African American politician Wilson Carey represented Caswell County as a Republican in both the 1868 and 1875 North Carolina constitutional conventions and served in the North Carolina House of Representatives from 1868 to 1870, from 1874 to 1880, and again in 1889.

Another notable political figure with roots in the county was John H. Kerr, born in Yanceyville, who represented North Carolina's 2nd district in the United States House of Representatives for fifteen consecutive terms from 1923 to 1953.

Donna Edwards, a former U.S. congresswoman who represented Maryland's 4th congressional district from 2008 to 2017 and was the first African American woman to represent Maryland in Congress, was born in Yanceyville. A Democrat, she served on several congressional committees and supported historically Black colleges, women's reproductive rights, and a constitutional amendment to overturn the Supreme Court's Citizens United decision.

=== Depiction in the arts ===
The 2008 documentary Meeting David Wilson followed an African American filmmaker tracing his family lineage, which led him from Ghana to Caswell County. There, he discovered that his ancestors had been enslaved on a tobacco plantation still owned by the same family that had controlled it before the Civil War. The filmmaker, David Wilson, met the current owner, also named David Wilson, to explore the land and the intertwined history of their families, shaped by the legacy of slavery.

Writers, including Alex Haley, and artists, such as Maud Gatewood, have also referenced Caswell County's history in their work. The county was mentioned in Haley's 1977 television miniseries Roots, where it was cited as the location of champion cockfighter and plantation owner Tom Moore's (Chuck Connors) estate. When Gatewood designed the county seal in 1974, she included two large tobacco leaves as a symbol of the crop's long-standing prominence in the area.

== Geography ==
According to the U.S. Census Bureau, the county has a total area of 428.71 square miles (1,110.4 km^{2}), of which 425.37 square miles (1,101.7 km^{2}) is land and 3.34 square miles (8.7 km^{2}) (0.78%) is water. It is bordered by Person, Orange, Alamance, and Rockingham counties, and the state of Virginia. The Dan River flows through a part of the county. Hyco Lake is an important resource and a popular recreational site.

For a comprehensive overview of Caswell County's geography see When the Past Refused to Die: A History of Caswell County North Carolina 1777–1977, by William S. Powell (1977) at 1–22.

=== State and local protected areas ===
- Animal Park at the Conservators Center
- R. Wayne Bailey-Caswell Game Land

=== Major water bodies ===
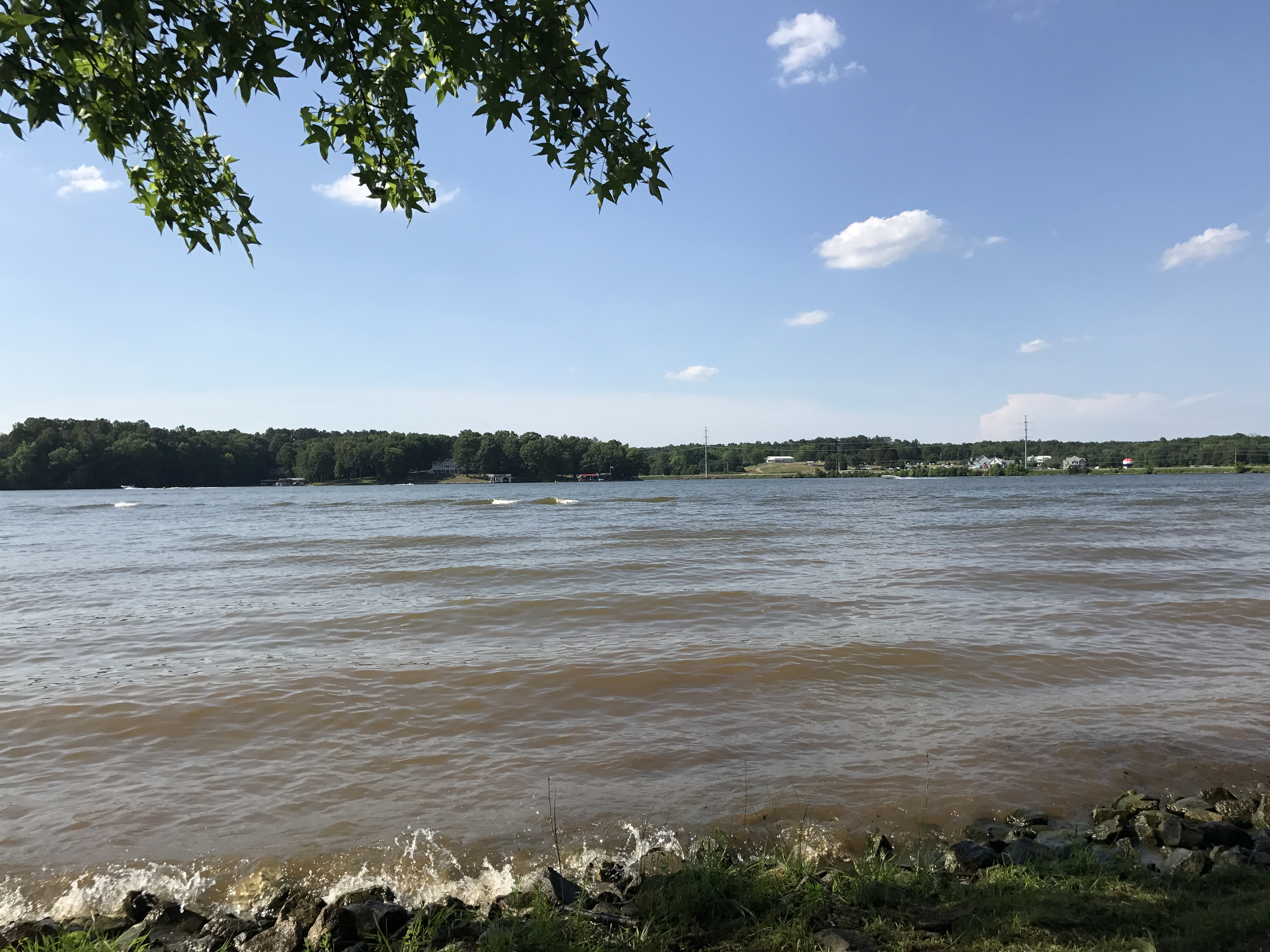
Hyco Lake

- Country Line Creek
- Dan River
- S.R. Farmer Lake
- Hogans Creek
- Hyco Creek
- Hyco Lake
- Lynch Creek
- Moon Creek
- North Fork Rattlesnake Creek
- South Hyco Creek
- Sugartree Creek
- Wildwood Lake

=== Adjacent counties ===
- Person County – east
- Orange County – southeast
- Alamance County – south
- Rockingham County – west
- Pittsylvania County, Virginia – north
- Halifax County, Virginia – north
- Danville, Virginia (independent city) – north

== Demographics ==
Caswell County, North Carolina – Racial and ethnic composition Note: the US Census treats Hispanic/Latino as an ethnic category. This table excludes Latinos from the racial categories and assigns them to a separate category. Hispanics/Latinos may be of any race.
Race / Ethnicity (NH = Non-Hispanic)	Pop 1980	Pop 1990	Pop 2000	Pop 2010	Pop 2020	% 1980	% 1990	% 2000	% 2010	% 2020
White alone (NH)	11,591	12,099	14,239	14,513	14,036	55.98%	58.47%	60.59%	61.19%	61.73%
Black or African American alone (NH)	8,921	8,409	8,557	7,991	6,804	43.09%	40.64%	36.41%	33.69%	29.93%
Native American or Alaska Native alone (NH)	13	24	39	70	65	0.06%	0.12%	0.17%	0.30%	0.29%
Asian alone (NH)	20	19	36	60	61	0.10%	0.09%	0.15%	0.25%	0.27%
Native Hawaiian or Pacific Islander alone (NH)	x	x	5	4	13	x	x	0.02%	0.02%	0.06%
Other race alone (NH)	1	6	29	13	57	0.00%	0.03%	0.12%	0.05%	0.25%
Mixed race or Multiracial (NH)	x	x	181	324	698	x	x	0.77%	1.37%	3.07%
Hispanic or Latino (any race)	159	136	415	744	1,002	0.77%	0.66%	1.77%	3.14%	4.41%
Total	20,705	20,693	23,501	23,719	22,736	100.00%	100.00%	100.00%	100.00%	100.00%

=== 2020 census ===
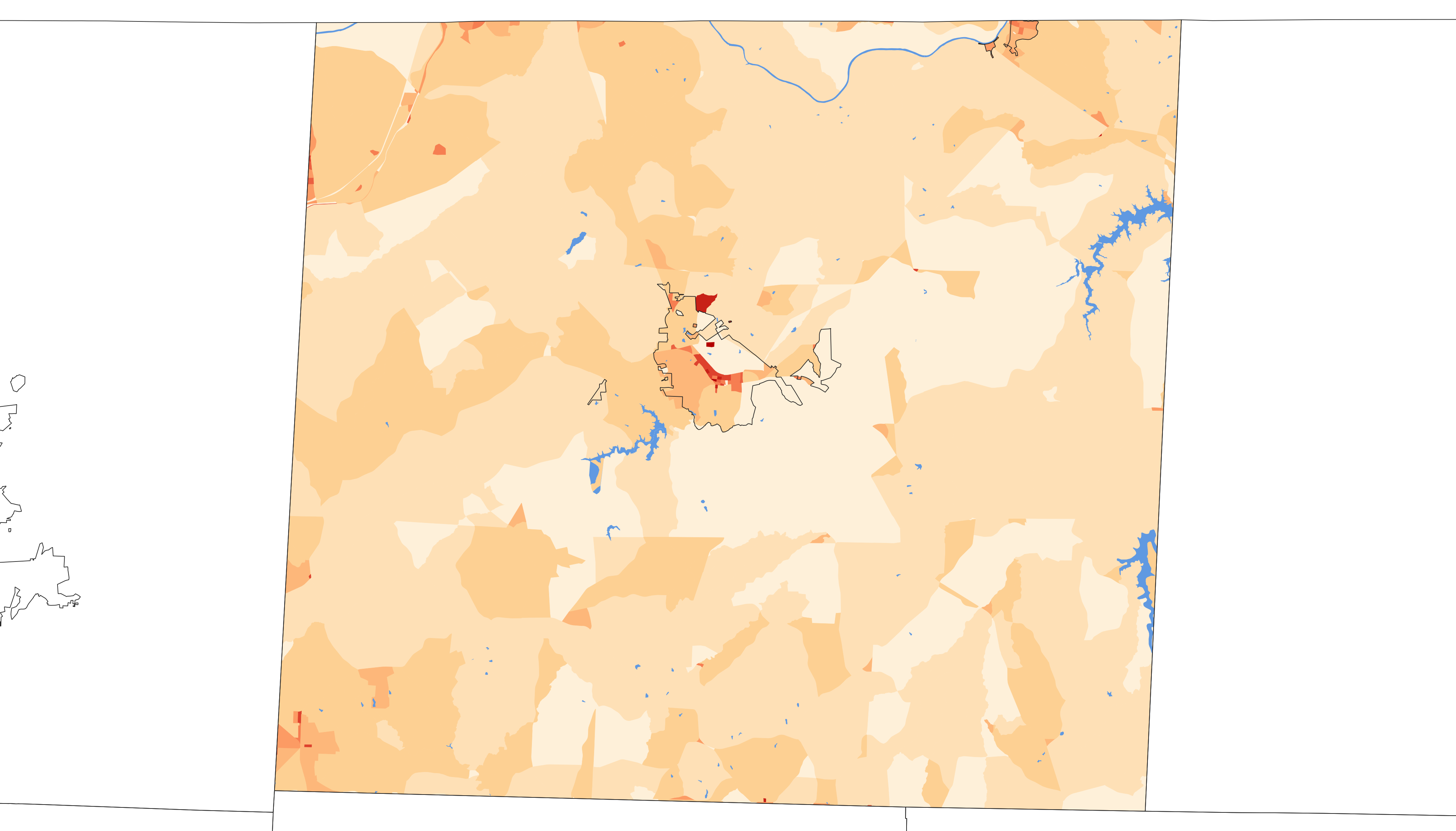
2020 population density of Caswell County NC by census block

As of the 2020 census, there were 22,736 people and 9,124 households residing in the county, including 6,186 families. The median age was 47.6 years, 18.2% of residents were under the age of 18, 22.4% of residents were 65 years of age or older, and there were 105.3 males for every 100 females, or 106.0 males per 100 females age 18 and over.

Of all households, 25.4% had children under the age of 18 living in them, 45.1% were married-couple households, 19.5% were households with a male householder and no spouse or partner present, and 30.8% were households with a female householder and no spouse or partner present; 30.7% of all households were made up of individuals and 15.3% had someone living alone who was 65 years of age or older.

There were 10,444 housing units, of which 12.6% were vacant. Among occupied housing units, 75.0% were owner-occupied and 25.0% were renter-occupied, with a homeowner vacancy rate of 1.3% and a rental vacancy rate of 6.1%.

The racial makeup of the county was 62.6% White, 30.0% Black or African American, 0.4% American Indian and Alaska Native, 0.3% Asian, 0.1% Native Hawaiian and Pacific Islander, 2.4% from some other race, and 4.2% from two or more races, while Hispanic or Latino residents of any race comprised 4.4% of the population.

0.2% of residents lived in urban areas, while 99.8% lived in rural areas.

Historical population
Census	Pop.	Note	%±
1790	10,096		—
1800	8,701		−13.8%
1810	11,757		35.1%
1820	13,253		12.7%
1830	15,185		14.6%
1840	14,693		−3.2%
1850	15,269		3.9%
1860	16,215		6.2%
1870	16,081		−0.8%
1880	17,825		10.8%
1890	16,028		−10.1%
1900	15,028		−6.2%
1910	14,858		−1.1%
1920	15,759		6.1%
1930	18,214		15.6%
1940	20,032		10.0%
1950	20,870		4.2%
1960	19,912		−4.6%
1970	19,055		−4.3%
1980	20,705		8.7%
1990	20,693		−0.1%
2000	23,501		13.6%
2010	23,719		0.9%
2020	22,736		−4.1%
2025 (est.)	22,563	▼	−0.8%
U.S. Decennial Census; 1790–1960 1900–1990; 1990–2000 2010 2020

=== 2010 census ===
At the 2010 census, there were 23,719 people and an estimated 8,788 households and 6,345 families residing in Caswell County. In 2010, the estimated median age was 42.8 years. For every 100 females, there were an estimated 103.7 males.

=== 2000 census ===
At the 2000 census, there were 23,501 people and an estimated 8,670 households and 6,398 families residing in the county. The population density was 55 people per square mile (21 people/km^{2}). There were 9,601 housing units at an average density of 23 units per square mile (8.9 units/km^{2}). The racial makeup of the county was 61.07% White, 36.52% African American, 1.77% Hispanic or Latino, 0.19% Native American, 0.15% Asian, 0.03% Pacific Islander, 1.17% from other races, and 0.86% from two or more races.

Out of the 8,670 households, 31.00% had children under the age of 18 living with them, 55.20% were married couples living together, 14.20% had a female householder with no husband present, and 26.20% were non-families. 23.20% of all households consisted of individuals living alone and 10.20% had someone living alone who was 65 years of age or older. The average household size was 2.56 and the average family size was 3.01.

The age distribution of the county's population consisted of 23.20% under the age of 18, 7.70% from 18 to 24, 30.10% from 25 to 44, 26.00% from 45 to 64, and 13.00% who were 65 years of age or older. The median age was 38 years. For every 100 females, there were 102.50 males. For every 100 females age 18 and over, there were 102.30 males.

The median income for a household in the county was $35,018 and the median income for a family was $41,905. Males had a median income of $28,968 versus $22,339 for females. The per capita income for the county was $16,470. About 10.90% of families and 14.40% of the population were below the poverty line, including 18.30% of those under age 18 and 21.10% of those age 65 and over.

== Government and politics ==
Seated in Yanceyville, Caswell County's government consists of 28 departments, an elected board of commissioners, a clerk to the board, and an appointed county manager. The county has additional central administration, Cooperative Extension, E-911, and Juvenile Crime Prevention Council staff.

The county lies within the bounds of the 22nd Prosecutorial District, the 17A Superior Court District, and the 17A District Court District.

Caswell County is part of the 13th congressional district and a member of the Piedmont Triad Council of Governments.

United States presidential election results for Caswell County, North Carolina
Year	Republican		Democratic		Third party(ies)	
Year	No.	%	No.	%	No.	%
1912	154	17.04%	705	77.99%	45	4.98%
1916	338	28.48%	849	71.52%	0	0.00%
1920	505	28.96%	1,239	71.04%	0	0.00%
1924	467	30.21%	1,075	69.53%	4	0.26%
1928	749	44.45%	936	55.55%	0	0.00%
1932	169	8.31%	1,858	91.39%	6	0.30%
1936	207	7.67%	2,493	92.33%	0	0.00%
1940	351	13.07%	2,335	86.93%	0	0.00%
1944	492	20.37%	1,923	79.63%	0	0.00%
1948	351	14.63%	1,651	68.82%	397	16.55%
1952	973	27.25%	2,597	72.75%	0	0.00%
1956	1,204	32.79%	2,468	67.21%	0	0.00%
1960	1,272	30.99%	2,832	69.01%	0	0.00%
1964	1,793	41.64%	2,513	58.36%	0	0.00%
1968	1,036	17.20%	2,137	35.47%	2,851	47.33%
1972	2,983	59.65%	1,922	38.43%	96	1.92%
1976	1,761	32.08%	3,707	67.54%	21	0.38%
1980	2,156	37.32%	3,529	61.09%	92	1.59%
1984	3,992	48.84%	4,157	50.86%	25	0.31%
1988	3,299	43.93%	4,189	55.79%	21	0.28%
1992	2,793	33.40%	4,725	56.50%	845	10.10%
1996	3,310	40.57%	4,312	52.86%	536	6.57%
2000	4,270	50.70%	4,091	48.58%	61	0.72%
2004	4,868	51.58%	4,539	48.10%	30	0.32%
2008	5,208	47.95%	5,545	51.05%	109	1.00%
2012	5,594	50.67%	5,348	48.45%	97	0.88%
2016	6,026	54.44%	4,792	43.29%	252	2.28%
2020	7,089	58.82%	4,860	40.33%	102	0.85%
2024	7,445	61.84%	4,493	37.32%	102	0.85%

=== Elected officials ===
In August 2025, Caswell County's elected officials were:

- Tony Durden, Jr. (D), Caswell County Sheriff
- John Satterfield (D), Clerk of Superior Court
- Ginny S. Mitchell (D), Caswell County Register of Deeds

Caswell County Board of Commissioners:

- John Clagget (R)
- Finch Holt (R)
- Greg Ingram (D)
- Frank Rose (R), (Vice Chair)
- Tony Smith (R)
- Brian Totten (D)
- Tim Yarbrough (R), (Chairman)

North Carolina General Assembly representatives:

- Senate: Graig R. Meyer (D–23rd)
- House: Renee Price (D–50th)

U.S. House of Representatives:

- Brad Knott (R–13th)

== Economy ==
Caswell County is in the Piedmont Triad and near Danville, Virginia and the Research Triangle, giving residents access to regional employment centers, services, and institutions.

As of 2023, major employers in the area include Caswell County Schools (the county's largest employer), the NCDAC’s Caswell Correctional Center and Dan River Prison Work Farm, and Piedmont Community College’s Caswell County Campus.

Prominent industries in the county include agriculture, manufacturing, education, food service, healthcare, retail, and other service industries. Manufactured goods include textiles, clothing, electronics, and industrial maintenance chemicals.

Caswell County's economy is rooted in agriculture, and its agricultural sector has diversified beyond tobacco cultivation. The area's location, commercial properties, land primed for development, and relatively low property tax rate have contributed to an increase in business activity and entrepreneurship.

The county's agricultural sector produces hemp, tobacco, soybeans, corn, wheat, oats, barley, hay, alfalfa, beef cattle, sheep, swine, and poultry. The county also produces minerals such as soapstone, graphite, mica, corundum, microcline, and beryl.

NC Cooperative Extension in Yanceyville connects local agribusinesses and farmers with crucial research-based information and technology. The Caswell County Local Foods Council manages the Caswell County Farmers Market in Yanceyville and initiates community-driven projects.

The county hosts two industrial parks—Pelham Business Park and Yanceyville Business Park. Cherokee Tobacco Company’s planned production and distribution facility will be located at Pelham Business Park. CoSquare, a coworking space that fosters entrepreneurship and remote work, is in Yanceyville’s downtown historic district. Caswell County has been described as a prime location for growth in the information technology and manufacturing sectors.

On its website, the county lists the North Carolina Economic Development Association (NCEDA) and the Piedmont Triad Partnership as economic development partners.

The county's property tax rate was $0.585 per $100 of assessed value in FY 2024–25, and third‑party estimates placed the county's effective property tax burden for homeowners at about 0.69% (median annual bill roughly $957).

Caswell County is designated a Tier 1 county in North Carolina's 2025 County Distress Rankings, a state system used to prioritize economic development funding and incentives.

== Infrastructure ==
=== Utilities ===
Caswell County's electric system is maintained by Duke Energy and Piedmont Electric Cooperative.

=== Public safety ===
Caswell County's public safety services are managed by several agencies:

- Law Enforcement: The Caswell County Sheriff's Office provides law enforcement services and operates the county detention center.
- Fire Protection: Fire protection is handled by volunteer fire departments, including the Yanceyville Fire Department.
- Emergency Medical Services (EMS): Caswell County Emergency Medical Services (CCEMS) delivers medical transport and pre-hospital emergency care.
- Emergency Management: Caswell Emergency Management (CEM) oversees disaster preparedness and response for the county.

==== Correctional facilities ====
- Caswell Correctional Center, a medium-custody facility of the North Carolina Department of Adult Correction.
- Dan River Prison Work Farm, a minimum-custody facility of the North Carolina Department of Adult Correction

=== Transportation ===
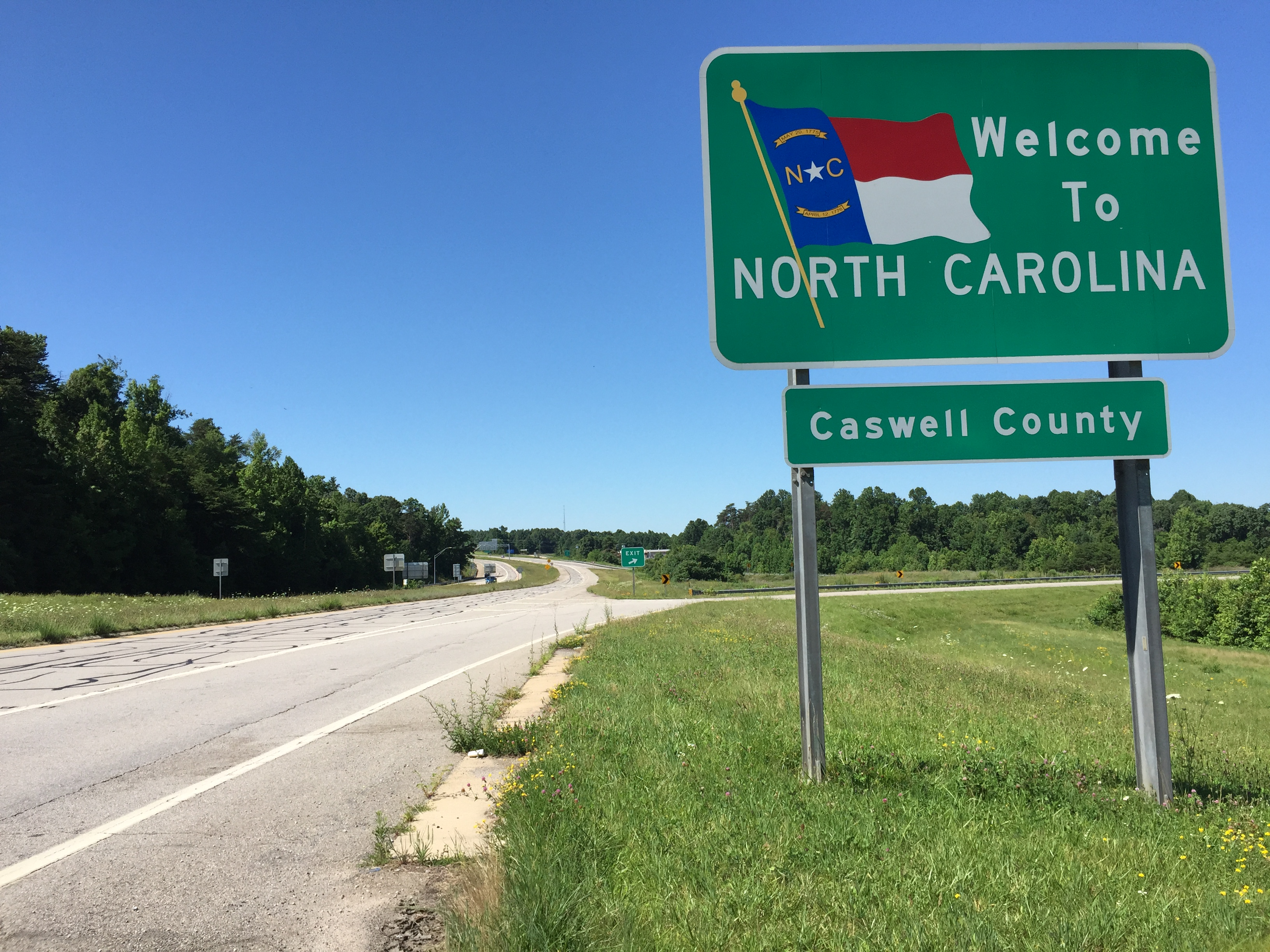
Entering Caswell County from Danville, Virginia, on US 29

==== Major highways ====
- Future I-785
- US 29
- US 29 Bus.
- US 58
- US 158
- NC 49
- NC 57
- NC 62
- NC 86
- NC 87
- NC 119
- NC 150
- NC 700

Interstate 40 and Interstate 85 are the closest interstate highways to the county, located 14 miles (23 km) south in Graham. When I-785 is completed, it will run through Caswell County near Pelham.

==== Airports ====
- Yanceyville Municipal Airport
- Danville Regional Airport, located 15.3 miles (25 km) north of Yanceyville
- Person County Airport, located 26.2 miles (42 km) southeast of Yanceyville
- Burlington-Alamance Regional Airport, located 29.4 miles (47 km) southwest of Yanceyville
- Piedmont Triad International Airport, located 46.5 miles (75 km) southwest of Yanceyville
- Raleigh-Durham International Airport, located 56 miles (90 km) southeast of Yanceyville

==== Public transit ====
- Caswell County Area Transportation System (CATS)

==== Nearby rail access ====
Danville station, located 13.9 miles (22 km) north of Yanceyville

== Education ==
=== Higher education ===
Piedmont Community College's branch campus in Caswell County is located in Yanceyville.

=== Primary and secondary education ===
The Caswell County public school system has six schools ranging from pre-kindergarten to twelfth grade. The school district operates one high school, one middle school, and four elementary schools:

- Bartlett Yancey High School
- N.L. Dillard Middle School
- North Elementary School
- Oakwood Elementary School
- South Elementary School
- Stoney Creek Elementary School

=== Libraries ===
Gunn Memorial Public Library (in Yanceyville) offers summer reading programs for children of all ages, as well as year-round programs for all age groups.

== Healthcare ==
Caswell Family Medical Center is the county's largest primary care provider, also offering urgent care, specialty care, and behavioral health services.

Other health care providers in the county include:

- Caswell County Health Department Clinic, offering primary care for all ages and public health services such as family planning, maternal health, and WIC nutrition assistance
- Caswell House, a senior living facility providing accommodations and support
- Sovah Family Medicine-Yanceyville, a family medicine practice
- Yanceyville Rehabilitation and Healthcare Center, a skilled nursing and rehabilitation facility

== Arts, culture, and recreation ==
=== Arts ===
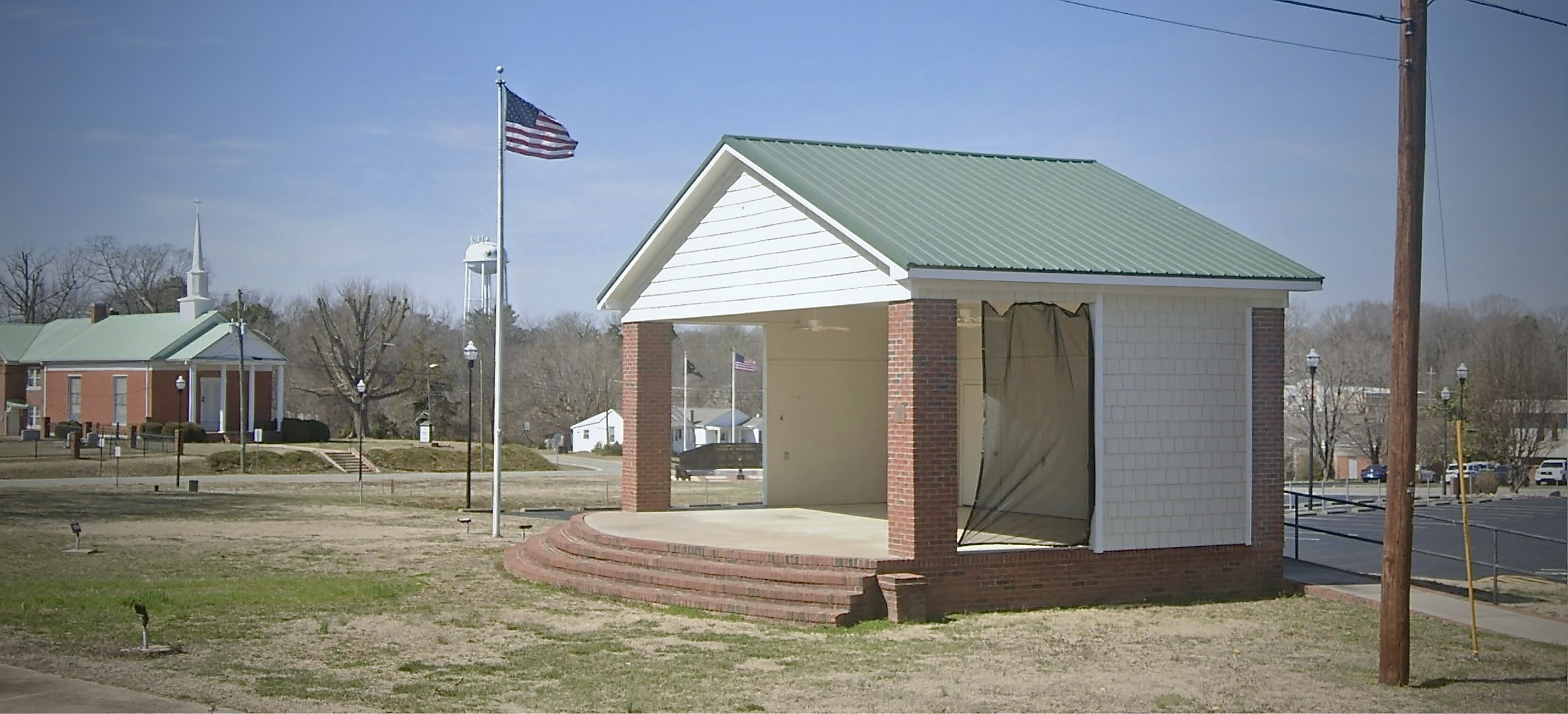
Yanceyville Town Pavilion

The Caswell County Civic Center, located in Yanceyville, has a full-size professionally equipped stage, a 912-seat auditorium, and meeting and banquet facilities for up to 500. It also includes accessories for concerts, theatre, and social functions, as well as a lobby art gallery.

Events and performances are also held at the Yanceyville Town Pavilion.

Additional arts-related attractions include:

- Caswell Council for the Arts (in Yanceyville)
- Milton Studio Art Gallery (in Milton)
- Yanceyville Museum of Art

=== Historic landmarks ===
Caswell County contains one of North Carolina’s most notable concentrations of antebellum architecture, reflected in the Milton and Yanceyville historic districts as well as numerous individually listed properties on the National Register of Historic Places. Downtown Yanceyville's historic district contains an antebellum courthouse designed by William Percival and several other examples of antebellum architecture.

In addition to the Yanceyville Historic District, the following are included on the National Register of Historic Places in Caswell County:

- Bartlett Yancey House
- Caswell County Training School (later Caswell County High School)
- Graves House
- Garland-Buford House
- Milton Historic District
- Poteat House
- Red House Presbyterian Church
- Thomas Day House/Union Tavern
- Warren House and Warren's Store
- William Henry and Sarah Holderness House
- Woodside

=== Other cultural attractions ===
Caswell County hosts three major festivals annually:

- The Bright Leaf Hoedown, held in late September in downtown Yanceyville, has live entertainment, food vendors, crafts, and hosts nonprofit organizations, drawing over 5,000 guests.
- The Caswell County Historical Association hosts an annual Heritage Festival in Yanceyville every May. This event celebrates local history through tours, living history reenactments, games, vendors, and live music.
- The Spring Fling, a two-day event, takes place in late April or early May at the Providence Volunteer Fire Department.

Additional points of interest and amenities include:

- Caswell County Farmers Market (in Yanceyville)
- Caswell County Veterans Memorial (in Yanceyville)
- Caswell Horticulture Club (in Blanch)
- Fulton-Walton Fellowship Center (in Yanceyville)
- Milton Renaissance Foundation Museum & Visitors Center (in Milton)
- Piedmont Triad Visitor Center (in Pelham)
- Old Caswell County Jail (in Yanceyville)
- Old Poteat School/Poteat One-Room School (in Yanceyville)
- Yanceyville Caswell Museum of History (in Yanceyville)
- Shangri-La Miniature Stone Village (in Prospect Hill)
- Simmons Farm Museum (near Stony Creek)
- Town of Yanceyville 9/11 Memorial
- Town of Yanceyville Public Safety Memorial
- Yanceyville's municipal water tower (landmark)
- Yoder's Country Market (in Yanceyville)

=== Dialects ===
Caswell County's proximity to Virginia, the Carolina coast, and the foothills of the Appalachian results in a mix of Southern American English dialects, including Virginia Piedmont, Coastal Southern, South Midland, and African American English.

=== Parks and recreation ===
Indoor and outdoor recreational facilities, as well as sports programs and activities, are offered by the Caswell County Department of Parks & Recreation.

The Caswell Senior Center offers recreation and fitness facilities focused on well-being.

Additional recreational areas and attractions include:

- Animal Park at the Conservators Center (in Anderson Township)
- Caswell Community Arboretum (in Yanceyville)
- Caswell Game Land (near Yanceyville)
- Caswell Pines Golf Club (in Yanceyville Township)
- Cherokee Scout Reservation's Scouting America camp (near S.R. Farmer Lake)
- Country Line Creek (in Caswell Game Land)
- The Dan River (in Milton)
- Flying Disc Clubhouse's disc golf course (in Yanceyville)
- Hyco Creek (in Caswell Game Land)
- Hyco Lake (near Semora)
- Maud F. Gatewood Municipal Park (in Yanceyville)
- MBros Park (in Yanceyville)
- Orchard Lake Trail, a 2.9-mile (4.7 km) loop trail in Yanceyville suitable for birding, hiking, and mountain biking
- S.R. Farmer Lake (in Yanceyville Township), offering fishing, boating, and hiking opportunities
- Yanceyville Park/Memorial Park (in Yanceyville)
- Ziggy's Refuge (in Providence), an animal sanctuary with tours by appointment; featured in the 2025 Disney+ documentary Pets

== Communities ==
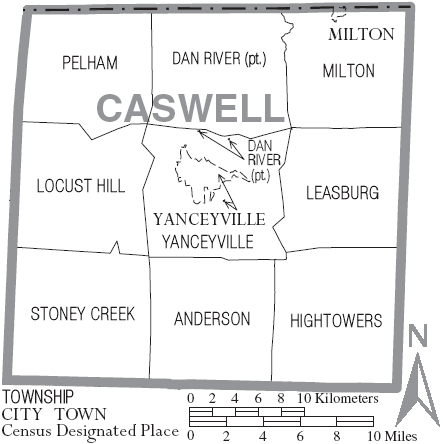
Map of Caswell County with municipal and township labels

=== Towns ===
- Milton
- Yanceyville (county seat and largest community)

=== Unincorporated communities ===
- Blanch
- Camp Springs
- Casville
- Cherry Grove
- Estelle
- Fitch
- Frogsboro
- Hightowers
- Jericho
- Leasburg
- Milesville
- Osmond
- Pelham
- Prospect Hill
- Providence
- Purley
- Quick
- Semora
- Stony Creek

=== Townships ===
The following townships are in Caswell County:

- Anderson
- Dan River
- Hightowers
- Leasburg
- Locust Hill
- Milton
- Pelham
- Stoney Creek
- Yanceyville

== Notable people ==
=== Academia ===
- N. L. Dillard (1906-1969), educator and principal of Caswell County Training School (later Caswell County High School)
- A. Oveta Fuller (1955–2022), associate professor of microbiology at University of Michigan Medical School
- Henry Lee Graves (1813–1881), president of Baylor University
- William Louis Poteat (1856–1938), president of Wake Forest University, early advocate of Darwinian evolution
- Henry Roland Totten (1892–1974), botanist
- Vanessa Siddle Walker (born 1958), professor emerita of African American educational studies at Emory University

=== Art, literature, and music ===
- The Badgett Sisters, folk and gospel group composed of sisters Celester, Connie, and Cleonia Badgett
- Glen Brown (1854–1932), architect and historian
- Max Drake (born 1952), musician
- Maud Gatewood (1934–2004), artist
- Carlton Haney (1928–2011), booking agent, festival promoter, and songwriter
- Mel Melton, musician
- Ida Isabella Poteat (1858–1940), artist and instructor
- Moses Roper (1815–1891), African American abolitionist, author, and orator
- Ray Scott (born 1969), country music artist
- Carolina Slim (1923–1953), Piedmont blues guitarist and singer
- Hazel Smith (1934–2018), journalist, publicist, singer-songwriter, television and radio show host, cookbook author
- Laurence Stallings (1894–1968), playwright, screenwriter, and novelist
- Benjamin Forrest Williams (1925–2017), artist and art curator

=== Athletes ===
- Mic'hael Brooks (born 1991), former NFL player who attended high school in Yanceyville
- John Gunn (1939–2010), race car driver
- Lee Pulliam (born 1988), stock car racing driver and team owner
- Neal Watlington (1922–2019), MLB player for the Philadelphia Athletics
- Carl Willis (born 1960), former MLB player and current pitching coach for the Cleveland Guardians

=== Business ===
- Thomas Day (1801–1861), free Black furniture craftsman and cabinetmaker
- Edmund Richardson (1818–1886), entrepreneur who produced and marketed cotton
- Samuel Simeon Fels (1860–1950), businessman and philanthropist

=== Government and law ===
- Samuel Bason (1894–1986), member of the North Carolina Senate
- Bedford Brown (1795–1870), U.S. senator
- Wilson Carey (1831–c. 1905), Reconstruction era politician serving in the North Carolina House of Representatives
- Richard Caswell (1729–1789), first and fifth governor of North Carolina
- Archibald Dixon (1802–1876), U.S. senator
- Donna Edwards (born 1958), former U.S. representative
- Azariah Graves (1768–1850), general in the North Carolina militia during the War of 1812 and a state senator
- Calvin Graves (1804–1877), member of the North Carolina House of Commons and North Carolina Senate
- John Kerr Hendrick (1849–1921), U.S. representative
- Louisa Moore Holt (1833–1899), First Lady of North Carolina
- John Kerr (1782–1842), member of the U.S. House of Representatives
- John Kerr Jr. (1811–1879), congressional representative and jurist
- John H. Kerr (1873–1958), jurist and politician
- Benjamin J. Lea (1833–1894), lawyer and politician who served as a justice on the Tennessee Supreme Court
- Jacob E. Long (1880–1955), 15th lieutenant governor of North Carolina from 1925 to 1929
- Giles Mebane (1809–1899), speaker of the North Carolina Senate during most of the Civil War
- Anderson Mitchell (1800–1876), U.S. representative
- Archibald Debow Murphey (1777–1832), attorney, jurist, and politician, known as North Carolina's "Father of Education"
- Romulus Mitchell Saunders (1791–1867), U.S. representative
- John W. Stephens (1834–1870), North Carolina state senator, agent for the Freedmen's Bureau
- Jacob Thompson (1810–1885), U.S. secretary of the interior
- Hugh Webster (1943–2022), register of deeds for Alamance County and North Carolina state senator
- Marmaduke Williams (1774–1850), Democratic-Republican U.S. congressman
- George “Royal George” Williamson (1788–1856), member of the North Carolina Senate
- Elijah Benton Withers (1836–1898), member of the North Carolina House of Representatives
- Eugene Withers (1867–1925), lawyer and politician
- Bartlett Yancey (1785–1828), Democrat-Republican U.S. congressman

=== Miscellaneous ===
- Jasper Brown (1918–1997), civil rights activist and farmer
- Oscar Penn Fitzgerald (1829–1911), Methodist clergyman, journalist, and educator
- Henrietta Phelps Jeffries (1857–1926), African American midwife, founding member of Milton's Macedonia AME Church
- Peter U. Murphey (1810–1876), naval officer and captain of the CSS Selma during the Civil War
- Jourdan Saunders (1796–1875), domestic slave trader and farmer

== See also ==
- Haw River Valley AVA, wine region partially located in the county
- List of counties in North Carolina
- Mack Ingram case, a 1951 false attempted rape accusation and conviction based on "leering"
- National Register of Historic Places listings in Caswell County, North Carolina
- Occaneechi Band of the Saponi Nation, state-recognized tribe that resides in the county
- Virginia International Raceway, a nearby multi-purpose road course offering auto and motorcycle racing

== Works cited ==
- Ashe, Samuel A'Court (1925). History of North Carolina. Vol. II. Raleigh: Edwards & Broughton. OCLC 244120893.
- Brisson, Jim D. (April 2011). "'Civil Government Was Crumbling Around Me': The Kirk-Holden War of 1870". The North Carolina Historical Review. 8 (2): 123–163. JSTOR 23523540.
- Brown, Deborah F. (2004). Dead-End Road. AuthorHouse. ISBN 9781418427832.
- Corbitt, David Leroy (2000). The formation of the North Carolina counties, 1663-1943 (reprint ed.). Raleigh: North Carolina Division of Archives and History. OCLC 46398241.
- Powell, William S. (1976). The North Carolina Gazetteer: A Dictionary of Tar Heel Places. Chapel Hill: The University of North Carolina Press. ISBN 9780807812471.
- Powell, William S. (1977). When the Past Refused to Die: A History of Caswell County, North Carolina, 1777-1977. Durham, NC: Moore Pub. Co.
- Sartin, Ruby Pearl (1972). Caswell County: The First Century, 1777–1787. Greensboro: The University of North Carolina at Greensboro (UNCG): College Collection.
- Walker, E.V. (1993). Caswell County Training School, 1933–1969: Relationships between Community and School. Harvard Educational Review, 63, 161–183.
- Walker, Vanessa Siddle (1996). Their Highest Potential: An African American School Community in the Segregated South. Chapel Hill: University of North Carolina Press.
