= Cherry Grove, Caswell County, North Carolina =

Cherry Grove
- Unincorporated community
- Location within the state of North Carolina
- Coordinates: 36°18′25″N 79°27′34″W
- Country: United States
- State: North Carolina
- County: Caswell
- Time zone: UTC-5 (Eastern (EST))
  - Summer (DST): UTC-4 (EDT)
- GNIS feature ID: 1019615

Cherry Grove is an unincorporated community in southwestern Caswell County, North Carolina, United States, east of Camp Springs, and west of Milesville.
