= Pelham, North Carolina =

- Unincorporated community
- Location within the state of North Carolina
- Coordinates: 36°30′37″N 79°28′18″W
- Country: United States
- State: North Carolina
- County: Caswell
- Time zone: UTC-5 (Eastern (EST))
  - Summer (DST): UTC-4 (EDT)
- ZIP code: 27311

Pelham is an unincorporated community in northwestern Caswell County, North Carolina at the North Carolina–Virginia border. Pelham is located along Pelham Loop Road near the eastern terminus of NC 700 at US 29 (future Interstate 785).

The community was named in honor of Confederate Col. John Pelham, known as "the Gallant Pelham" for his notable bravery. His parents, Dr. Atkinson and Martha Pelham (née McGehee), had previously resided in neighboring Person County before relocating to Alabama, where he was born.

Nearby communities, independent cities, and municipalities include Danville, Eden, Ruffin, Yanceyville, Purley, Reidsville and Casville.
