= Fitch, North Carolina =

- Unincorporated community
- Location of Fitch in North Carolina. Fitch (the United States)
- Coordinates: 36°19′25″N 79°21′42″W
- Country: United States
- State: North Carolina
- County: Caswell
- Elevation: 676 ft (206 m)
- Time zone: UTC-5 (Eastern (EST))
  - Summer (DST): UTC-4 (EDT)
- Area code: 336
- GNIS feature ID: 1020258

Fitch is an unincorporated community in Caswell County, North Carolina, United States. It is located north of Jericho.
