= Benjamin Forrest Williams =

American painter and museum curator

- Born: Benjamin Forrest Williams; December 24, 1925; Lumberton, North Carolina, U.S.
- Died: November 24, 2017 (aged 91); Chapel Hill, North Carolina, U.S.
- Education: Corcoran School of the Arts and Design; Black Mountain College; University of North Carolina at Chapel Hill
- Known for: Painting, curatorial work
- Notable work: Geanie (c. 1947), North Carolina Museum of Art
- Spouse: Margaret Click (m. 1955–2017)

Benjamin Forrest Williams (December 24, 1925 – November 24, 2017), also known as Ben Williams, was an American painter and art curator. He served as curator of the North Carolina Museum of Art (NCMA) from 1956 to 1979 and later as North Carolina State University’s first university art curator, helping establish the collection that became the Gregg Museum of Art & Design. His work Geanie (c. 1947) is in the NCMA’s collection, and he received a Raleigh Medal of Honor for the Arts in 1989.

== Early life and education ==
Williams was born in Lumberton, North Carolina on December 24, 1925, to Benjamin Forrest Williams Sr. and Mamie Britt Williams. He studied at the Corcoran School of Art in Washington, D.C., attended Black Mountain College, and earned a degree in art history from the University of North Carolina at Chapel Hill in 1949. Following his graduation, he traveled to France that same year with the intention of studying under Henri Matisse, though he ultimately only met with the elderly artist twice due to Matisse's failing health.

== Career ==
Williams returned to North Carolina in 1949 to join the North Carolina Museum of Art. He was appointed curator in 1956 and served until 1979; local reporting has described him as the museum’s first chief curator during this period.

In 1979, North Carolina State University hired Williams as its first university art curator. He identified and cataloged hundreds of works on campus, establishing the institution’s initial art collection and laying groundwork for what became the Gregg Museum of Art & Design. He also helped start the Friends of the College series, led an art critique group for more than 30 years, and worked to document and preserve North Carolina’s arts and architecture, including Jugtown Pottery and the legacy of Black Mountain College.

Alongside his curatorial work, Williams painted throughout his life. His oil-on-canvas Geanie (mid‑20th century) was shown at the "North Carolina Artists' Eleventh Annual Exhibition" (1947–48) and was purchased for the State Art Gallery/NCMA collection in 1947.

== Personal life ==
Williams married Margaret Click in 1955, and the couple remained together for 62 years. They restored and later made their home at Clarendon Hall in Yanceyville, North Carolina.

Williams died in Chapel Hill on November 24, 2017, at the age of 91. A celebration of life was held at the Gregg Museum in Raleigh on January 14, 2018.

== Selected work in public collections ==
- Geanie, mid‑20th century, oil on canvas, North Carolina Museum of Art, Raleigh, North Carolina.
