= Ruffin, North Carolina =

Unincorporated community in North Carolina, U.S.

Coordinates: 36°26′49″N 79°32′38″W

Ruffin
- Unincorporated community
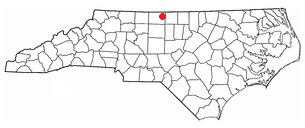
- Location within the U.S. state of North Carolina
- Interactive map of Ruffin
- Country: United States
- State: North Carolina
- County: Rockingham
- Named for: Thomas Ruffin

Population
  - Estimate (2023): 501
- Time zone: UTC-5 (Eastern)
  - Summer (DST): UTC-4 (EDT)
- ZIP Code: 27326
- Area codes: 336, 743

Ruffin is an unincorporated community located in Rockingham County, North Carolina, United States.

In 2023, the population estimate was 501.

== Geography ==
Ruffin is located northeast of Reidsville, North Carolina, and southwest of Danville, Virginia, near US 29 (future Interstate 785).

Neighboring communities and municipalities include Reidsville, Eden, Pelham, Casville, and Wentworth.

The ZIP Code for Ruffin is 27326.

== History ==
With the completion of the Piedmont Railroad by the Confederate Government in 1864, the village of Ruffin experienced steady growth. Subsequently, Ruffin became an important center of trade for both Rockingham and Caswell counties. Yet, substantial growth and commerce were to elude Ruffin. Instead, the prosperity found a home in the nearby community of Reidsville. There is speculation that growth in Ruffin was doomed because the local landowners wanted the community to remain rural and undeveloped. Consequently, a booming town could not materialize.

Ruffin is home to the first established volunteer fire department within Rockingham County. Residents produce tobacco, vegetables and strawberries. Previously, the area also had a gold mine. Churches in the community include Ruffin United Methodist Church, Ruffin-Stacey Baptist Church, and Mt. Hermon Missionary Baptist Church established 1886.

== Incorporation (1887-1897) ==
From 1887 to 1897, Ruffin was incorporated with its own mayor. The last mayor of Ruffin was Victor M. Holderby, who was an active member of the Ruffin Methodist Episcopal Church.

== Namesake ==
The community is named after Thomas Ruffin (1787–1870) an American jurist and Justice of the North Carolina Supreme Court from 1829 to 1852 and again from 1858 to 1859. He was Chief Justice of that Court from 1833 to 1852. He lived in the community for a short while.

== Climate ==
Winter in Ruffin is cool and wet. The average high temperature in January is 47 °F (8 °C).

Summer in Ruffin is hot and humid. The average high temperature in July is 88 °F (31 °C).

== 2018 tornado ==
On April 15, 2018, Ruffin was struck by an EF1 tornado. The tornado was part of a larger outbreak across the southeastern United States.
