= Henrietta Phelps Jeffries =

American midwife

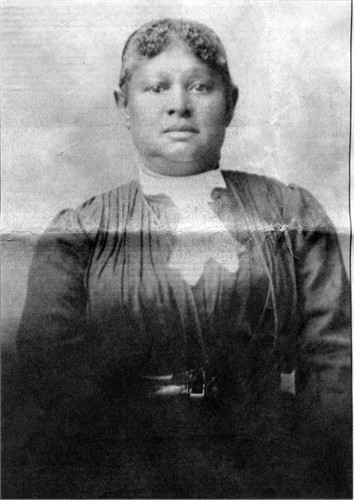
- Born: Henrietta Phelps; January 5, 1857; Halifax County, Virginia, United States
- Died: August 22, 1926; Milton, Caswell County, North Carolina, United States
- Occupation: Midwife

Henrietta Phelps Jeffries (January 5, 1857 – August 22, 1926) was an African American midwife and a founding member of the Macedonia A.M.E. Church located in Milton, North Carolina.

== Biography ==
Henrietta Phelps was born on January 5, 1857, in Pittsylvania County, Virginia, the daughter of enslaved African Americans, Elija Phelps (~1825-~1875), a farmer, and Charlotte Ann Bennett/Shelton (~1826-~1905), a midwife. She was the eldest daughter in a family of nine children. Henrietta lived with her parents until her first marriage to George Lawson of Milton, North Carolina, on January 21, 1872, at the age of 15. The marriage produced a son, George Jr., but Henrietta was widowed by the age of 22. Henrietta subsequently married James Allen Jeffress, a tobacco farmer, in Milton, Caswell County, on July 30, 1881. Henrietta and Allen had 11 children together. The family resided in Milton, North Carolina.

Henrietta was literate and identified her occupation as "doctress" in the 1910 U.S. Census, where she worked throughout Caswell County as a midwife. She is recorded as having delivered "hundreds of children, both black and white" throughout the county and neighboring areas. It appears that Henrietta learned midwifery from her mother.

Henrietta Phelps Lawson Jeffries died of chronic nephritis on August 22, 1926. She is buried at Macedonia A.M.E. Church on Yarborough Road in Milton, North Carolina.

== Surname ==
In African American genealogy research for Caswell County, North Carolina, the surname Jeffries appears in several variations, including Jeffers, Jefferies, Jeffreys, Jeffres, and Jeffress. These spelling differences often reflect distinct family branches. The most frequently used forms in census, birth, and death records related to Henrietta and Allen Jeffries are Jeffress or Jeffres. Nonetheless, Jeffries remains the most commonly used spelling in historical documents, publications, and artifacts.

== Legacy ==
As recently as 2025, some of Henrietta Jeffries' descendants continue to live in Milton and Yanceyville, North Carolina. Also, a few of her sons moved to cities such as Pittsburgh, PA, Philadelphia, PA, Baltimore, MD, and Washington, DC, during the Great Northern Migration that occurred from 1910 to 1970 when a large population of African Americans left the American South to other regions of the United States for sociocultural, educational, and economic opportunities. Thus, today, many of Henrietta Jeffries' descendants live throughout the Eastern region of the United States.

In 1985, Henrietta Jeffries was listed as one of the "First Ladies of Caswell County, Past and Present."

In 2002, Piedmont Community College produced and released a documentary film, "The Trial of Henrietta Jeffries," which provides details of her life. Many of Jeffries's descendants performed in the movie.

In 2025, Henrietta Jeffries was an honoree on a mural of notable historical figures called "Before Us," dedicated to the town of Yanceyville, NC, by the Caswell County's Council of the Arts.

== Trial ==
Henrietta was brought to trial on charges of "practicing medicine without a license" in 1912.

Jeffries' trial took place on April 15, 1913, and was a historic event for the small town of Milton, North Carolina, as it garnered national attention in the press of that era. The trial was held at the courthouse in neighboring Yanceyville where the jury consisted of all white men. The judge heard Henrietta defend herself without legal representation, relying on her Christian faith. The judge then stepped down from the bench, stood beside Mrs. Jeffries, defended her cause, and, as judge, overrode the jury's decision and dismissed the charges. Such a dismissal was unprecedented for an American woman of color during the early 20th century. Henrietta Jeffries continued her work as a midwife until she died in 1926.

The trial is recorded in William S. Powell's book, When the Past Refused to Die: A History of Caswell County, North Carolina, 1777–1977.

== Legacy ==
The trial of Henrietta Jeffries was made into a reenactment film titled The Trial of Henrietta Jeffries. Produced by Piedmont Community College in Roxboro, North Carolina, in 2002, the film features many of Henrietta Jeffries' descendants as characters.

On August 22, 2018, WRAL-TV News (Raleigh, NC) aired a segment about Henrietta Jeffries' life as part of reporter Scott Mason's series Tar Heel Traveler. The segment was titled "Midwife Delivered Hundreds of Babies Despite Bigotry."
