= Conservators Center, Burlington =

Coordinates: 36.256°N 79.311°W

The Animal Park at the Conservators Center is an 18-hectare (45-acre) zoological park located in Burlington and Caswell County, North Carolina, United States. Founded in 1999, the Center opened to visitors in 2007 via reservations only, and attracts approximately 16,000 visitors per year.

== Overview ==
The Animal Park at the Conservators Center is a 501(c)(3) non-profit organization. The Park does not receive taxpayer funding for operating services, and relies on funding through their tour services, memberships, donations, grants, events, and corporate contributions. Their core mission is to "educate people, care for animals, and advocate for species." They offer a variety of adventure and family-friendly tours and even special seasonal tours and events.

The Animal Park at the Conservators Center was founded in 1999 by skilled exotic animal professionals, Mindy Stinner and Douglas Evans. Beginning as a smaller facility, managing around 25 small exotic species and 3 tigers, they expanded when an Ohio facility was closed in 2004. The government reached out to the Center and other facilities to help take on a large group of confiscated animals, including big cats. The Center agreed to take 3, and another facility agreed to take on 11. However, the other facility was unable to provide those 11 cats a new home within a timely manner, and therefore all 14 became new residents of the Conservators Center. This was a huge turning point for this small facility in North Carolina. The 14 large cats arrived, and 4 females were pregnant. Within a few months of arrival, 15 new tiger and lion cubs were born.

The Center opened their doors to visitors in 2007 to help generate support for the increased animal population. Guided educational tours began in September 2007, and most of the original tour guides are still working and volunteering at the facility as of 2020.

In October 2019 the Conservators Center was rebranded as The Animal Park at the Conservators Center.

On December 30, 2018, a lion killed a college intern who was working there. The Center issued statements in response to press inquiries. There have been no other serious incidents reported since they opened in 1999.
