= Casville, North Carolina =

- Unincorporated community
- Location within the state of North Carolina
- Coordinates: 36°23′24″N 79°30′15″W
- Country: United States
- State: North Carolina
- County: Caswell
- Time zone: UTC-5 (Eastern (EST))
  - Summer (DST): UTC-4 (EDT)

Casville is an unincorporated community in Caswell County, North Carolina, United States. It is located at the crossroads of U.S. Route 158 and Ashland Rd/Park Springs Rd.

Travelers along US 158 notice a significant change in the speed limit from 55 mph (89 km/h) to 25 mph (40.2 km/h) as they approach the community's only caution traffic signal; the speed limit returns to 55 mph (89 km/h) after leaving the crossroads area.

Casville has two gas stations for those traveling along US 158 between Yanceyville, North Carolina and Reidsville, North Carolina. In the 2000s, it had a convenience store called the Casville Food Mart.

It has a volunteer fire department. As of 1996, the Casville fire department was the only volunteer fire department in Caswell County to receive funding from a fire tax levied on residents within its service district.

Neighboring communities include Pelham and Ruffin.
