= Wilson Carey =

North Carolina reconstruction era American politician

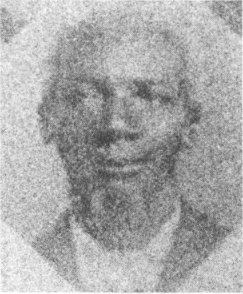
- Wilson Carey (Circa 1889)

Member of the North Carolina House of Representatives
- In office 1868–1870
- In office 1874–1880
- In office 1889–1889

Personal details
- Born: 1830s Amelia County, Virginia
- Party: Republican

Wilson Carey (August 1, 1831 – c. 1905) was a farmer and Reconstruction era politician in North Carolina serving in the North Carolina House of Representatives.

== Biography ==
Carey was born in the 1830s (with different sources giving 1830, August 1, 1831 or 1834/5) in Amelia County, Virginia and was educated in Richmond before moving to North Carolina in 1855. He married Frances Kimbrough in 1857 and together they had 15 children, but only eight survived to adulthood.

He was a representative for Caswell County in both the 1868 and 1875 constitutional conventions. In the first of these he spoke against the proposal to increase white immigration saying: "The Negro planted this wilderness, built up the State to where it was; therefore, if anything was to be given, the Negro was entitled to it".

He was originally a farmer, served as a magistrate and county commissioner. In 1869, he was North Carolina's first Black postmaster, but served for just three months resigning probably to avoid issues with being a representative and postmaster at the same time.

Carey was first elected to the North Carolina House of Representatives in 1868 serving until 1870.

It was claimed by governor William Woods Holden, after the murder of John W. Stephens, that Carey was driven from the county. However, the following day Carey had written to Holden with no mention of such an event. He was also elected in 1870 to serve in the North Carolina Senate for the 24th district in the next session, but did not take his seat. New elections were called at the start of 1871 due to the "military occupation by Kirk's thieves", in reference to George Washington Kirk and the Kirk–Holden war, and the seat went to Livingston Brown.

He served again in the North Carolina House of Representatives from 1874 until 1880 winning re-election in 1876 and 1878, and finally was elected for a final term in 1889.

Carey moved to Washington, D.C. sometime before 1900 with his family where he lived at least until 1905.

== See also ==
- African American officeholders from the end of the Civil War until before 1900
