= Jericho, North Carolina =

- Unincorporated community
- Location of Jericho in North Carolina Jericho (the United States)
- Coordinates: 36°17′13″N 79°21′59″W
- Country: United States
- State: North Carolina
- County: Caswell
- Elevation: 712 ft (217 m)
- Time zone: UTC-5 (Eastern (EST))
  - Summer (DST): UTC-4 (EDT)
- Area code: 336
- GNIS feature ID: 987569

Jericho is an unincorporated community in Caswell County, North Carolina, United States. It is located south-southwest of Yanceyville, and south of Fitch.
