= Milesville, North Carolina =

Unincorporated community in North Carolina, US

Coordinates: 36.308502°N 79.415565°W

Milesville is an unincorporated community in southwestern Caswell County, North Carolina, United States, located east of Cherry Grove.
