= Providence, Caswell County, North Carolina =

Providence, North Carolina
- Unincorporated community
- Location within North Carolina Location within the United States
- Coordinates: 36°30′19″N 79°22′13″W
- Country: United States
- State: North Carolina
- County: Caswell
- Elevation: 554 ft (169 m)
- Time zone: UTC-5 (Eastern (EST))
  - Summer (DST): UTC-4 (EDT)
- ZIP code: 27315
- Area code: 336
- GNIS feature ID: 1022094

Providence (formerly known as Hells Half Acre) is an unincorporated community in Caswell County, North Carolina, United States. Providence is 7 miles (11 km) north-northwest of Yanceyville and directly south of Danville, Virginia. Providence has a post office with ZIP code 27315.

The small town annually hosts the "Spring Fling", a two-day event held on a weekend in late April or early May on the grounds of the Providence Volunteer Fire Department. It features rides for kids, food, crafts, fireworks, and nationally known entertainment.

"The Gym", a full-size gymnasium originally built for the now defunct Piedmont Academy but now owned and maintained by Covenant Reformed Baptist Church, is generally available for public use. Every Sunday evening area youth gather for basketball games.
