= Camp Springs, North Carolina =

Unincorporated community in North Carolina, US

Coordinates: 36°17′46″N 79°29′30″W

Camp Springs is an unincorporated community in Caswell County, North Carolina. It lies at an elevation of 784 feet (239 m).

According to oral tradition, the area took its name because troops from Cornwallis' British army camped there in 1781.

On Boone Road in the southern part of Camp Springs, bluegrass promoter Carlton Haney (1928–2011) moved "The Original" Blue Grass Music Festival to property owned by his brother, Charles (died 2016). Named "Blue Grass Park," it was the site of some of the largest bluegrass festivals from then until 1977 on Labor Day (US) weekend as well as additional events including a spring New Grass Festival. Events continued there sporadically until the late 1990s.

The owner Carlton Haney moved a long time family-friend, Banjo Player Ronald Franklin Smith and his wife Peggy Kay Smith onto the property in the mid-1980s to keep the grounds functional year round. After the birth of Ronald Smith's son Levi Trail Smith in 1991, life spiraled out of control for Ronald and he and his family left the grounds in 1997.

The property fell into disarray after the Smith family departed the grounds. Despite considerable deterioration of the condition of Blue Grass Park, the basic features remained visible in 2015.
