= Gregg Museum of Art & Design =

The Gregg Museum of Art & Design
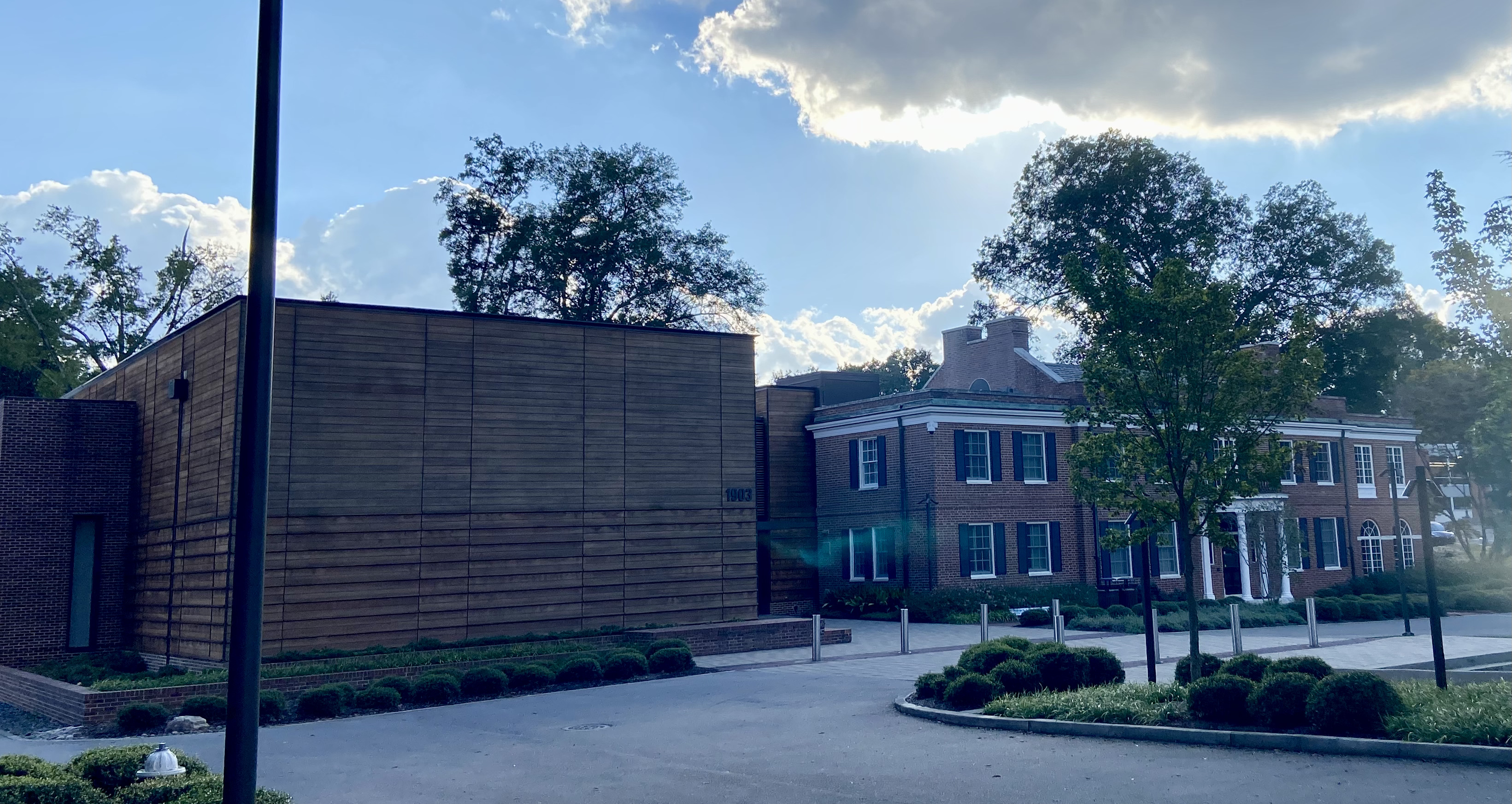
- The Gregg Museum
- Established: 1979
- Location: 1903 Hillsborough Street Raleigh, NC 27607
- Coordinates: 35°47′7.8″N 78°39′40.6584″W
- Type: Art Museum
- Director: Roger Manley
- Website: gregg.arts.ncsu.edu

The Gregg Museum of Art & Design is the art museum of North Carolina State University and is located near NC State's main campus in Raleigh, North Carolina. To current NC State chancellor Randy Woodson, the Gregg is "an opportunity to not only celebrate the arts and design at NC State, but to welcome the community onto our campus in a new way." The Gregg holds exhibitions, lectures, workshops, film screenings, and other educational activities; admission to the Gregg is free.

== History ==
=== Becoming the Gregg ===
The Gregg began in the 1930s as an informal university art collection, mostly composed of donations. Chancellor John Tyler Caldwell and School of Design Dean Henry L. Kamphoefner expanded the collection in the 60s, seeking to acquire and exhibit art which would reflect and enrich the teachings of the university. The collection was first catalogued in the 70s, and became known as the Visual Arts Program. The program was housed in its own space and became the Visual Arts Center (later renamed the Gallery of Art & Design) when an addition, built to house up to 5,000 objects, was added to the Talley Student Union in 1992. It went through the last name change in 2007 when it was renamed the Gregg Museum of Art & Design in honor of Nancy and John Gregg.

=== Relocation ===
In 2009, the university announced the Talley Student Union would undergo a $120 million renovation and expansion project, and the redesign would not include the Gregg. During its time on the second and third floor of Talley Student Union, the Gregg’s collection had grown from 1,500 to over 27,000 objects. In addition to the issue of limited space, the Gregg’s location made it difficult for off-campus visitors to visit the museum. In considering the difficulties which the Gregg experienced as a result of being located on campus, the university decided it was time for the museum to get a standalone location. In May 2013 the Gregg moved to a temporary location while it waited for its new home to be built.

=== Renovation ===
The Historic Chancellor’s Residence was built in 1928 by Hobart Upjohn. In 2011, The Freelon Group of Durham, headed by architect Philip Freelon, was selected to lead the renovation project. Perkins and Will, a global architecture firm based out of Chicago, acquired The Freelon Group (and the renovation project) in 2014. The university would not begin renovating until they secured complete funding, which took approximately 4 years; in April 2015, a groundbreaking ceremony was held to signify the start of construction. The approximately 9.5 million dollar project was funded through the university's Talley Student Center renovation fund, donations from alumni and community members, funding from the city of Raleigh, and funding from Wake County.

=== Reopening ===
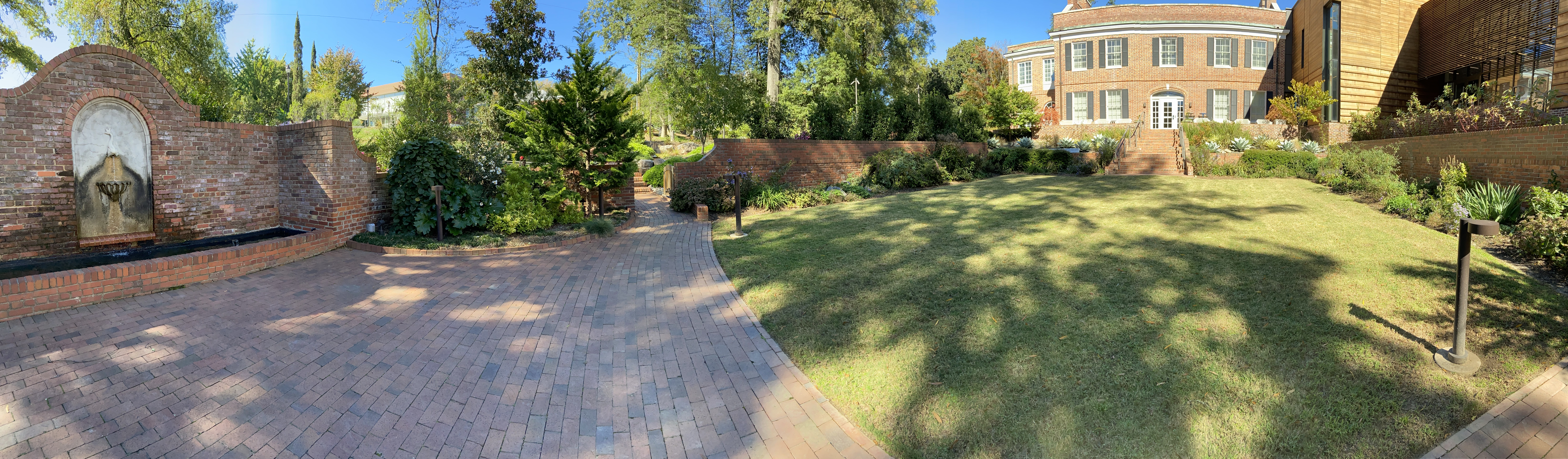
The Pollinator Garden

The Gregg reopened its new location in August 2017. The 24,000 square foot building is LEED certified and includes ample gallery space, offices, a classroom, and storage space for the permanent collection. The museum grounds include a sculpture garden (still in progress) and the Pollinator Garden, a garden designed by NC State associate professor, Anne Spafford, and her horticulture students.

== Permanent Collection ==
The museum’s permanent collection includes textiles, ceramics, photography, design and decorative arts, folk art, outsider art and Native American art. The collection currently contains over 35,000 catalogued items. Staff are inventorying the holdings now and anticipate this number will increase once the survey is complete.
