= Calvin Graves =

American politician (1804–1877)

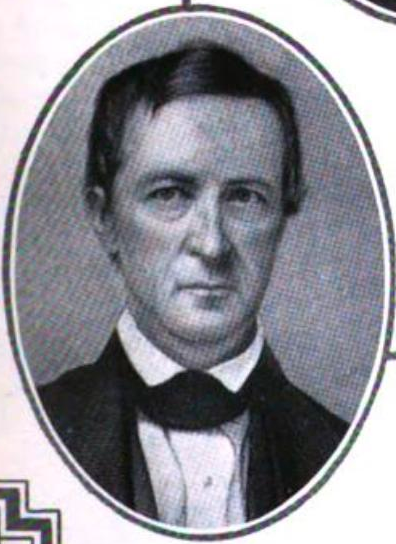
Calvin Graves

Calvin Graves (January 3, 1804 – February 11, 1877) was an American politician. He was a house member of the North Carolina House of Commons and a member of the North Carolina State Senate. He was the son of Azariah Graves.

Graves studied at the Bingham School, University of North Carolina, and with Leonard Henderson, before establishing a law practice in Yanceyville, and entering politics as a delegate from Caswell County to the 1835 state constitutional convention.

He supported railway expansion and the North Carolina Railroad, supported the establishment of an insane asylum, and was a trustee at Wake Forest University. He opposed voting rights for African Americans. His vote for a railroad as Senate president broke a tie.

He and his wife had two sons and two daughters. A historical marker is at the site of his birthplace.
