= Azariah Graves =

American politician

Azariah Graves (October 29, 1768 – March 1, 1850) was a general in the North Carolina militia during the War of 1812 and a state senator for seven terms. Calvin Graves was his son. He married Elizabeth William June 3, 1790. He was a sheriff in Caswell County.
