= William S. Powell =

American historian (1919–2015)

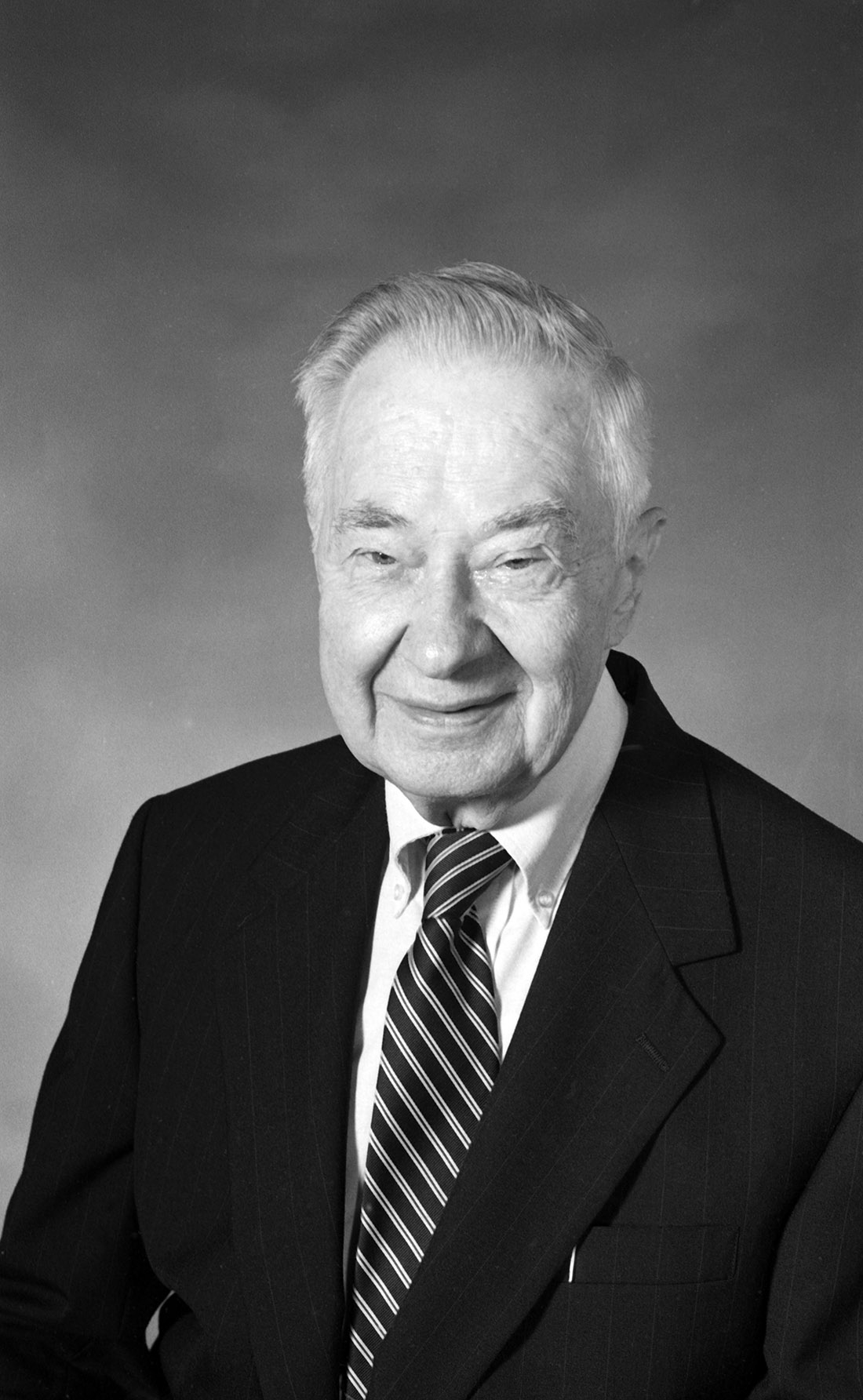
- Powell in 2000
- Born: William Stevens Powell; April 28, 1919; Johnston County, North Carolina
- Died: April 10, 2015; Chapel Hill, North Carolina
- Education: University of North Carolina at Chapel Hill
- Known for: North Carolina historian, author, teacher, and librarian
- Spouse: Virginia Penn Waldrop

William Stevens Powell (April 28, 1919 – April 10, 2015) was an American historian, writer, academic, and teacher. He authored over 600 articles and books about the history of North Carolina and was the editor of the six volume Dictionary of North Carolina Biography. He was professor emeritus of history at the University of North Carolina at Chapel Hill, having retired in 1986.

== Early life ==
William was born on April 28, 1919 in Johnston County, North Carolina in a house built by his great-grandfather along the Neuse River between Smithfield and Goldsboro. He was the son of Isaac Millard Powell (1892-1955) and Ada Belle Perry Powell (1895-1982). In 1920, his family moved to Statesville, North Carolina where his father gained employment with the State Highway and Public Works Commission. His mother was employed as a school teacher in Iredell County. William finished high school in Statesville and attended Mitchell College in Statesville for two years and then transferred to the University of North Carolina at Chapel Hill. He earned a bachelor's degree in history in 1940.

== Career ==
After college William worked briefly for the Statesville Record and began writing his first articles about North Carolina history for the Our State magazine. When World War II started, he enlisted in the U.S. Army and was stationed at Fort Knox, Kentucky and served overseas in the Philippines and Japan. After the war, he returned to Statesville and worked briefly at the Statesville Landmark & Record before enrolling at the University of North Carolina, where he received a degree in library science in 1947. After graduation, he worked briefly as a librarian at Yale University in the Rare Book Room before returning to North Carolina to take a job in Raleigh, North Carolina at the North Carolina Division of Archives and History. His job was to write text for the North Carolina historical markers. In Raleigh he met Virginia Penn Waldrop, whom he married in 1952. Virginia would also become his valued research assistant in his historical research.

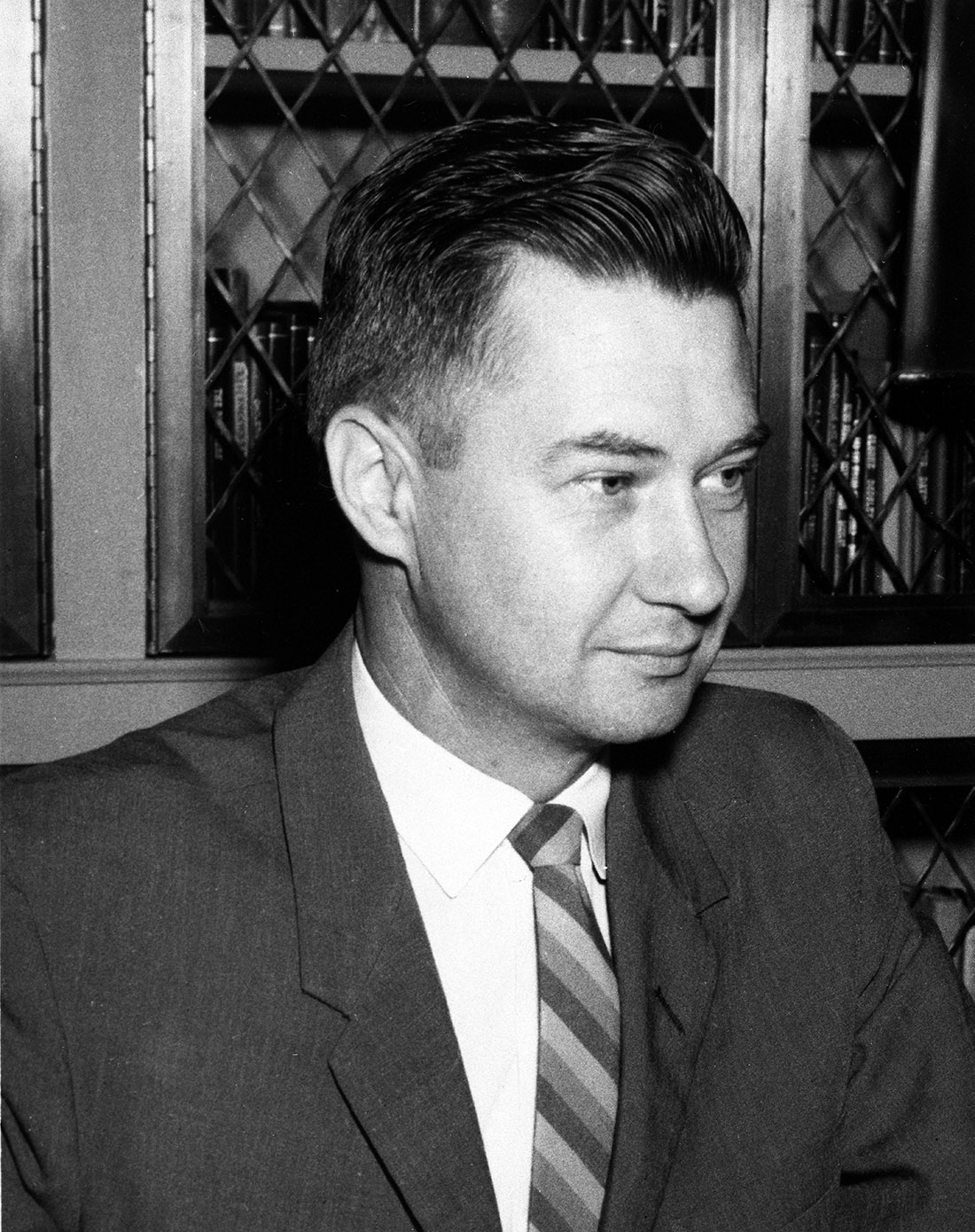
William S. Powell, 1970

In 1951, he began working as a librarian at the University of North Carolina in the library's North Carolina Collection, where he became curator of the collection in 1958. He made a major effort to expand the collection of historic documents about North Carolina and the people of North Carolina.

Early in his professional career, he focused on the colonial and early history of North Carolina. In 1956, Powell received a Guggenheim Fellowship to study U.S. history. During this fellowship, he traveled to England and conducted research on the Roanoke Colony in colonial North Carolina.

In 1972, he left this position and to become a professor of North Carolina history at the University of North Carolina at Chapel Hill. He remained in this position until 1986 when he retired to devote more time to research and writing. During his teaching career, he taught over 6,000 students.

== Awards and works ==
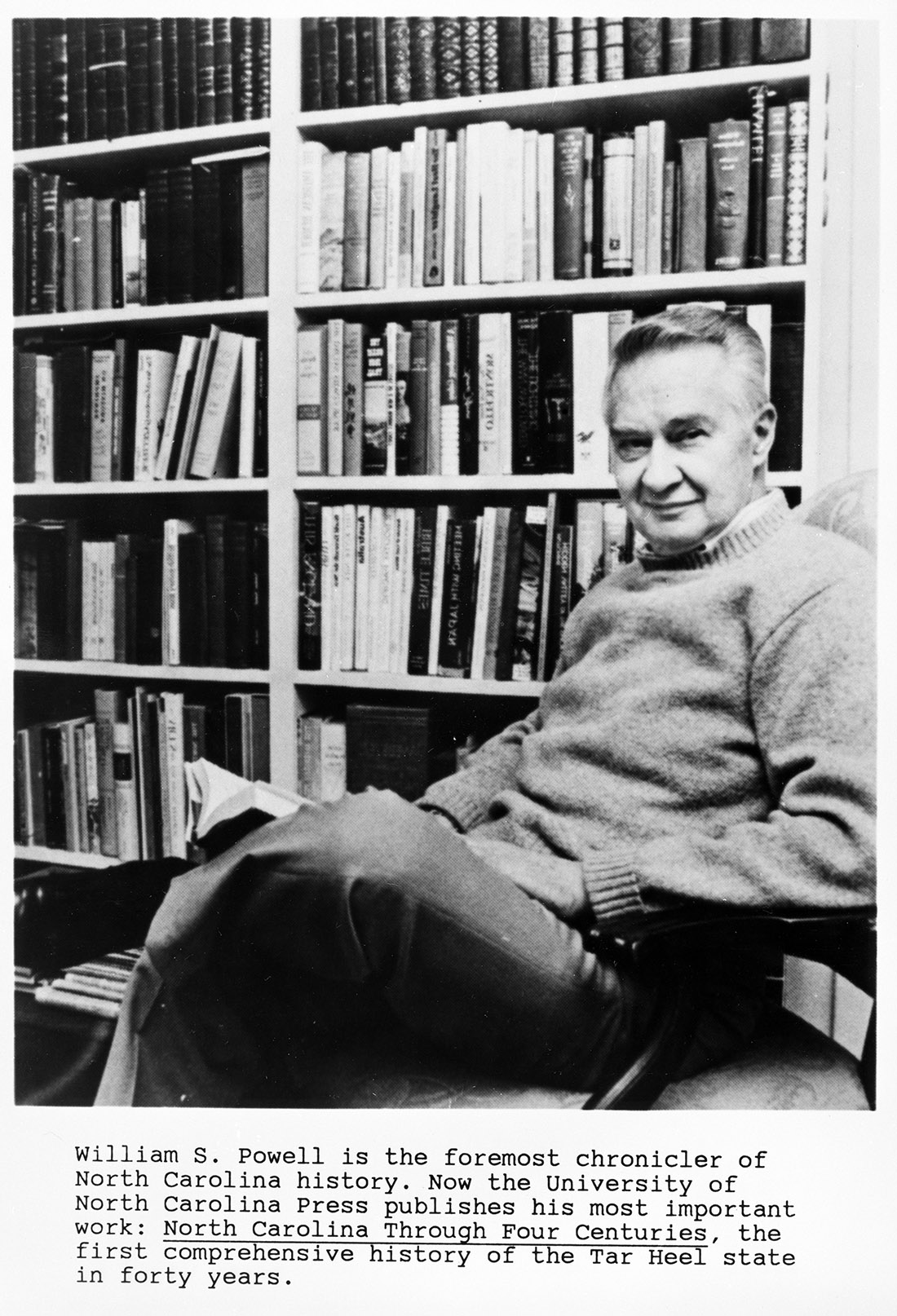
William S. Powell, 1980s

He received the North Carolina Award for literature in 2000 and was inducted into the North Carolina Literary Hall of Fame in 2008. He won the Mayflower Cup for Nonfiction in 1989 for his book, North Carolina Through Four Centuries.

He inspired others to contribute to the books that he edited, such as the Dictionary of North Carolina biography, and also contributed many of the articles. He authored over 600 articles and books in his career. His works included:

- William S. Powell (1968). The Proprietors of Carolina. State Department of Archives and History.
- William S. Powell (1969). The North Carolina Colony. Forge of Freed Books.
- Hugh T. Lefler, William S. Powell (1973). Colonial North Carolina: A History. Kraus International Publications.
- William S. Powell (1976). The War of the Regulation and the Battle of Alamance, May 16, 1771. Division of Archives and History, N.C. Department of Cultural Resources.
- William S. Powell (1988). North Carolina: A History. University of North Carolina Press.
- William S. Powell (1989). North Carolina through Four Centuries. University of North Carolina Press. ISBN 9780807898987.
- William Stevens Powell (1992). The First State University: A Pictorial History of the University of North Carolina. University of North Carolina Press. ISBN 9780807820490.
- William S. Powell (1993). North Carolina: A Proud State in Our Nation. D.C. Heath.
- William Stevens Powell, ed. (1996). Dictionary of North Carolina Biography. Chapel Hill: University of North Carolina Press.: Volume 1, A-C (1979), Volume 2, D-G (1986), Volume 3, H-K (1988), Volume 4, L-O (1991), Volume 5, P-S (1994), Volume 6, T-Z (1996)
- William Stevens Powell, Jay Mazzocchi (2006). Encyclopedia of North Carolina. University of North Carolina Press.
- William S. Powell and Michael Hill, ed. (2010). North Carolina Gazetteer, A Dictionary of Tar Heel Places and Their History. University of North Carolina Press.

== Death and family ==
Powell died on April 10, 2015, aged 95. He was survived by his wife, Virginia. He had three children and 11 grandchildren.
