= Blanch, North Carolina =

- Unincorporated community
- Location within the state of North Carolina
- Coordinates: 36°30′29″N 79°17′42″W
- Country: United States
- State: North Carolina
- County: Caswell
- Elevation: 387 ft (118 m)
- Time zone: UTC-5 (Eastern (EST))
  - Summer (DST): UTC-4 (EDT)
- ZIP code: 27212
- Area codes: 336 and 743
- GNIS feature ID: 981582

Blanch (formerly, Blanche) is an unincorporated community in Dan River Township, Caswell County, North Carolina, between North Carolina Highway 86, and North Carolina Highway 62, at an elevation of 387 feet (118 m).
