= Training school (United States) =

Segregated schools for African Americans

A training school, or county training school, was a type of segregated school for African American students found in the United States and Canada. In the Southern United States they were established to educate African Americans at elementary and secondary levels, especially as teachers; and in the Northern United States they existed as educational reformatory schools. A few training schools still exist, however they exist in a different context.

== History ==
Map showing the divide between northern states and southern states after the American Civil War (blue is north, red is south)

The training school movement began in 1911. The southern training schools were supported by northern philanthropists, roughly from 1910 to 1930. The Slater Fund supported many of the schools. Philanthropic organizations had their own criteria for funding support.

In the segregated Jim Crow South (roughly until the 1950s), schools for African Americans could not be high schools so they were called training schools and “emphasized vocational training and domestic science over academic subjects”. In the south they often served African American students from a large area and were often named county training schools. County training schools were established in Alabama starting in 1915. Training schools addressed the need for larger and better schools to supplement elementary education in small rural schools and helped meet the demand for teachers. They had an agricultural and industrial training ethos and required support and cooperation from local officials. Many schools were eventually renamed, and became high schools until desegregation when many were closed.

Training schools were also established in northern states and in Canada as educational reformatory schools.

== List of U.S. training schools ==
Listed by southern or northern status, by state, and in alphabetical order by name

=== Northern states ===
==== Connecticut ====
- Mansfield Training School and Hospital in Mansfield, Connecticut
- Southbury Training School in Southbury, Connecticut and Roxbury, Connecticut

==== Iowa ====
- Girls State Training School in Toledo, Iowa

==== Ohio ====
- Hillcrest Training School in Cincinnati, Ohio; an extant reform school

==== Massachusetts ====
- Hampden County Training School in Agawam, Massachusetts; established in 1916, a reformatory school for boys
- Middlesex County Training School in North Chelmsford, Massachusetts; a reform school

==== Michigan ====
- Wayne County Training School in Wayne County, Michigan

==== New Jersey ====
- Vineland Training School in Vineland, New Jersey; first U.S. research facility devoted to studying mental deficiencies was established

==== North Dakota ====
- State Training School in North Dakota; a reform school

=== Southern states ===
==== Alabama ====
- Bibb County Training School in Centreville, Alabama
- Chilton County Training School in Clanton, Alabama
- Escambia County Training School in Atmore, Alabama
- Lowndes County Training School in Hayneville, Alabama
- Mobile County Training School in Mobile, Alabama

==== Arkansas ====
- Chicot County Training School in Dermott, Arkansas
- Dallas County Training School in Fordyce, Arkansas; built in 1934 with the Rosenwald Fund, the only high school serving African Americans in a four southern Arkansas counties until 1940
- Fargo Training School in Fargo, Arkansas
- General Education Board Training School in Lafayette County, Arkansas
- Jefferson County Training School in Pine Bluff
- Lafayette County Training School in Stamps, Arkansas
- Little River County Training School in Ashdown, Arkansas

==== Florida ====
- Carver Training School in Martin County, Florida
- Dade County Training School in Dade County, Florida; from 1899–1937
- Delray County Training School in Delray Beach, Florida
- Jackson County Training School in Jackson County, Florida
- Lake County Training School in Leesburg, Florida
- Madison County Training School in Madison, Florida
- Murray Training School in Martin County, Florida
- Stuart Training School in Stuart, Martin County, Florida

==== Georgia ====
- Carroll County Training School in Carrollton, Georgia
- Fayette County Training School in Fayetteville, Georgia

==== Louisiana ====
- DeSoto Parish Training School in Mansfield, Louisiana; succeeded by DeSoto High School
- East Carroll Parish Training School in Lake Providence, Louisiana
- Holy Ghost Training School in Opelousas, Louisiana; succeeded by Holy Ghost High School
- Iberia Parish Training School in New Iberia, Louisiana
- Lafayette Parish Training School in Lafayette, Louisiana
- Natchitoches Parish Training School in Natchitoches, Louisiana
- St. Landry Parish Training School in Opelousas, Louisiana
- Tangipegoa Parish Training School in Kentwood, Louisiana
- Tenses Parish Training School in St. Joseph, Louisiana
- Webster Training School in Minden, Louisiana; succeeded by Webster High School

==== Mississippi ====
- Amite County Training School in Gloster, Mississippi
- Attala County Training School in Kosciusko, Mississippi
- Claiborne County Training School
- Columbia Training School
- Harrison County Training School in Pass Christian, Mississippi
- Holmes County Training School in Durant, Mississippi
- Leake County Training School in Leake County, Mississippi
- Lee County Training School in Tupelo, Mississippi; which became Carver High School (Tupelo, Mississippi)
- Lincoln County Training School
- Madison County Training School
- Madison County Training School
- Monroe County Training School in Amory, Mississippi
- Neshoba County Training School
- Noxubee County Training School in Shuqualak, Mississippi
- Oktibbeha County Training School in Starkville, Mississippi
- Pearl River County Training School in Picayune, Mississippi
- Pike County Training School in Magnolia, Mississippi
- Smith County Training School
- Stone County Training School in Wiggins, Mississippi; the first secondary school for Black students in Stone County, Mississippi
- Union County Training School in New Albany
- Walthall County Training School in Lexie, Walthall County, Mississippi
- Wilkinson County Training School
- Winston County Training School in Louisville, Mississippi
- Yazoo County Training School in Yazoo City, Mississippi; which became Yazoo City Training School and later N. D. Taylor High School

==== North Carolina ====
- Anderson County Training School in North Carolina
- Berry O’Kelly Training School in Method, North Carolina
- Bladen County Training School in Elizabethtown, North Carolina
- Buncombe County Boys' Training School in Asheville, North Carolina
- Caswell County Training School in Yanceyville, North Carolina; from 1934–1969
- Cleveland County Training School in Shelby, North Carolina; a Rosenwald School near Wise, North Carolina
- Franklin County Training School in Louisburg, North Carolina
- Harnett County Training School in Dunn, North Carolina
- Hyde County Training School in Sladesville, Hyde County, North Carolina
- Lee County Training School in Lee County, North Carolina
- Orange County Training School (OCTS) in Chapel Hill, North Carolina; from 1916–1966
- Stonewall Jackson Training School in unincorporated Cabarrus County, North Carolina
- Warren County Training School in Wise, Warren County, North Carolina; a Rosenwald School
- Wilmington Training School in Wilmington, North Carolina where Lewis Thomas Christmas served as principal

==== South Carolina ====
- Allendale Training School in Allendale, South Carolina serving Allendale County (NRHP listed)
- Clarendon County Training School
- Darlington County Training School in Hartsville, South Carolina that became H. H. Butler High School
- Laurens County Training School

==== Tennessee ====
- Bedford County Training School for Negroes in Shelbyville, Tennessee; also named John McAdams High School during its existence
- Chester County Training School in Henderson, Tennessee
- Fayette County Training School in Somerville
- Gibson County Training School in Milan, Tennessee; built in 1926 with financial support from the Rosenwald Fund
- Hardeman County Training School in Whiteville, Tennessee
- Haywood County Training School in Brownsville, Tennessee; which became George Washington Carver High School

==== Texas ====
- Sam Houston Industrial and Training School in rural Galilee, near Huntsville, Texas
- Texas State Training School for Girls in Cooke County, Texas

==== Virginia ====
- Albemarle Training School in Charlottesville, Virginia
- Augusta County Training School in Cedar Green, Virginia
- Buckingham Training School in Dillwyn, Virginia; a Rosenwald School
- Greensville County Training School in Emporia, Virginia
- Konnarock Training School in Konnarock, Virginia
- Nansemond County Training School in Suffolk, Virginia
- Princess Anne County Training School in Virginia Beach, Princess Anne County, Virginia

== Canada ==
- New Brunswick Training School a former youth detention centre in Kingsclear, New Brunswick, Canada

== See also ==
- History of African-American education, the history of early Black education in the United States
- General Education Board, a private organization to help support higher education and medical schools in the rural South
- Manual labor college (1825–1860), a type of school that supplemented academics with labor
- Normal school, an educational institution to train teachers
- Training school (United Kingdom)
- List of industrial schools
- List of institutions providing special education facilities
- Historically Black colleges and universities
- List of historically black colleges and universities
- Rosenwald Schools
- Jeanes Foundation
- List of former high schools in Louisiana
