= Jasper Brown =

African American farmer and civil rights activist

- Born: 1918
- Died: 1997 (aged 78–79)
- Occupation: Farmer
- Organization: NAACP (Caswell County branch)
- Known for: School desegregation activism in Caswell County, North Carolina; plaintiff in Jeffers v. Whitley; 1963 Caswell County school integration incident
- Movement: Civil rights movement
- Spouse: Odessa Brown
- Children: 4

Jasper Brown (1918–1997) was an African American farmer and civil rights activist from Caswell County, North Carolina. Local historical accounts describe him as a community leader who helped lead efforts to desegregate Caswell County's public schools in the 1950s and 1960s, working through the Caswell County branch of the NAACP and serving as a parent–plaintiff in the federal school desegregation case Jeffers v. Whitley.

On January 22, 1963, the first day that African American children in Caswell County entered previously all-white public schools, two white men forced the car Brown was riding in to a halt on a rural road. Brown fired a gun, wounding both, and surrendered to authorities.

Contemporary and later accounts state that he was convicted of assault with a deadly weapon and served a 90‑day jail sentence. His struggle and the retaliation his family experienced became the subject of a 2004 non‑fiction book, Dead-End Road, by Deborah F. Brown.

== Early life and family ==
Little has been published in scholarly sources about Brown's early life. A local historical account compiled by the Caswell County Historical Association lists him as "Jasper Brown (1918–1997)" and identifies him as a Black farmer living in Caswell County.

Court records from Jeffers v. Whitley describe "the adult plaintiffs, Jasper Brown and wife, Odessa Brown" and their minor children Nathan, Lunsford, and Shelia Brown, who lived at the end of a dead‑end county road about one and a half miles from Yanceyville. A later newspaper article cited the names of his four school‑age children, noting that he drove them to school in Yanceyville each day.

Brown's extended family remained active in public life. One of his grandsons, Jason Brown, later became a National Football League (NFL) player and farmer in North Carolina. In a 2014 interview, Jason Brown described his grandfather as an important local civil rights activist who ran a farm in nearby Caswell County and recounted family stories of threats and violence linked to his grandfather's desegregation efforts.

== School desegregation activism ==
After the United States Supreme Court's decision in Brown v. Board of Education (1954), Caswell County continued to operate separate Black and white schools under North Carolina's pupil assignment laws. Black parents in the county sought to end this system. As early as 1955, they petitioned the Caswell County Board of Education to desegregate the schools, but the board maintained racially separate assignments.

On August 6, 1956, a group of fifteen Black parents submitted a petition asking the Caswell County board to reorganize the school system on a non‑racial basis and comply with the Supreme Court's rulings. When the board refused, the parents appealed to the State Superintendent of Public Instruction and the State Board of Education, again without success.

On December 10, 1956, Brown joined other parents and their children in filing a federal class‑action lawsuit challenging the segregated operation of Caswell County's public schools. The case, eventually known as Jeffers v. Whitley, named county and state education officials as defendants and sought an injunction requiring desegregation and a nondiscriminatory assignment plan. Brown appeared in the litigation as the father and next friend of minors Nathan Brown, Lunsford Brown, and Shelia Brown.

In the district court, evidence showed that Caswell County maintained separate schools for white and Black students and that the Brown children and other Black plaintiffs continued to be assigned to all‑Black schools, including Caswell County Training School, even when closer white schools were available. In a 1961 opinion, Judge Edwin M. Stanley noted that the Brown family lived at the end of a dead‑end road, that a bus for Caswell County Training School went to within four‑tenths of a mile of their home, that the nearest bus route for the white Bartlett Yancey School was two and a half miles away, and that the two schools in Yanceyville were only a short distance apart.

In October 1962, the Fourth Circuit reversed much of the district court's decision. It held that Brown's children and other named minor plaintiffs had been improperly denied transfers to the white Bartlett Yancey School and were "entitled to individual relief", and directed that they be admitted if they presented themselves for enrollment at the beginning of a school term. The court also ordered that no student be refused admission to a school because of race and that requests for transfer to schools attended by another race be "freely and readily" granted absent legitimate administrative reasons.

According to later summaries by the Caswell County Historical Association and by promotional materials for Dead-End Road, Brown's efforts were coordinated through the Caswell County branch of the NAACP, which supported petitions, administrative appeals, and the federal lawsuit as part of a sustained campaign to desegregate the schools beginning in 1956.

== 1963 school integration and shooting incident ==
Following the Fourth Circuit's ruling and subsequent federal directives, Caswell County was required to allow limited "freedom of choice" transfers that enabled a small number of Black students to enroll in previously all‑white schools starting in January 1963. On January 22, 1963, sixteen African American students, including Brown's children, entered four formerly all‑white schools in the county.

A contemporaneous account reproduced by the Caswell County Historical Association, drawn from reporting by The Baltimore Sun, describes Brown as a Black farmer and civil rights leader who took his four children—Nathan, Jocylin, Shelia, and Lunsford—to the white elementary and secondary school in Yanceyville that morning while newspaper photographers recorded the scene. Later that morning, Brown sought out the county sheriff, saying that a group of white youths was following him and that he feared for his life, but was told that the sheriff could not act until "something happened".

That afternoon, on a rural dirt road near his home, a 1956 Mercury carrying two white men forced the car carrying Brown and his companions to a halt. Brown then fired a gun, grazing the head of N. L. Oliver Jr. and wounding James Nixon in the shoulder. Brown then surrendered to authorities, and the incident was soon reported to Attorney General Robert F. Kennedy due to its gravity.

Brown was charged in state court with assault with a deadly weapon. Though contemporaneous accounts characterized the shooting as self‑defense, he was tried, convicted, and sentenced to 90 days in jail, which he served in 1963. Book descriptions and local historical notes indicate that the case attracted national attention and was covered in magazines such as Ebony and Newsweek.

Several sources, including the Caswell County Historical Association's summary of Dead-End Road, state that Thurgood Marshall, then associated with the NAACP Legal Defense and Educational Fund, assisted in Brown's legal defense during the trial.

== Harassment, retaliation, and later life ==
While Brown awaited trial, his family and the other Black students who had transferred to white schools faced extensive harassment. Deborah F. Brown's narrative and local historical summaries describe white men bombing or dynamiting the yard around the Brown family home and note that the family received repeated threats on their lives.

A March 1963 article in The News & Observer on an NAACP‑backed lawsuit reported that Black students who integrated Caswell County's white schools were subjected to physical intimidation and emotional abuse, and that the suit alleged officials had failed to protect those students adequately.

After serving his sentence, Brown returned to his farm in Caswell County. According to Doug Struck's 1984 article in The Baltimore Sun, as cited by the Caswell County Historical Association, local white residents and businesses then subjected him to an informal economic boycott: they refused to sell him fuel oil, farm supplies, and other necessities, effectively cutting off his livelihood. Under this pressure, Brown eventually left Caswell County.

== Legacy ==
Brown's efforts to desegregate Caswell County's schools have been identified by local historians as a pivotal episode in the county's civil rights history. His role as a parent–plaintiff in Jeffers v. Whitley and as a parent of some of the first Black students to attend previously all‑white schools in Caswell County is documented in federal court opinions, NAACP Legal Defense Fund records, regional newspaper coverage, and later historical summaries of school desegregation in North Carolina.

Deborah F. Brown's 2004 book Dead-End Road provides a narrative of his efforts to secure equal educational opportunities for his children and other Black students in Caswell County. Publisher and local historical descriptions present the book as a history of his struggle to integrate the county's public schools and state that his case attracted national attention, including coverage in Ebony and Newsweek and assistance from Thurgood Marshall during his criminal trial.

Local historical organizations, including the Caswell County Historical Association, continue to feature Brown's story in discussions of school desegregation and the civil rights movement in rural North Carolina, portraying his family's experiences as illustrative of both the possibilities and the personal costs of challenging Jim Crow in small communities.

== See also ==
- Brown v. Board of Education
- Civil rights movement
- Caswell County, North Carolina
- Caswell County Training School
