= Oveta =

Oveta is an uncommon feminine given name. Bearers include:

- A. Oveta Fuller (1955–2022), African-American microbiologist
- Oveta Culp Hobby (1905–1995), American government official and businesswoman, first director of the Women's Army Corps and first United States Secretary of Health and Human Services
