= Pennebaker =

Pennebaker is a surname. Notable people with the surname include:

- Charles D. Pennebaker (1825–1888), American lawyer and politician from Kentucky
- D. A. Pennebaker (1925–2019), American documentary filmmaker
- James W. Pennebaker (born 1950), American social psychologist
- John Pennebaker (1943–2016), American lawyer and politician from Mississippi
