= Bartlett Yancey High School =

American public school in North Carolina

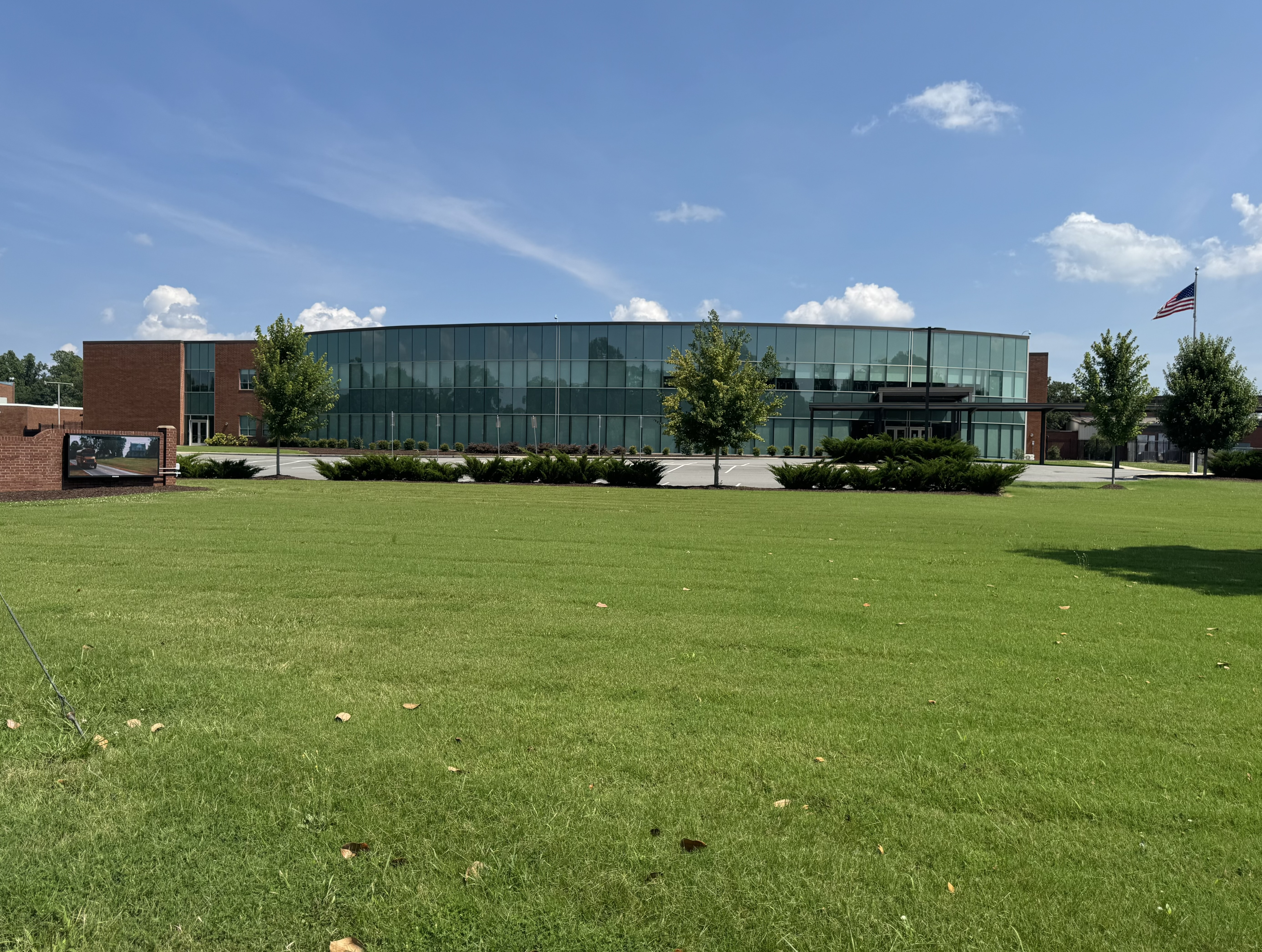
- Bartlett Yancey High School in July 2025

Location
- 466 E Main St. Yanceyville, North Carolina 27379; United States; 36°24′18″N 79°19′29″W

Information
- Motto: "Helping Students to Excel"
- Established: 1923 (103 years ago)
- School district: Caswell County Schools
- CEEB code: 344510
- Principal: Decolia Carter
- Teaching staff: 43.78 (on an FTE basis)
- Grades: 9–12
- Enrollment: 691 (2023–2024)
- Student to teacher ratio: 15.78
- Colors: Navy blue, orange, and white
- Team name: Buccaneers
- Website: byshs.caswell.k12.nc.us

Bartlett Yancey High School (BYHS), also referred to as Bartlett Yancey Senior High School, is a public high school located in Yanceyville, North Carolina, serving students in the ninth through twelfth grades. It is in the Caswell County Schools school district.

The school occupies an approximately forty-six-acre campus, extending north to East Main Street.

== History ==
The high school is named after U.S. Congressman Bartlett Yancey and was founded in 1923. Grades 9–11 were originally taught at the Bartlett Yancey School, which also enrolled lower grades. In the mid-1930s, those grades moved to a newly constructed Bartlett Yancey High School building near the original school in Yanceyville. A twelfth grade was added to North Carolina public high schools in 1942.

By 1951, the Bartlett Yancey campus, which now housed all grades, was badly overcrowded. To address the growing student population, an eight‑classroom high school building was constructed in 1957, and a gymnasium addition designed by the architectural firm Stinson‑Arey‑Hall was completed in 1960. The firm also designed additional Bartlett Yancey High School‑related structures in the 1960s and 1970s, as well as other school facilities elsewhere in the Caswell County system.

During the era of school segregation, Bartlett Yancey High School served white students exclusively, while many African American students in the county attended Caswell County Training School, later renamed Caswell County High School in the early 1960s.

Vanessa Siddle Walker, a 1976 graduate of Bartlett Yancey High School, provides detailed insights into Caswell County Training School in her 1996 book, Their Highest Potential: An African American School Community in the Segregated South. Today, the former school is a designated site on the National Register of Historic Places in Caswell County.

In 1969, Bartlett Yancey High School became the county’s only public high school. As a result of school integration and consolidation, Caswell County High School was closed, and its high school students transferred to Bartlett Yancey. As of 2026, it is the only high school in the Caswell County school system.

== Academics ==
Students at Bartlett Yancey Senior High School have the opportunity to take Advanced Placement coursework and exams. The school also offers an associate's pathway, allowing students to graduate with a high school diploma from the school and an associate's degree from Piedmont Community College.

== Athletics ==
As of 2025, sports teams at Bartlett Yancey High School compete in the Mid-State 3A/4A/5A Conference, which is part of the NCHSAA.

In the 2019 football season, the eighth-seeded Buccaneers finished second in the Mid-State 2A and set a school record for wins in a season.

In addition to football, BYHS's sports programs include baseball, basketball, cross country, soccer, softball, tennis, track and field, volleyball, and wrestling.

== Facility improvement project ==
In June 2020, Bartlett Yancey High School began undergoing renovations as well as the demolition of segments of the existing school. A new two-story building was constructed, which included classrooms, science labs, a media center, a kitchen and dining area, a security station, and administrative and guidance offices. Infrastructure improvements were also made throughout the campus.

The project had an original budget of $35.1 million but finished with an actual construction cost of less than $29 million. After applying a $15 million grant received for the project, the net cost to Caswell County was under $14 million. The new facility was completed in 2022.

== Notable alumni ==
- Mic'hael Brooks (born 1991), former NFL player
- A. Oveta Fuller (1955–2022), professor of microbiology and immunology
- Maud Gatewood (1934–2004), artist
- John Gunn (1939–2010), race car driver
- Vanessa Siddle Walker (born 1958), professor emerita of African American educational studies at Emory University
- Neal Watlington (1922–2019), MLB player for the Philadelphia Athletics
- Hugh Webster (1943–2022), North Carolina state senator
