= Caswell County Schools =

School district in North Carolina, US

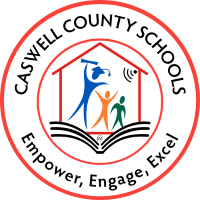

Location
- Caswell County, North Carolina United States

District information
- Type: Public
- Motto: "Empower, Engage, Excel"
- Grades: PK–12
- Superintendent: Lance Stokes
- Accreditation: AdvancED
- Schools: 6
- NCES District ID: 3700660

Students and staff
- Students: 2,149 (2023–24)
- Teachers: 139.27 (FTE)
- Student–teacher ratio: 15.43:1

Other information
- Website: www.caswell.k12.nc.us

Caswell County Schools is a PK–12 public school district serving Caswell County, North Carolina, United States. The district operates four elementary schools, one middle school, and one high school and enrolled 2,149 students with 139.27 full-time equivalent classroom teachers in the 2023–2024 school year, a student–teacher ratio of about 15:1. As of 2026, the district’s superintendent is Lance Stokes.

== Student demographics ==
According to the National Center for Education Statistics, Caswell County Schools enrolled 2,149 students and employed 139.27 full-time equivalent classroom teachers in 2023–2024, for a student–teacher ratio of 15.43:1.

== Governance ==
Caswell County Schools is governed by a seven-member elected board of education, which sets policy and appoints a superintendent to oversee daily operations. The system is part of the North Carolina State Board of Education’s Fifth Education District.

Superintendents of Caswell County Schools have included Floyd M. "Skip" Rowland Jr., Douglas N. Barker (2001–2013), and Sandra Carter (2017–2023). After Carter’s tenure, Barker returned as interim superintendent, followed by the appointment of JoAnna Gwynn effective July 1, 2024, and the board later named Bartlett Yancey High School principal Lance Stokes as interim superintendent. On June 8, 2026, the Caswell County Board of Education voted 4–3 to name Lance Stokes superintendent of Caswell County Schools, effective July 1.

== Integration history ==
During the era of legally segregated schools, many African American students in Caswell County attended Caswell County Training School, later known as Caswell County High School, while white students attended schools such as Bartlett Yancey High School in Yanceyville. Following the Brown v. Board of Education decisions, local African American civil rights activism and federal court rulings gradually forced the district to dismantle its dual school system.

After years of litigation, protests, and "freedom of choice" assignment plans that produced only limited desegregation, the Caswell County Board of Education implemented a plan for full integration in 1969. High school grades were consolidated at Bartlett Yancey High School, the former Caswell County High School was converted to N. L. Dillard Junior High School, and elementary schools were organized on a non-segregated basis. Vanessa Siddle Walker’s work on Caswell County Training School emphasizes how African American educators, parents, and students created a supportive school community despite segregated conditions.

== Member schools ==
Caswell County Schools operates six schools serving grades pre-kindergarten through twelve.

=== High school ===
- Bartlett Yancey High School (Yanceyville)

=== Middle schools ===
- N.L. Dillard Middle School (Yanceyville)

=== Elementary schools ===
- North Elementary School (Providence)
- Oakwood Elementary School (Yanceyville)
- South Elementary School (Mebane)
- Stoney Creek Elementary School (Reidsville)

== See also ==
- List of school districts in North Carolina

== Works cited ==
- Walker, Vanessa Siddle (1996). Their Highest Potential: An African American School Community in the Segregated South. Chapel Hill: University of North Carolina Press. ISBN 9780807845813.
