= National Register of Historic Places listings in Walthall County, Mississippi =

Location of Walthall County in Mississippi

This is a list of the National Register of Historic Places listings in Walthall County, Mississippi.

This is intended to be a complete list of the properties and districts on the National Register of Historic Places in Walthall County, Mississippi, United States. Latitude and longitude coordinates are provided for many National Register properties and districts; these locations may be seen together in a map.

There are 6 properties and districts listed on the National Register in the county.

This National Park Service list is complete through NPS recent listings posted March 14, 2025.

== Current listings ==
	Name on the Register	Image	Date listed	Location	City or town	Description
1	China Grove Methodist Church	China Grove Methodist Church	July 5, 1984 (#84002350)	Mississippi Highway 585; 31°12′33″N 90°03′28″W	Tylertown vicinity	
2	George H. Collins House	George H. Collins House	March 16, 1992 (#92000102)	615 Union Rd. 31°07′23″N 90°08′26″W	Tylertown	
3	Mt. Moriah School		June 5, 2017 (#100001031)	149 Mt. Moriah Rd. 31°03′25″N 90°05′43″W	Tylertown vicinity	
4	New Orleans and Great Northern Railroad Depot-Tylertown	New Orleans and Great Northern Railroad Depot-Tylertown	April 14, 2000 (#00000378)	Franklin Highway; 31°06′54″N 90°08′26″W	Tylertown	
5	Walthall County Courthouse and Jail	Walthall County Courthouse and Jail	November 10, 1994 (#94001302)	200 Ball Ave. 31°07′00″N 90°08′29″W	Tylertown	
6	Walthall County Training School	Walthall County Training School	June 5, 2017 (#100001032)	181 Ginntown Rd. 31°04′10″N 90°08′49″W	Tylertown vicinity	

== See also ==
- List of National Historic Landmarks in Mississippi
- National Register of Historic Places listings in Mississippi
