= Lewis Thomas Christmas =

American reverend, teacher and politician

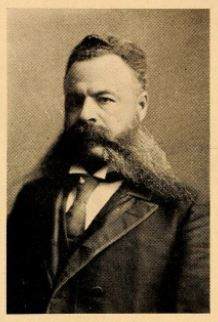

North Carolina House of Representatives
- In office 1879–1880

Personal details
- Born: November 5, 1855 Warren County, North Carolina
- Died: June 27, 1928 (aged 72) Raleigh, North Carolina
- Party: Republican

Lewis Thomas Christmas (November 5, 1855 - June 27, 1928) was a reverend, teacher, school principal, and state legislator in North Carolina. He represented Warren County, North Carolina, in the North Carolina House of Representatives from 1879 to 1880.

== Biography ==
Lewis Thomas Christmas was born November 5, 1855 to Marcus George Christmas and Henrietta Davis in Warren County, North Carolina. Lewis, Henrietta, and his maternal relatives were enslaved by Dr. Stephen Davis and Dr. Davis’s sons, Hugh Davis and Peter Randolph Davis II.

After emancipation, Lewis grew up on a 94-acre farm carved out of Melrose Plantation, the Warren County plantation his late paternal grandfather and namesake, attorney and planter Lewis Yancey Christmas, once owned. Lewis Thomas's father, Marcus George Christmas, had received the farm in exchange for relinquishing his legal claim against Joseph Speed Jones, a cousin and executor of Lewis Yancey Christmas's estate who failed to emancipate Marcus or supply him the legacy his father had left for him in his will.

Lewis Thomas Christmas filed a successful $5000 lawsuit against the Raleigh and Gaston Railroad in 1876 after the railroad had removed Christmas from one of its passenger cars, refusing to honor his first-class ticket.

Elected to represent Warren County, Lewis became a member of the North Carolina House of Representatives in August 1878. He served the county with fellow African-American Republican Hawkins Wesley Carter. In the 1879 session, he served on the Counties, Cities, Towns and Townships and the Deaf and Dumb and the Blind Asylum committees and introduced a bill to provide compensation for people who had been wrongfully imprisoned.

In 1884, Lewis graduated from the Theological Department of Shaw University, the same department where he would later teach.

On February 25, 1885, Christmas married Mary Magdalene Smith, the daughter of Susan Smith and Thomas Bridgers, in Wake County, North Carolina.

He served as principal of the Wilmington Training School.

A Baptist, Lewis was the pastor of the Central Baptist Church in Wilmington, North Carolina. He also served as State Missionary for the Negro State Baptist convention for many years. In 1920, he was awarded a Doctor of Divinity degree from the Florida Baptist College.

He authored An Evil Router, a missionary pamphlet intended to "medicate moral derelicts".

Lewis Thomas Christmas died June 27, 1928, at home in Breezy Heights, a district in Raleigh, North Carolina, and was survived by his wife and daughter as well as seven siblings. His remains were interred at Mount Hope Cemetery in Raleigh.

== See also ==
- African American officeholders from the end of the Civil War until before 1900
- Isaac Alston, state senator from Warren County in 1879
