= Training school =

Training school may refer to:

- Training school (United Kingdom), a former type of specialist school in England that specialised in adult education and teacher training
- Training school (United States), a former type of segregated school in the United States and Canada
