= Prater & Hayes =

American musicians

Prater & Hayes were American black musicians from Vicksburg, Mississippi, United States, who made recordings in the 1920s. Matthew Prater was born in West Corinth, Mississippi in 1885 and played the mandolin; Napoleon Hayes was born in New Albany, Mississippi on June 30, 1889, and played the guitar.

They were the first to record Scott Joplin's "The Entertainer", under the title "Easy Winner", combining it with another song. Another tune they borrowed from Joplin was "Somethin' Doin'". Their recordings showed a fusion of musical styles, of string band, blues and ragtime. Prater took the lead with his mandolin, while Hayes played rhythm guitar. They recorded music under two different group names, the 'Blue Boys' and the 'Johnson Boys' (with Lonnie Johnson).

The three records they produced were recorded in Memphis, Tennessee, on February 15, 1928.

- "Easy Winner", the Blue Boys (combined Joplin's "The Entertainer" with "Creole Belles", by J. Bodewalt Lampe)
- "Memphis Stomp" (side 2) with Lonnie Johnson on fiddle
- "Prater Blues" (side 1), the Johnson Boys
- "Violin Blues" (side 2), the Johnson Boys (Lonnie Johnson on fiddle)
- "Somethin' Doin'"
- "Nothin' Doin'"

Their lives after 1928, and the dates of their deaths, are unreported.
