= Hubert D. Stephens =

American politician (1875–1946)

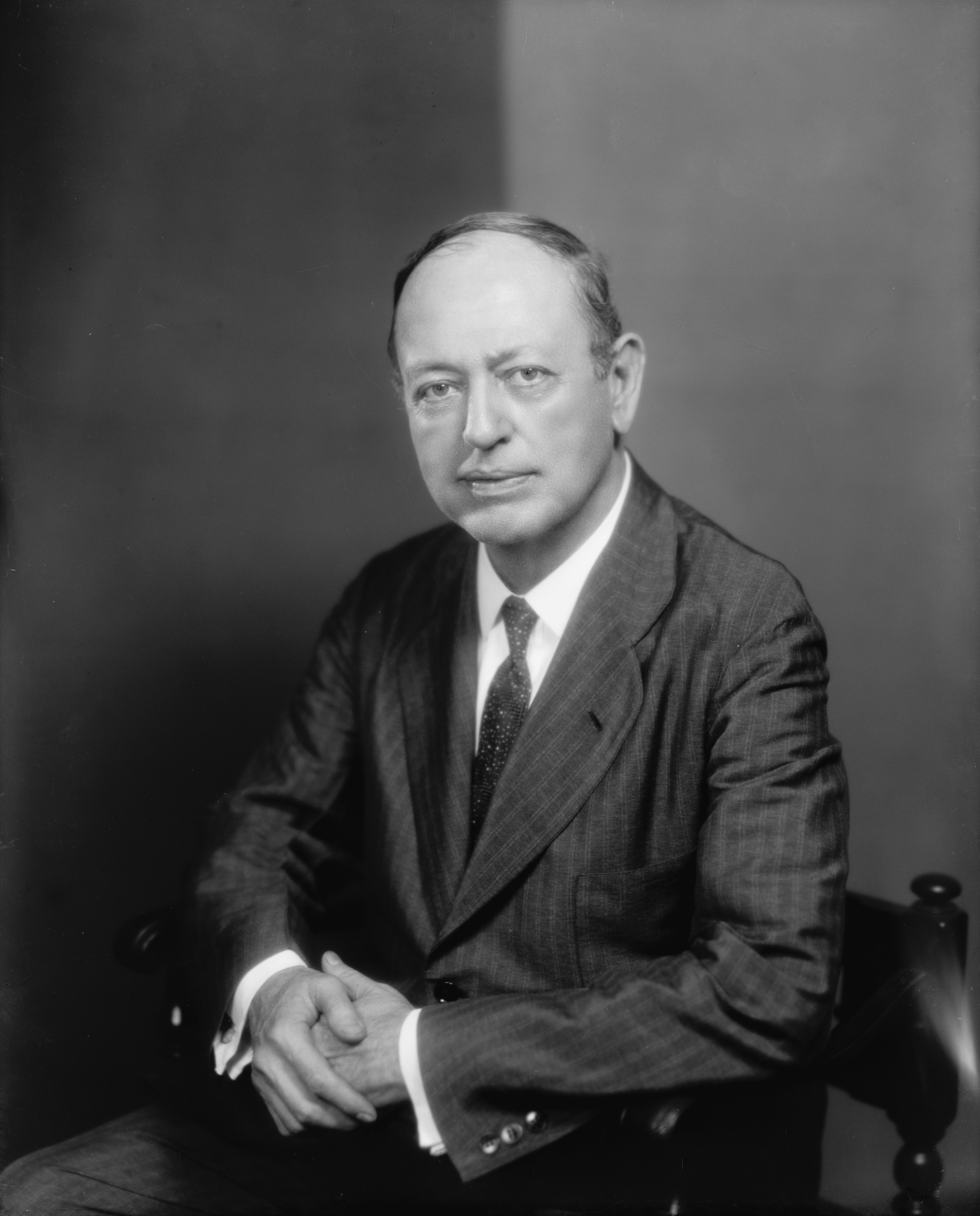
- Stephens, 1905–1945

United States Senator from Mississippi
- In office March 4, 1923 – January 3, 1935
- Preceded by: John Sharp Williams
- Succeeded by: Theodore Bilbo

Member of the U.S. House of Representatives from Mississippi's 2nd district
- In office March 4, 1911 – March 3, 1921
- Preceded by: Thomas Spight
- Succeeded by: Bill G. Lowrey

Personal details
- Born: Hubert Durrett Stephens; July 2, 1875 New Albany, Mississippi
- Died: March 14, 1946 (aged 70) New Albany, Mississippi
- Resting place: Pythian Cemetery, New Albany, Mississippi
- Party: Democratic
- Education: University of Mississippi

Hubert Durrett Stephens (July 2, 1875 – March 14, 1946) was an American lawyer and politician who served two terms as a Democratic United States senator from Mississippi from 1923 until 1935.

== Early life and education ==
Stephens was born in New Albany, Mississippi. He attended the University of Mississippi and played football for one of the school's first teams. He graduated from the university's law school and soon began to practice law in New Albany.

=== Early political career ===
He served as a town alderman in New Albany for one term, then in 1907, he received an appointment to fill a vacancy as district attorney in the Third Judicial Circuit. In 1908, he was elected to a full term.

== U.S. House of Representatives ==
In 1910, Stephens ran for a seat in the U.S. House of Representatives. He won election and four subsequent re-elections, serving five consecutive terms from 1911 to 1921.

He was a supporter of President Woodrow Wilson. Stephens advocated for a free trade approach and thus opposed the protective tariff that was a hotly debated issue of the day. He rose to the rank of vice chairman of the Banking and Currency Subcommittee, where he called the Federal Reserve Act of 1913 “the greatest piece of constructive legislation that has been enacted in the history of the nation.”

The district Stephens represented was agrarian and rural, leading the congressman to advocate for federal support for rural road and transportation development. Opposed to what he saw as an immoral trafficking of liquor throughout the South, he also supported the prohibition amendment in 1917.

He supported state's rights and opposed progressive social reforms, including voting against giving women the right to vote and reforms in child labor laws, which he believed would negatively impact family farms.

Stephens sometimes hesitated to take a position on issues, such as when he voted “present” on a 1914 bill limiting state public service commissioners in their approval of new railroad stock, and again on a 1916 worker's compensation bill passed by the House. He opposed a bill limiting railroad employees to an eight-hour work day, but supported federalization of the nation's railways during World War I.

Citing health concerns stemming from his struggles with adult-onset diabetes, Stephens did not run for Re-election in 1920.

== U.S. Senate ==
In 1922 Stephens ran for a U.S. Senate seat that became open upon the retirement of John Sharp Williams. In the campaign, he defeated former Senator James K. Vardaman by a vote of 95,351 to 86,853. In 1923, he began the first of two consecutive terms in the Senate.

He served during the national dialogue over the future of the Mississippi River Delta. After the devastating flood in 1927, the Commerce Committee on which he served devoted a great deal of attention to the issue. Stephens aligned himself with others from the lower Mississippi Valley in the contentious debate over establishment of flood control plain in the region. Nevertheless, Stephens gained notoriety mostly for his inaction on the committee and reluctance to take a stand. A prominent national magazine of the day cited Stephens as being “the only senator in recent times who has evinced a willingness to forego his right to talk.”

Stephens generally opposed liberal immigration policies, although he supported legislation paving the way for admission and naturalization of foreign women married to U.S. servicemen. He also supported the legal admission of Mexican beet sugar workers.

He was a leader in the successful enactment a bill to reorganize federal prisons and create the Bureau of Prisons. Stephens proved to be less willing than Mississippi's other senator, Pat Harrison, to accept social and economic advancements.

He supported the candidacy of President Franklin D. Roosevelt, as well as most of the tenets of Roosevelt's New Deal. Even during this period, Stephens opposed labor reforms such as the five-day work week. He was a leader in the successful effort to construct the Natchez Trace Parkway.

=== Lynching episode ===
In 1925 Stephens unsuccessfully attempted to intervene in the lynching of L. Q. Ivy, a Black man accused of rape in New Albany. In 1934, he was defeated by Theodore Bilbo in the primary.

=== Defeat ===
In 1934, Stephens campaigned on the platform: “Stand by the president and his program.” His opponent in the race, the infamous Theodore Bilbo, campaigned with the jingoistic rhetorical zeal that would become his trademark, criticizing Stephens for his record against labor reforms and his silence on key issues of the day. Stephens also encountered criticism for his support of an economic act that reduced funding for veterans. Bilbo defeated Stephens and became a national symbol of the anti-Civil Rights bloc in Congress.

== Later career and retirement ==
Stephens was the director of the Reconstruction Finance Corporation from 1935 to 1936. After that, he practiced law in Washington, D.C. before retiring to his Mississippi farm in 1941. Prior to his death, he instructed that his official papers from his time in office be burned, leaving little available record of his public service.

== Death ==
On March 14, 1946, Stephens died in New Albany at the age of 70, following a lengthy period of declining health. His remains were interred in Pythian Cemetery in New Albany.

Party political offices
Preceded by John Sharp Williams	Democratic nominee for U.S. Senator from Mississippi (Class 1); 1922, 1928	Succeeded by Theodore G. Bilbo
U.S. House of Representatives
Preceded by Thomas Spight	Member of the U.S. House of Representatives from Mississippi's 2nd congressional district 1911-1921	Succeeded by Bill G. Lowrey
U.S. Senate
Preceded by John Sharp Williams	U.S. senator (Class 1) from Mississippi; 1923–1935; Served alongside: Pat Harrison	Succeeded by Theodore Bilbo
