= Nicholas Longworth Dillard =

N. L. Dillard
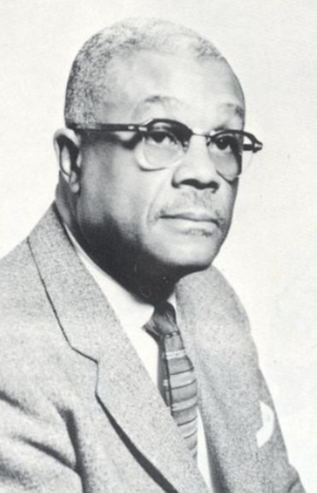
- Dillard in the 1960s
- Born: March 7, 1906; Leaksville (now Eden, North Carolina)
- Died: February 12, 1969 (aged 62)
- Occupation: Educator
- Known for: Establishing and leading Caswell County Training School, advocating for education for African Americans

Nicholas Longworth Dillard (March 7, 1906 – February 12, 1969), also known as N. L. Dillard, was an American educator who made significant contributions to the development of education for African Americans in Caswell County, North Carolina during the era of school segregration.

== Early life and education ==
Born in Leaksville (now Eden, North Carolina), N. L. Dillard pursued higher education, graduating from Shaw University in 1928 and later earning a master's degree from the University of Michigan in 1942.

== Career ==
Dillard's teaching career began at Yanceyville School in 1930, where he became principal in 1932. At the time, Caswell County lacked a high school for African American students. Dillard extended the school's curriculum, allowing students to reach the 11th grade in 1933. This initiative led to the establishment of Caswell County Training School (CCTS) in 1934.

As principal of CCTS, Dillard advocated for improved facilities and resources. His efforts paid off in 1951 with the construction of a new three-story brick school building, following the issuance of school bonds in 1950.

Under his continued leadership, CCTS earned accreditation from the Southern Association of Colleges and Schools in 1955. Notably, it was the only high school in Caswell County, Black or white, to achieve this distinction at the time.

In 1968 and early 1969, before his death in February that year, Dillard assisted with the planning that led to the complete integration of Caswell County's public schools.

== Legacy ==
N. L. Dillard Middle School in Yanceyville is named after him.
