= Walthall County Training School =

School in Mississippi, United States

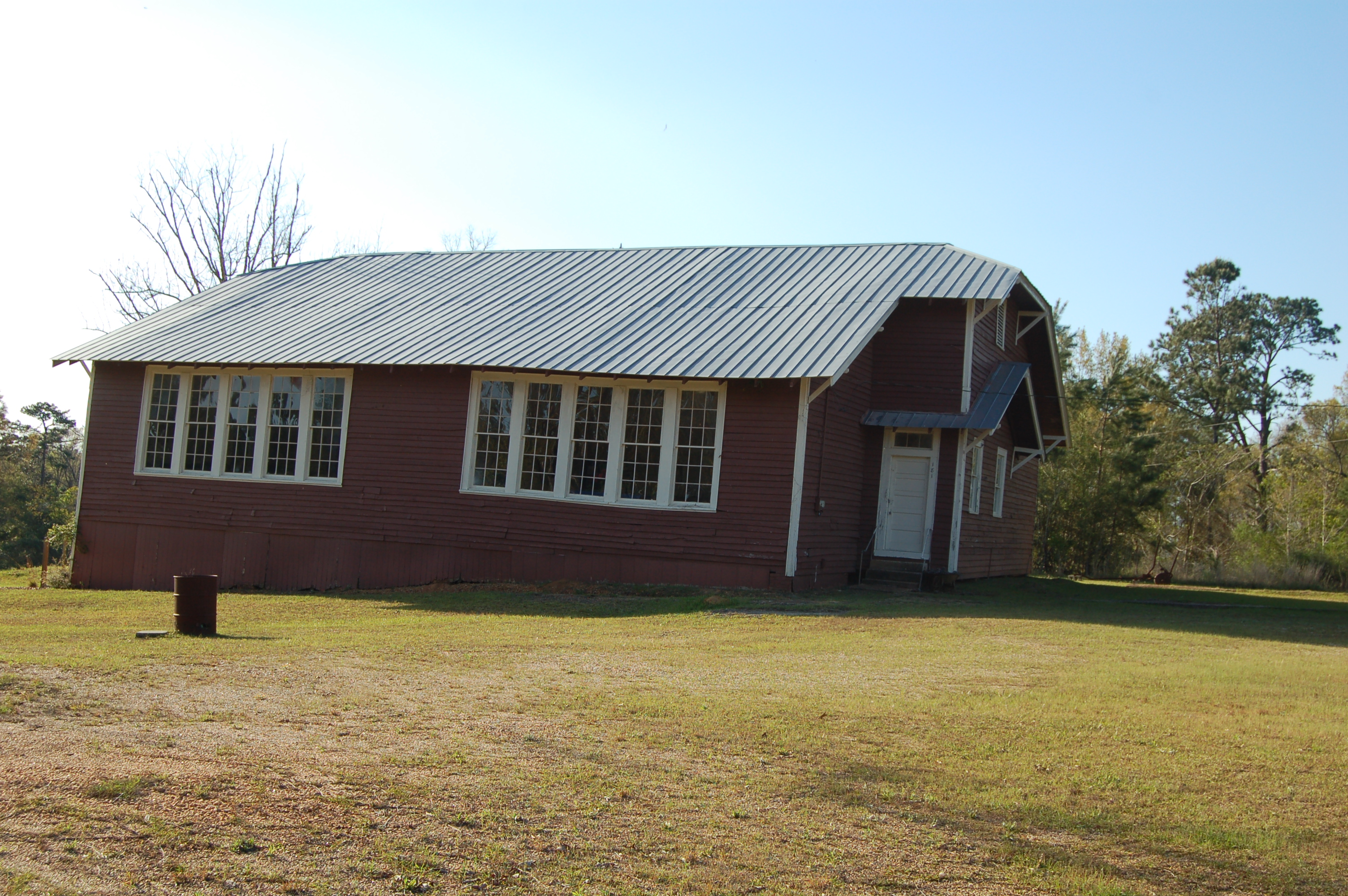

Walthall County Training School, also known as Ginntown School, was a school for African Americans in the community known as Ginntown in Walthall County, Mississippi. For years it was the only school that served black students in the county. Also known as Ginntown / Ginn Town School, it was Rosenwald school and was the only school for blacks in Walthall County. A photo of it from ca. 1938 exists. The school is listed on the National Register of Historic Places.

Melerson Guy Dunham taught at the school. Mt. Moriah Training School near Tylertown, Mississippi followed. It is also listed on the National Register of Historic Places.

In 2010, discussion of segregation in area schools continued on NPR.

Cleopatra Thompson taught at the school. C. C. Bryant was born in the county and became a civil rights activist.

== See also ==
- National Register of Historic Places listings in Walthall County, Mississippi
- Training school (United States)
