= Massachusetts Public Records Law =

Massachusetts state law

Massachusetts Public Records Law is a law in Massachusetts detailing what kinds of documents are actually public records. It is a state law that is similar to the federal Freedom of Information Act, which was signed into law by Lyndon B. Johnson in 1966. According to the Boston Globe newspaper in 2016, "Massachusetts is currently the one state in the country where the Legislature, judiciary, and governor’s office all claim to be completely exempt from the [public records] law." Many voters would welcome more government transparency. For example, in 2020, a "ballot question in 16 house districts found overwhelming support for increasing transparency." Interest groups focusing on the issue include Act on Mass and the New England First Amendment Coalition. A ballot question that will appear before voters on November 3, 2026 would bring the State Legislature and the governor's office under the requirements of Massachusetts Public Records Law.

== Purpose ==
Massachusetts Public Records Law ensures every person has the right to access public information. Massachusetts Secretary of the Commonwealth William F. Galvin sees an “open government” as foundational to “principles of democracy and public participation”, writing that “an informed citizen is better equipped to participate in that process.”

== Requirements ==
The government and other agencies are required under the Public Records Act to disclose records and documents upon request. There are exemptions to Public Records Act that the government can use to keep certain records private. The Massachusetts Public Records Law parallels FOIA. All records including photographs, memos, books, papers, maps, recorded tapes, financial statements, statistical tabulations, or other documentary materials or data are considered public information in Massachusetts, unless they are withheld from public view under one of the sixteen exemptions. An agency or municipality must either produce a copy of public records or provide a written explanation of why the request will take longer to fulfill within ten business days of the request. A reasonable fee may be charged to cover the cost of producing public records, but only if a response is given within ten business days.

== See also ==
- Massachusetts Archives
- Copyright status of works by subnational governments of the United States
- Freedom of information
