= Lynching of L. Q. Ivy =

1925 lynching in the United States

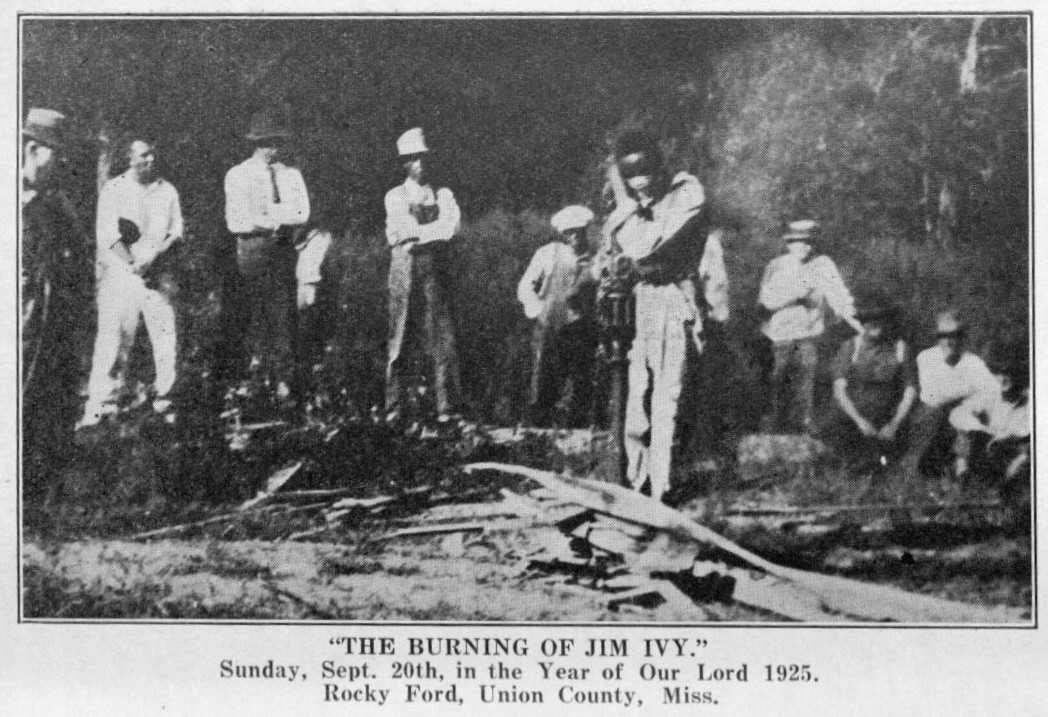
- Location: Rocky Ford, Mississippi (now Etta, Mississippi)
- Date: September 20, 1925; 101 years ago
- Attack type: Assault, kidnapping, torture, murder
- Weapons: Blow torch, chains, guns, rope, Model T axle, lemon squeezers
- Deaths: 1 civilian
- Victim: L. Q. Ivy
- Perpetrators: Lynching conspirators, lynching enablers
- Assailant: Lynch mob
- No. of participants: Over 1000 abducted victim; 400 tortured and burned victim
- Motive: False accusation; Vigilantism; White supremacy
- Convictions: None

L. Q. Ivy was a seventeen-year-old African-American male who was accused of raping a White woman in 1925 in Rocky Ford, Mississippi. He was tortured and burned to death in 1925 by a lynch mob of White people.

== Accusation and search for attacker ==
In September 1925, Bessie Gaines, a 21-year-old White single mother, was raped and severely beaten in Rocky Ford (now known as Etta, Mississippi). A neighbor drove her to the nearest hospital in New Albany, where Union County sheriff John Roberts interviewed her and her family. The sheriff assembled a posse of White men, who used bloodhounds to search for her attacker. The dogs led them to a group of Black timber-cutters, including Cleveland Jones, Sherill Kilpatrick, Spencer Ivy, and L. Q. Ivy.

According to University of Mississippi Professor and journalist LaReeca Rucker, people interviewed "...said Rush Scott, one of the members of the posse that the sheriff deputized to search for Gaines' assailant, told police that from the time the black suspects were dropped off at the logging field, and the time Gaines said the rape occurred, it would have been impossible for anyone to travel on foot the two and a half miles to the cornfield where she was attacked. He also reportedly remarked that he saw the white driver of a gas truck from New Albany, moving across the cornfield."

== Arrest, mob gathering ==
For unknown reasons, the sheriff settled on L. Q. Ivy as the likely culprit, and he was arrested and transported to the hospital in New Albany, and presented to Gaines. She was unable to definitively identify Ivy as her attacker. A contemporary newspaper article states that Ivy confessed around this time, but that account has been contradicted by modern academics. Sheriff Roberts did not hold Ivy in the New Albany jail, but secretly moved him to Aberdeen, because authorities "predicted a riot might occur."

Mob violence was the preferred form of retribution; to white men of pride and honor some crimes were simply too hateful to be left to the ordered redress of the state. Lynching, as United States Senator Bilbo said, was often the only "immediate and proper and suitable punishment." When effected in defense of a white woman's virtue it was not merely the public will summarily executed, it was the highest form of justice known in this world or the next. "... Mississippi's classic Southern gentleman John Sharp Williams ...said that "race is greater than law... and protections of women transcends all law, human and divine." It was a law unto itself.

— Neil R. McMillen

Mayor J.E. Tate, Judge Thomas Pegram, and the sheriff urged calm, and sheriff's deputies confiscated a large number of weapons. New Albany native and U.S. Senator Hubert Stephens attempted to get the mob to disperse. The crowd dispersed after it was revealed that the Sheriff had secreted Ivy "down the river".

== Failed identification ==
That night, a group of men led by Billy Preston entered the home of Judge Pegram, and coerced him into writing a writ to produce Ivy at the hospital on Monday. Sheriff Roberts attempted to defeat the mob by bringing Ivy to the hospital on Sunday morning instead, where he was presented to Bessie Gaines for identification. Gaines could not definitively identify Ivy as the perpetrator, but stated "I'm not sure but he looks like the man." Upon leaving, Preston and the mob accosted the sheriff outside the hospital. The victim's father, Bob Gaines, distracted the crowd by shouting that Bessie was not sure, and asked the crowd not to take hasty action. Roberts, along with the sheriff from Aberdeen, took advantage of the distraction to attempt to hustle Ivy away from the scene.

== Vigilante torture ==
Instead, Union County Sheriff John Roberts took custody of Ivy and attempted to drive him to Holly Springs, leaving behind two deputies to block the mob from following. Under armed threats from the mob, the deputies allowed them to pass, then the sheriff faced a roadblock from the vigilantes. At this point, the sheriff relinquished Ivy into the hands of the mob, just outside the city limits of Myrtle. The mob took him to a location in Rocky Ford, where they tortured him with knives and with fire, dangling him from a rafter. While Ivy continued to maintain his innocence through torture, a larger mob, estimated at 400 gathered.

This mob built a pyre. The mob stripped Ivy, drove a Model T axle into the ground and chained him to it. He was tortured with a blowtorch and lemon squeezers, which were used to squash his testicles into a bloody pulp. They piled crates soaked with kerosene around him. When it was apparent that he would be burned, some sources state that Ivy confessed. According to one source, "Ivy confessed that he was the lone assailant, probably because he wanted to spare the three other African American men who were being held in connection with the attack." After considerable torture, three men stepped forward and set fire to the crates. Ivy died and the stench became objectionable, and more wood was added to the fire to completely consume the body.

== Witness account ==
J.L. Roulhac, a reporter for the Memphis Press-Scimitar witnessed the attack on Ivy first hand, and along with three pictures taken of the murder, published this account:

"I watched a negro burned at the stake at Rocky Ford, Mississippi Sunday afternoon. I watched an angry mob chain him to an iron stake. I watched them pile wood around his helpless body. I watched them pour gasoline on this wood. And I watched three men set this wood on fire. I stood in a crowd of 600 people as the flames gradually crept nearer and nearer to the helpless negro. I watched the blaze climb higher and higher, encircling him without mercy. I heard his cry of agony as the flames reached him and set his clothing on fire. "Oh God; Oh, God!" he shouted. "I didn't do it. Have mercy!" The blaze leaped higher. The negro struggled. He kicked the chain loose from his ankles, but it held his waist and neck against the iron post that was becoming red with the intense heat. "Have mercy, I didn't do it, I didn't do it." he shouted again. "You should have thought of this before." someone shouted from the crowd. There was an instant of silence. Then several voices rose in agreement. Nowhere was there a sign of mercy among the members of the mob, nor did they seem to regret the horrible thing they had done. The negro had supposedly sinned against their race and died a death of torture."

== Aftermath ==
After Ivy was completely burned on the pyre, the mob left, and many complained that they would have to go to New Albany to eat, since the crowd had eaten all the food locally. Sheriff Roberts stated he expected no further violence, and claimed that he did not recognize any members of the mob. The mob was so confident that they would not face any repercussions for their actions, they made no attempt to conceal their identities, and even posed for pictures.

Governor Henry L. Whitfield denounced the lynching of L. Q. Ivy in a signed statement: "The time has come when the law-abiding citizens of Mississippi should assert themselves in no uncertain terms against such mob action and should rally to the support of the peace officers in maintaining the integrity of the law." A book published by James Nathaniel Flowers, President of the Mississippi State Bar Association, said, "State officials, officers and outstanding members of the State Bar Association, and other prominent Mississippians condemn mob violence and call on officers to do their sworn duty." Flowers commented on the lynching of L. Q. Ivy: "The fifth lynching further to blacken the record of this State this year occurred in Union County on Sunday, September 20th, when a mob took the alleged negro rapist from two sheriffs near the Myrtle bridge and burned him at the stake." The book was widely distributed, and went into second printing in 1926.

According to an issue of the Sheet Metal Workers Journal from 1925, copies of the first printing were sent to newspapers not just throughout Mississippi but throughout the entire southern United States, "requesting that the material be made the basis of editorial comment". In addition, "...State officials, members of the Bar Association and other prominent people are distributing the pamphlets widely and are offering medals in each Congressional district for the best essays on the subject by high-school [sic] students". Such a strategy would ensure that the book and its message was widely publicized, and it is likely that this second printing was distributed in a similar manner.
