= Caswell County Training School =

School in Yanceyville, North Carolina (1906–1969)

Coordinates: 36°23′58″N 79°20′00″W

- U.S. National Register of Historic Places
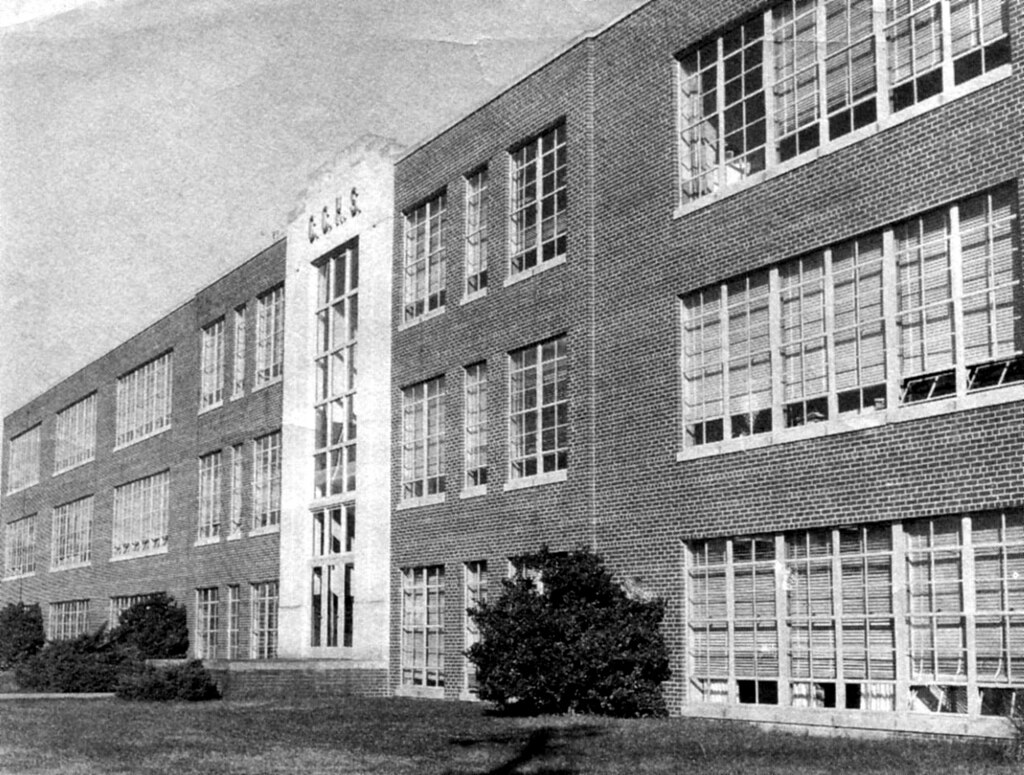
- Caswell County High School in the early 1960s
- Location: 403 Dillard School Dr., Yanceyville, North Carolina, U.S.
- Built: 1949, 1951, 1960
- NRHP reference No.: 100002047
- Added to NRHP: January 25, 2018

Caswell County Training School, later renamed Caswell County High School, is a historic school building and former segregated Black public school located in Yanceyville, North Carolina.

Founded in 1906 when African American residents of Caswell County purchased property to establish a school, it became part of the county's public education system.

Rebuilt as a Rosenwald School in 1924, it achieved state accreditation as a high school in 1934. The Rosenwald building was later replaced by a new campus constructed in phases (1949, 1951, and 1960), which closed in 1969 during desegregation.

The school building was listed on the National Register of Historic Places on January 25, 2018, for its significance in African American heritage, education, and architecture.

Before it was renamed Caswell County Training School in 1934, the institution was known as the Stephens School, Yanceyville School No. 38, and Yanceyville Colored School.

== History ==
=== Founding and early years (1906–1924) ===
In May 1906, seven African American residents of Caswell County purchased a four-room house and four acres from deceased state senator John W. Stephens' family to utilize it as a school. The property had been Stephens' former home.

The school was initially known as Stephens School, and was subsequently referred to as Yanceyville School #38 or Yanceyville Colored School—a term used during segregation to denote many African American schools. It served students in the first through seventh grades and hosted community events, despite being undersized, for nearly two decades.

=== Expansion and transformation (1924–1934) ===
In 1924, Yanceyville School underwent the construction of a one-story, weatherboarded, side-gable-roofed, four-classroom building beside the Stephens House. The building was funded through a combination of public and private contributions, including support from the Rosenwald Fund.

In 1930, the school began to transform under the new leadership of educator Nicholas Longworth Dillard. With an initial enrollment of 80 students and a faculty that included three female teachers, it offered challenging academics and a nurturing environment. The school gradually introduced upper-level courses, enabling students to progress to the end of the 11th grade.

This pioneering pedagogical approach led to the local school board authorizing the hiring of additional teachers in 1933. In 1934, the school attained state accreditation and was renamed Caswell County Training School (CCTS), becoming the first institution officially to provide secondary education to African American students in the county.

=== Growth as a training school (1934–1961) ===
Enrollment at the training school grew steadily. In 1934-1935, 143 secondary school students and 123 elementary school students were taught by a faculty of eight, including N. L. Dillard and his wife, Gladys Dillard. Students published The Monitor newspaper, participated in sports and clubs (including glee, drama, and literary clubs), and held performances that drew large audiences.

In 1935, the North Carolina Emergency Relief Administration (NCERA), a state New Deal program, oversaw approximately $2,000 in school repairs, including painting, site leveling, and landscaping.

However, the school's expansion was hindered by inadequate facilities. An approved $16,000 PWA loan for a new building fell short of what was needed, and the Caswell County Board of Education tabled plans in 1940 for a new brick school, pending further funding availability.

CCTS students thrived despite facility limitations. In 1939-1940, 402 of 440 students attended classes regularly, participating in clubs, and publishing The Torch newspaper. Five of the 61 graduates enrolled in college, and another five planned to attend a normal school or industrial school. Dillard encouraged students to take college entrance exams and helped arrange scholarships at institutions, including his alma mater, Shaw University.

Principal Dillard was known for his exceptional communication skills and personal connection with students, whom he often remembered by name years after graduation. He held high expectations for them and valued education as a privilege. Under his continued leadership, the school flourished as a vital center for academic and vocational education, serving also as a hub for community activities.

By the mid-20th century, the original frame building was all the more overcrowded and outdated. However, with now enough funding for partial upgrades to commence, the school began to modernize with the construction of a new auditorium and cafeteria wing in 1949. This was followed by a three-story brick school building in 1951 that replaced the earlier structure, after school construction bonds were issued in 1950.

These upgrades paved the way for academic recognition, as the school earned accreditation from the Southern Association of Colleges and Schools in 1955–the only high school in the county, Black or white, to achieve this distinction.

During the 1955-1956 academic year, 19 faculty members taught 578 secondary school students, while 14 teachers handled the elementary grades. By fall 1957, Dillard stepped down from teaching to focus on the school's administration, which demanded more of his time.

In 1960, a one-story, tripartite red-brick gymnasium was added, further solidifying CCTS’s reputation as the county’s best-equipped educational institution serving the African American community.

=== Caswell County High School (1961–1969) ===
Beginning in September 1961, the campus was renamed Caswell County High School (CCHS). By April 1965, enrollment totaled 1,195 students. The faculty included 42 African American teachers and one white instructor. CCHS continued to provide first through twelfth grade instruction until September 1967, when the primary grades moved to the newly completed Oakwood Elementary School.

The CCHS curriculum included a range of academic, business, agriculture, home economics, industrial arts, health, physical education, music, and art classes. Courses in building construction and public speaking were also offered. Students participated in various extracurricular activities, including band, chorus, student government, and sports teams.

In 1967-1968, CCHS had 838 students in grades 9-12. About 82% participated in non-athletic extracurricular activities, while 4% joined basketball or baseball teams. Despite efforts to ease tensions, the atmosphere was charged ahead of impending school integration, and Dillard’s health had been declining.

=== Closure and legacy ===
After N. L. Dillard's death in February 1969 and the completion of school integration later that year, Caswell County High School was closed. The closed high school building's educational use was promptly reconfigured. The new integrated school at the site was then named N. L. Dillard Junior High School, in recognition of his nearly four decades of service. The building continued as a junior high until 2002, when the school district built a new facility for N. L. Dillard Middle School.

The history of the school during segregation has been studied and analyzed by Vanessa Siddle Walker, a Yanceyville native and academic at Emory University. In books and articles about Caswell County Training School, Walker argues that while the school faced fewer resources compared to white schools in the community, the community support and institutional ethic of the school had positive results on the student population.

Today, the site is listed on the National Register of Historic Places and is managed by Dillard Education and Economic Development Services, which works to preserve and repurpose the property for community use. The school and the legacy of N. L. Dillard's contributions remain an enduring landmark in the history of African American education in Caswell County.

== See also ==
- National Register of Historic Places listings in Caswell County, North Carolina
- Their Highest Potential: An African American School Community in the Segregated South
- Jasper Brown (1918–1997), civil rights activist and farmer
