= Webster High School =

Segregated school in Louisiana, United States

Location
- Minden; Louisiana; United States
- 32.6113°N 93.2734°W

Information
- Mascot: Wolves
- Affiliation: Louisiana Interscholastic Athletic and Literary Organization

Webster High School was a school for African Americans in Louisiana during segregation. Located in Minden, Louisiana, it succeeded Webster Training School.

== History ==
Schooling for African Americans in Webster Parish was in churches until 1922 when Schools Superintendent E. S. Richardson helped organize funding for Webster Training School with Rosenwald Schools funding. A wood frame building for the school was constructed on the eastern edge of town and it offered vocational training. By 1932 Webster Training Institute had several buildings and expanded course offerings.

The Webster Parish Library established in 1929 delivered books to local schools including Webster Training School. A new school building was constructed for it in the 1950s. In 1959 a study comparing student performance in typewriting classes at the school was published. A 1962 document states construction of homes was taught at the school.

Willie D. Moore attracted attention and drew comparison to Satchel Paige for his pitching prowess at Webster.

A Freedom of Choice plan was implemented to allow token desegregating student transfers from 1965 to 1969. After desegregation in 1974 the Webster High building was used for Webster Junior High School.

== Athletics ==
Webster competed in the Louisiana Interscholastic Athletic and Literary Organization (LIALO). Wolves were the school mascot. Ozias Johnson and then Lee Arthur Flentroy were successful coaches at the school.

== Legacy ==
The school's legacy and history were celebrated in 2022 with a ceremony and travelling display about the school and its successful alumni.
