= Massachusetts Archives =

State repository of the Commonwealth

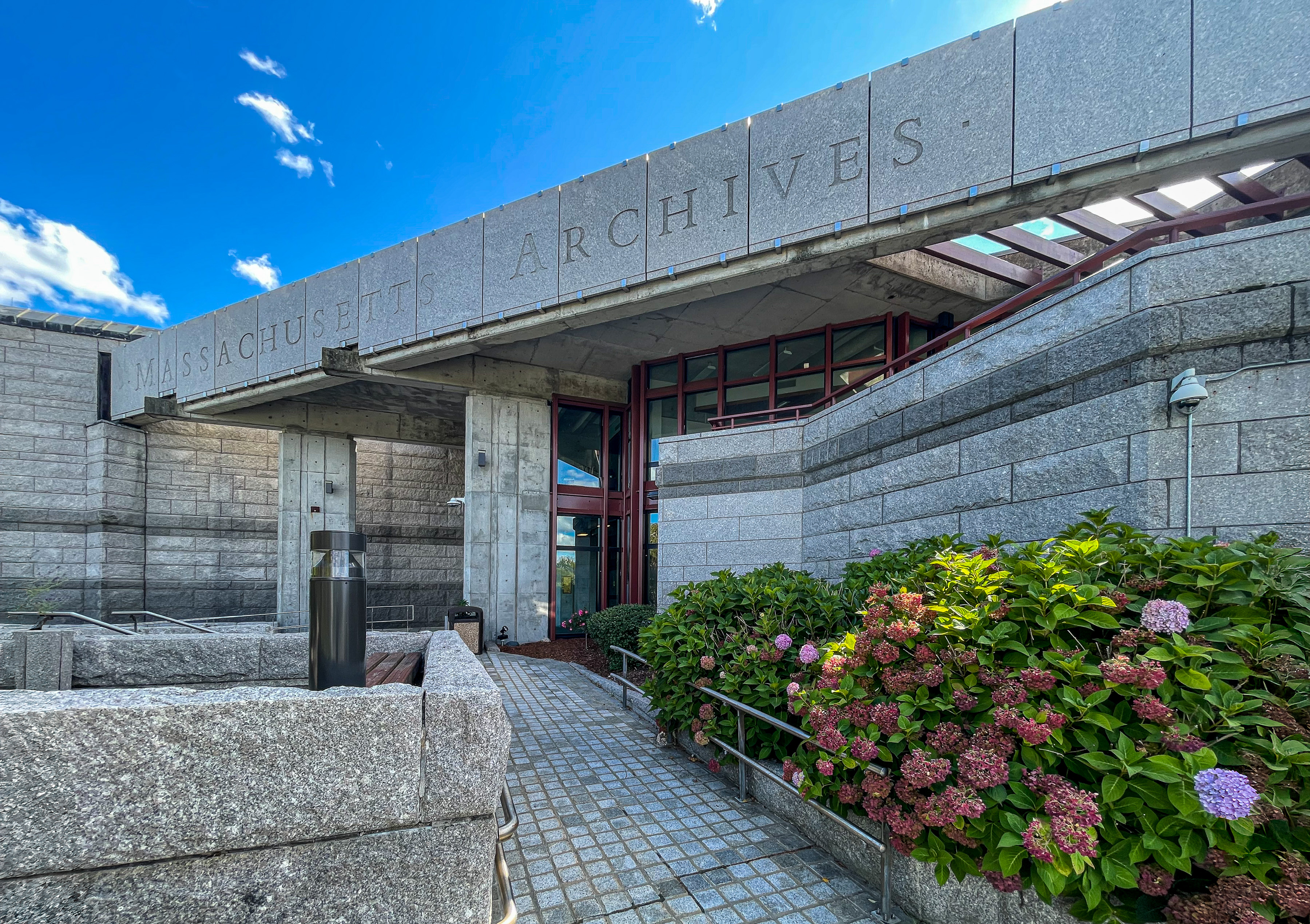
- Interactive map of Massachusetts Archives
- 42.3141°N 71.0349°W
- Location: 220 Morrissey Blvd, 02125, Boston, United States
- Website: Mass State Archives

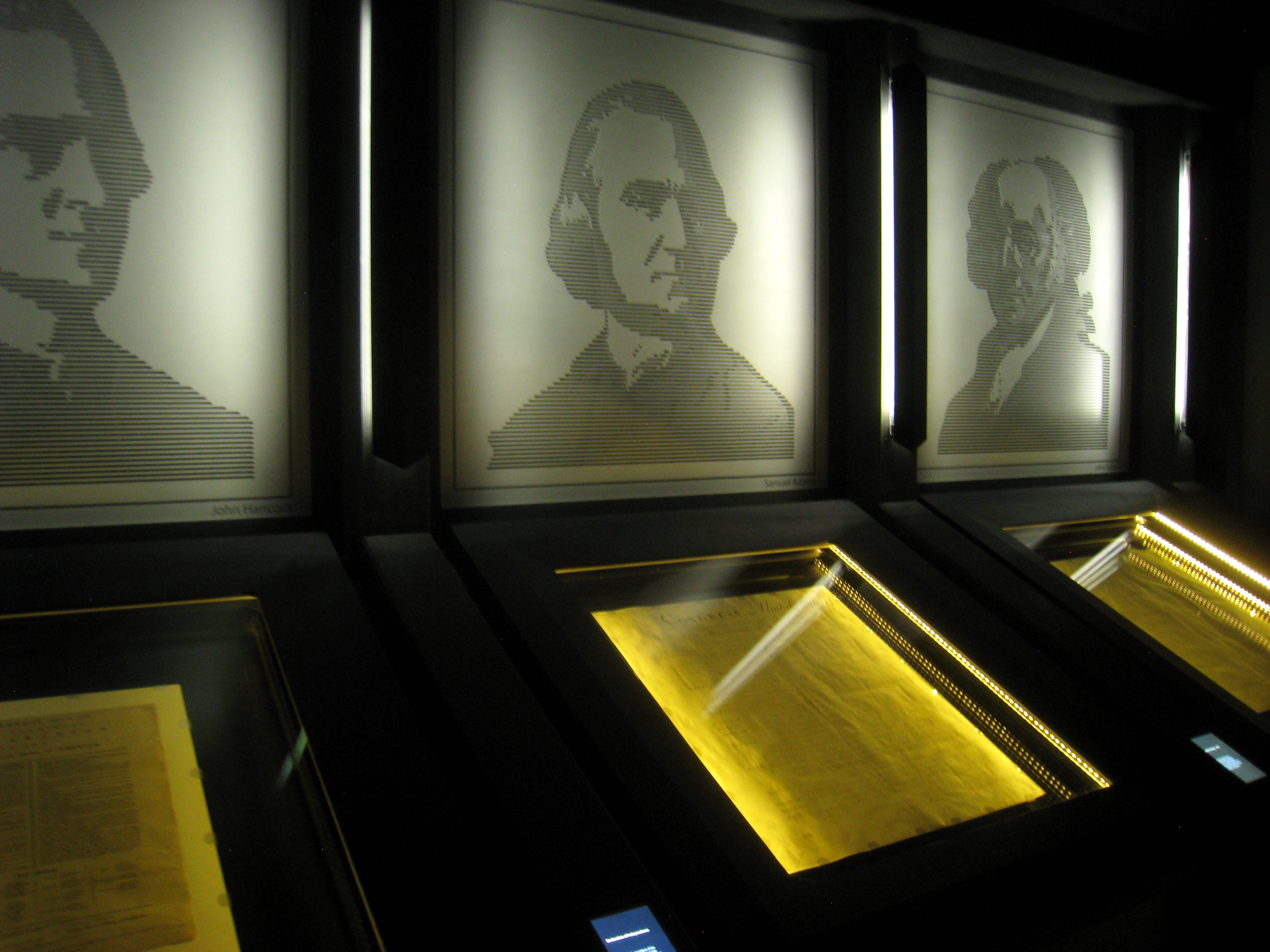
Documents in the Commonwealth Museum

The Massachusetts Archives is the state archive of the commonwealth of Massachusetts. It "serves the Commonwealth and its citizens by preserving and making accessible the records documenting government action and by assisting government agencies in managing their permanent records." The archives occupies quarters on the Columbia Point peninsula in Boston's Dorchester neighborhood on the University of Massachusetts Boston campus. For fiscal year 2010 the state budgeted $389,815 to the archives. The Massachusetts Secretary of the Commonwealth bears responsibility for its administration.

In addition to "the official records created by Massachusetts state government," the archives "counts among its treasures the state's own copies of the Declaration of Independence and the Bill of Rights, the 1780 Massachusetts Constitution, the ... 1629 charter [of Massachusetts Bay], and Revolutionary and Civil War records. It also has numerous documents signed by the likes of George Washington, John Adams, and John Hancock, as well as treaties made with Native American tribes, and slave and witchcraft records. There are also many artifacts, including Paul Revere's engraving plate of the Boston Massacre, and military accouterment from the Civil War to World War I."

== Commonwealth Museum ==
The Archives operates the Commonwealth Museum to educate and display some of its collections of important documents about state and national history. The main permanent exhibit is entitled "The Massachusetts Experiment in Democracy: 1620–Today", and traces the Massachusetts experience through the Colonial, Revolutionary, Federal, and 19th century reform periods. The sub-theme, "Tracing our Roots," tells the story of four representative Massachusetts families of Native American, English, African-American and Irish heritage. The museum also features changing exhibits of state history from its collections. Admission is free.

== History ==
=== 19th century ===
"The proposal for the general arrangement of these papers into volumes was laid before the Massachusetts Historical Society, at their meeting, December 31, 1835. On a motion made by Lemuel Shattuck, Esq., a committee of that body was appointed to petition the Legislature for this object; which resulted in the course of the ensuing session in the passage of a Resolution to that effect, and appropriating means to defray the expense. In pursuance of this Act of the Legislature, the Rev. Joseph B. Felt, a gentleman possessing eminent qualifications for the service, was employed for the execution of the labor."

In 1836 Felt "was commissioned, by Governor Everett, to arrange the State Archives of Massachusetts. ... The amount of work required was truly fearful. The papers were in what seemed inextricable confusion; a vast amount of documents, in the utmost disorder, suffered to accumulate through two centuiies before men's eyes were opened to discern their importance. There was extreme difficulty in deciphering many of them; and but few had distinctive or intelligible endorsements. A careful examination of every sentence, and a discriminating minute scrutiny of their import and bearings, were necessary to arrange them where they belonged; and a comprehensive system of classification had to be organized. ... With a brief interruption, it constituted the regular occupation of about ten years of his laborious life. Before its completion, he was sent to England, commissioned by the State Government for the purpose, to look for duplicates of Colonial and Provincial Records and other public papers, of which the originals had been lost. ... In 1846, the work was accomplished. The papers were divided into appropriate departments; properly classified, according to subjects and dates, carefully and skillfully attached to blank leaves; durably and handsomely bound; titled, with distinct letters and figures; and conspicuously numbered. A General Index was prepared. The shelves of the State Department, present the grand result, in two hundred and forty-one large and thick volumes."

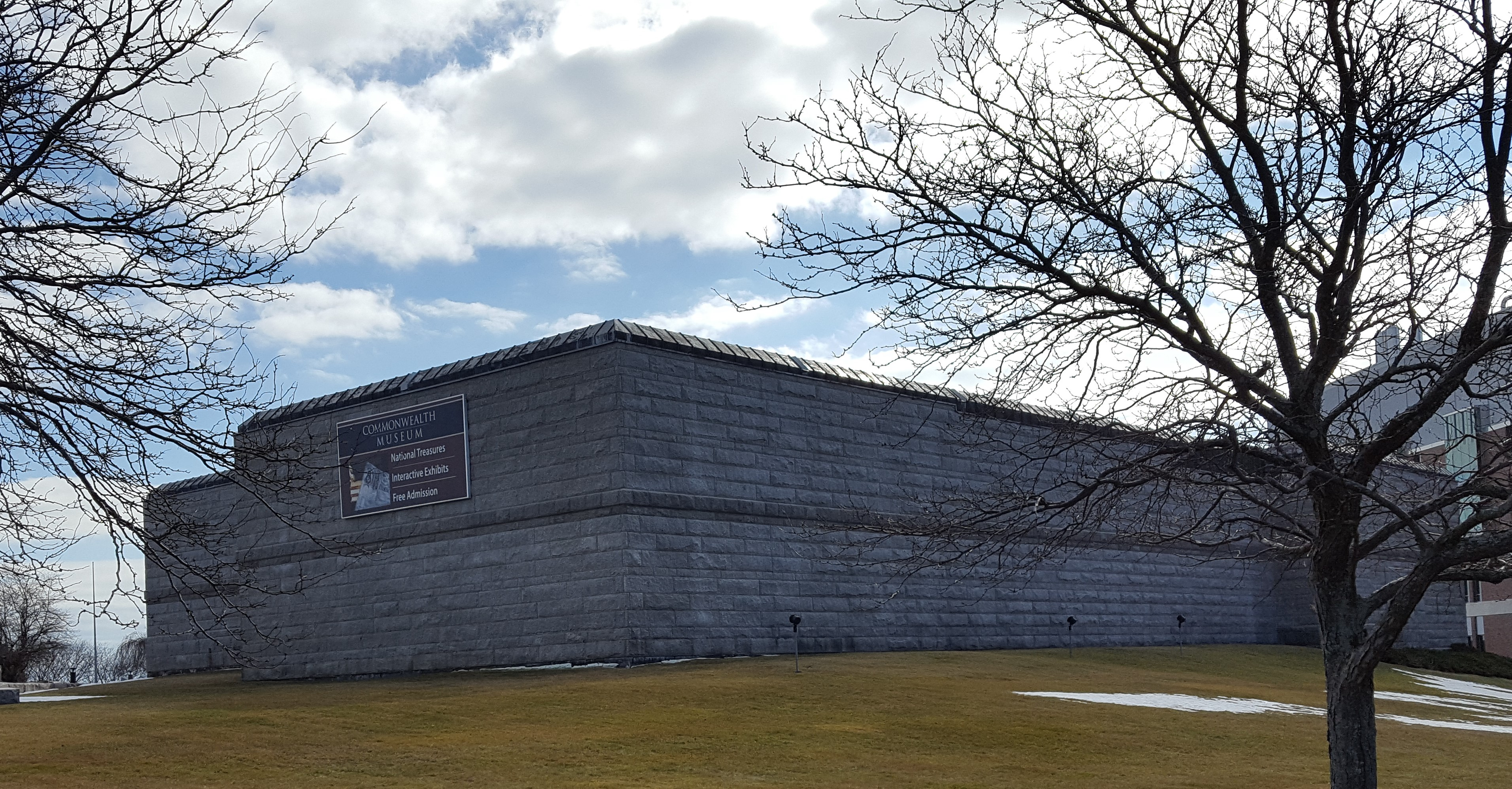
The Commonwealth Museum located at Columbia Point in Dorchester, Massachusetts.

Some scholars disliked Felt's arrangement. Justin Winsor complained in the 1880s: "In our State House ... are tier upon tier of volumes, labelled 'Massachusetts Archives,' so arranged, indeed, in an attempted classification, that it is irksome and unsatisfactory to consult them. They are rich, however, to the patient inquirer in the evidences of Boston's power and significance in our colonial history."

Some of the manuscript materials were transcribed in the 1850s. "The records of the government from its first institution in England down to the overthrow of the charter are almost a history in themselves. The student is no longer required to decipher the ancient writing, for in 1853-54 the records were copied and printed under the editorial care of Dr. N. B. Shurtleff."

=== 20th century ===
"The Massachusetts Archives used to be located at the State House. But after the state's oldest document — the 1629 Charter of Massachusetts Bay — was stolen in 1984, the decision was made to build a new archives near the John F. Kennedy Library and Museum at Columbia Point in Dorchester." (The 1629 charter was later recovered). The new building opened in 1985. "The 100,000-square-foot building ... was designed to resemble the early forts on the surrounding shoreline."

=== 21st century ===
"The state appropriated $390,000 for the archives [in 2010], a 29 percent reduction from the year before. ... John Warner, the head archivist, makes $66,634 a year. The archives budget appears to be one of the lowest in the country."

== Holdings ==
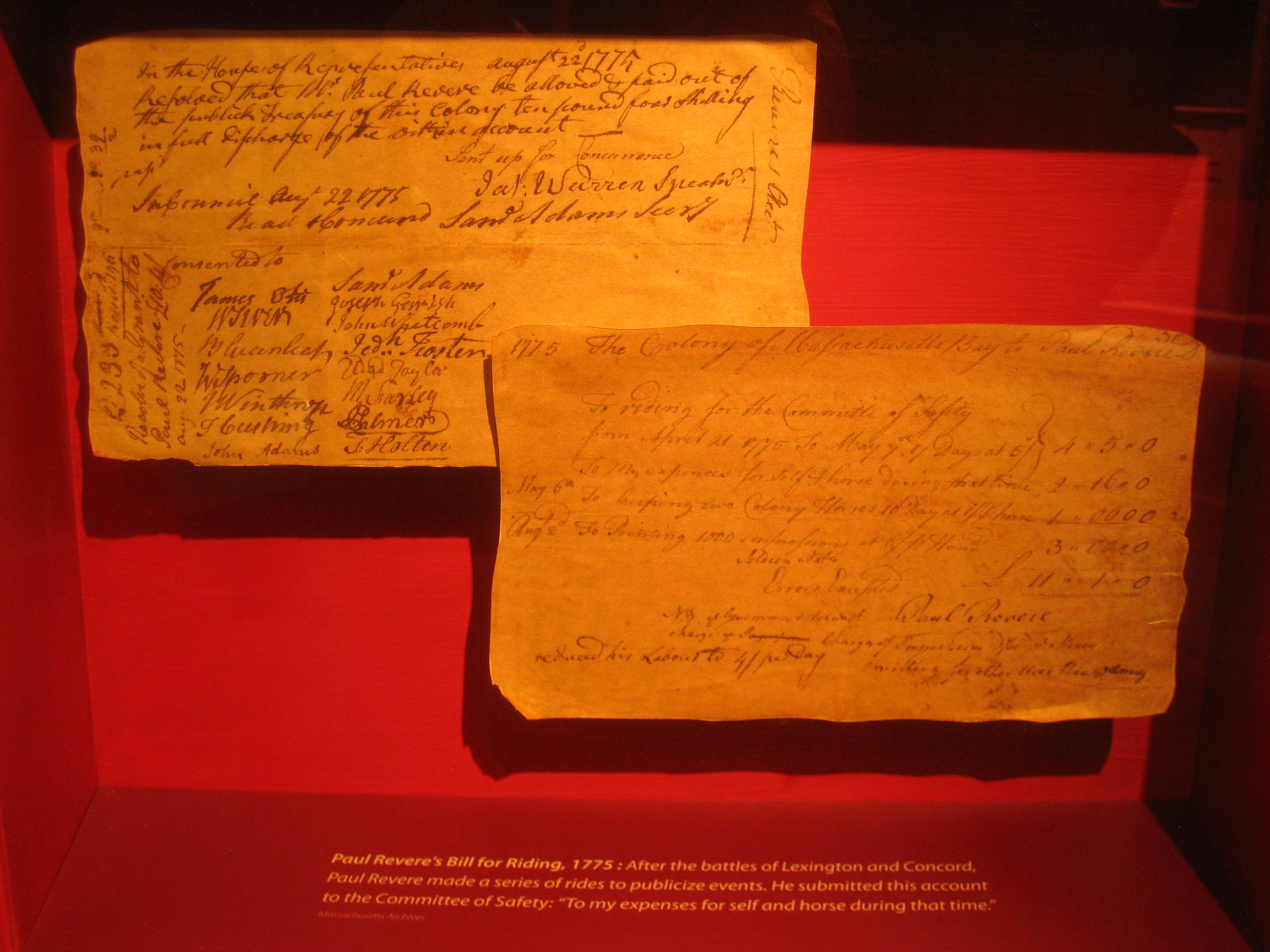
Paul Revere's bill for riding, 1775

As of 2010, the archives' voluminous holdings range throughout the history of Massachusetts:

- Records reflecting the structure of Massachusetts state government:
  - "Foundation documents: Colonial charters, treaties, compacts, and agreements with Indian tribes and with other states. Proceedings of state constitutional conventions. Constitution of 1780 and amendments. State legal codes."
  - "Legislative records: Files of the colonial General Court (1629-1780), the Provincial Congress (1774-1775), and the state General Court (1780-present): Petitions, orders, reports, messages, bills. Unenacted legislation and enacted statutes and resolves. House and Senate dockets, roll calls, and journals. Committee and legislative commission hearing and background files."
  - "State secretary records: Administrative files; initiative and referendum petitions; state and national election returns; state regulation files and register; lobbyist registrations; municipal home rule charters and acceptances of local option statutes; notices of appointment, lists, and qualifications (oaths of office) of state and local officials; census registers and returns; ... returns of names changed in probate court. Corporate articles of organization (prior to 1851 see legislative records)."
  - Executive records: Governor (1802–present); Council; Administration and Finance; Consumer Affairs and Business Regulation; Economic Development and Manpower Affairs/Labor; Education; Environmental Affairs; Health and Human Services; Public Safety/Adjutant General; Transportation and Construction; Treasurer records; Attorney General records; Court records.
- Special colonial and early state materials to 1800:
  - "328-volume Massachusetts Archives Collection which contains colonial, provincial, and Revolutionary records."
  - "The Eastern Lands papers document settlement of public lands in the District of Maine and its separation from Massachusetts as a state in 1820."
  - "Transcripts of the Archives of the Plymouth Colony, 1620-1691. Included are legislative, court, financial, and vital records; deeds and wills."
  - "Documents relating to Indian affairs, including military, trading, and census records. The Archives also holds 19th-century records of the Guardians of Indians."
  - "Witchcraft records: ... depositions, examinations, warrants, and other court documents."
- Other historical resource files:
  - "Massachusetts Historical Commission: compliance files of historic sites and structures in Massachusetts listed in the National Register of Historic Places and related tax certification program files."
  - "Work Projects/Works Progress Administrations' Massachusetts Historical Records Survey (1936-1942), American Portraits Survey, and Black Historical Records Survey."
- Nontextual materials:
  - "Photographs: Senate presidents, House speakers, governors. Activities and buildings of state institutions. Massachusetts boundary markers. Public works and harbor and river projects. Aerial survey mapping; waterworks and sewer construction; parks engineering; reservations and facilities. Boston Harbor dredging and pier construction."
  - "Maps and plans: Eastern Lands (Maine, 17th-18th centuries); early state, national, and continental maps; maps and plans deposited with the state secretary; parks engineering; waterways; state planning land use maps; state aid highway construction maps; town plans (1794, 1830); building inspection plans; mental hospital, correctional facility building plans."
  - "Paintings: New England birds by L.A. Fuertes."
  - "Audio-visuals: Press conferences, public service announcements, hearings, interviews, and public relations materials."
- "Local records: Vital records, charters, valuation lists, the debtors/criminal calendars of the Suffolk County (Charles Street) Jail, case files of the Middlesex County Training School, and files of the Boston Housing Authority."
- "Private records: Personal papers of governors Oliver Ames and Eugene Foss; miscellaneous military documents; architectural plans; and photographs relating to wars and other historical events, and of state officials and institutions."

== See also ==
- Massachusetts Public Records Law
