= John Oliver Gunn Jr. =

American race car driver

John Gunn
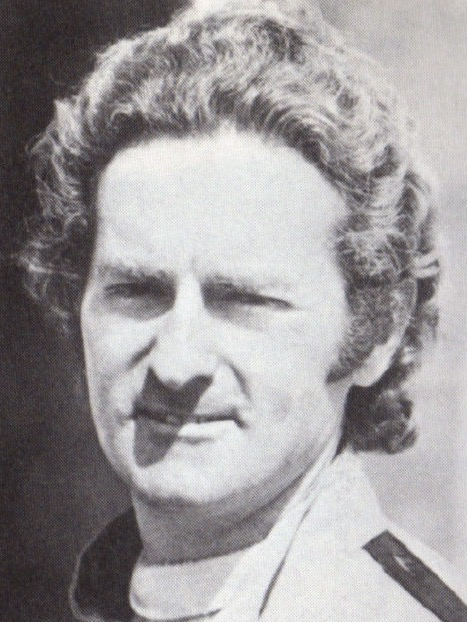
- Gunn in 1973
- Born: July 25, 1939; Yanceyville, North Carolina, U.S.
- Died: July 7, 2010 (aged 70); Palm City, Florida, U.S.
- Known for: Auto racing

John Oliver Gunn Jr. (July 25, 1939 – July 7, 2010), also known as Johnnie, was an American racing driver from Yanceyville, North Carolina.

== Early life ==
After attending Bartlett Yancey High School in his hometown of Yanceyville, Gunn studied mechanical engineering at the University of Miami. His father ran a Ford dealership near the Virginia International Raceway, which gave him access to motor racing early on. He entered his first races during his student days in an Alfa Romeo Giulietta Spider, winning two national sports car championships.

== Racing career ==
Gunn's professional auto racing career began in 1968, which led to participation in Formula A, Can-Am, and IMSA events.

Gunn had his best Formula A seasons in 1970 and 1974. In 1970, he reached seventh place in the final ranking (championship winner John Cannon). Gunn drove a Surtees TS5A with a Chevrolet V8 engine for Fred Opert's team.

Gunn finished the 1974 racing year sixth behind Brian Redman, Mario Andretti, David Hobbs, Eppie Wietzes, and Brett Lunger in the SCCA/USAC F5000 championship. In the Can-Am series, he mainly used Lola racing cars and was fifth in the 1974 championship in the Lola T260. During the 1980s, Gunn frequently raced in the IMSA GT series.

Gunn's greatest success in an international endurance competition was a second-place finish at the 12 Hours of Sebring in 1976.
