= Mic'hael Brooks =

American football player (born 1991)

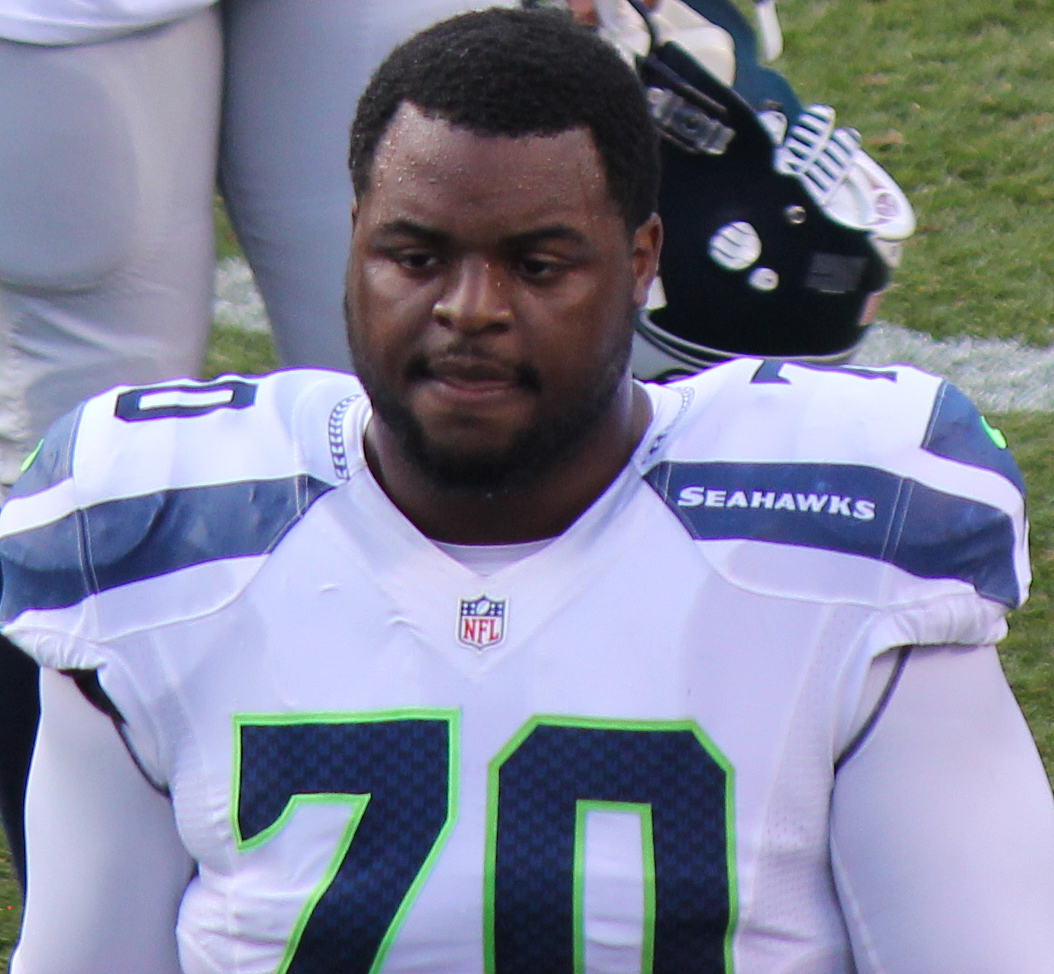
- Brooks with the Seattle Seahawks in 2014

No. 70, 92
- Position: Defensive tackle

Personal information
- Born: August 28, 1991 (age 35); Durham, North Carolina, U.S.
- Listed height: 6 ft 3 in (1.91 m)
- Listed weight: 275 lb (125 kg)

Career information
- High school: Bartlett Yancey (Yanceyville, North Carolina)
- College: East Carolina
- NFL draft: 2013: undrafted

Career history
- Detroit Lions (2013)*; Seattle Seahawks (2013); BC Lions (2015–2017); Saskatchewan Roughriders (2018); Edmonton Eskimos (2019)*
- * Offseason or practice squad member only

Awards and highlights
- Super Bowl champion (XLVIII); CFL West All-Star (2015)

Career NFL statistics
- Total tackles: 1
- Stats at Pro Football Reference
- Stats at CFL.ca

Mic'hael Goubron Brooks (born August 28, 1991) is an American former professional football player who was a defensive tackle in the National Football League (NFL) and Canadian Football League (CFL). He played college football for the East Carolina Pirates. He was a member of the Seattle Seahawks team that won Super Bowl XLVIII. Brooks was also a member of the Detroit Lions, BC Lions, Saskatchewan Roughriders, and Edmonton Eskimos.

== Early life ==
Brooks played high school football at Bartlett Yancey High School in Yanceyville, North Carolina. He recorded 331 total tackles for the Buccaneers. He was a three-year all-region, all-conference, and defensive MVP selection. Brooks earned all-state honors as team captain his senior year after accumulating 94 tackles and 12.5 sacks. He represented North Carolina in the Shrine Bowl of the Carolinas All-Star Game. He was named the Danville Regional Defensive Player-of-the-Year in 2008. Brooks also earned a varsity letter in track and field.

== College career ==
Brooks played in 43 games for the East Carolina Pirates from 2009 to 2012, recording 52 solo tackles and ten sacks. He also earned Conference USA All-Freshman honors.

== Professional career ==
=== Detroit Lions ===
Brooks was signed by the Detroit Lions on May 2, 2013. He was released by the Lions on May 28, 2013.

=== Seattle Seahawks ===
The Seattle Seahawks claimed Brooks off waivers from the Lions on May 29, 2013. He was released by the Seahawks on August 31, 2013, and re-signed on September 2, 2013. He was released by the Seahawks on September 11, 2013, and signed to their practice squad on September 12, 2013. Brooks was signed to the active roster on November 9, 2013. He appeared in a game against the Atlanta Falcons on November 10, recording a tackle. He was released on November 11. Brooks was re-signed to the practice squad on December 19, 2013. Brooks was signed to a futures contract on February 5, 2014. The Seahawks later won Super Bowl XLVIII against the Denver Broncos. The Seahawks waived/injured Brooks on August 26, 2014. He was released by the Seahawks on September 1, 2014.

=== BC Lions ===
Brooks signed with the BC Lions of the Canadian Football League (CFL) on April 30, 2015. In two seasons with the Lions, he appeared in 28 games, accumulating 62 tackles and 4 quarterback sacks. He was named a CFL West All-Star for the 2015 season.

On December 6, 2016, Brooks had a workout with the Minnesota Vikings. On December 14, 2016, he had a workout with the New England Patriots.

Brooks became a free-agent in February 2017. That same month, it was announced that Brooks had re-signed with the Lions for two more seasons, through 2018. In 2017, Brooks played in 15 games and contributed with 21 tackles and one quarterback sack. On May 18, 2018, Brooks was released by the Lions after they were unable to find another team willing to trade for him.

=== Saskatchewan Roughriders ===
On June 24, 2018, Brooks signed with the Saskatchewan Roughriders of the CFL. Brooks played in 11 games for the Riders in 2018, contributing 15 tackles. He suffered a season-ending ankle injury in Week 18 of the season.

=== Edmonton Eskimos ===
Brooks signed with the CFL's Edmonton Eskimos on March 19, 2019. He was released by the club on May 20, 2019.
