= New Albany, Mississippi =

- City
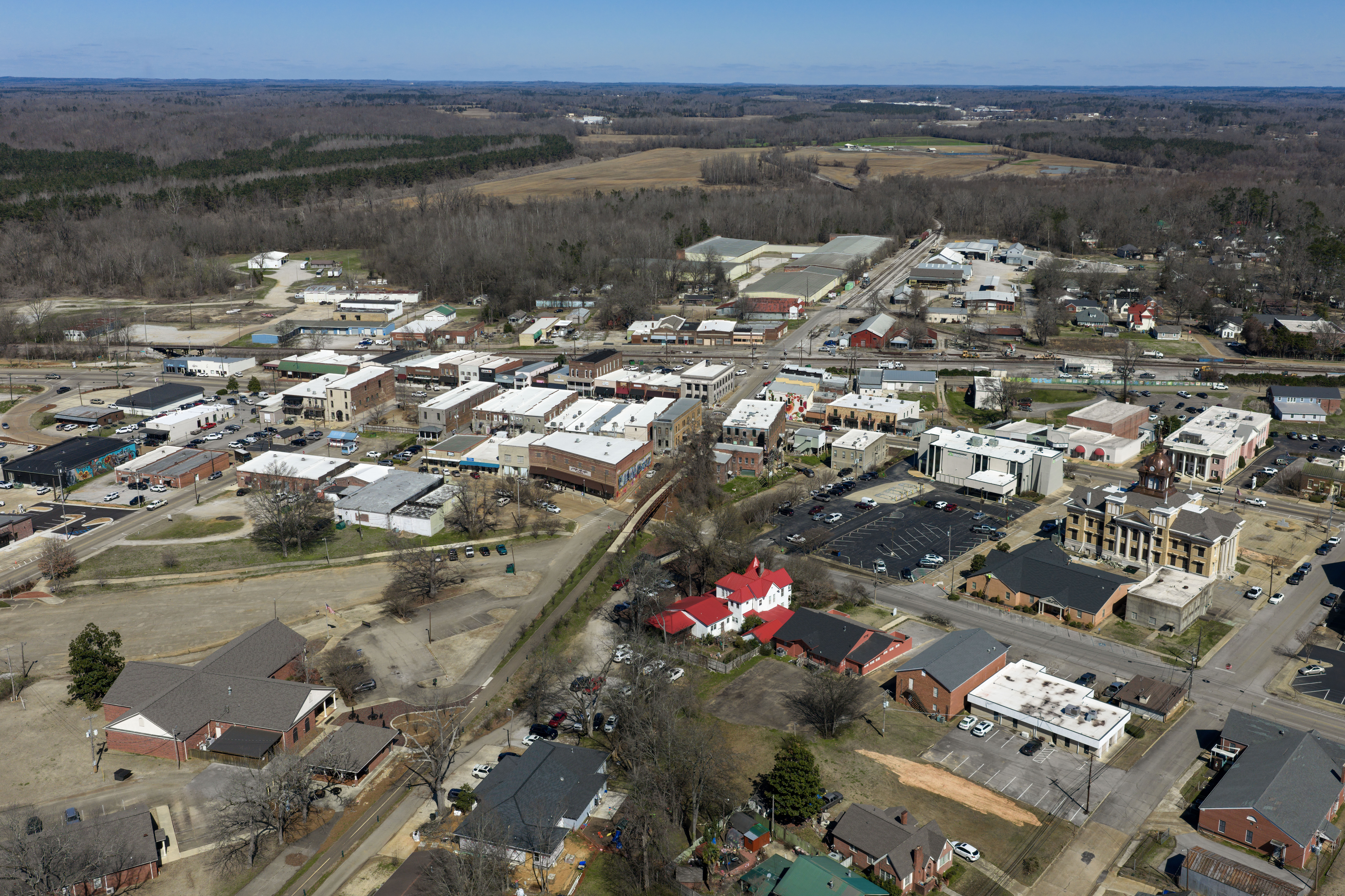
- Nickname: "The Fair and Friendly City"
- Location of New Albany, Mississippi

- Location in the United States
- Coordinates: 34°29′32″N 89°00′34″W
- Country: United States
- State: Mississippi
- County: Union
- Established: 1860

Government
  - Mayor: Jeff Olson (R)

Area
  - Total: 18.28 sq mi (47.35 km^{2})
  - Land: 18.23 sq mi (47.22 km^{2})
  - Water: 0.050 sq mi (0.13 km^{2})
- Elevation: 345 ft (105 m)

Population (2020)
  - Total: 7,626
  - Density: 418.3/sq mi (161.49/km^{2})
- Time zone: UTC-6 (Central (CST))
  - Summer (DST): UTC-5 (CDT)
- ZIP code: 38652
- Area code: 662
- FIPS code: 28-51000
- GNIS feature ID: 2404357
- Website: City website

New Albany is a city in and the county seat of Union County, Mississippi, United States. According to the 2020 United States census, the population was 7,626. It is notable as the birthplace of Nobel Prize-winning author William Faulkner and as the northern gateway to the Tanglefoot Trail.

== History ==
New Albany was founded in 1840 at the site of a grist mill and sawmill on the Tallahatchie River near the intersection of two Chickasaw trade trails. The town developed as a river port and as a regional center for agriculture and commerce.

During the Civil War, the United States Cavalry under Benjamin Grierson passed through New Albany on their way to raid Vicksburg, when they encountered Confederate troops attempting to destroy the bridge over the Tallahatchie. The Confederate troops fled and the bridge was preserved.

Union County was formed from parts of neighboring Pontotoc, and Tippah Counties in 1870, with New Albany designated as county seat. In the late 1880s, two railroads (the Kansas City, Memphis and Birmingham Railroad and the Gulf and Ship Island Railroad) came to New Albany, about the time its population of 600 were rebuilding after a severe fire. In 2013, a section of railroad was paved to become the Tanglefoot Trail, following the path of a rail that was once operated by author William Faulkner's grandfather.

In 1925, L. Q. Ivy, a 17-year-old African American boy, was accused of beating and raping a 21-year old White woman. A crowd of 4,000 gathered in New Albany and despite efforts from the victim's father and US senator Hubert D. Stephens to prevent a lynching, the crowd gained control, torturing and killing Ivy.

== Geography ==
According to the United States Census Bureau, the city has a total area of 17.1 square miles (44 km^{2}), of which 17.0 square miles (44 km^{2}) is land and 0.1 square miles (0.26 km^{2}) (0.35%) is water.

== Demographics ==
Historical population
Census	Pop.	Note	%±
1880	250		—
1890	548		119.2%
1900	1,033		88.5%
1910	2,032		96.7%
1920	2,531		24.6%
1930	3,187		25.9%
1940	3,602		13.0%
1950	3,680		2.2%
1960	5,151		40.0%
1970	6,426		24.8%
1980	7,072		10.1%
1990	6,775		−4.2%
2000	7,607		12.3%
2010	8,034		5.6%
2020	7,626		−5.1%
U.S. Decennial Census

=== 2020 census ===
As of the 2020 census, New Albany had a population of 7,626. The median age was 39.0 years. 24.1% of residents were under the age of 18 and 18.8% were 65 years of age or older. For every 100 females, there were 88.4 males, and for every 100 females age 18 and over, there were 85.9 males.

85.4% of residents lived in urban areas, while 14.6% lived in rural areas.

There were 3,021 households in the city, including 1,911 families. Of all households, 32.7% had children under the age of 18, 41.2% were married-couple households, 19.4% had a male householder and no spouse or partner present, and 34.3% had a female householder and no spouse or partner present. About 31.5% of all households were made up of individuals, and 13.5% had someone living alone who was 65 years of age or older.

There were 3,492 housing units, of which 13.5% were vacant. The homeowner vacancy rate was 1.5%, and the rental vacancy rate was 17.7%.

New Albany Racial Composition
Race	Num.	Perc.
White	4,319	56.64%
Black or African American	2,229	29.23%
Native American	11	0.14%
Asian	69	0.9%
Other/Mixed	276	3.62%
Hispanic or Latino	722	9.47%

=== 2010 census ===
As of the census of 2010, there were 8,526 people, 3,049 households, and 3,027 families residing in the city. The population density was 476.1 inhabitants per square mile (183.8/km^{2}). There were 3,329 housing units at an average density of 195.2 per square mile (75.4/km^{2}). The racial makeup of the city was 63.98% White, 32.98% African American, 0.17% Native American, 0.35% Asian, 1.54% from other races, and 0.97% from two or more races. Hispanic or Latino of any race were 2.83% of the population.

There were 3,049 households, out of which 31.3% had children under the age of 18 living with them, 45.0% were married couples living together, 17.3% had a female householder with no husband present, and 33.5% were non-families. 30.6% of all households were made up of individuals, and 14.3% had someone living alone who was 65 years of age or older. The average household size was 2.42 and the average family size was 3.02.

In the city, the population was spread out, with 26.3% under the age of 18, 8.8% from 18 to 24, 27.1% from 25 to 44, 20.5% from 45 to 64, and 17.4% who were 65 years of age or older. The median age was 36 years. For every 100 females, there were 86.3 males. For every 100 females age 18 and over, there were 78.1 males.

The median income for a household in the city was $28,730, and the median income for a family was $38,750. Males had a median income of $29,457 versus $20,579 for females. The per capita income for the city was $16,507. About 14.7% of families and 18.0% of the population were below the poverty line, including 22.0% of those under age 18 and 23.3% of those age 65 or over.

== Education ==
From its inception until 1964, a segregated school system was maintained, with one set of schools for White students and another for Black students. In 1901, the first school building dedicated entirely to public education was built with 18 classrooms. The only high school in Union County for Black students was Union County Training School in New Albany, which was founded in 1812. Like other schools for African-American students, the Training School was not government funded. In 1964, the school system began a slow process of integrating the races. Elementary schools were integrated first, then higher grades were added. Integration was completed in 1970, and at that time African American students made up 29 percent of the district's students and 20 percent of faculty.

Almost all of the city of New Albany is served by the New Albany School District while small portions are in the Union County School District.

The city is the location of a satellite campus of Northeast Mississippi Community College located at 301 North Street.

The New Albany High School Bulldogs boys basketball team won consecutive state Class 3A titles in 1985, 1986, and 1987. Former NBA player John Stroud coached the 1987 team.

== Infrastructure ==
=== Transportation ===
New Albany is bisected by Interstate 22 (US Highway 78).

New Albany is connected to Ripley in the North and Pontotoc to the South by State Highway 15. Highway 30 connects New Albany and Oxford to the West and Booneville to the Northeast, although when traveling from Oxford towards Booneville an alternate route must be taken within the city limits.

New Albany is served by BNSF Railway (formerly St. Louis – San Francisco Railway) and the Ripley and New Albany Railroad (formerly Gulf, Mobile and Ohio). The two railroads cross downtown. A portion of rail has been paved to become the Tanglefoot Trail, the longest rail-trail in Mississippi.

New Albany was once a stop for Gulf, Mobile and Ohio's famous "Rebel" streamlined passenger train.

The town serves as the northern terminus of the Tanglefoot Trail, a major rail-trail within the state.

== Notable people ==
- Bob Boyd, baseball player
- Jack Carlisle, football coach
- Milt Crain, football player
- Sam Creekmore IV, politician
- Willie Daniel, football player
- William Faulkner, Nobel Prize-winning author
- Marcus Green, football player
- Napoleon Hayes, musician
- Bobby Hogue, politician
- Doc Marshall, baseball player
- Ronnie McNutt, U.S. Army Veteran
- Ethan Paquin, poet
- Steve Patterson, politician
- John Pennebaker, politician
- Estus Pirkle, Baptist minister and filmmaker
- Matthew Prater, musician
- Mike Ratliff, basketball player
- Stephanie Saul, journalist
- Hubert D. Stephens, U.S. senator from Mississippi
- John Stroud, basketball player
- Channing Ward, football player
- Eli Whiteside, catcher and coach for the San Francisco Giants
- Bettie Wilson, woman who lived to 115
- Mike Wilson, politician

== See also ==
- Brices Cross Roads National Battlefield
