= Hawkins Wesley Carter =

American politician (c. 1842–1927)

North Carolina House of Representatives
- In office 1874–1880

North Carolina Senate
- In office 1881–1883

Personal details
- Born: c. 1842
- Died: 1927 (aged 84–85)
- Party: Republican

Hawkins Wesley Carter (c. 1842–1927) was a farmer and state legislator in North Carolina. He lived in Warrenton, North Carolina and was African American. He served in the North Carolina House of Representatives from 1874 to 1880 and in the North Carolina Senate in 1881 and 1883.

== Biography ==
Carter was born in about 1842 to Plummer Carter Hawkins and his wife Amy Hawkins. Having relatively prosperous parents he was educated at home with privately hired teachers.

He was a servant for Company C of North Carolina’s 46th Infantry Regiment, a unit of the Confederate Army, during the American Civil War.

Carter was elected to serve three terms in the North Carolina House of Representatives from 1874 to 1880 including as a member of the House Finance Committee. He was then elected to serve in the North Carolina Senate for two terms from 1881 to 1883 representing Warren County. While in the senate he served on Agriculture, Mechanics and Mining Committee and the Deaf, Dumb and Blind Asylum Committee.

In 1882 Carter was a delegate to the Republican Congressional Convention in Warren County.

His daughter Pattie Hawkins Carter served as superintendent of the Lincoln Hospital School of Nursing and died in 1950.

An application for a soldiers pension in 1927 describes his war duties as constructing breast works, cooking and fighting alongside white soldiers. He stated that he was 87 and can no longer work, however in 1883 he was listed as being aged 40 in the senate records. He had sold his farmland in Warren County and retired at the point.

His will is on record and shows him dying in 1927 and that he had been married to Nannie Boyd (1853–1928) and they had a son Hawkins W. Carter Jr.

== See also ==
- African American officeholders from the end of the Civil War until before 1900
