= Middlesex County Training School =

Former reform school in North Chelmsford, Massachusetts

Coordinates: 42°37′53.66″N 71°22′6.41″W

The Middlesex County Training School is a former reform school located in North Chelmsford, Massachusetts. After its closure, its buildings were purchased by the University of Massachusetts Lowell, which utilized its buildings for its College of Education. Today, the school's records are housed in the Massachusetts Archives.

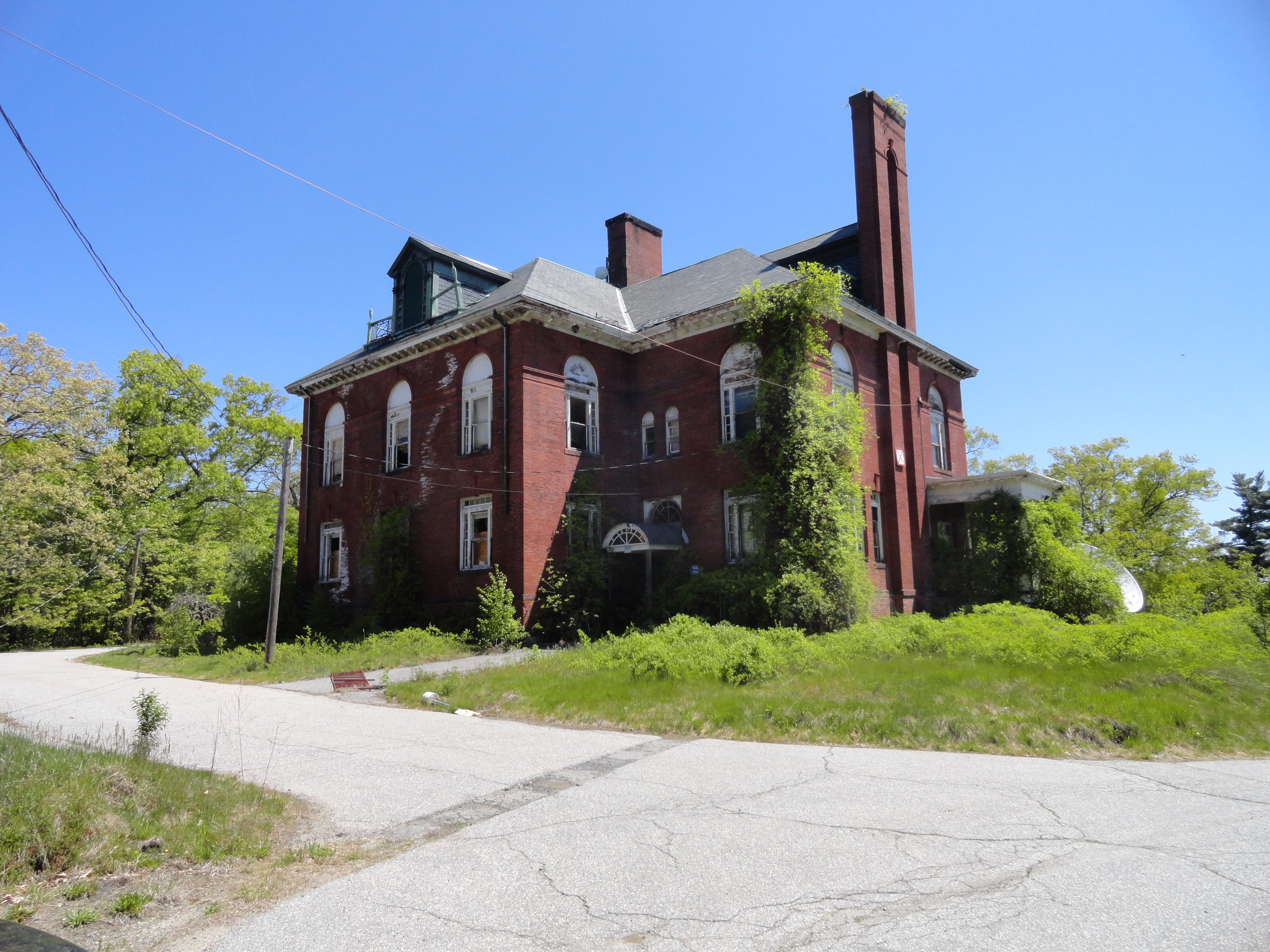
Read Hall, which burned down in 2013

== History ==
One of its buildings was home to the Fay A. Rotenberg School, operated by the Robert F. Kennedy Children's Action Corps, from 1982 until its 2006 relocation to Westborough, Massachusetts. The Rotenberg School (not to be confused with the Judge Rotenberg Educational Center, also in Massachusetts) is "the longest running and currently the only long-term treatment facility for adolescent females in the state".
