= Isaac Alston =

North Carolina state legislator

Isaac Alston (September 15, 1830 – June 4, 1919) was a reverend and state legislator in North Carolina. He represented Warren County, North Carolina in the North Carolina Senate in 1870 and 1891. He lived in Warrenton, North Carolina. He was the only African American elected to the North Carolina Senate in 1890. Three African Americans were elected to the North Carolina House of Representatives that year.

== Early life ==
Isaac Alston was born on September 15, 1830. He married on December 26, 1854.

== Career ==
Alston worked as a farmer. A Baptist, in 1868 he was licensed to preach and was formally ordained in 1871.

On January 9, 1891, Alston introduced a bill to establish an agricultural and mechanical college in North Carolina for African Americans. His measure was quickly rejected, though a similar one introduced by State Senator John D. Bellamy three months later was successful.

== Later life ==
Alston died on June 4, 1919 and was buried in a family plot two days later.

== See also ==
- African American officeholders from the end of the Civil War until before 1900
- List of first African-American U.S. state legislators

== Works cited ==
- Beckel, Deborah (2010). Radical Reform: Interracial Politics in Post-Emancipation North Carolina. University of Virginia Press. ISBN 9780813930527.
- Tomlinson, J. S. (1879). Tar Heel sketch-book. A brief biographical sketch of the life and public acts of the members of the General Assembly of North Carolina. Session of 1879. Raleigh, North Carolina: Raleigh News Steam Book and Job Office – via Internet Archive.
