= Their Highest Potential: An African American School Community in the Segregated South =

1996 book by Vanessa Siddle Walker

- First edition cover
- Author: Vanessa Siddle Walker
- Language: English
- Publisher: University of North Carolina Press
- Publication date: 1996
- ISBN: 0-8078-2276-0 (first edition, hardcover)
- Dewey Decimal: 371.9796756575
- LC Class: LC2802.N8 S53

Their Highest Potential: An African American School Community in the Segregated South is a 1996 non-fiction book about Caswell County Training School in Yanceyville, North Carolina by Vanessa Siddle Walker, published by the University of North Carolina Press. It was written by a former student of the training school and daughter of one of the teachers. Despite the school's poor resources, Walker argued that positive influences happened in the segregated school. Her research came from 100 open-ended interviews with former students, teachers, and parents associated with the school.

== Content ==
Caswell County Training School (CCTS) was an all-Black high school located in Yanceyville, North Carolina, during the years 1934 to 1969. As a former student and the daughter of one of the school's long-serving teachers, Walker approached her research as an endeavor in "historical ethnography", which emphasizes the group's culture and perspectives. While she incorporated some archival materials and other documentation, her primary insights came from a comprehensive series of 100 open-ended interviews with former students, teachers, and parents associated with the school, conducted over six years. Through thematic analysis of these interviews, she identified key themes or "threads" that weaved together her narrative.

The first three chapters of the book explore the connection between the school and the Black community, highlighting the importance of parents as supporters and advocates for the school. Chapters 4–6 make a case for a unique "school ethic" at CCTS, which reflects an educational approach grounded in a collective dedication to students by both the principal and teachers. Walker stated, "Although Black schools were indeed commonly lacking in facilities and funding, some evidence suggests that the environment of the segregated school had affective traits, institutional policies, and community support that helped Black children learn in spite of the neglect their schools received from White school boards."

== Reception ==
Clarence L. Mohr of The American Journal of Education said, "Whatever her intention, Walker has written a book that is likely to be welcomed by Black and other minority educators and elected officials who favor the creation of racially monolithic learning environments." Michael Fultz, writing for History of Education Quarterly wrote, "Walker has crafted an interesting argument: namely, that 'to remember segregated schools largely by recalling only their poor resources presents a historically inaccurate picture.'" Eric R. Jackson of Educational Studies said that despite the book's strengths, it has multiple weaknesses such as the "lack of definitions for many qualitive terms" and "the lack of quantitative evidence used to assess the accomplishments and achievements of the students that attended the school".
