= Union County Training School =

Historically black school in New Albany, Mississippi

Coordinates: 34.4849°N 89.0063°W

The Union County Training School was the only school for African-American children in Union County, Mississippi. The school was founded in 1912 in a donated house in New Albany known as the Baker home. The school initially served students through the 8th grade. It burned in 1943, and classes were held in the gymnasium, which had been built in 1935, and the home economics building, which had been built in 1936. In 1948, a new building designed by Robert McKnight of Tupelo in the Streamline Moderne style was built in the same location. The new school was named after Benjamin F. Ford, who had served as the principal from 1921 until his death in 1950. It remained a segregated Black-only school until around 1967.

From 1971 until 2000, when the Sam T. Barkley School opened, the school served as an integrated elementary school. After Barkley opened, the building was used by Head Start and the Boys and Girls Club. In 2022 the B. F. Ford multicultural exhibit opened in the old school.
