= John Pennebaker =

American lawyer and politician

John David Pennebaker (August 31, 1943 – March 9, 2016) was an American lawyer and politician.

Born in Biloxi, Mississippi, Pennebaker served in the Mississippi National Guard with the rank of staff sergeant. Pennebaker received his bachelor's degree in political science from Mississippi State University and his law degree from University of Mississippi School of Law. He practiced law in New Albany, Mississippi. Pennebaker served as mayor of New Albany from 1969 to 1975. From 1976 to 1992, Pennebaker served in the Mississippi House of Representatives and was a Democrat. Pennebaker helped expand the Mississippi highway system while serving in the Mississippi Legislature. He died at a hospital in Tupelo, Mississippi.
