= China Grove Methodist Church =

Historic church in Mississippi, United States

- U.S. National Register of Historic Places
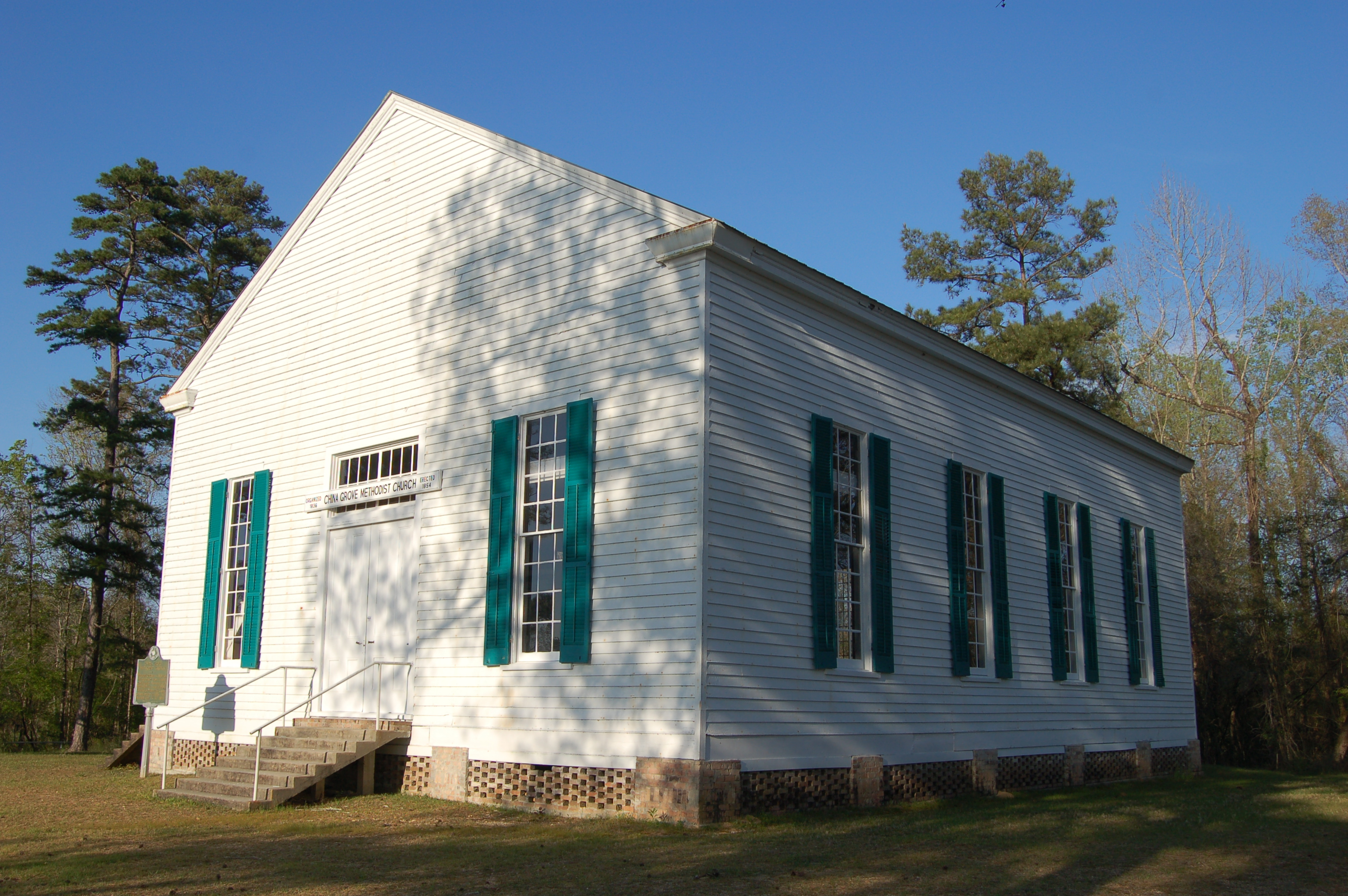
- Front and north side of the church in 2018

- Location within Mississippi Location within the United States
- Nearest city: Tylertown, Mississippi
- Coordinates: 31°12′33″N 90°3′28″W
- Area: 6.2 acres (2.5 ha)
- Built: 1861
- Architectural style: Greek Revival
- NRHP reference No.: 84002350
- Added to NRHP: 5 July 1984

China Grove Methodist Church is a historic church near Tylertown, Mississippi.

== Description and history ==
The church was built in 1861 in the Greek Revival architectural style. The simple wood-frame building sits on brick piers with brickwork between the piers. The east facing gable end facade has a central double door with a multi–pane transom. Two double hung sash twelve over twelve windows with shutters flank the door. Fenestration on the north side is similar with four symmetrically placed windows. The south side has an additional bay with a single molded door leading to the slave gallery. Wall covering on all sides is lap siding with an unmolded base.

The China Grove Methodist Church is the second church built on the property. The first was a log Baptist church. The church is a rare remaining example of churches built before the American Civil War in Mississippi and has a slave gallery. The building is the last remainder of the China Grove settlement established c. 1815. The property was added to the National Register of Historic Places in 1984.

== See also ==
- Methodism
- National Register of Historic Places listings in Walthall County, Mississippi
