= Princess Anne County Training School =

Union Kempsville High School

Location
- Witchduck Road; Virginia Beach, Virginia; U.S.
- Coordinates: 36.8434857°N 76.160741°W

Information
- Former name: Princess Anne County Training School
- Type: Public
- Established: 1938
- Closed: 1969
- Grades: K-12

Princess Anne County Training School was the first and only high school for black students in Princess Anne County, Virginia.

== History ==
Prior to 1938, there was no high school in Princess Anne County that would accept black students. Black children who wanted an education past 7th grade had to travel outside the county, to Booker T. Washington in Norfolk, and pay tuition of $50 per semester. In 1925, the black community mobilized to build a high school for their children. They raised $1200 for land, and in 1934 turned the land plus an additional $2000 over to the Princess Anne County School Board. In 1936 Federal grants completed the funding, and in 1937 the cornerstone for the new school was laid. In 1938, Princess Anne County Training School opened in a new building on Witchduck Road in Virginia Beach utilizing an industrial education curriculum. The term Training School was used, as it was presumed that blacks could not be educated, merely trained as laborers. Over time, the black community repudiated the term training school, and changed the name to Union Kempsville High School in 1961. When the public schools were integrated in 1969, Union Kempsville was closed.
