= A. Oveta Fuller =

American microbiologist

- Born: August 31, 1955; Mebane, North Carolina, U.S.
- Died: November 18, 2022 (aged 67)
- Education: University of North Carolina, Chapel Hill; University of Chicago
- Occupations: Associate Professor of Microbiology and Immunology
- Employer: University of Michigan Medical School

Almyra Oveta Fuller (August 31, 1955 – November 18, 2022) was an associate professor of microbiology and immunology at University of Michigan Medical School. She served as the director of the African Studies Center (ASC), faculty in the ASC STEM Initiative at the University of Michigan (U-M) and an adjunct professor at Payne Theological Seminary. Fuller was a virologist and specialized in research of Herpes simplex virus, as well as HIV/AIDS. She fought hard to dispel the myths surrounding HIV and COVID-19. Fuller and her research team discovered a B5 receptor, advancing the understanding of Herpes simplex virus and the cells it attacks.

== Early life and education ==
Fuller was born on August 31, 1955, in Mebane, North Carolina. Deborah Woods Fuller, her mother, was a teacher and her father Herbert R. Fuller managed the family farm. Fuller grew up near Yanceyville, North Carolina. As a child, biology intrigued her at an early age. She was amazed how her grandmother recovered quickly from being bitten by a water moccasin after receiving antivenin, which was an antidote for snake venom. Although her grandmother's snake bite contribute to her appreciation for biology, there were also two notable biology teachers, Ms. Elam and Mr. Majette who inspired her as well. Despite being told by her guidance counselor that she would not succeed, she persevered and attended her top choice school. After graduating from Bartlett Yancey High School, she earned an Aubrey Lee Brooks Scholarship to the University of North Carolina at Chapel Hill, where she received a BA in biology in 1977. Fuller continued her education at the University of North Carolina at Chapel Hill to complete her Ph.D. in microbiology and immunology in 1983.

== Academic career ==
In 1983, Fuller attended the University of Chicago for a postdoctoral fellowship. In 1988, she became an assistant professor in the department of Microbiology and Immunology at University of Michigan Medical School; in 1995, she was promoted to associate professor with tenure. She also served as a faculty associate for the Center for Global Health, STEM Initiative, and African Studies Center at the University of Michigan. She was associate professor of Microbiology and Immunology at the Medical School and faculty in the STEM Initiative of the African Studies at the University of Michigan.

== Research and publications ==
Fuller's research beginning as a postdoctoral fellow and continuing on similar topics, focuses on uncovering the molecular mechanisms of how pathogenic viruses enter and infect cells. Specifically, her lab studies the pathogenesis of herpes and HIV/AIDS viruses. She was interested in understanding the modes of action of viral cellular entry and early infection, such as membrane fusion mechanisms. Her lab is part of a collaborative effort with chemical engineering and human genetic researchers to develop microchip technologies for early, quick, and inexpensive methods of viral infection detection.

Her most cited publications, based on work while a postdoctoral fellow in Spear's laboratory, are:

- Fuller AO, Spear PG. Anti-glycoprotein D antibodies that permit adsorption but block infection by herpes simplex virus 1 prevent virion-cell fusion at the cell surface. Proceedings of the National Academy of Sciences. 1987 Aug 1;84(15):5454-8. According to Google Scholar, cited 321 times
- Fuller aided in the discovery of how a virus lacking gD binds less stably to cells than viruses containing gD.
- Fuller AO, Santos RE, Spear PG. Neutralizing antibodies specific for glycoprotein H of herpes simplex virus permit viral attachment to cells but prevent penetration. Journal of virology. 1989 Aug;63(8):3435-43. According to Google Scholar, cited 251 times

Her most cited publications based on independent work, but on the same topic, are :

- Fuller AO, Lee WC. Herpes simplex virus type 1 entry through a cascade of virus-cell interactions requires different roles of gD and gH in penetration. Journal of virology. 1992 Aug;66(8):5002-12. According to Google Scholar, cited 198 times
- Fuller AO, Lee WC. Herpes simplex virus type 1 entry through a cascade of virus-cell interactions requires different roles of gD and gH in penetration. Journal of virology. 1992 Aug;66(8):5002-12. According to Google Scholar, cited 171 times

== Other activities ==
Fuller worked with the Trusted Messenger Intervention (TMI) program to recruit the help of local religious leaders to address health inequalities with a main focus on HIV/AIDS testing, prevention, and treatment. She successfully implemented this program within communities in Zambia and the US and more recently introduced programs in other countries, including Liberia where the focus has been on preventable diseases such as HIV/AIDS and Ebola virus disease.

Fuller was the pastor at Bethel African Methodist Episocopal Church in Adrian, Michigan. She was the science advisor at the global AME Church and adjunct faculty member at Payne Theological Seminary, teaching a biology course on HIV/AIDS.

Fuller's work in epidemiology allowed her to contribute to the development and approval of vaccinations after the COVID-19 outbreak in 2020.

In 2020 and 2021, she was a member of the Food and Drug Administration vaccine and biological products advisory committee.

== Awards and recognition ==
In 1983, she was awarded the National Technical Association Service Award, Anna Fund Postdoctoral Award, and Thornton Professional Achievement Award. In 1987, she was also awarded the Ford Foundation fellowship and in 1992 she was awarded the NSF Career Advancement Award. Fuller other awards includes the Woman of the Year in Human Relations by the University of Michigan Task Force (1998) her service with the Distinguished Service Award in Microbiology and Ministry from the Missions Society, AME, the Robert Smith Community Service "Humanitarian Award", and her biography was highlighted in "Distinguished African American Scientists of the 20th Century" (Kessler, Kidd, and Morin, Oryx Press, Phoenix, AZ, 1996). In 2012, she received a Fulbright US Scholar Program award. In January 2013, she began nine months of research in the Copperbelt region in Zambia, which her work focused on bringing biomedical information into communities through local religious leaders.

During a sabbatical in 2006, Fuller traveled to several African nations, including Botswana, South Africa and Zambia to help members of the clergy to better understand the science behind HIV and AIDS and how to help educate their congregations on the impact of AIDS impacts in their communities. In 2022, she was awarded the University of Michigan's Regents’ Award for Distinguished Public Service, which recognizes public service activities that relate closely to teaching and research, and reflect professional and academic expertise, as well as the university's Sarah Goddard Power Award, which recognizes individuals who have made significant contributions to the betterment of women through their leadership, scholarship or other ways in their professional life.

Now her legacy continues on to support other women with the A. Ovetta Fuller Award, which supports up and coming scholars who have dedicate themselves to making progress in fields of health disparities, infectious disease, or microbiology and immunology.
