= Vanessa Siddle Walker =

American educationalist

- Title: Samuel Candler Dobbs Professor of African American Educational Studies

Academic background
- Education: University of North Carolina at Chapel Hill (B.A.); Harvard University (M.Ed., Ed.D.)

Academic work
- Institutions: Emory University

Vanessa Siddle Walker is the Samuel Candler Dobbs Professor of African American Educational Studies at Emory University and was president of the American Educational Research Association (AERA) in 2019–20. Walker has studied the segregation of the American educational system for twenty-five years and published the non-fiction work The Lost Education of Horace Tate: Uncovering the Hidden Heroes Who Fought for Justice in Schools.

== Education ==
In 1976, Walker graduated from Bartlett Yancey High School in Yanceyville, North Carolina. She received her B.A. in education from the University of North Carolina at Chapel Hill, followed by both an M.Ed and Ed.D. from Harvard University.

== Books ==
=== As author ===
- Their Highest Potential: An African American School Community in the Segregated South (University of North Carolina Press, 1996)
- Facing Racism in Education (Harvard Educational Review Reprint Series, 2004)
- (with Ulysses Byas) Hello Professor: A Black Principal and Professional Leadership in the Segregated South (University of North Carolina Press, 2009)
- The Lost Education of Horace Tate: Uncovering the Hidden Heroes Who Fought for Justice in Schools (The New Press, 2020)

=== As editor ===
- (with John R. Snarey) Race-ing Moral Formation (Teachers College Press, 2004)
- (with Sheryl J. Croft and Tiffany D. Pogue) Living the Legacy: Universities and Schools in Collaborative for African American Children (Rowan and Little, 2018)

== Award and honors ==
Walker's awards and honors include:

- Grawmeyer Award for Education
- AERA Early Career Award
- Conference of Southern Graduate Schools
- American Education Studies Association
- Three awards from AERA Divisions, including Best New Female Scholar, Best New Book, and Outstanding Book
- 2019–20 President of the American Educational Research Association

Cultural offices
Preceded by Amy Stuart Wells	President of the American Educational Research Association; 2019–2020	Succeeded by Shaun Harper
