= National Register of Historic Places listings in Lee County, North Carolina =

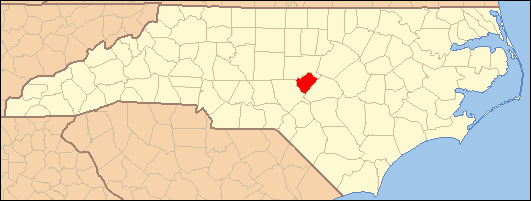

This list includes properties and districts listed on the National Register of Historic Places in Lee County, North Carolina. Click the "Map of all coordinates" link to the right to view an online map of all properties and districts with latitude and longitude coordinates in the table below.

== Current listings ==
This National Park Service list is complete through NPS recent listings posted September 4, 2026.

	Name on the Register	Image	Date listed	Location	City or town	Description
1	Buffalo Presbyterian Church and Cemeteries	Buffalo Presbyterian Church and Cemeteries	February 5, 1999 (#99000090)	1333 Carthage St. 35°27′40″N 79°11′37″W	Sanford	
2	Downtown Sanford Historic District	Downtown Sanford Historic District	September 28, 1985 (#85002561)	Roughly bounded by Gordon St., Horner Blvd., Cole and Chatham Sts.; also roughly bounded by South Horner Blvd, Cole St., Maple Ave., South and North First Sts., Norfolk-Southern Railway tracks, Charlotte Ave., McIver St., North Moore St., Gordon St. 35°28′49″N 79°10′42″W	Sanford	Second set of addresses represent a boundary change approved August 16, 2021
3	East Sanford Historic District	East Sanford Historic District	December 28, 2010 (#10001096)	Bounded roughly by Charlotte Ave., Goldsboro Ave., N. 1st St., S. 2nd St., and S. 8th St. 35°28′48″N 79°10′08″W	Sanford	
4	Endor Iron Furnace		August 13, 1974 (#74001358)	SE of Cumnock; 35°33′01″N 79°13′28″W	Cumnock	
5	Euphronia Presbyterian Church	Euphronia Presbyterian Church	May 26, 1994 (#94000527)	3800 Steel Bridge Rd. 35°28′17″N 79°20′51″W	Sanford	
6	Farish-Lambeth House		March 1, 2002 (#02000111)	6308 Deep River Rd. 35°36′52″N 79°07′00″W	Sanford	
7	Obediah Farrar House		August 18, 1993 (#93000728)	9910 Barringer Rd. 35°36′07″N 79°04′27″W	Haywood	
8	Former Sanford High School	Former Sanford High School	November 29, 1995 (#95001400)	507 N. Steele St. 35°29′08″N 79°11′04″W	Sanford	
9	Harrington's School		September 8, 2026 (#100013401)	6383 Carbonton Road; 35°30′54″N 79°19′26″W	Sanford vicinity	
10	Hawkins Avenue Historic District	Hawkins Avenue Historic District	July 5, 2000 (#00000771)	Roughly bounded by Hill Ave., First St., Charlotte Ave., and Horner Blvd. 35°29′10″N 79°10′50″W	Sanford	
11	Lee Avenue Historic District	Lee Avenue Historic District	September 6, 2002 (#02000944)	Roughly along Lee Avenue, W. Main St., S. Academy St., and W. Raleigh St. 35°27′19″N 79°09′12″W	Sanford	
12	Lee County Courthouse	Lee County Courthouse	May 10, 1979 (#79001729)	Horner Blvd., between Courtland and McIntosh Sts. 35°28′01″N 79°09′49″W	Sanford	
13	Lee County Training School	Lee County Training School	December 28, 2000 (#00001551)	806 S. Vance St. 35°28′25″N 79°10′58″W	Sanford	
14	John D. McIver Farm	John D. McIver Farm	August 18, 1993 (#93000729)	2007 Windmill Dr. 35°29′38″N 79°12′30″W	Sanford	
15	Railroad House	Railroad House	January 29, 1973 (#73001355)	Carthage St. at Hawkins Ave. 35°28′50″N 79°10′39″W	Sanford	
16	Rosemount-McIver Park Historic District	Rosemount-McIver Park Historic District	March 21, 1997 (#97000255)	Roughly bounded by N. Horner Blvd., N. Vance and Carthage Sts. 35°28′50″N 79°11′09″W	Sanford	
17	Sanford Tobacco Company Redrying Plant and Warehouse		August 27, 2019 (#100004323)	521 Wicker St. 35°28′35″N 79°11′01″W	Sanford	
18	Seaboard Milling Company	Seaboard Milling Company	May 2, 2002 (#02000440)	202 Hickory Ave. 35°28′41″N 79°10′22″W	Sanford	
19	Temple Theatre	Temple Theatre	September 8, 1983 (#83001895)	120 Carthage St. 35°28′52″N 79°10′44″W	Sanford	

== See also ==
- National Register of Historic Places listings in North Carolina
- List of National Historic Landmarks in North Carolina
