= The Sanford Herald =

Newspaper in Sanford, North Carolina

Coordinates: 35.48099°N 79.18057°W

- April 15, 2012 front page
- Type: Daily newspaper
- Format: Broadsheet
- Owner: Paxton Media Group
- Publisher: Jeff Ayers
- Editor: Mark Rogers
- Founded: 1930
- Headquarters: 208 St. Clair Court; Sanford, North Carolina 27331; United States
- Circulation: 10,936 Tuesday-Sunday, 2002
- ISSN: 1067-179X
- OCLC number: 13264829
- Website: sanfordherald.com

The Sanford Herald is a newspaper published Tuesdays through Saturdays in Sanford, North Carolina. The Sanford Herald has a daily circulation of just over 9,000 and is published Tuesday through Saturday, and has published continuously since 1930. The Herald is a member of the Audit Bureau of Circulations and the North Carolina Press Association. It is published by the Paxton Media Group of Paducah, Kentucky. The paper announced on Dec. 8, 2019 that it would stop publishing a Sunday edition as of Jan. 7, 2020.

== History ==
The Sanford Herald was preceded by The Sanford Journal (1926–1930).

Past publishers include W.E. Horner Sr. (Founder and Publisher Emeritus), William E. Horner Jr. (1991–98) and Bill Horner III (1998–2016). Current publisher is Jeff Ayers. The current editor is F.T. Norton.

=== Past Editors ===
- Robert W. Mason (1933–34, 1952–57)
- James R. McIver (1934-1949)
- Draughn H. Miller (1949–50)
- Walter H. Paramore (1951)
- Francis Church (1951–52)
- Charles McWilliams (1957–58)
- Charles Presslar (1958–60, 1964–73)
- Walter Alexander McNeil (1960–64)
- William C. Hodges (1973–1992)
- Cornelia Olive
- Jay Thwaite
- Dan Fields (2004–2007)
- Billy Liggett (2007–2011)
- R.V. Hight (2011–2014)
- Thomas Jensen (2014–2016)
- Shawn Stinson (2016–2017)
- G. Chambers Williams III (2017)
- Logan Martinez (2017–2019)
- F.T. Norton (2019–2021)
- Mark Rogers (2021–)

=== Redesign ===
In August 2007, The Herald launched a redesign of its newspaper with the intent on better highlighting local content and adding cosmetic improvements. The redesign included more local coverage in its news section and the addition of a daily features section titled "Carolina." The redesign coincided with the newspaper's switch from using Quark XPress design software to Adobe InDesign.

=== Pay Wall ===
On August 24, 2010, The Herald instituted a pay wall on its website. As of that date, no one could read the stories, archives and most of the other content without subscribing. Online-only subscriptions were offered at $2 per day or $16 per month. Customers with home delivery of the print edition had full access to the website for no additional charge.

=== Awards ===
The Sanford Herald won the North Carolina Press Association's highest honor, General Excellence, for its division for three consecutive years between 2010 and 2012.

In 2012, The Sanford Herald won 17 North Carolina Press Association Awards in Division D including first in:

- Best Video
- Best Niche Publication
- Best Color Home Furnishings and Appliances Ad
- Best Color Apparel, Jewelry and Accessories Ad
- Best Use of Humor in an Ad

In 2011, The Sanford Herald won 30 North Carolina Press Association Awards in Division D including first in

- General News Reporting
- Deadline News Reporting
- Online Breaking News
- Education Reporting
- News Enterprise Reporting
- Sports Feature Writing
- General News Photography
- Sports Photography
- Multimedia Project
- Headline Writing
- General Excellence for Websites
- Appearance and Design
- News Section Design
- Special Section
- Best Niche Publication
- General Excellence for Newspapers

In 2010, The Sanford Herald won 25 North Carolina Press Association Awards in Division D including first in

- General News Reporting
- Deadline News Reporting
- Education Reporting
- News Enterprise Reporting
- General News Photography
- Photo Illustration
- Best Video
- Criticism
- Appearance and Design

== Content ==
The Herald covers several topics, including local government (Lee County Board of Commissioners, Sanford City Council, Broadway Town Commissioners, Lee County Board of Education), state government (North Carolina General Assembly), education, arts and entertainment, religion, business and crime. The daily news section ranges from 10-16 pages.

The sports section covers the local high schools (Lee County High School, Southern Lee High School), Central Carolina Community College athletics, local golf tournaments, other youth sports, Campbell University athletics and more. Local football coach Jody Stouffer writes a column keeping track of former high school athletes and their college sports achievements.

The Herald utilizes weekly syndicated columns from writers such as George Will, Walter Williams, John Hood, Chris Fitzsimmons, D.G. Martin, Michelle Singletary and more. The editorial page also features local editorials and columns and editorial cartoons.

The Herald's social media footprint includes a Facebook, Twitter and Instagram. Reporters will also often run their own individual social media accounts, reporting on the news of the day and live-tweeting from government meetings and other events.

== See also ==
- List of newspapers in North Carolina
