= WDCC (FM) =

- Sanford, North Carolina; United States
- Broadcast area: Sanford area
- Frequency: 90.5 MHz
- Branding: "90.5 the Beat"

Programming
- Format: Rhythmic contemporary hit radio

Ownership
- Owner: Central Carolina Community College

History
- First air date: December 1970; 55 years ago
- Call sign meaning: Department of Community Colleges

Technical information
- Licensing authority: FCC
- Facility ID: 9841
- Class: A
- ERP: 2,000 watts
- HAAT: 72.0 meters (236.2 ft)
- Transmitter coordinates: 35°28′19.00″N 79°8′36.00″W

Links
- Public license information: Public file; LMS
- Webcast: Listen live
- Website: www.wdccfm.com

WDCC (90.5 FM) is a college radio station broadcasting a rhythmic contemporary hit radio format. Licensed to Sanford, North Carolina, United States, the station serves the Sanford area. The station is owned by Central Carolina Community College.

== History ==
WDCC is a noncommercial, student-run station. WDCC originally signed on the air in December 1970 at 89.5 MHz and an Effective Radiated Power (ERP) of 35.2 watts. The call letters stand for "We're Department of Community Colleges". The station began operating in conjunction with the Radio-TV Broadcasting Curriculum at Central Carolina Technical Institute, now known as Central Carolina Community College since 1988.

The radio format was a combination of top 40 and country music, since it was an instructional facility to teach students to be professional announcers and be skilled at playing a variety of radio formats and also to gather, write and produce newscasts. News was read via Associated Press Teletype at :55 past the hour and news briefs given at the bottom of the hour. A full 30-minute newscast was produced daily from 12-12:30 pm. Weather and Sports updates were given at :15 and :45 past the hour, respectively. The first station manager was Jerry M. Farmer from 1970-1997. Farmer was hired by CCTI after having worked for 10 years at WEYE in Sanford as their Station Manager and Morning Personality. Farmer's graduates are many, not only working in North Carolina, but around the United States.

In June 1982 the station changed frequency to 90.5 MHz and raised power to 3,000 watts ERP. In the spring of 1997, Jerry Farmer retired from CCCC. On December 23, 2013, Jerry Farmer died at the age of 78. In the fall of 1997, Bill Freeman became the station manager and continues to hold that position. Freeman continues to place graduates at stations in North Carolina and around the United States. The CCCC Broadcast Production Technology program, known by that title since 1997, continues the tradition of being a leader in training students for the broadcasting industry. Under the guidance of WDCC Chief Engineer, Dr. Jim Davis and his associates, WDCC now operates 24/7, serving the citizens of Lee and surrounding counties with music and information.

As of June 2008, WDCC offers a local public affairs program entitled "The Rant" in cooperation with the Sanford Herald. Billy Liggett, Sanford Herald Editor, along with co-hosts, Jonathan Owens and Gordon Anderson, who also work for the Sanford Herald, meet each Wednesday morning to discuss local issues on the radio. The Rant was pulled from WDCC on April 5, 2013, due to a conflict with a local Republican politician. Students and faculty manage the station in conjunction with the Broadcast Production Technology curriculum of CCCC. In 2008, CCCC, parent company of WDCC, applied for construction permit to raise tower height to 72 meters and move the tower to a location due north of the current tower site. That having been done and proper paperwork submitted to the FCC, on May 20, 2010, WDCC went on the new 72-meter tower to broadcast for the first time, power was adjusted to 2,000 watts, which increased WDCC's coverage in the southeast quadrant of its coverage area for the first time since its first broadcast in December 1970.
