= Lee County Training School =

Historic school building in North Carolina, United States

- U.S. National Register of Historic Places
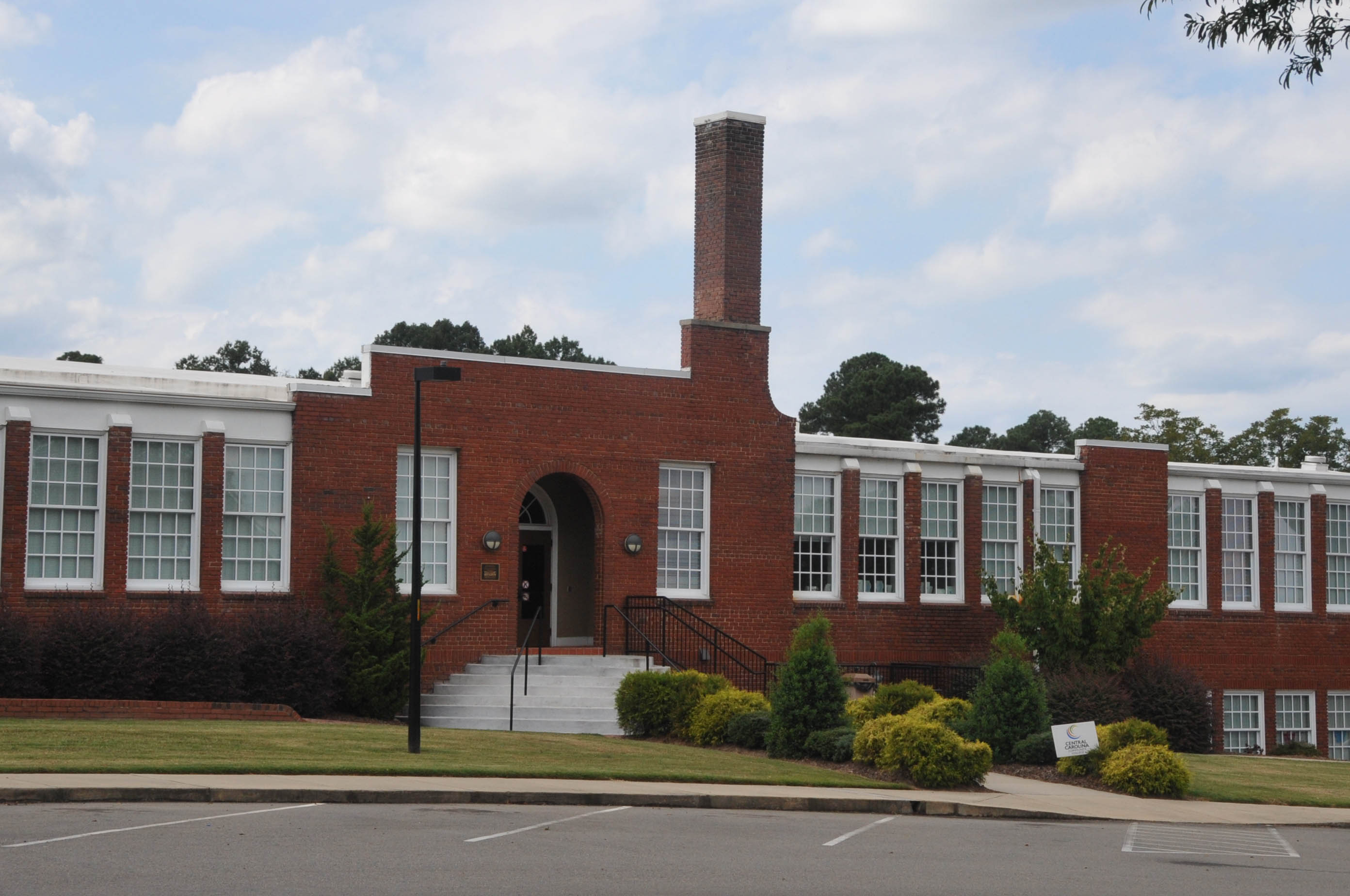
- Lee County Training School, March 2007

- Location within North Carolina Location within the United States
- Location: 806 S. Vance St., Sanford, North Carolina
- Coordinates: 35°28′25″N 79°10′58″W
- Area: 2 acres (0.81 ha)
- Built: 1927
- Built by: Boykin, A. L. "Link"
- MPS: Lee County MPS
- NRHP reference No.: 00001551
- Added to NRHP: December 28, 2000

Lee County Training School, also known as the W. B. Wicker School, is a historic school building located at Sanford, Lee County, North Carolina. It is a one-story brick building dating to 1927 with additions in 1934 and 1949. The building is characterized by large windows alternating with pilasters and was built by contactor A.L. “Link” Boykin, a leading member of Sanford’s black community. Construction funds were provided in part by the Rosenwald Fund, conceived in the 1910s by Southern black leader and educator Booker T. Washington. The Rosenwald schools were built across the south for black Americans in the early 20th century. It served as Sanford and Lee County's African American high school until it was decommissioned as a high school in 1969. Until the year 2019, classes for grade school were last held at the school in the late 1980s. It was listed on the National Register of Historic Places in 2000.

The W. B. Wicker School is one of the oldest educational institutions in Lee County with almost a century of history behind its doors. Under leadership of William Bartelle Wicker, this school allowed African American children a to get an education during the years of segregation, Jim Crow, desegregation and through the late 60s post-segregation era. It was during this time that the school was re-named from Lee County Training School to W.B. Wicker in recognition of William Bartelle Wicker's dedication and perseverance in providing quality education to the students of Lee County.

In 2001, Brick Capital Community Development Corporation (CDC), Lee County, the City of Sanford, and a local community Advisory Group worked together to restore the school. By November 2006, the revitalized school became the W. B. Wicker Business Campus and was home to Central Carolina Community College's Lifelong Learning Center, a four-star childcare center, and the Sanford business suites. From 2006 to 2018, Brick Capital CDC owned and managed the W. B. Wicker Business Campus.

In 2018, Lee County purchased the W. B. Wicker School from Brick Capital CDC in order return it to the Lee County Board of Education and transform it into an elementary STEAM (Science, Technology, Engineering, Arts, Math) school. The school revitalized three historic parts of the Wicker main campus- the main building, auditorium and gymnasium and expanded the school with a new building. With these additions, the school now holds a population of over 900 students.
