= Lick Creek (Cape Fear River tributary) =

Stream in North Carolina, USA

Lick Creek Tributary to Cape Fear River
- Location of Lick Creek Creek mouth Lick Creek (Cape Fear River tributary) (the United States)

Location
- Country: United States
- State: North Carolina
- County: Lee
- City: Sanford

Physical characteristics
- Source: Carrs Creek divide
  - location: east side of Sanford, North Carolina
  - coordinates: 35°27′56″N 079°07′41″W
  - elevation: 430 ft (130 m)
- Mouth: Cape Fear River
  - location: about 0.5 miles southwest of Brickhaven, North Carolina
  - coordinates: 35°33′32″N 079°02′36″W
  - elevation: 152 ft (46 m)
- Length: 10.91 mi (17.56 km)
- Basin size: 48.45 square miles (125.5 km^{2})
- Discharge
  - location: Cape Fear River
  - average: 53.91 cu ft/s (1.527 m^{3}/s) at mouth with Cape Fear River

Basin features
- Progression: Cape Fear River → Atlantic Ocean
- River system: Cape Fear River
- Tributaries
  - left: Wallace Branch; Hughes Creek
  - right: Little Lick Creek; Stony Creek
- Bridges: US 421, Pumping Station Road, San Lee Drive, Lick Creek Road, Lower River Road

Lick Creek is a 10.91 mi (17.56 km) long 4th order tributary to the Cape Fear River in Lee County, North Carolina.

== Course ==
Lick Creek rises in a pond on the east side of Sanford, North Carolina and then flows northeasterly to join the Cape Fear River about 0.5 miles southwest of Brickhaven, North Carolina.

== Watershed ==
Lick Creek drains 48.45 square miles (125.5 km^{2}) of area, receives about 47.6 in/year of precipitation, has a wetness index of 416.65 and is about 63% forested.

== See also ==
- List of rivers of North Carolina
