= Colon, North Carolina =

- Unincorporated community
- Location within North Carolina Location within the United States
- Coordinates: 35°31′37″N 79°09′08″W
- Country: United States
- State: North Carolina
- County: Lee
- Elevation: 318 ft (97 m)
- Time zone: UTC-5 (Eastern (EST))
  - Summer (DST): UTC-4 (EDT)
- GNIS feature ID: 1019743

Colon is an unincorporated community in Lee County, North Carolina, United States. It was also known as Buckner.

Coal from the Egypt Mine used to be delivered to the Seaboard Railroad station here. Gas-fired brick was also made here. A post office was established as "Bucker" in 1891 and was renamed "Colon" in 1892. It is near Sanford and Tramway, North Carolina
