= WWGP =

- Sanford, North Carolina; United States
- Broadcast area: Southern Pines, North Carolina
- Frequency: 1050 kHz
- Branding: Superhits WWGP

Programming
- Format: Oldies
- Affiliations: Motor Racing Network; Performance Racing Network

Ownership
- Owner: Sandhills Broadcasting Group
- Sister stations: WFJA

History
- First air date: 1946; 80 years ago
- Call sign meaning: Walter W. Gregory and Waldo W. Primm (founding owners)

Technical information
- Licensing authority: FCC
- Facility ID: 74181
- Class: D
- Power: 1,000 watts day 161 watts night
- Transmitter coordinates: 35°26′28″N 79°12′54″W
- Translator: 95.1 W236DE (Sanford)

Links
- Public license information: Public file; LMS
- Webcast: Listen live
- Website: wwgpradio.com

WWGP (1050 AM) is a radio station broadcasting an oldies format. Licensed to Sanford, North Carolina, United States, its primary market covers Lee County, Chatham County, Moore County, and Harnett County. The station is currently owned by Sandhills Broadcasting Group and is the AM sister station of WFJA.

== History ==
The station is named for founding partners, Walter W. Gregory, financier, of Rocky Mount, NC, and Waldo W. Primm, manager/engineer, also of Rocky Mount prior to moving back to Sanford, NC. In 1946 they launched Sanford's first radio station, over strong opposition of the local newspaper, which failed to stop the addition of a competitor.

Gregory died not long after WWGP began broadcasting. Primm continued to work to put the station on a sound footing. He sold it after nearly a decade to Frank James Abbott, who in 1994 sold the station to Richard K. Feindel. Feindel died in 2015, and WWGP and WFJA were sold to Sandhills Broadcasting Group, with principal owner Jon Hockaday.

In its early years, Bill Buchanan did the morning show. Bill Cameron worked the afternoon shift. WWGP concentrated heavily on local news. For many years Frank James "Bud" Abbott did local news. He passed the reins to Joan Merritts, who was a graduate of CCTI, now CCCC's Radio TV Broadcasting curriculum. Upon her retirement, Margaret Murchison became news director in 1979, and continued in that role for 30 years. After the noon newscast, Abbott had syndicated columnist Drew Pearson air a five-minute editorial. When Pearson died in 1969, his partner in political crime, Jack Anderson, aired political commentary until his death in 2005. WWGP carried "Paul Harvey News and Comment" at 8:30AM, "Paul Harvey: The Midday Report" at 12:30PM and "Paul Harvey's The Rest of the Story" in the late afternoon. Harvey died in early 2009. WWGP also airs ABC Sports.

The station broadcasts a mix of local and satellite-fed broadcasts. The satellite feeds originate from ABC Radio studios in Dallas, Texas and the station carries the "Today's Best Country" format from ABC. The local live morning show is "The Swap Shop". Callers list items to buy, sell, or trade from 8:00am – 12:00pm Monday through Saturday. The Swap Shop was originally hosted by Blair Cameron, who ran the swap shop at WWGP's cross-town rival station WEYE starting in 1978, before taking the show to WWGP in 1986. The show started as a 30-minute program, which only lasted one day, before growing into a multi-hour show. Cameron was the morning show and swap shop host for ten years, before leaving in 1996. Brian Lee (aka Brian Ek) took the show to a total of 4 hours each day during the week and was the show host for 9 years and wrote a 2019 book, "My Days on the Swap Shop". Steve Gordon performed the show on Saturdays, and took over when Brian Lee left in 2011. Gordon left on August 3, 2012. During the Swap Shop, Margaret Murchison airs local news updates each hour, and WWGP carries news from the "American Information Radio Network" of ABC at the top of each hour.

Primm originally offered free advertising for local merchants not accustomed to using radio marketing. He was ahead of his time, and some merchants continued as paying advertisers.

Logo before translator sign on

On June 1, 2026, WWGP changed their format from country to oldies, branded as "Superhits WWGP".
