= Buffalo Presbyterian Church and Cemeteries =

Historic site in Lee County, North Carolina, US

- U.S. National Register of Historic Places
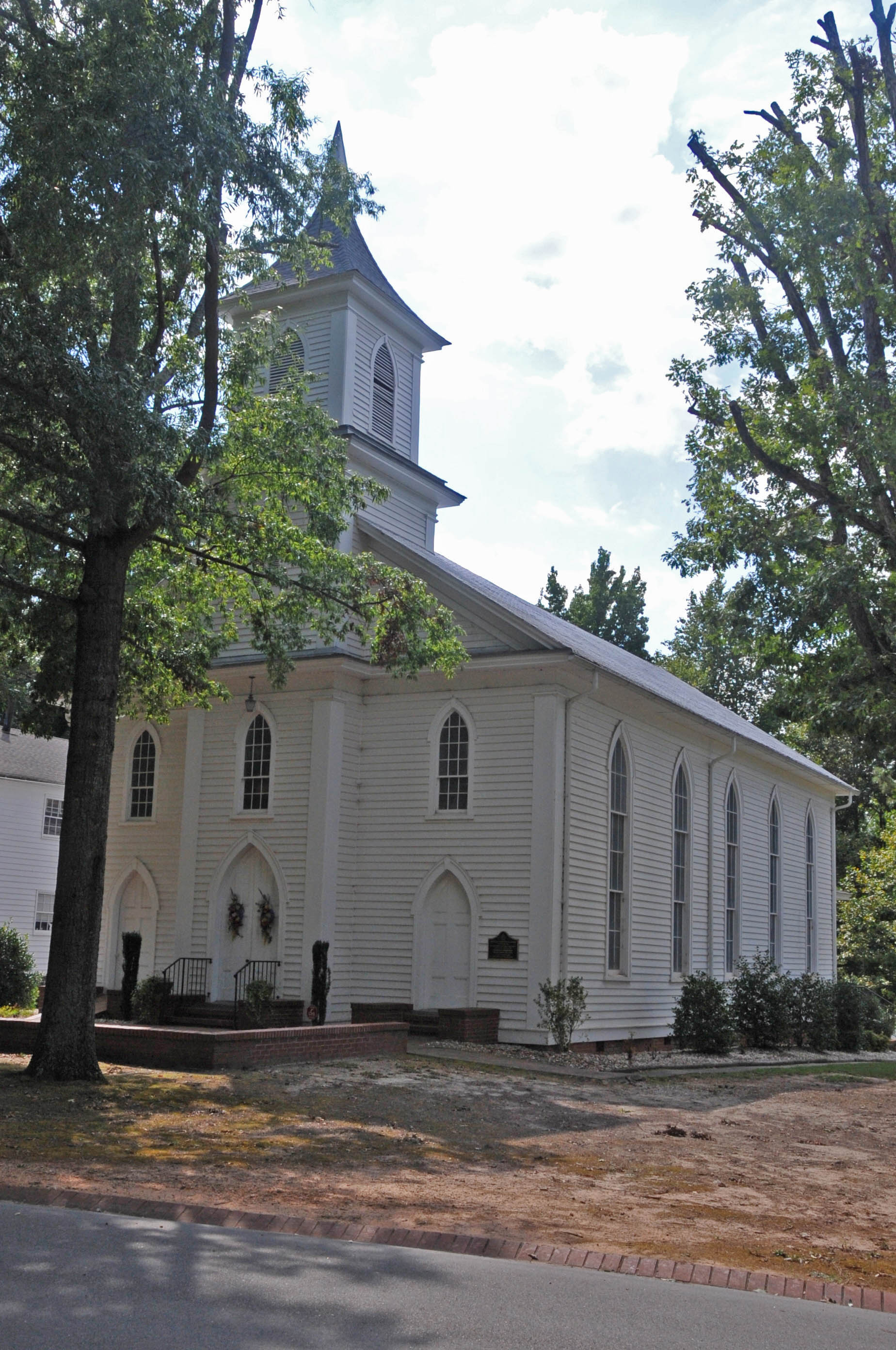
- Buffalo Presbyterian Church, March 2007

- Location within North Carolina Location within the United States
- Location: 1333 Carthage St., Sanford, North Carolina
- Coordinates: 35°27′40″N 79°11′37″W
- Area: 12.8 acres (5.2 ha)
- Built: 1879, 1926
- Built by: John B. Masemore
- Architect: J.J. Minor
- Architectural style: Gothic Revival, Colonial Revival
- MPS: Lee County MPS
- NRHP reference No.: 99000090
- Added to NRHP: February 5, 1999

Buffalo Presbyterian Church and Cemeteries is a historic Presbyterian church and cemeteries located at 1333 Carthage Street in Sanford, Lee County, North Carolina. It was built in 1879, and is a two-story, gable-fronted, Gothic Revival style frame building. The front facade features lancet-arched double-leaf entries, lancet-arched windows, and a three-stage projecting entry tower with a flared, pyramidal roof and finial. Associated with the church is the manse built in 1926. It is a two-story, hip-roofed frame dwelling with Colonial Revival detailing. Also on the property are the original church cemetery, a cemetery for African-American congregants, the Matthews family plot, and the main cemetery. It is the oldest Presbyterian Church in Lee County, Sanford, North Carolina. This is an active congregation of the Presbyterian Church USA.

It was listed on the National Register of Historic Places in 1999.
