= Former Sanford High School =

Historic school building in North Carolina, United States

- U.S. National Register of Historic Places
- U.S. Historic district – Contributing property
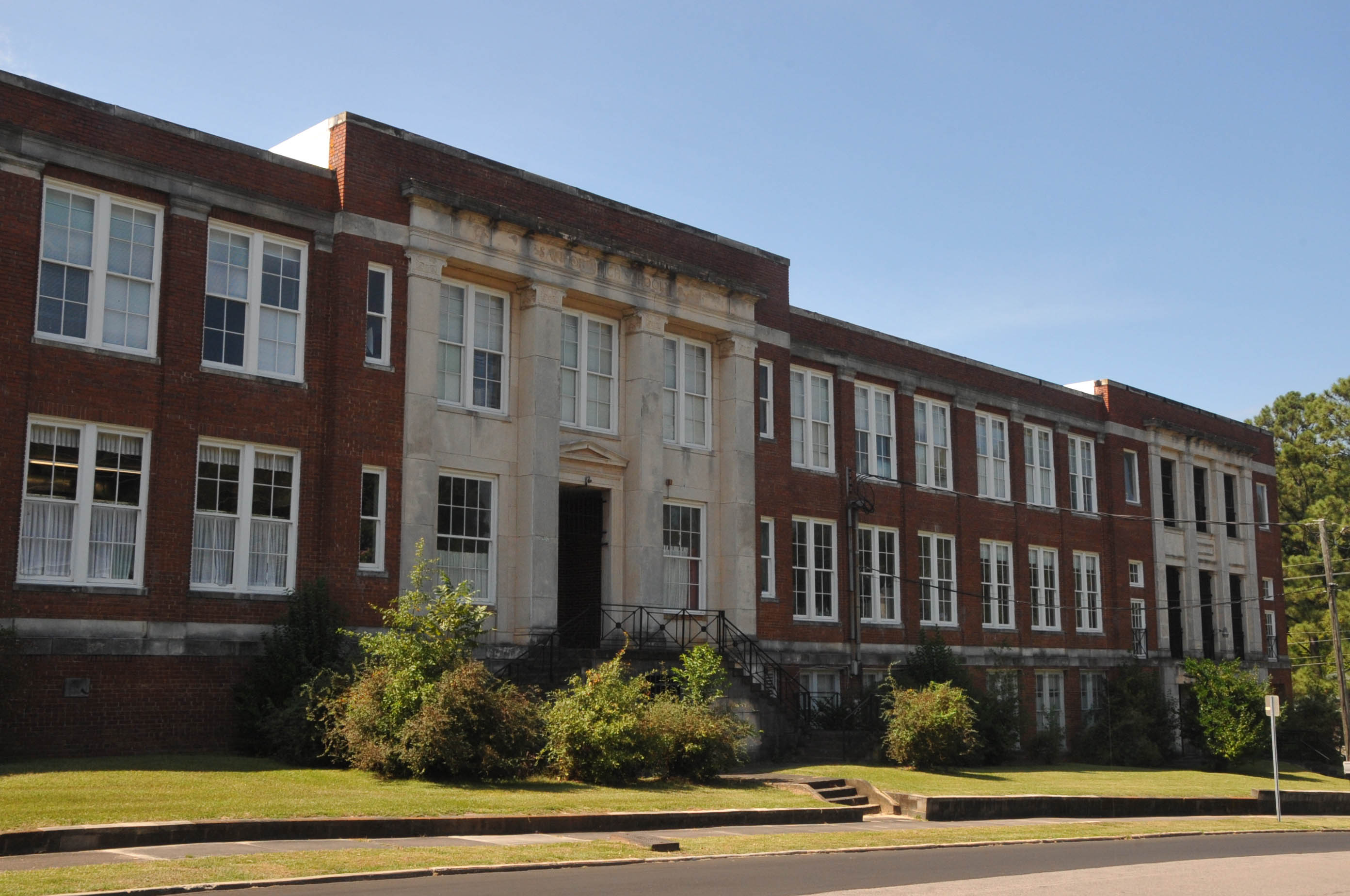
- Sanford High School, Former, March 2007

- Location within North Carolina Location within the United States
- Location: 507 N. Steele St., Sanford, North Carolina
- Coordinates: 35°29′8″N 79°11′4″W
- Area: 3 acres (1.2 ha)
- Built: 1924-1925
- Architect: Wilson, Berryman & Kennedy
- Architectural style: Classical Revival
- MPS: Lee County MPS
- NRHP reference No.: 95001400
- Added to NRHP: November 29, 1995

The former Sanford High School, also known as West Sanford Middle School, is a historic high school building located at Sanford, Lee County, North Carolina. It was designed by the firm of Wilson, Berryman & Kennedy and built in 1924–1925. It is a two-story, L-shaped, Classical Revival-style brick building. The front facade features a slightly projecting center pavilion and terminal pavilions with concrete-faced pilasters with enriched capitals. The building houses the Lee County Art and Community Center.

It was listed on the National Register of Historic Places in 1995. It is located in the Hawkins Avenue Historic District.
