= Seaboard Milling Company =

Historic building in North Carolina, US

- U.S. National Register of Historic Places
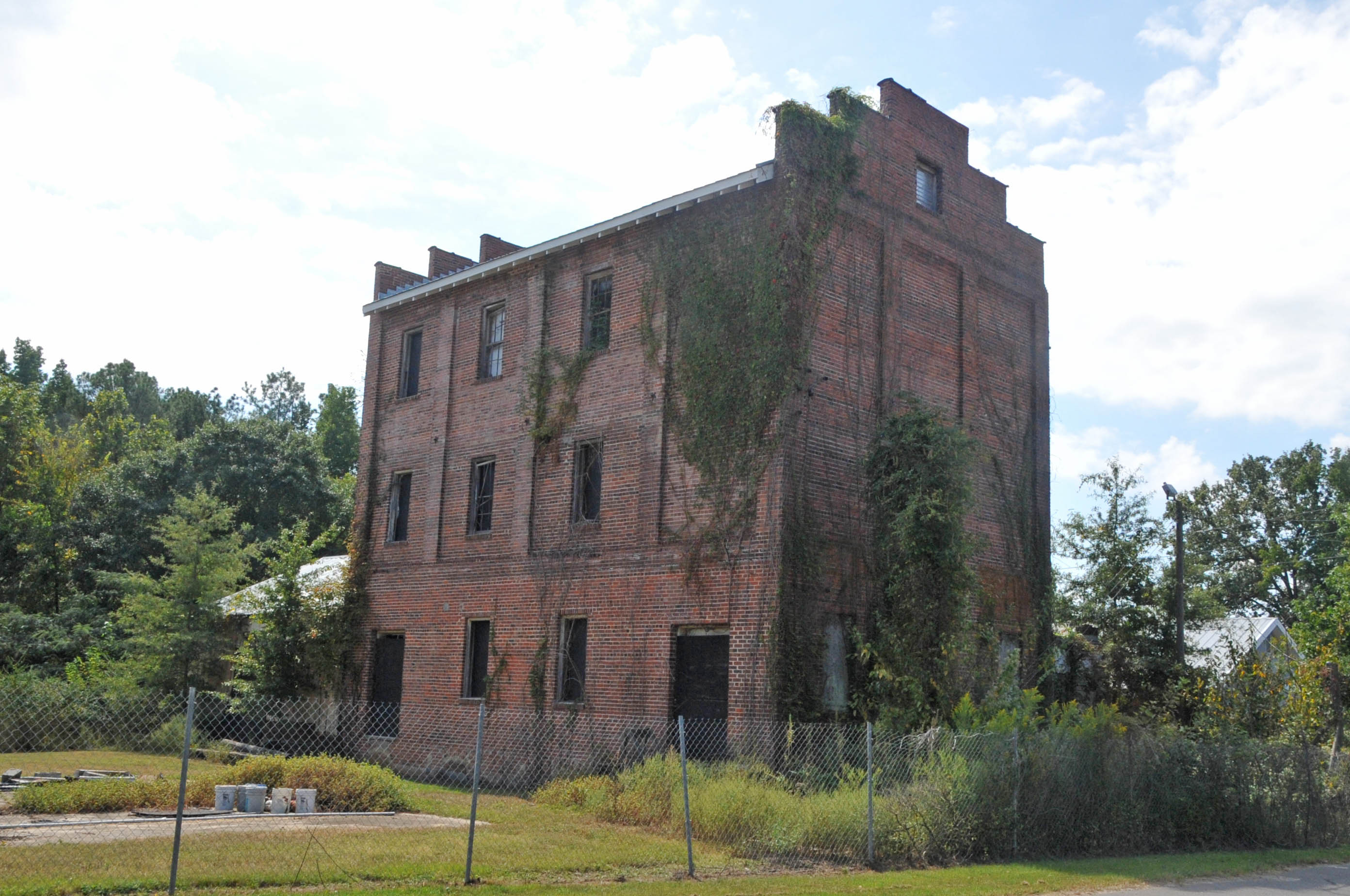
- Seaboard Milling Company, March 2007

- Location within North Carolina Location within the United States
- Location: 202 Hickory Ave., Sanford, North Carolina
- Coordinates: 35°28′41″N 79°10′22″W
- Area: 0.4 acres (0.16 ha)
- Built: 1915-1916
- NRHP reference No.: 02000440
- Added to NRHP: May 2, 2002

Seaboard Milling Company, also known as Seaboard Roller Mill and Broadway Roller Mills, is a historic roller mill located at Sanford, Lee County, North Carolina. It was built in 1915–1916, and is a three-story, brick building with a gable roof with stepped end parapets and traces of decorative exterior painting. It has a one-story metal-sided frame wing erected in two phases about 1920, and a one-story cinder-block office wing from the early 1950s.

It was listed on the National Register of Historic Places in 2002.
