= WFJA =

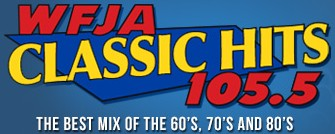
- Sanford, North Carolina; United States
- Frequency: 105.5 MHz
- Branding: Classic Hits 105.5

Programming
- Format: Classic hits
- Affiliations: AP News; Westwood One

Ownership
- Owner: Jon Lane Hockaday; (Sandhills Broadcasting Group LLC)
- Sister stations: WWGP

History
- First air date: 1950 (as WWGP-FM)
- Former call signs: WWGP-FM (1950–1976)
- Call sign meaning: We are Frank James Abbott

Technical information
- Licensing authority: FCC
- Facility ID: 74180
- Class: A
- ERP: 2,300 watts
- HAAT: 148 meters (486 ft)
- Transmitter coordinates: 35°26′34.00″N 79°18′41.00″W

Links
- Public license information: Public file; LMS
- Webcast: Listen Live
- Website: wfjawwgpradio.com

WFJA (105.5 FM) is a classic hits formatted radio station licensed to Sanford, North Carolina, United States. The station is currently owned by Jon Lane Hackaday, through licensee Sandhills Broadcasting Group LLC.
