= East Sanford Historic District =

Historic district in North Carolina, United States

- U.S. National Register of Historic Places
- U.S. Historic district
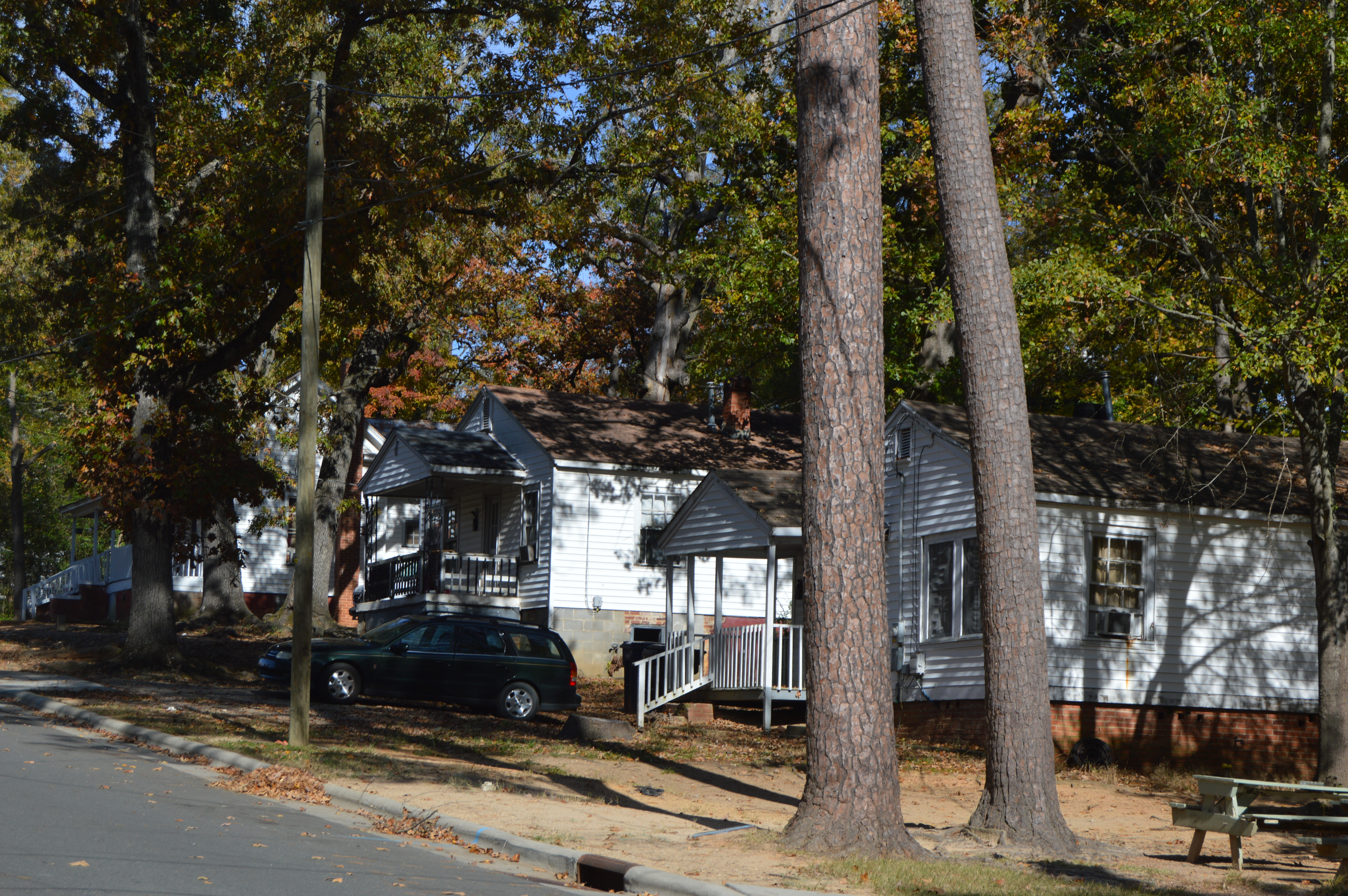
- Houses on Fifth Street north of Maple Avenue

- Location within North Carolina Location within the United States
- Location: Bounded roughly by Charlotte Ave., Goldsboro Ave., N. First St., S. Second St., and S. Eighth St., Sanford, North Carolina
- Coordinates: 35°28′48″N 79°10′8″W
- Area: 68 acres (28 ha)
- Built: 1894
- Built by: Joe W. Stout
- Architect: C.G. Sayre
- Architectural style: Queen Anne, Colonial Revival, Bungalow/craftsman
- MPS: Lee County MPS
- NRHP reference No.: 10001096
- Added to NRHP: December 28, 2010

East Sanford Historic District is a national historic district located at Sanford, Lee County, North Carolina. It encompasses 135 contributing buildings and 1 contributing site in a predominantly residential section of Sanford. The district includes notable examples of Colonial Revival, Queen Anne, and Bungalow / American Craftsman style architecture, with buildings largely dated between 1894 and 1960. Notable buildings include the East Sanford Graded School, Sanford Congregational Christian Church (1904; 1924; 1949), Deaton-Makepeace House (c. 1900), and Sanford Chapel (1940s).

It was listed on the National Register of Historic Places in 2010.
