= Margaret P. Hoke =

First Black librarian in Sanford, North Carolina

- Born: February 12, 1892
- Died: October 16, 1985 (aged 93)
- Known for: first Black librarian in Sanford, North Carolina

Margaret Gertrude Phillips Hoke (February 12, 1892 – October 16, 1985) was the first Black librarian in Sanford, North Carolina, and the namesake of the Margaret P. Hoke branch library, which served the Black community in Sanford from 1936 until integration in 1971.

== Margaret P. Hoke Branch Library ==
The library was originally started by Hoke in 1936, from her home. Hoke originally collected books and magazines from families in the area to build the library.

When the collection outgrew her home, Reverend James E. McMillan helped to relocate it to the back room of Blandonia Presbyterian church, which served the Black community in Sanford, North Carolina.It was referred to as "the little library."

In the early years, the library was operated by the Works Progress Administration (WPA) and Hoke was paid by them until March 1, 1943, when the library started paying her salary.

Hoke was librarian until approximately 1951, when Miss Nancy Crumpton assumed the position.

In November 1952, the library was moved into its official building located on Wall Street in Sanford, North Carolina and it was named the Margaret P. Hoke branch.

In a 1972 interview Hoke described the development of the library, noting that it had become "a nice little library" despite no financial investment. She also described its importance to the local Black community in Sanford stating, "it was a place the Negro people could come and feel at ease."

== Personal life ==
Hoke was born on February 12, 1892. She was married to Ephriam Hoke, who died in 1932, leaving her widowed. Hoke had three children: Helen Hill (née Hoke), Ephriam Washington Hoke Jr., and John Phillip Hoke. Prior to becoming a librarian, Hoke was a music teacher and she continued to give piano lessons after retiring from the library.Hoke passed away on October 16, 1985. She is buried in White Oak Cemetery in Sanford, North Carolina.
