= Lee Avenue Historic District =

Historic district in North Carolina, United States

- U.S. National Register of Historic Places
- U.S. Historic district
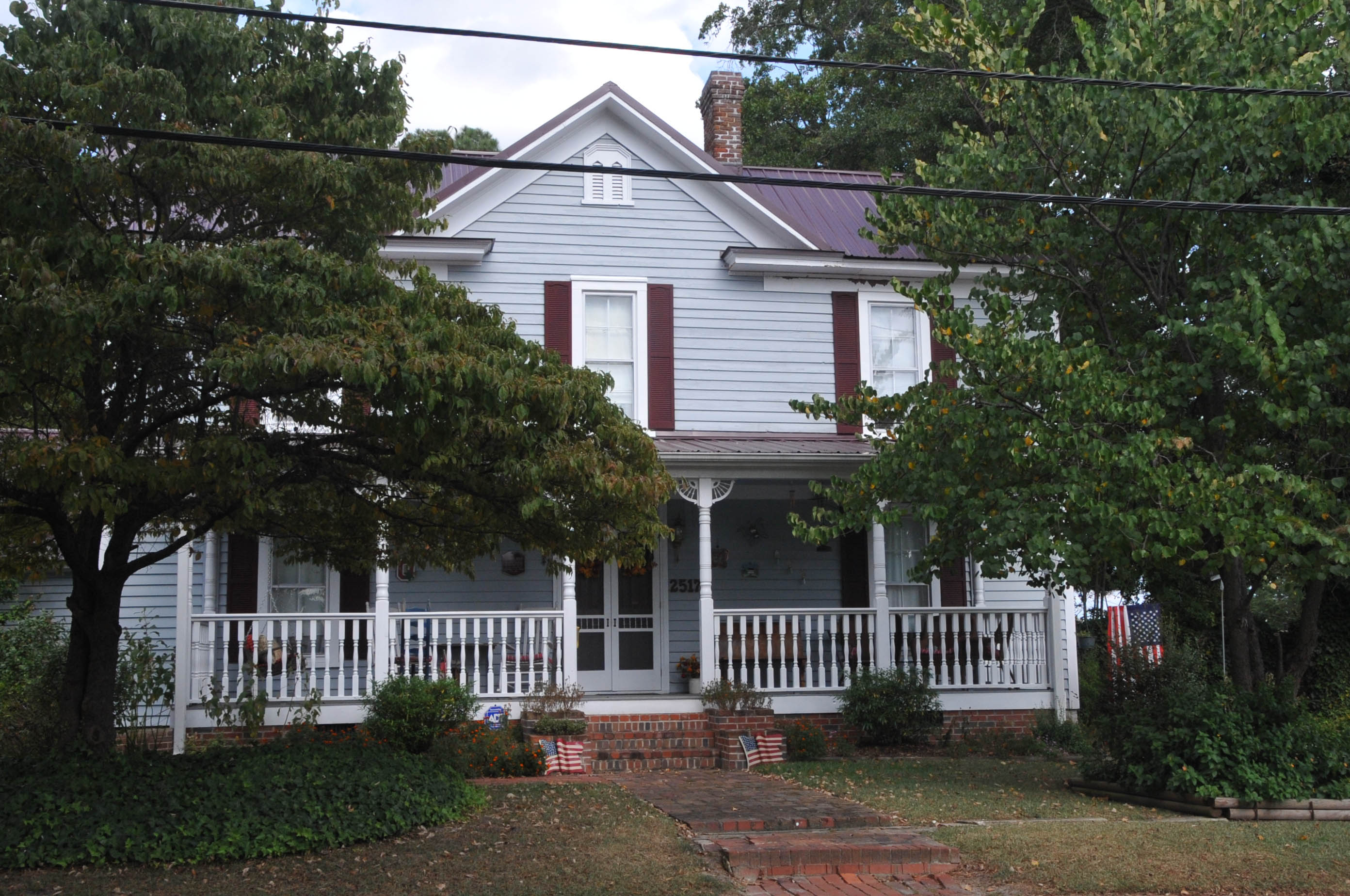
- Barnes House, Lee Avenue Historic District, March 2007

- Location within North Carolina Location within the United States
- Location: Roughly along Lee Avenue, W. Main St., S. Academy St., and W. Raleigh St., Sanford, North Carolina
- Coordinates: 35°27′19″N 79°09′12″W
- Area: 54 acres (22 ha)
- Built: 1882
- Architect: Cox, Leslie P.; McBryde, et al.
- Architectural style: Bungalow/craftsman, et al.
- MPS: Lee County MPS
- NRHP reference No.: 02000944
- Added to NRHP: September 6, 2002

Lee Avenue Historic District is a national historic district located at Sanford, Lee County, North Carolina. It encompasses 70 contributing buildings in the historic village of Jonesboro, now part of Sanford. The district includes notable examples of Bungalow / American Craftsman style architecture, with buildings largely dated between about 1882 to the 1940s. Notable buildings include the Pierce-Seawell House (c. 1882), Barnes House (c. 1886), Jonesboro Methodist Church Parsonage (c. 1885), Lonnie Thomas House (1941), and Jonesboro Baptist Church (1950).

It was listed on the National Register of Historic Places in 2002.
