= Little Buffalo Creek (Deep River tributary) =

Stream in North Carolina, USA

Little Buffalo Creek Tributary to Deep River
- Location of Little Buffalo Creek mouth Little Buffalo Creek (Deep River tributary) (the United States)

Location
- Country: United States
- State: North Carolina
- County: Lee
- City: Sanford

Physical characteristics
- Source: divide of Gasters Creek
  - location: Sanford, North Carolina
  - coordinates: 35°27′43″N 079°09′12″W
  - elevation: 400 ft (120 m)
- Mouth: Deep River
  - location: about 2 miles east-northeast of Farmville, North Carolina
  - coordinates: 35°34′44″N 079°11′21″W
  - elevation: 198 ft (60 m)
- Length: 9.33 mi (15.02 km)
- Basin size: 8.20 square miles (21.2 km^{2})
- Discharge
  - location: Deep River
  - average: 9.80 cu ft/s (0.278 m^{3}/s) at mouth with Deep River

Basin features
- Progression: Deep River → Cape Fear River → Atlantic Ocean
- River system: Deep River
- Tributaries
  - left: unnamed tributaries
  - right: unnamed tributaries
- Waterbodies: unnamed reservoir
- Bridges: US 421, E Rose Street, S 3rd Street, Hickory Avenue, Maple Avenue, McIver Street, Charlotte Avenue, E Chisholm Street, E Weatherspoon Street, NC 87, Amos Bridges Road, US 1, Oak Park Road, Deep River Road

Little Buffalo Creek is a 9.33 mi (15.02 km) long 2nd order tributary to the Deep River in Lee County, North Carolina.

== Course ==
Little Buffalo Creek rises in Sanford, North Carolina and then flows north to the Deep River about 2 miles east-northeast of Farmville, North Carolina.

== Watershed ==
Little Buffalo Creek drains 8.20 square miles (21.2 km^{2}) of area, receives about 47.6 in/year of precipitation, and has a wetness index of 458.86 and is about 35% forested.
