= Euphronia Presbyterian Church =

Historic district in North Carolina, United States

- U.S. National Register of Historic Places
- U.S. Historic district
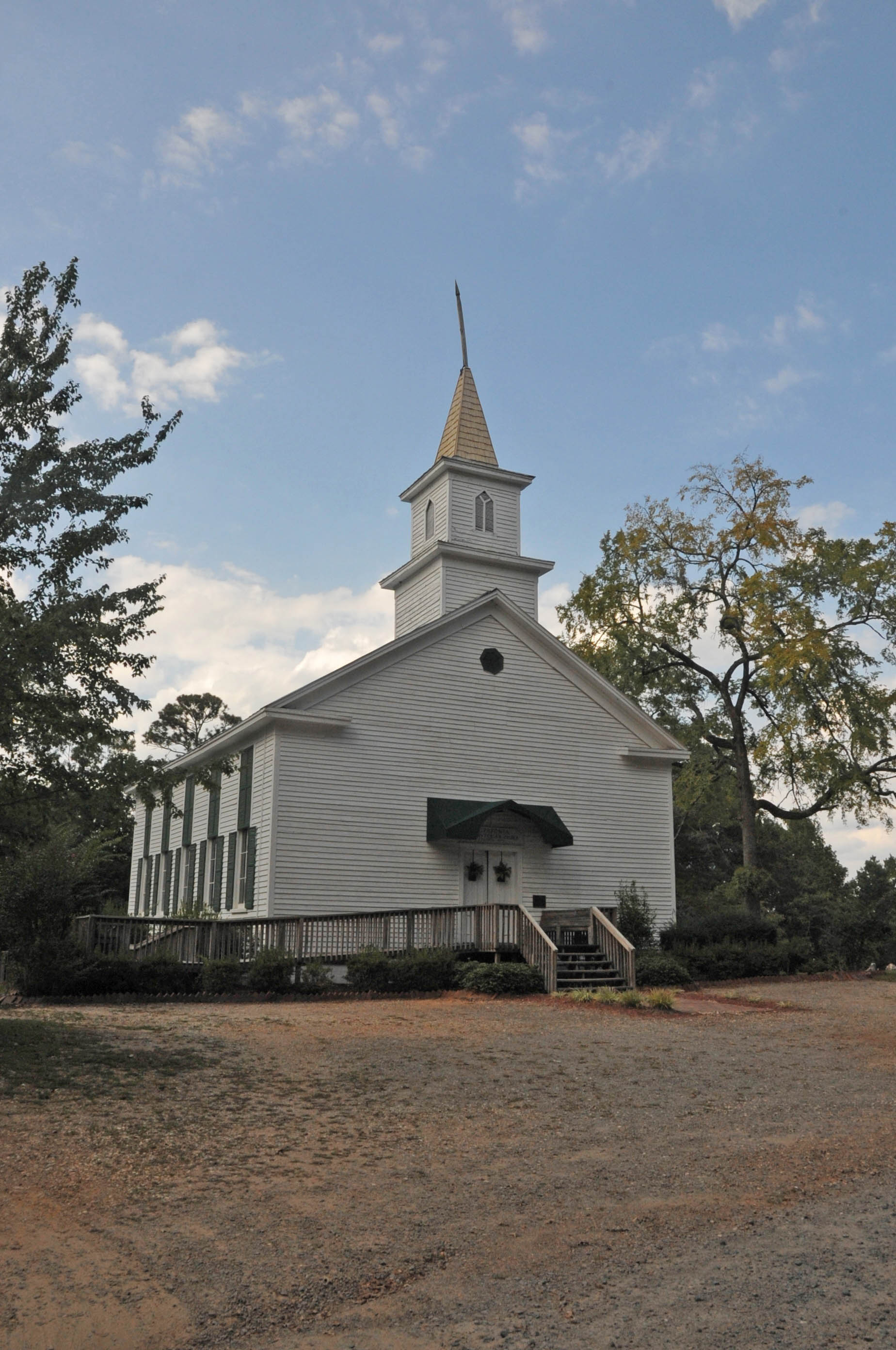
- Euphronia Presbyterian Church, March 2007

- Location within North Carolina Location within the United States
- Location: 3800 Steel Bridge Rd., near Sanford, North Carolina
- Coordinates: 35°28′17″N 79°20′51″W
- Area: 2.4 acres (0.97 ha)
- Built: 1886
- Built by: Campbell, Daniel C.
- MPS: Lee County MPS
- NRHP reference No.: 94000527
- Added to NRHP: May 26, 1994

Euphronia Presbyterian Church is a historic Presbyterian church and national historic district located at 3800 Steel Bridge Road near Sanford, Lee County, North Carolina. It was built in 1886, and is a two-story frame building with weatherboard siding and a gable-fronted nave form. It features a two-tier belfry rising from the roof ridge. Also on the property is a contributing church cemetery.

It was listed on the National Register of Historic Places in 1994.
