= John D. McIver Farm =

Historic farm in North Carolina, United States

- U.S. National Register of Historic Places
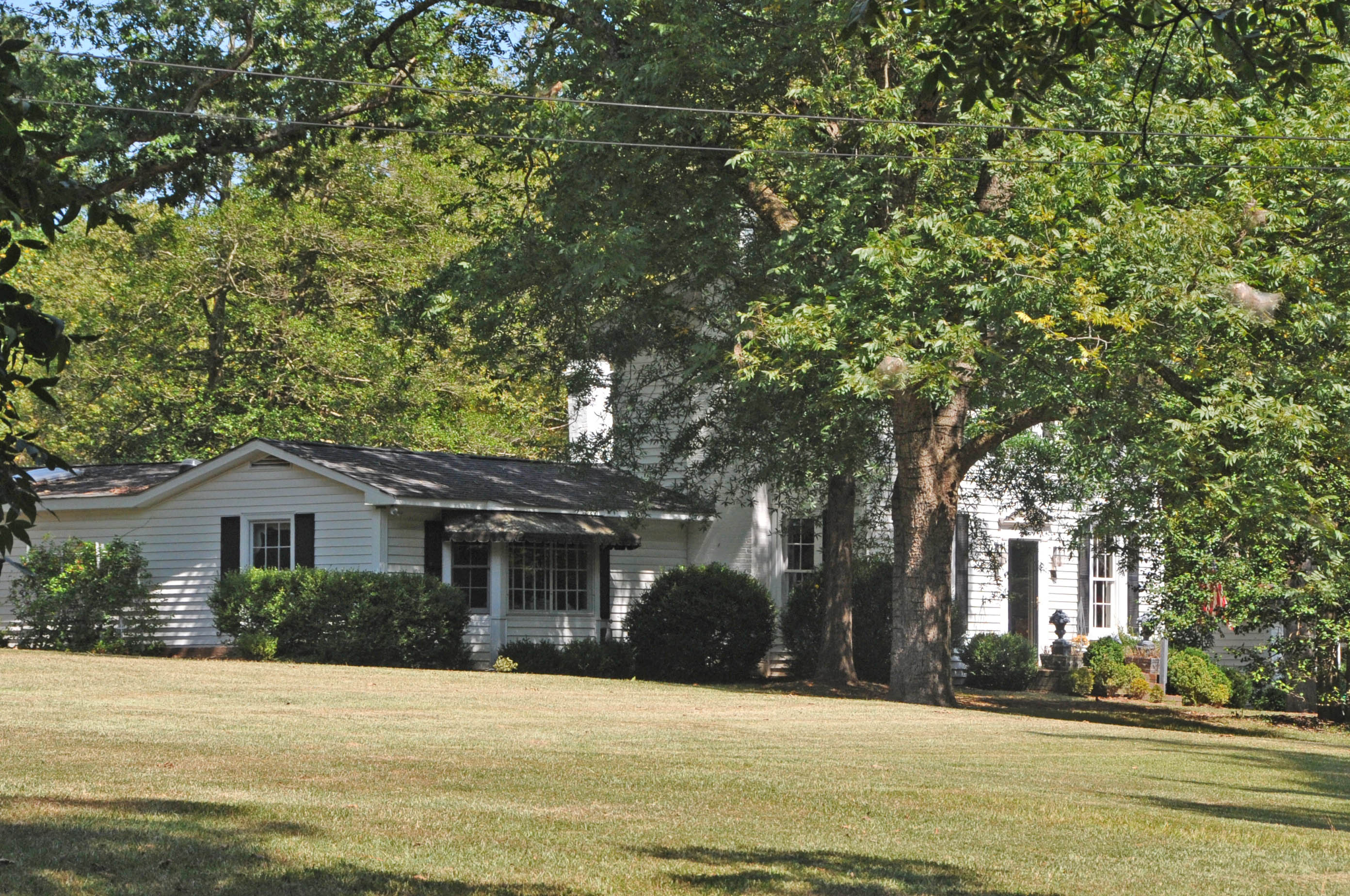
- John D. McIver Farm, March 2007

- Location within North Carolina Location within the United States
- Location: 2007 Windmill Dr., near Sanford, North Carolina
- Coordinates: 35°29′38″N 79°12′30″W
- Area: 6.3 acres (2.5 ha)
- Built: c. 1855
- Architectural style: Greek Revival
- MPS: Lee County MPS
- NRHP reference No.: 93000729
- Added to NRHP: August 18, 1993

John D. McIver Farm is a historic home and farm located near Sanford, Lee County, North Carolina. The farmhouse was built about 1855, and is a two-story, weatherboarded, mortise-and-tenon frame I-house with Greek Revival style design elements. It sits on a brick and brownstone foundation, has exterior gable-end brick chimneys, an integral one-story-ell, and later additions. Also on the property are the contributing meat house (c. 1855), well no. 1 (c. 1855), wooden gate posts and fence (mid-19th century), and corn crib (mid-19th century).

It was listed on the National Register of Historic Places in 1993.
