= Downtown Sanford Historic District =

Historic district in North Carolina, United States

- U.S. National Register of Historic Places
- U.S. Historic district
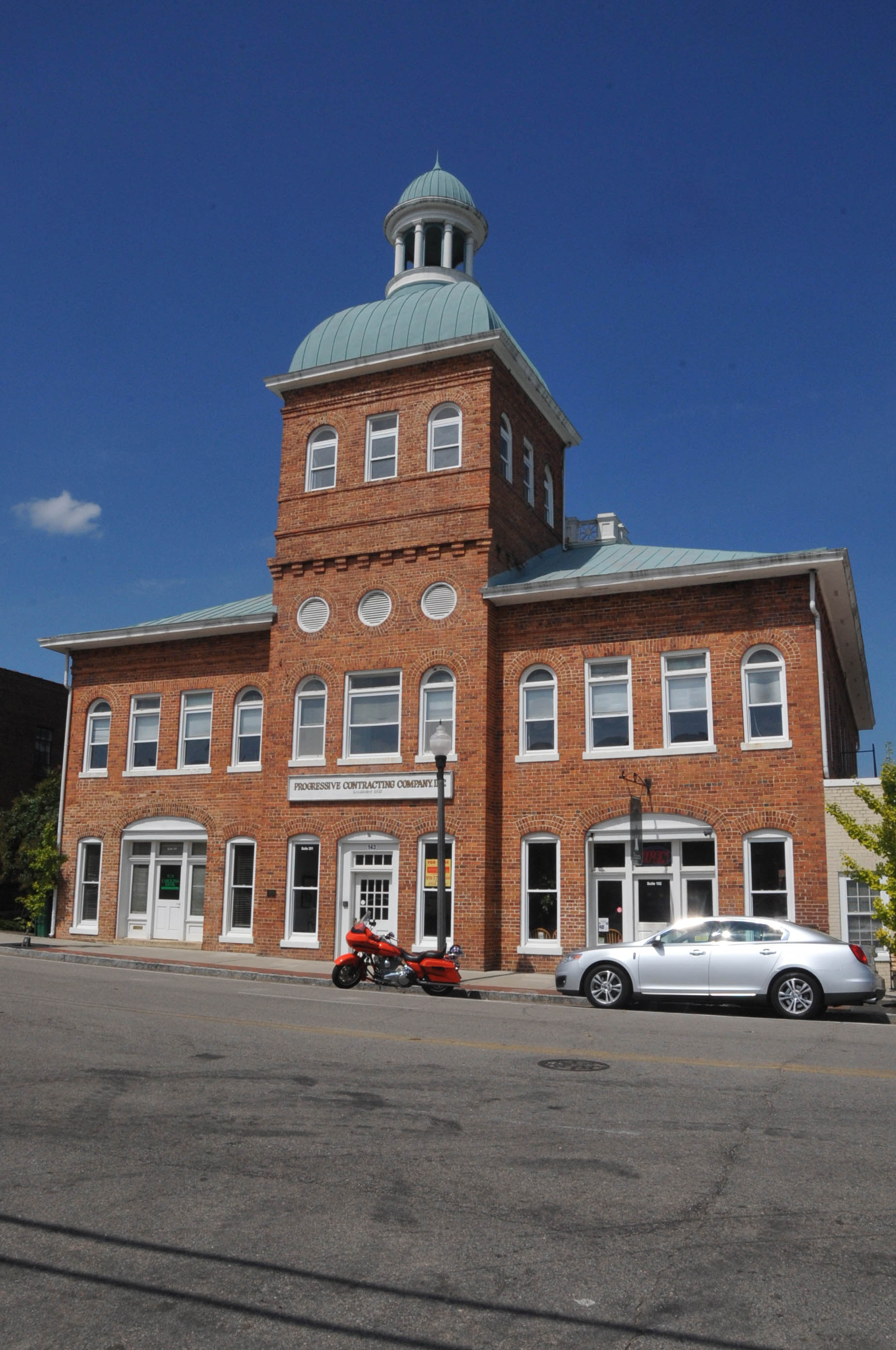
- City Hall, Downtown Sanford Historic District, March 2007

- Location within North Carolina Location within the United States
- Location: Roughly bounded by Gordon St., Horner Blvd., Cole and Chatham Sts., Sanford, North Carolina
- Coordinates: 35°28′49″N 79°10′42″W
- Area: 38 acres (15 ha)
- Built: 1872
- Architectural style: Colonial Revival, Tudor Revival, Art Deco
- NRHP reference No.: 85002561 (original); 100006819 (increase)

Significant dates
- Added to NRHP: September 28, 1985
- Boundary increase: August 16, 2021

Downtown Sanford Historic District is a national historic district located at Sanford, Lee County, North Carolina. It encompasses 53 contributing buildings in the central business district of Sanford. The district includes notable examples of Colonial Revival, Tudor Revival and Art Deco style architecture, with buildings largely dated between about 1895 to 1930. Located in the district are the separately listed Railroad House and Temple Theatre. Other notable buildings include the Sanford Buggy Company (c. 1908), McCracken Building (c. 1910), Passenger Depot (c. 1900), City Hall (c. 1909), Coca-Cola Bottling Company (c. 1908), Masonic Lodge (c. 1924), Makepeace Building (1924), Wilrick Hotel (1925), Bowers Building (c. 1925), Cole Pontiac Building (c. 1925), Hubbards Shoe Store (1926), Carolina Hotel (1930), and former U. S. Post Office (c. 1935).

It was listed on the National Register of Historic Places in 1985, with a boundary change in 2021.
