= Temple Theatre (Sanford, North Carolina) =

Historic building in North Carolina, US

- U.S. National Register of Historic Places
- U.S. Historic district – Contributing property
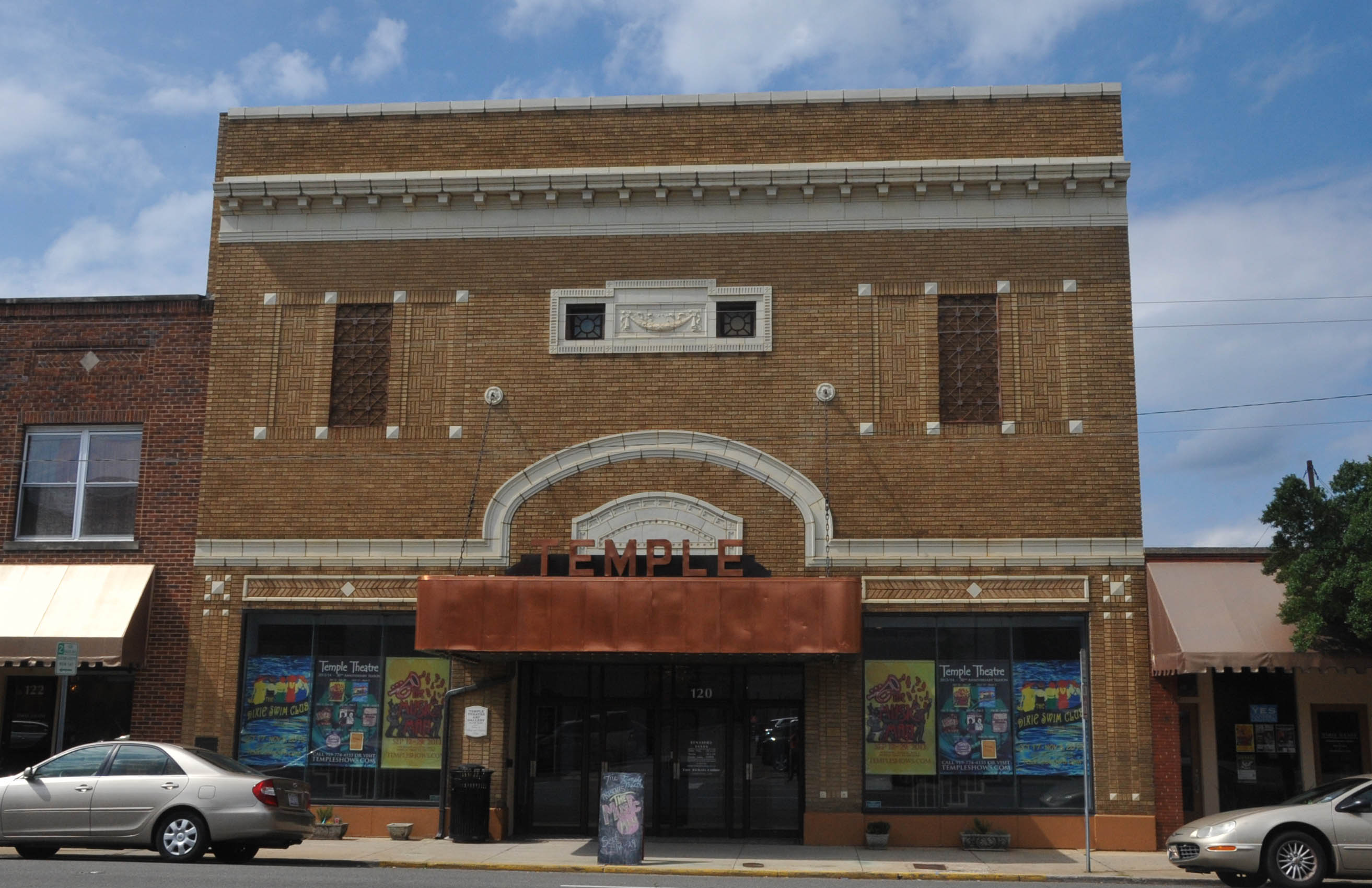
- Temple Theatre, March 2007

- Location within North Carolina Location within the United States
- Location: 120 Carthage St., Sanford, North Carolina
- Coordinates: 35°28′52″N 79°10′44″W
- Area: 0.1 acres (0.040 ha)
- Built: 1925
- Built by: Joe W. Stout Co.
- Architect: Flanagan, Eric G.
- Architectural style: Colonial Revival, Modern Movement
- NRHP reference No.: 83001895
- Added to NRHP: September 8, 1983

The Temple Theatre is an historic performance center in Sanford, Lee County, North Carolina. The Temple Theatre was built in 1925 by Robert Ingram, Sr. (owner of the Sanford Coca-Cola Bottling Company), at a time when Sanford had a population of only 3,500. The name "Temple" comes from being located next door to what was once Sanford's Masonic Lodge. The following quote ran in a 1925 issue of the Sanford Express, "In erecting this modern theater, he has spared no expense to make it an up-to-date playhouse." The two-story, brick building is 50 feet wide and 92 feet deep and is decorated with cut stone details in a blend of Colonial Revival and Art Deco styles.

== History ==
For several decades, the Temple served as Lee County, North Carolina's principal seat of entertainment. Located half a block from the railroad station, the Temple was a frequent locale for the shows and stars of Vaudeville. Years later, the Temple became a touring house for the road shows of the 1930s (including burlesque), and then a movie theater. During the 1960s, the Sanford Little Theatre and the Footlight Players used the Temple for their community productions. In 1965, the Temple Theatre closed.

The rebirth of the Temple Theatre began in 1981 when Mr. Robert Ingram, Jr., the son of the theatre's original owner, donated the building to the citizens of Lee County. Through the efforts of Sam Bass, the building was listed on the National Register of Historic Places in 1983 and received a large challenge grant from the North Carolina Legislature. It is located in the Downtown Sanford Historic District. Lee County citizens and businesses matched the grant, along with a significant grant from the Z. Smith Reynolds Foundation. The building was gutted and the vandalized shell of Temple Theatre was refurbished with the comfort of both the patron and performer in mind. In 1984, Temple reopened as a community theater. The first show at the newly renovated Temple was Chicago. Ticket prices for an individual show were $3 and $4. A season ticket of four shows was $12. All shows were produced by the Footlight Players, and The Temple paid the bills and sold the tickets.

In 1986, the first "Temple Theatre Day" was instituted and was held around April 1. It was a community and patron focused fundraiser. Patterned after The United Way's fund-raising organization, the first one was chaired by local businessman Lamar Beach. Funds raised by this scheme were designated for the theatre's staff salaries, insurance and utilities throughout the year. It continued to be an annual event although the date was later changed to accommodate the theatre's fiscal year change to July 1 to be in line with the State's Art Council grant cycle.

In the summer of 1987, the Temple embarked on its first professional theatre venture, producing three shows in the summer of 1987 using casts and crews that were all paid. There were no union contracts at that time.

In the summer of 1989, another professional show was produced using contracts with Actors' Equity. In the spring of 1990, the Temple Board of Directors voted to accept a budget that included salaries for actors during the regular season. This was essentially the end of 'community' theatre at the Temple, and while various shows continued to use unpaid, local, actors and tech crew, many in those positions were paid union wages. er retired in 1996, and the box office was filled with various part-time help.

In the fall of 1995, the Temple sponsored a community theatre named "The Community Playhouse". They produced one show a year each September from 1995 – 1998.

The roof on the theatre was completely replaced in the summer of 1998. In the spring of 1996, the balcony was reconfigured, removing two rows of seats and converting the tech office into a reception room. The capacity of the theatre was reduced, and with the addition of computerized box office ticketing, the theatre seating could be adjusted to allow only 299 seats to be sold, fulfilling an agreement with Actors' Equity for a special contract.

The sound equipment was moved to the balcony in the rear. It was later found to be unsatisfactory, so a special booth was built out over the audience from the balcony.

In the fall of 1997, a temporary light truss was added to the down stage for the show 'The Invisible Man'. It was still there in the fall of 2001.

For the marquee sign, the copper letters 'TEMPLE', were constructed by the metal workers at King Roofing in Sanford in 2000. They used an old sign that had been made of galvanized steel.

The lobby's richly painted walls and wooden trim flank the original multi-colored floor of hexagonal tiles. Above hangs a crystal chandelier accented in gold, while twin staircases sweep up on either side of the lobby leading to the balcony where the restored tin ceiling can be best appreciated. Backstage, the actors enjoy comfortable dressing rooms, a kitchen, and a lounge area – an improvement, considering the original structure had one bathroom for the performers and it was located in the basement. There is a full counterweight fly system backstage, an advanced communication network, and a computer-controlled lighting (last updated in 2010) and sound system (lasted updated in 2014), making the theatre practical and workable. Originally, the Temple seated 500. During the 1980's renovation process, seating was reduced to 334. The Temple also has an orchestra pit, which is utilized by musicians, but can be covered to create a larger stage. Because it was designed for vaudeville, the acoustics are superb – highlighted by an ornate, painted tin ceiling, and audience members have a good view of the stage from every seat. In the spring of 2012, the Temple unveiled a new concession and restroom area. In the fall of 2023, they completed a new VIP area to the left of the main concessions area.

The Temple is a cultural center and the top year-round attraction in Lee County. The North Carolina Shakespeare Festival, the Red Clay Ramblers, The Kingston Trio, the Glenn Miller Band, Count Basie, Mark Wills, The Embers, and Nantucket (band) are among the artists who have performed at the Temple Theatre.

== Productions ==
The Temple Theatre Company produces six main stage shows per season ranging from musicals to dramas, with each show running for three weeks. All the actors are paid professionals brought in from across the country. The Temple Theatre is also a Comedy Zone venue and has hosted a number of high-profile stand-up comics in recent years, including Jimmie Walker, Carlos Mencia, Jon Reep, James Gregory (comedian), and Pauly Shore. Special events at the Temple range from pop concerts to dance recitals.

The Temple attracts patrons from the Research Triangle, the Piedmont Triad, and the Sandhills areas on a regular basis. Around 40,000 people visit the Temple each year. All funds raised during the annual fund drive go to the maintenance and operation of the facility (utilities, insurance, equipment, security, etc.). Production expenses come from ticket sales, sponsorships, grants, and advertising. The Temple Theatre is a non-profit organization.

Along with the six main stage shows, Temple produces six student conservatories. During the summer, Temple offers one musical conservatory for ages 8 to 18, a straight play conservatory for ages 8 to 18. Their intensive musical for ages 13 to 18, and their Shakespeare intensive for ages 13 to 18. In the fall, the conservatory is a straight play, and in the spring a conservatory that is a musical, both are for ages 8 to 18.

== Education ==
Temple has many education opportunities for young performers. During the school year, they have many different classes, such as dance (tap and jazz), acting, auditioning and voice. Taking these classes help the young performers be ready to perform on full-scale productions and also have more of a chance to join the Temple Teen Ensemble.

For younger children, Temple also offers a theater opportunity called rising stars. The age range is 4 to 7, and these children work four weeks to put on a show.

For teenagers, Temple has a performance ensemble called the Temple Teen Ensemble. The Temple Teen ensemble consists of almost 20 of the best young performers Temple has to offer, ranging in age from 13 to 18. Temple Teens go around the Sanford area to perform songs for whatever holiday it is. They have several sets ranging from Halloween to Christmas to love songs. The main purpose is to promote the main stage productions. When not performing seasonal songs, they perform one song from all of the main stage musicals to draw interest towards the shows on the mainstage.
