= Rosemount–McIver Park Historic District =

Historic district in North Carolina, United States

- U.S. National Register of Historic Places
- U.S. Historic district
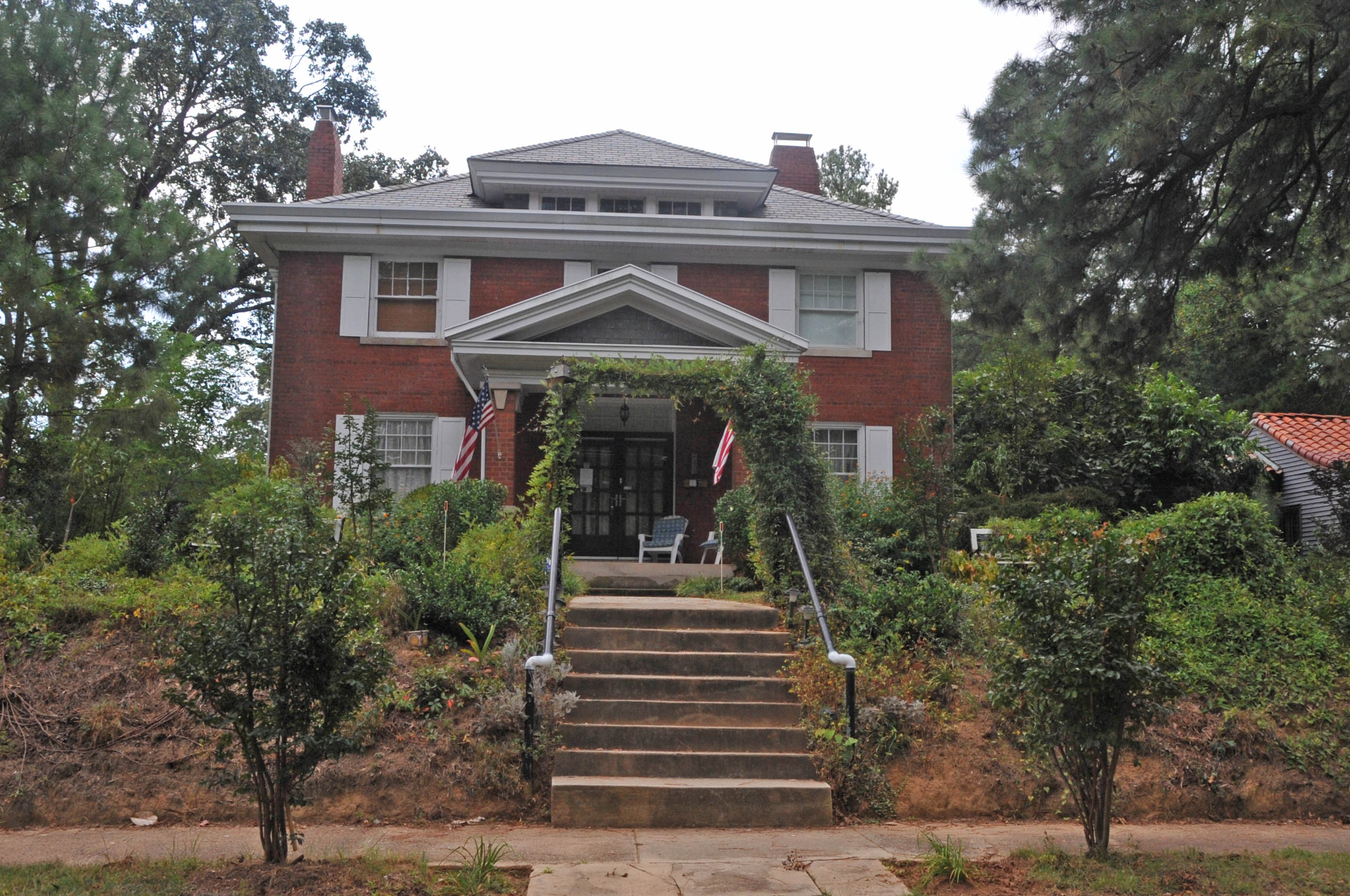
- Frederick P. Strong House (1917), Rosemount–McIver Park Historic District, March 2007

- Location within North Carolina Location within the United States
- Location: Roughly bounded by N. Horner Blvd., N. Vance and Carthage Sts., Sanford, North Carolina
- Coordinates: 35°28′50″N 79°11′09″W
- Area: 80 acres (32 ha)
- Built: 1900
- Architect: Multiple
- Architectural style: Queen Anne, Colonial Revival, Tudor Revival
- MPS: Lee County MPS
- NRHP reference No.: 97000255
- Added to NRHP: March 21, 1997

Rosemount–McIver Park Historic District is a national historic district located at Sanford, Lee County, North Carolina. It encompasses 169 contributing buildings, 1 contributing site, and 1 contributing structure in two residential neighborhoods of Sanford. The district includes notable examples of Colonial Revival, Tudor Revival and Queen Anne style architecture, with buildings largely dated between about 1900 to the early 1940s. The houses are characterized as one story, story-and-a-half, or two stories in height, ranging in scale from compact bungalows and cottages to manorial residences.

It was listed on the National Register of Historic Places in 1997.
