= Hawkins Avenue Historic District =

Historic district in North Carolina, United States

- U.S. National Register of Historic Places
- U.S. Historic district
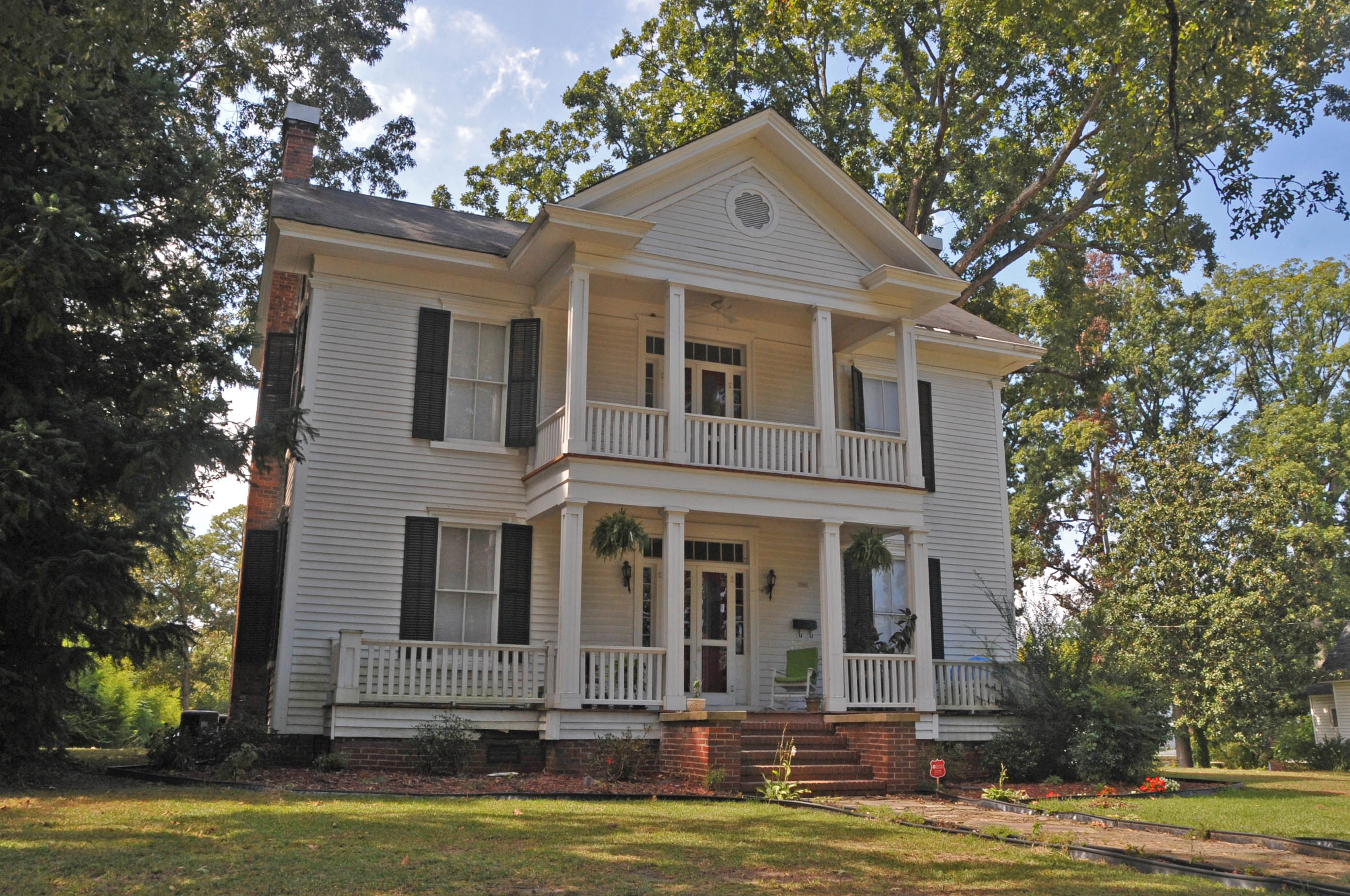
- John McIver House, Hawkins Avenue Historic District, March 2007

- Location within North Carolina Location within the United States
- Location: Roughly bounded by Hill Ave., First St., Charlotte Ave., and Horner Blvd., Sanford, North Carolina
- Coordinates: 35°29′10″N 79°10′50″W
- Area: 84 acres (34 ha)
- Built: 1900
- Architect: Matthews, John; Brown, J.W., et al.
- Architectural style: Queen Anne, Colonial Revival, et al.
- MPS: Lee County MPS
- NRHP reference No.: 00000771
- Added to NRHP: July 5, 2000

Hawkins Avenue Historic District is a national historic district located at Sanford, Lee County, North Carolina. It encompasses 200 contributing buildings and 4 contributing structures in a predominantly residential section of Sanford. The district includes notable examples of Colonial Revival and Queen Anne style architecture, with buildings largely dated between about 1900 to the 1930s. Located in the district is the separately listed Sanford High School, Former. Other notable buildings include the John McIver House (1880s), Duncan E. McIver House (1893), Malcolm D. McNeill House (c. 1903), E.L. Gavin House (1922), First Presbyterian Church of Sanford (1914), First Baptist Church (1925), the former Sanford Cotton Mill complex, and the Liles Bonded Cotton Warehouse (c. 1920).

It was listed on the National Register of Historic Places in 2000.
