= Farish-Lambeth House =

Historic house in North Carolina, United States

- U.S. National Register of Historic Places
- Location within North Carolina Location within the United States
- Location: 6308 Deep River Rd., near Sanford, North Carolina
- Coordinates: 35°36′52″N 79°7′00″W
- Area: 5 acres (2.0 ha)
- Built: 1852
- Architectural style: Greek Revival
- MPS: Lee County MPS
- NRHP reference No.: 02000111
- Added to NRHP: March 1, 2002

Farish-Lambeth House is a historic home located near Sanford, Lee County, North Carolina. It was built in 1852, and is a two-story, four-bay, Greek Revival style frame dwelling. It is sheathed in weatherboard, sits on a brick foundation, has exterior gable-end brick chimneys, and a one-story hip-roofed front porch. Also on the property is a contributing chicken house (1930s).

It was listed on the National Register of Historic Places in 2002.
