= Lee County Courthouse (North Carolina) =

Historic courthouse in North Carolina, US

- U.S. National Register of Historic Places
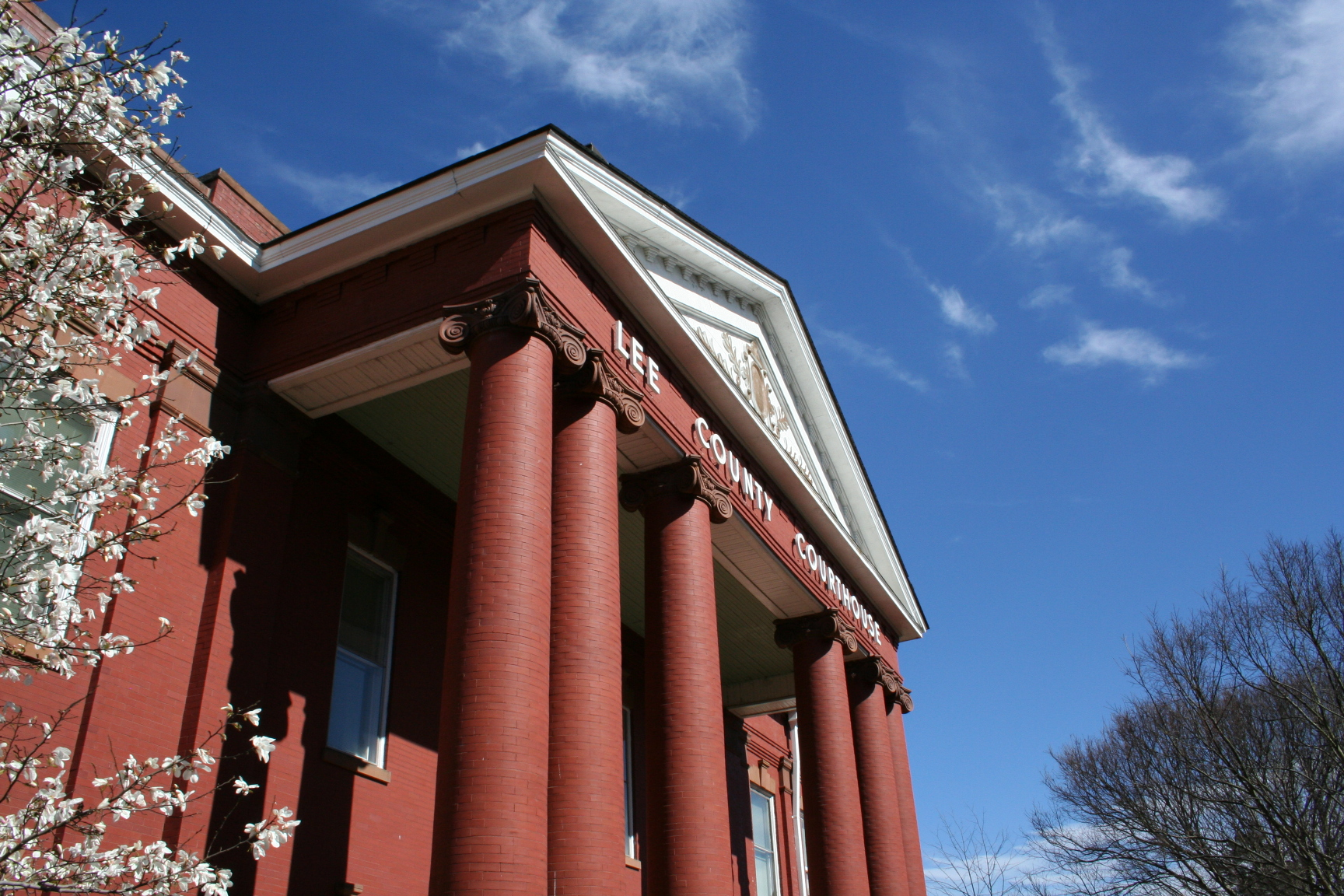
- Lee County Courthouse, March 2007

- Location within North Carolina Location within the United States
- Location: Horner Blvd., between Courtland and McIntosh Sts., Sanford, North Carolina
- Coordinates: 35°28′03.82″N 79°9′48.4″W
- Area: 2 acres (0.81 ha)
- Built: 1908
- Architect: McMillan, Charles
- Architectural style: Classical Revival
- MPS: North Carolina County Courthouses TR
- NRHP reference No.: 79001729
- Added to NRHP: May 10, 1979

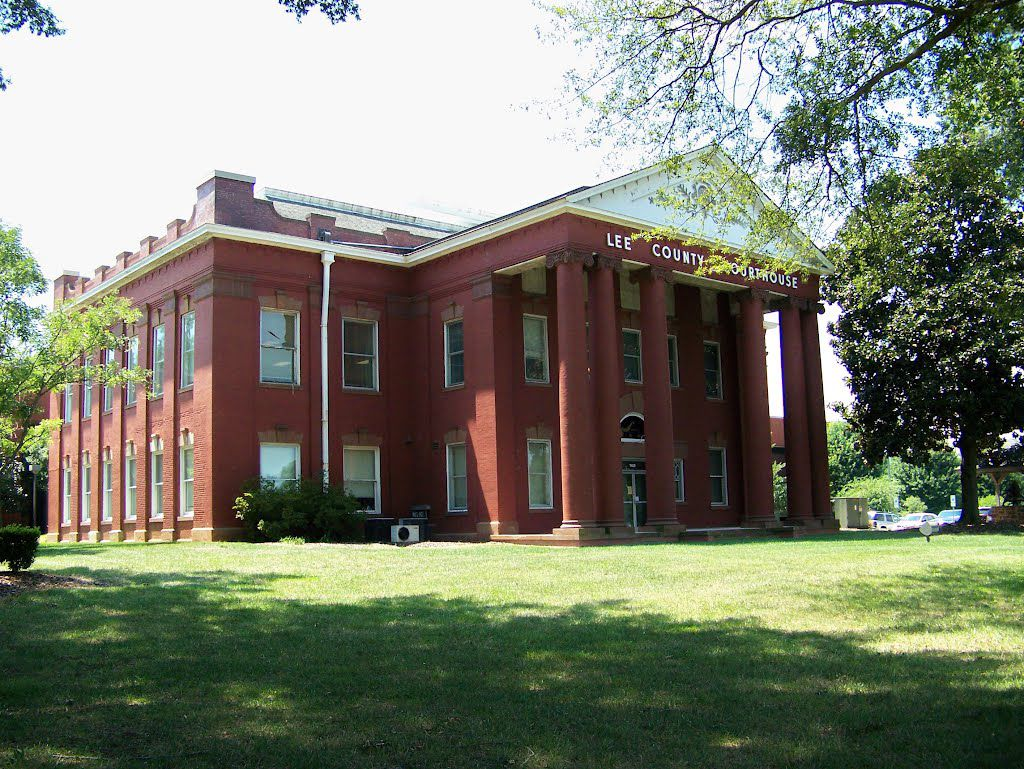
August 2014

Lee County Courthouse is a historic courthouse located at Sanford, Lee County, North Carolina. It was built in 1908, and is a two-story rectangular brick building in the Classical Revival style. The east and west sides features monumental hexastyle porticoes supported by Ionic order brick columns. Atop the hipped roof is a small dome.

It was listed on the National Register of Historic Places in 1979.
