= Railroad House =

United States historic place

- U.S. National Register of Historic Places
- U.S. Historic district – Contributing property
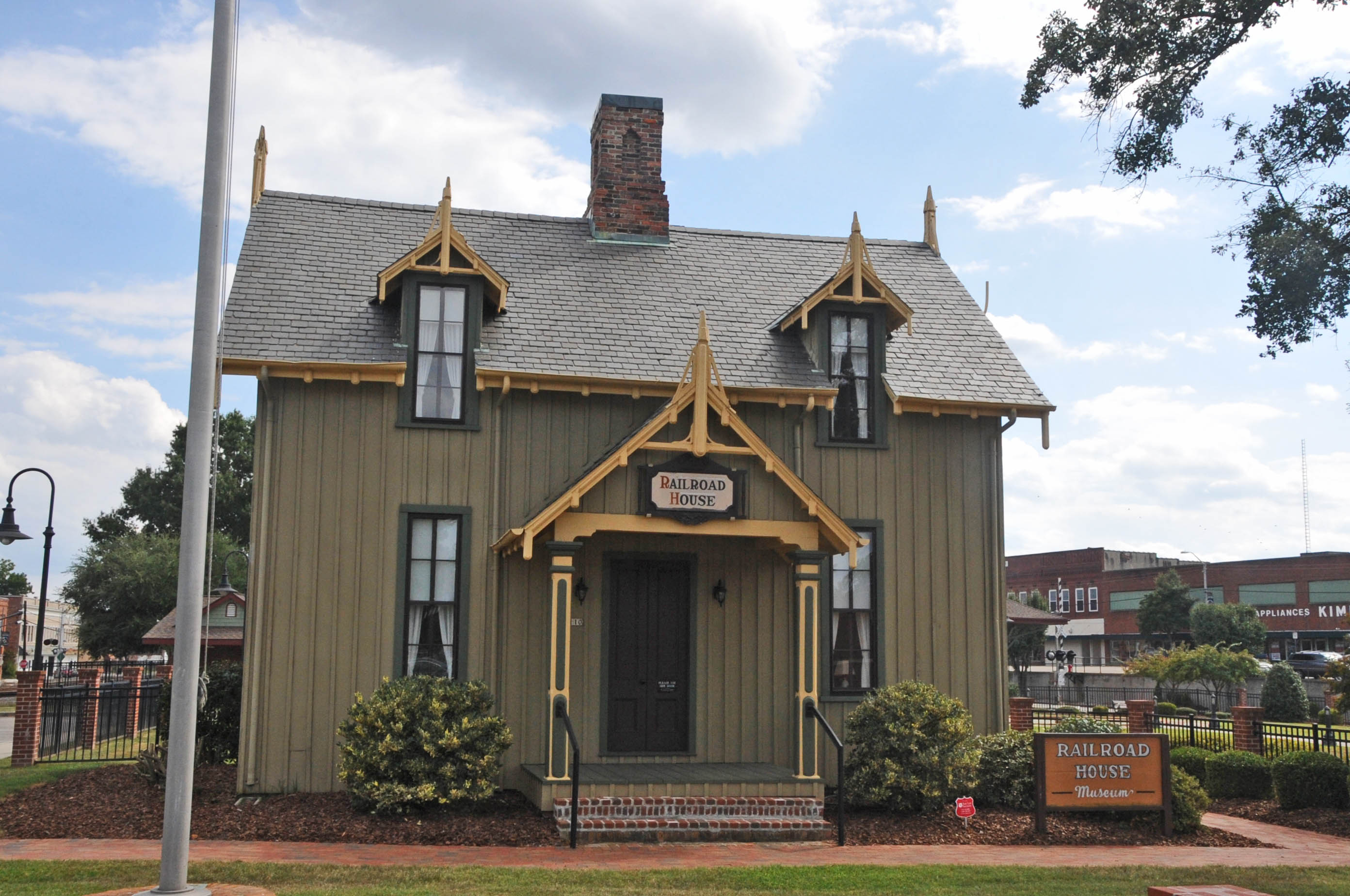
- Railroad House, March 2007

- Location within North Carolina Location within the United States
- Location: Carthage St. at Hawkins Ave., Sanford, North Carolina
- Coordinates: 35°28′50″N 79°10′39″W
- Area: 1.4 acres (0.57 ha)
- Built: 1872
- Architectural style: Gothic
- NRHP reference No.: 73001355
- Added to NRHP: January 29, 1973

Railroad House is a historic home in Sanford, North Carolina. It was built in 1872, and is a 1 1/2-story, three-bay, board-and-batten, Gothic Revival style frame cottage. The gable roof has wide overhanging eaves and "rafter brackets". It has a one-story rear wing, a single central interior chimney in the main block, and an exterior end chimney at the rear of the wing. It was built by the Raleigh and Augusta Air Line Railroad for the depot agent. The house was moved to its present site in October 1962, across the street from its original location. The building is operated by the Railroad House Historical Association as a museum.

It was listed on the National Register of Historic Places in 1973. It is located in the Downtown Sanford Historic District.

== See also ==
- Downtown Sanford Historic District
- National Register of Historic Places
- Raleigh and Augusta Air Line Railroad
