= Sanford, North Carolina =

- City
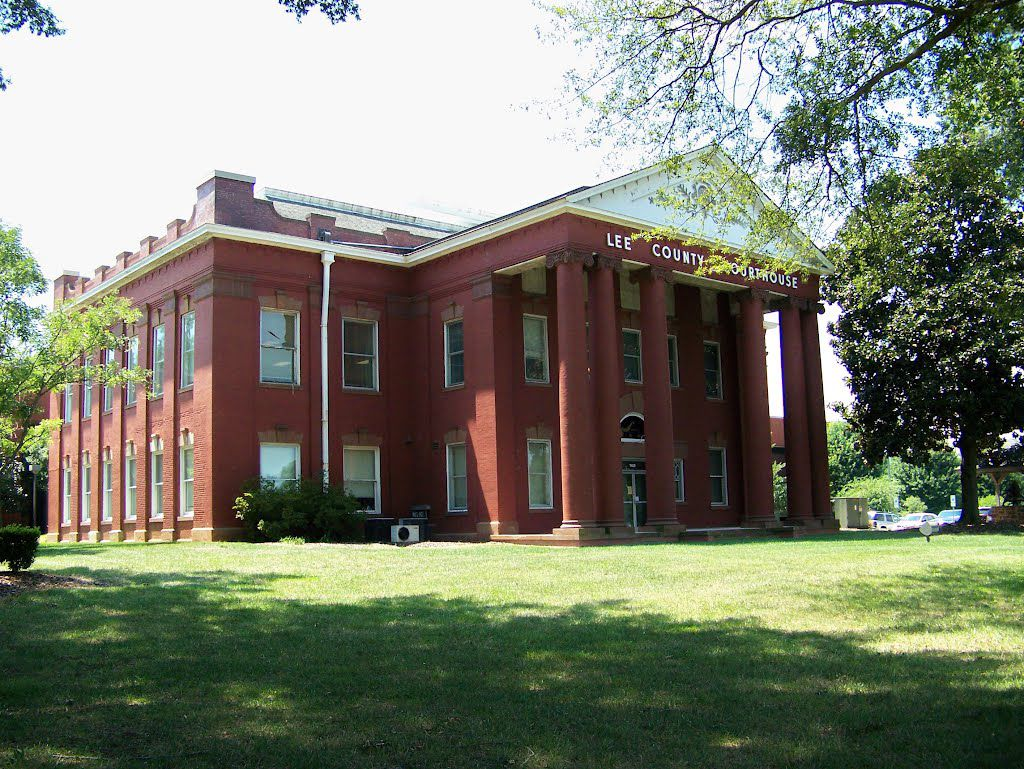
- The Lee County Courthouse in Sanford

- Seal
- Nickname: Well Centered
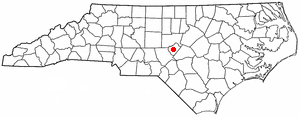
- Location of Sanford, North Carolina
- Coordinates: 35°29′16″N 79°10′42″W
- Country: United States
- State: North Carolina
- County: Lee

Government
  - Type: Council-Manager
  - Body: Sanford City Council
  - Mayor: Rebecca Wyhof Salmon (D)
  - City manager: Hal Hegwer

Area
  - Total: 29.83 sq mi (77.26 km^{2})
  - Land: 29.57 sq mi (76.59 km^{2})
  - Water: 0.26 sq mi (0.67 km^{2})
- Elevation: 358 ft (109 m)

Population (2020)
  - Total: 30,261
  - Density: 1,023.3/sq mi (395.11/km^{2})
- Time zone: UTC−5 (Eastern (EST))
  - Summer (DST): UTC−4 (EDT)
- ZIP Codes: 27330-27332
- Area code: 919
- FIPS code: 37-59280
- GNIS feature ID: 2405419
- Website: www.sanfordnc.net

Sanford is a city in and the county seat of Lee County, North Carolina, United States. Since its incorporation in 1874, Sanford has been an active railroad and industrial center, known as one of the nation's largest producers of brick and pottery products. Its population was 30,261 at the 2020 census. The geographic center of North Carolina is located northwest of the city, in Chatham County.

== History ==
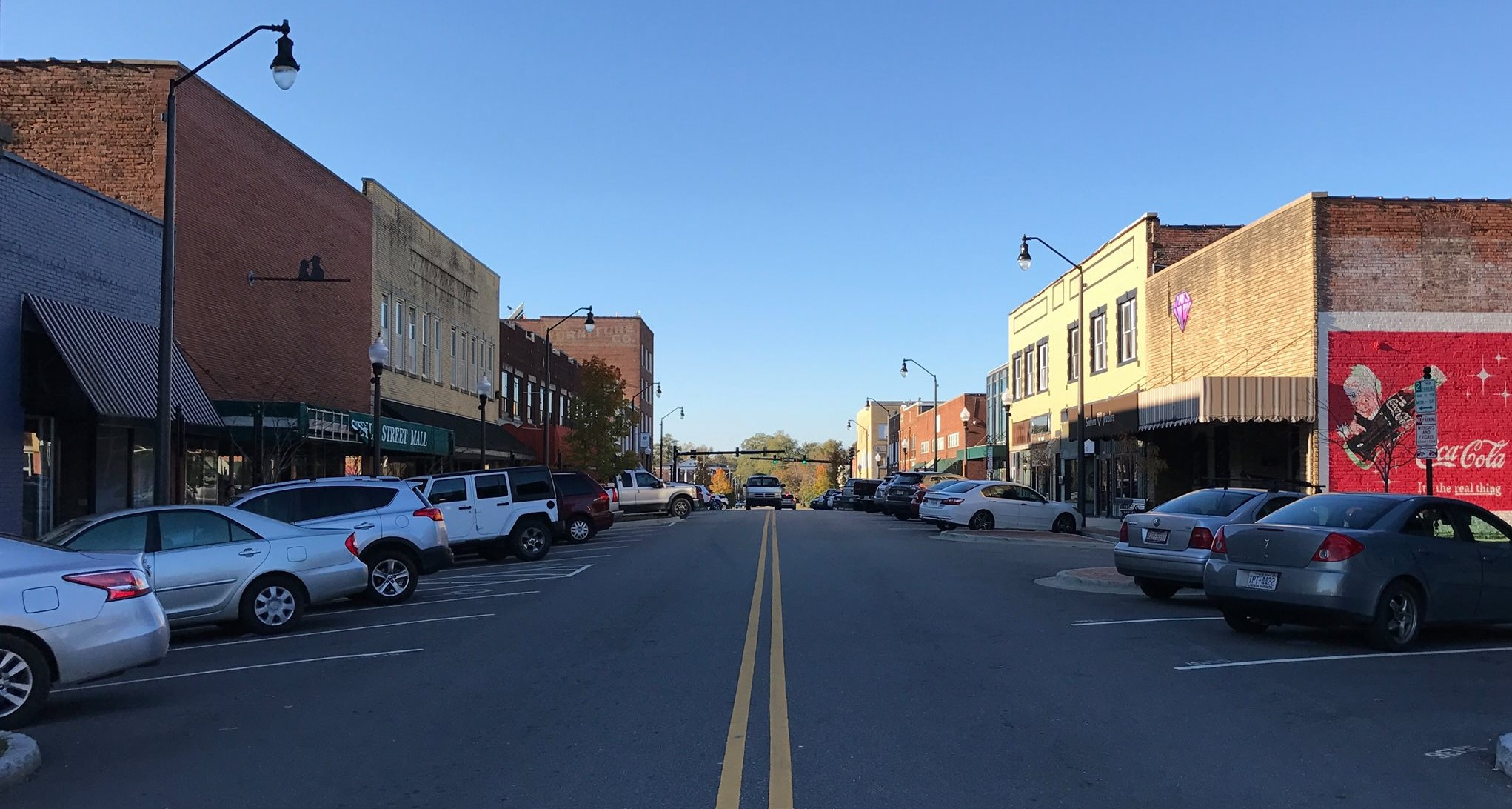
Steele Street in downtown Sanford

Sanford was named for C.O. Sanford, a railroad civil engineer instrumental in the building of the rail lines through the area that formed the foundation of what became the city of Sanford.

Sanford is located in Lee County, North Carolina, which was formed from parts of the surrounding three counties in 1907. On creation of the new county, Sanford and Jonesboro were the major towns in the area. Rather than decide which would be the county seat, the decision was to place the county's new courthouse directly between the two towns. For decades, Lee County was the only county in the United States to have a courthouse with an RFD address. In 1947, Sanford had grown to such an extent that it eventually merged with Jonesboro. The town of Jonesboro became Jonesboro Heights, and the name of Sanford was kept for the town.

The general Sanford area played key roles in the Revolutionary and Civil Wars, specifically regarding sites like the House in the Horseshoe and Endor Iron Furnace. Over the following decades, the Sanford area became an important source of coal, brownstone, and brick. In particular, brownstone and subsequent brick production made Sanford a key provider of these building materials for areas throughout the United States.

For seven seasons, 1941–42 and 1946–50, Sanford fielded a professional minor league baseball team. In 1941–42, the Sanford Spinners played in the Class D level Bi-State League. After the war, a new Spinners team was a member of the Class D level Tobacco State League from 1946 to 1950. Home games were played at Temple Park. Led by manager Zeb Harrington, the Spinners won the regular-season pennant three times.

On April 16, 2011, a large tornado ripped through Sanford, demolishing a Lowe's hardware store and a warehouse and destroying multiple mobile homes and buildings before moving into Wake County.

On October 21, 2014, Sanford established a formal sister-city relationship with Yixing, China. On October 5, 2019, Sanford established a formal sister-city relationship with Atizapan de Zaragoza, Mexico.

The Buffalo Presbyterian Church and Cemeteries, Downtown Sanford Historic District, East Sanford Historic District, Euphronia Presbyterian Church, Farish-Lambeth House, Hawkins Avenue Historic District, Lee Avenue Historic District, Lee County Courthouse, Lee County Training School, John D. McIver Farm, Railroad House, Rosemount-McIver Park Historic District, Sanford High School, Former, Seaboard Milling Company, and Temple Theatre are listed on the National Register of Historic Places.

== Geography ==
Sanford is 42 miles (68 km) southwest of Raleigh, the state capital, 57 miles (92 km) southeast of Greensboro, and 36 miles (58 km) northwest of Fayetteville.

According to the United States Census Bureau, the city has a total area of 29.3 square miles (75.9 km^{2}), of which 29.1 square miles (75.3 km^{2}) are land and 0.3 sq mi (0.7 km^{2}), or 0.88%, is covered by water. Little Buffalo Creek, a tributary of the Deep River, flows northward through the center of the city. Big Buffalo Creek flows through the west side of the city, and the entire city is part of the Cape Fear River watershed. Lick Creek and its tributaries drain the east side of the city.

== Demographics ==
Historical population
Census	Pop.	Note	%±
1880	236		—
1890	367		55.5%
1900	1,044		184.5%
1910	2,282		118.6%
1920	2,977		30.5%
1930	4,253		42.9%
1940	4,960		16.6%
1950	10,013		101.9%
1960	12,253		22.4%
1970	11,716		−4.4%
1980	14,773		26.1%
1990	14,475		−2.0%
2000	23,220		60.4%
2010	28,094		21.0%
2020	30,261		7.7%
U.S. Decennial Census

=== 2020 census ===
As of the 2020 census, Sanford had a population of 30,261. The median age was 35.2 years; 25.7% of residents were under 18 and 14.1% were 65 or older. For every 100 females, there were 93.6 males, and for every 100 females 18 and over, there were 89.8 males 18 and over.

About 98.3% of residents lived in urban areas, while 1.7% lived in rural areas.

Of the 11,447 households in Sanford, including 6,723 families, 36.1% had children under 18 living in them, 40.7% were married-couple households, 18.5% were households with a male householder and no spouse or partner present, and 34.1% were households with a female householder and no spouse or partner present. About 29.2% of all households were made up of individuals, and 11.3% had someone living alone who was 65 or older.

The city had 12,428 housing units, of which 7.9% were vacant. The homeowner vacancy rate was 2.3% and the rental vacancy rate was 7.1%.

Racial composition as of the 2020 census
Race	Number	Percentage
White	14,308	47.3%
Black or African American	7,265	24.0%
American Indian and Alaska Native	263	0.9%
Asian	461	1.5%
Native Hawaiian and other Pacific Islander	32	0.1%
Some other race	4,969	16.4%
Two or more races	2,963	9.8%
Hispanic or Latino (of any race)	8,548	28.2%

=== 2009 ===
The median income in the city for a household was $34,804 and for a family was $39,447. Males had a median income of $30,527 versus $23,393 for females. The per capita income for the city was $17,038. About 14.8% of families and 17.1% of the population were below the poverty line, including 21.4% of those under 18 and 13.0% of those 65 or over.

== Economy ==
Sanford is geologically located above the meeting of white beach sand and Piedmont clay, enabling the city to be a producer of clay bricks. In 1959, Sanford produced 10% of the bricks in the United States and was named "Brick Capital of the USA". Brick production continues by manufacturers such as General Shale and Lee Brick and Tile.

Sanford produces textiles, and a Wyeth vaccine facility became the area's largest employer in 2006.

== Arts and culture ==
=== Museums ===
- Railroad House Museum

=== Performing arts ===
- Temple Theatre

== Government ==
Sanford operates under a council-manager government. The city council consists of the mayor and seven council members. Five of the council seats are ward (district) representatives, and two seats are citywide representatives elected at-large. Terms last four years and are staggered, with elections every two years.

== Education ==
The Lee County campus of Central Carolina Community College (CCCC) is located in Sanford. CCCC awards degrees, diplomas, and certifications in a variety of programs.

The Lee County Schools public school system contains three high schools, three middle schools, seven traditional elementary schools, one year-round elementary school, and one alternative school.

- The three high schools are Lee County High School, Lee Early College on CCCC's campus, and Southern Lee High School. The latter two opened during the 2005–2006 school year.
- The three middle schools are West Lee Middle School, East Lee Middle School, and SanLee Middle School, which opened in the 2008–2009 school year.
- The alternative school, Bragg Street Academy, serves students in grades 6 through 12.
- The seven traditional elementary schools are B.T. Bullock Elementary, Broadway Elementary, Deep River Elementary, Greenwood Elementary, J. Glenn Edwards Elementary, J.R. Ingram Jr, and W.B. Wicker. Elementary. The year-round elementary school, Tramway Elementary, operates on a lottery.

The three public charter schoolsare MINA Charter, serving students in kindergarten through 5th grade, and Ascend Leadership Academy and Central Carolina Academy, serving students in 6th through 12th grades.

Two private Christian schools serve preschool through 12th grade students: Grace Christian and Lee Christian.

== Parks and recreation ==
- San-Lee Park is a large park of more than 177 acres. It includes two stocked lakes available for fishing and where boats can be rented, a Nature Center, campgrounds, hiking trails, and a mountain-bike trail of various trail terrains.
- Kiwanis Family Park offers an inclusive playground for all abilities, a half-mile fitness trail, picnic facilities, and a gazebo.
- Kiwanis Children's Park has three pickleball courts, two tennis courts, one youth tennis court, a playground, and shaded picnic tables.
- Lett Family Park: the Gilbert Lett Family Park has two ballfields, and the Lett Center. The Lett Center is rented out for events of up to 65 people.
- OT Sloan Park and Center are near the dog park and at the tennis center, its sheltered picnic area can host up to 60 people. The O.T. Sloan Picnic Area include a playground for all abilities, a pool, youth baseball fields, and a volleyball court.
- Dalrymple Park has tennis courts, baseball fields, fitness trails, and facilities for events that accommodate up to 100 people.
- Tramway Road Park has softball fields and baseball fields, as well as a playground.
- Horton Park has a swimming pool and other outdoor activities, such as running or walking on paved trails. Also, children's playgrounds and sheltered picnic tables are available.

== Media ==
=== Newspapers ===
The city's newspaper of record is The Sanford Herald, which has published continuously since 1930. The newspaper is owned by Paxton Media Group, based in Paducah, Kentucky. The Herald is a five-day-a-week morning newspaper and is a member of the Audit Bureau of Circulations and of the North Carolina Press Association.

The Rant was founded in 2008 by former journalists with experience at several print publications, including The Sanford Herald. Initially a radio show, it became an online news site in 2014. In 2019, it began publishing a monthly print edition.

=== Radio stations ===
- WFJA Classic Hits and Oldies 105.5 FM - classic hits and oldies
- WWGP 1050 AM Today's Best Country – country, "the Swap Shop", and local news
- W204AV 88.7 – Christian
- WDCC 90.5 – variety (owned by CCCC)
- WLHC 103.1 – pop standards
- WDSG 107.9 – beach, oldies, and gospel
- WXKL 1290 – gospel

== Infrastructure ==
=== Transportation ===
==== Air ====
Raleigh Executive Jetport (ICAO: KTTA, FAA LID: TTA), formerly known as Sanford-Lee County Airport, is located 8 miles (13 km) northeast of Sanford via U.S. 1. The airport opened in 2000, replacing the Sanford Lee County Brick Field, and provides both recreational and corporate services.

==== Designated routes and highways ====
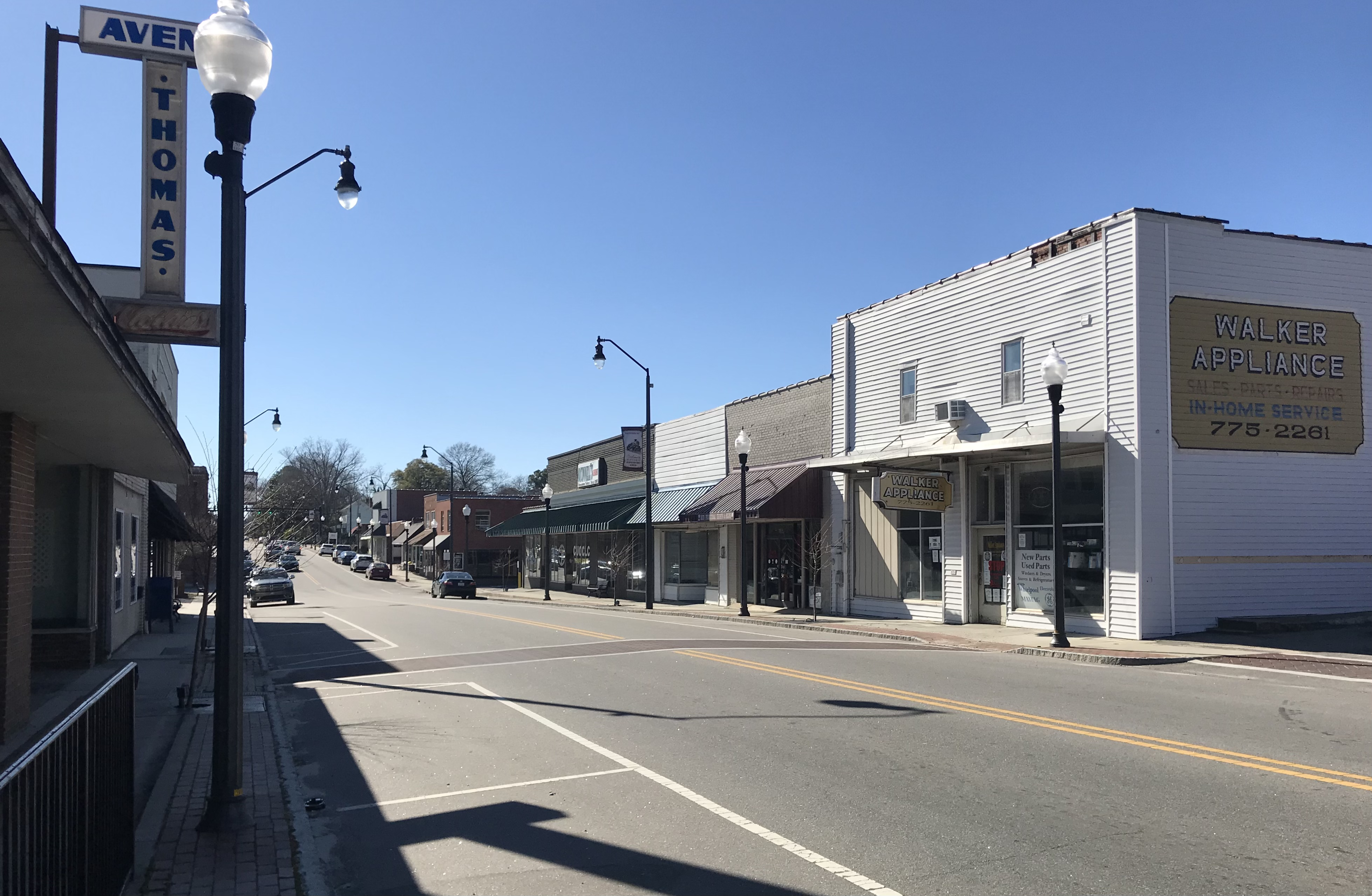
Main Street (N.C. Route 78) passing through Jonesboro Heights

- United States Highways:
  - U.S. 1, known also in parts as Jefferson Davis Hwy and Hawkins Avenue (U.S. Bus 1)
  - U.S. Route 15
  - U.S. Route 421, known as Horner Boulevard
  - U.S. Route 501
- North Carolina Highways:
  - N.C. Route 42
  - N.C. Route 78
  - N.C. Route 87

==== Commercial rail service ====
- CSX Transportation
- Norfolk Southern Railway
- Atlantic and Western Railway short line
- Atlantic and Yadkin Railway

==== Public transit ====
The County of Lee Transit System (COLTS) is a coordinated transit system that provides transportation services in Sanford and Lee County.

==== Bicycle and pedestrian ====
- The Maine-to-Florida U.S. Bicycle Route 1 passes through downtown Sanford and Lee County.
- A half-mile greenway trail is located in the Kiwanis Family Park with additional mileage under development.

== Notable people ==
- Hardy Boyz, WWE wrestlers (older brother Matt was born in a Sanford hospital, and both lived there for a few months)
- Bill Briggs, NFL defensive end
- Britton Buchanan, runner-up on the fourteenth season of The Voice
- Floyd Council, blues musician
- Lita (Amy Dumas), former |WWE Diva, now resides in Atlanta, Georgia
- Bill Harrington, MLB pitcher
- Margaret P. Hoke, first Black librarian
- J. D. McDuffie, NASCAR driver
- Jack Pittman, illustrator and cartoonist
- ACHES (Patrick Price), professional eSports player, best known for playing Call of Duty
- Robert T. Reives II, member of the North Carolina House of Representatives
- Herb Thomas, NASCAR driver
- Dennis Wicker, former lieutenant governor, partner at Nelson Mullins Law Firm

== Sister cities ==
Sanford has two sister cities, as designated by Sister Cities International:

- Yixing, Jiangsu, China
- Atizapán de Zaragoza, State of México, Mexico
