= Central Carolina Community College =

Public community college in North Carolina, U.S.

Central Carolina Community College (CCCC) is a public community college with campuses in Chatham, Harnett and Lee counties. Established in 1961, CCCC is part of the North Carolina Community College System and offers a diverse range of academic and career and technical programs to meet the educational needs of its communities.

== History ==
Founded in 1961, Central Carolina Community College began as a regional educational institution aimed at providing accessible higher education and vocational training. Over the years, the college has expanded its offerings and facilities to better serve its students and the surrounding communities.

== Academics ==
CCCC offers a comprehensive array of programs designed to cater to various academic and career interests. The college has seven Career Communities: Applied Technologies, Arts, Business Technologies, Health Sciences, Professional Services, Public Safety, and STEM (Science, Technology, Engineering & Math).

Some of the college’s most visible programs include Biotechnology, Building Construction Technology, Dental, Laser & Photonics Technology, Nursing, Sustainable Agriculture, Veterinary Medical Technology, and many others.

Associate Degrees: Associate in Arts, Associate in Science, and Associate in Applied Science degrees are available, with many students transferring to four-year institutions after completing their studies.

Diplomas and Certificates: The college provides one-year or shorter vocational and academic programs leading to diplomas or certificates.

Adult Education: Non-curriculum credit courses are offered in Adult Basic Education and other areas, including technical, vocational, academic, and general interest subjects.

The college also partners with local school districts to offer early college programs, allowing students to earn both a high school diploma and an associate degree simultaneously.

== Facilities ==
Central Carolina Community College operates campuses and facilities in Chatham, Harnett and Lee counties in Central North Carolina.

=== Chatham County ===
The Chatham Main Campus is located in Pittsboro, NC – and includes the CCCC Student Farm. Other key locations in Chatham include the Chatham Health Sciences Center north of Pittsboro and the Siler City Center in Siler City.

=== Harnett County ===
The Harnett Main Campus is located in Lillington, NC as is the nearby Harnett Health Sciences Center. The college also maintains facilities at the West Harnett Center and in Dunn. Also, the college has instructional classes at Harnett Correctional Institution.

=== Lee County ===
The Lee Main Campus, which houses the college administration, is located in Sanford, NC. The campus includes the Dennis A. Wicker Civic & Conference Center, which is operated by the college, and the Keller Health Sciences Center. Also, the campus is home to the E. Eugene Moore Manufacturing and Biotech Solutions Center – a one-of-a-kind, world-class education resource focused on addressing the workforce needs of advanced manufacturing and biotechnology. The college also operates the nearby Emergency Services Training Center and has facilities at the Lee County Industrial Park.

== Leadership ==
Dr. Lisa M. Chapman has served as president of Central Carolina Community College since April 1, 2019. With a background in higher education leadership, Dr. Chapman has focused on enhancing student success and community engagement during her tenure.
