= Lee County, North Carolina =

County in North Carolina, United States

- County
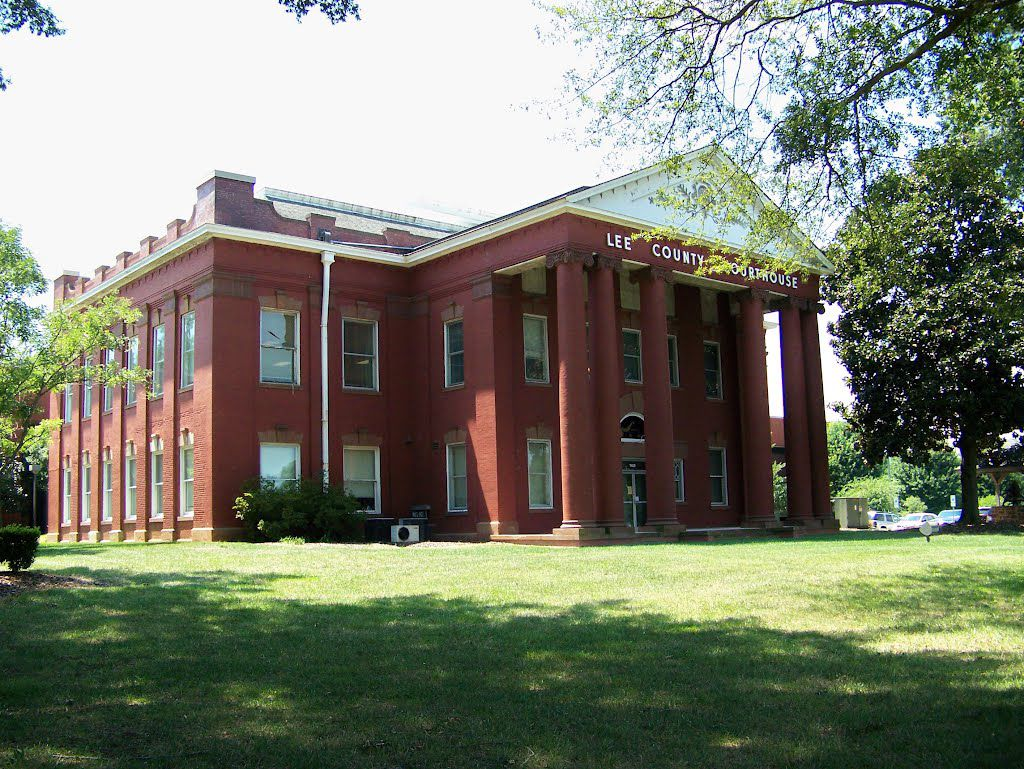
- Lee County Courthouse

- Flag Seal
- Motto: "Committed Today for a Better Tomorrow"
- Location within the U.S. state of North Carolina
- Coordinates: 35.48°N 79.17°W
- Country: United States
- State: North Carolina
- Founded: April 1, 1908
- Named for: Robert E. Lee
- Seat: Sanford
- Largest community: Sanford

Area
  - Total: 259.20 sq mi (671.3 km^{2})
  - Land: 255.06 sq mi (660.6 km^{2})
  - Water: 4.14 sq mi (10.7 km^{2}) 1.60%

Population (2020)
  - Total: 63,285
  - Estimate (2025): 70,258 ▲
  - Density: 281.2/sq mi (108.6/km^{2})
- Time zone: UTC−5 (Eastern)
  - Summer (DST): UTC−4 (EDT)
- ZIP Codes: 27330, 27332
- Area code: 919, 984
- Congressional district: 13th
- Website: www.leecountync.gov

Lee County is a county located in the U.S. state of North Carolina. As of the 2020 census, its population was 63,285. The county seat is Sanford.

Lee County comprises the Sanford, NC micropolitan statistical area, which is a part of the Raleigh-Durham-Cary, NC combined statistical area, which had an estimated population of 2,368,947 in 2023.

== History ==
=== Early history ===
The nature of the Native Americans of the land eventually comprising Lee County is not well known. People of European and African descent settled in the area in the 1740s and '50s. During the American Revolutionary War, the Wilcox Iron Works supplied iron goods for the state's war effort. In the 1850s, the state's first commercial coal mine opened in the community of Egypt. During the American Civil War, the area supplied coal and iron to the forces of the Confederate States of America.

=== Foundation ===
In 1907, residents of Sanford, then in Moore County, began pushing for the creation of a new county to ease the burden of their travel to Moore's seat of Carthage. The North Carolina General Assembly passed a law creating Lee County from portions of Moore and Chatham Counties effective April 1, 1908, pending ratification in a plebiscite by the people living in the proposed county. The referendum was held on July 1, with voters approving the new county 875 to 40. County officials were installed on February 17, 1908. The county courthouse was erected on a site between Sanford and Jonesboro and occupied by county officers in early March 1909.

Lee County's population and economy steadily grew after its creation, fueled by the success of tobacco, furniture, quarrying, brickmaking, and textile industries. In 1947, the cities of Sanford and Jonesboro merged.

=== Modern History ===
As Lee County continued to develop, brickmaking emerged as the dominant powerhouse of the local economy, and by the 1950s, roughly one-tenth of bricks in the United States were produced in Lee County. While brickmaking remains a large part of the county's economy, it has rapidly diversified with the introduction of the manufacturing, higher education, and healthcare industries. In the 21st century, Lee County has grown rapidly due to its stable local economy and its status as a growing suburb of Raleigh and Fayetteville, and it is now one of the fastest growing counties in the state.

== Geography ==
Interactive map of Lee County

According to the U.S. Census Bureau, the county has a total area of 259.20 square miles (671.3 km^{2}), of which 4.14 square miles (10.7 km^{2}) (1.60%) are covered by water.

=== State and local protected areas ===
- Lee Game Land (part)
- White Pines Nature Preserve (part)

=== Major water bodies ===
- Big Governors Creek
- Cape Fear River
- Cypress Creek
- Deep River
- Juniper Creek
- Lake Trace
- Lake Villanow
- Lick Creek
- Little Buffalo Creek
- Little Governors Creek
- Little Pocket Creek
- Pocket Creek
- Roberts Creek

=== Adjacent counties ===
- Chatham County – north
- Harnett County – southeast
- Moore County – southwest

=== Major highways ===
- Future I-685
- US 1 (runs from Key West, FL to Fort Kent, ME)
- US 15 (runs from Walterboro, SC to Painted Post, NY)
- US 421 (runs from Fort Fisher, NC to Michigan City, IN)
- US 421 Bus.
- US 501 (runs from Myrtle Beach, SC to Buena Vista, VA)
- NC 42
- NC 78
- NC 87
- NC 87 Byp.

=== Major infrastructure ===
- Raleigh Executive Jetport

== Demographics ==
Historical population
Census	Pop.	Note	%±
1910	11,376		—
1920	13,400		17.8%
1930	16,996		26.8%
1940	18,743		10.3%
1950	23,522		25.5%
1960	26,561		12.9%
1970	30,467		14.7%
1980	36,718		20.5%
1990	41,374		12.7%
2000	49,040		18.5%
2010	57,866		18.0%
2020	63,285		9.4%
2025 (est.)	70,258	▲	11.0%
U.S. Decennial Census; 1790–1960 1900–1990; 1990–2000 2010 2020

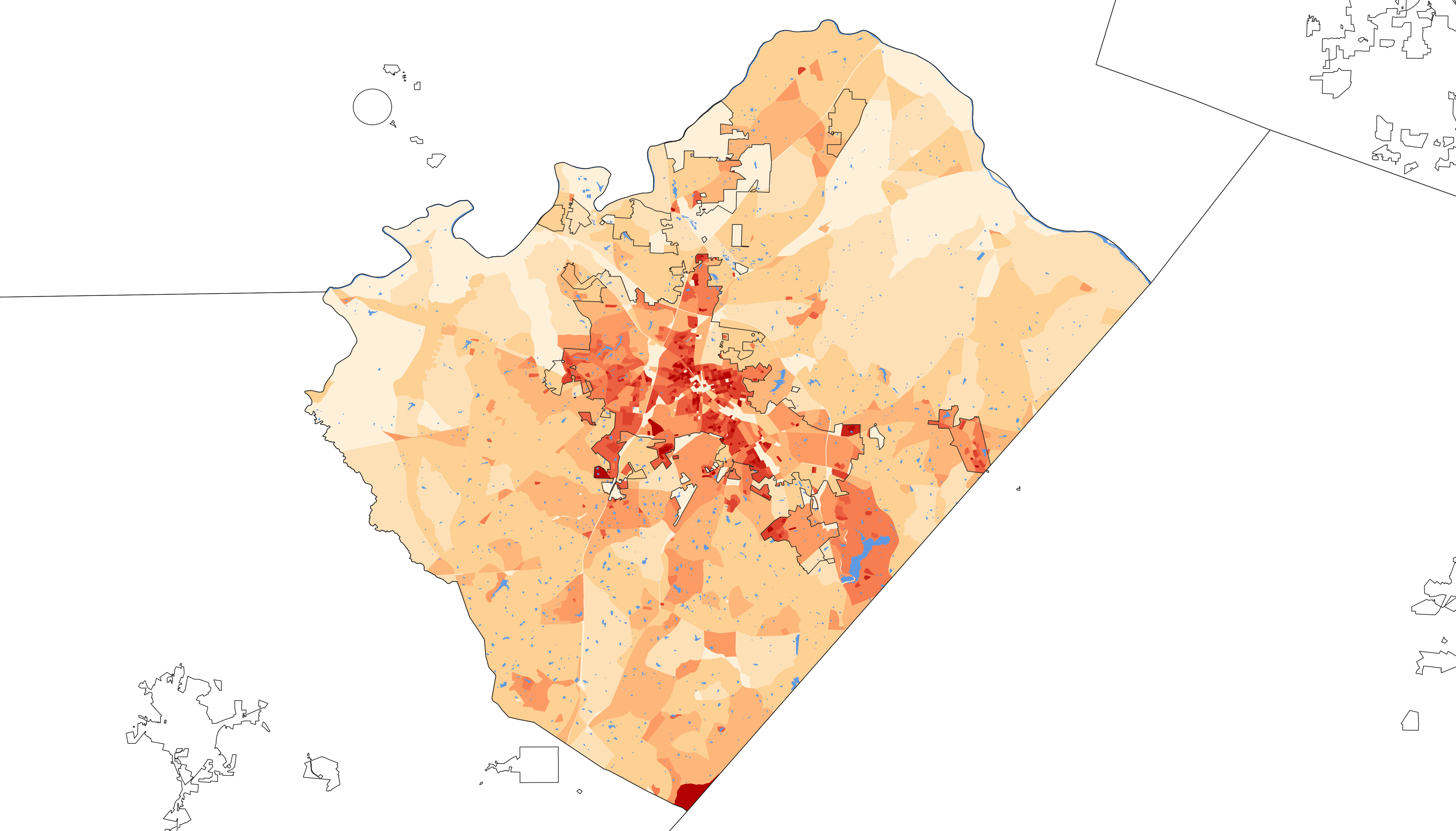
2020 population density of Lee County NC by census block

=== Racial and ethnic composition ===
Lee County, North Carolina – Racial and ethnic composition Note: the US Census treats Hispanic/Latino as an ethnic category. This table excludes Latinos from the racial categories and assigns them to a separate category. Hispanics/Latinos may be of any race.
Race / Ethnicity (NH = Non-Hispanic)	Pop 1980	Pop 1990	Pop 2000	Pop 2010	Pop 2020	% 1980	% 1990	% 2000	% 2010	% 2020
White alone (NH)	28,275	30,928	32,467	34,321	36,055	77.01%	74.75%	66.21%	59.31%	56.97%
Black or African American alone (NH)	8,018	9,310	9,982	11,369	10,701	21.84%	22.50%	20.35%	19.65%	16.91%
Native American or Alaska Native alone (NH)	60	163	180	253	231	0.16%	0.39%	0.37%	0.44%	0.37%
Asian alone (NH)	61	169	323	475	643	0.17%	0.41%	0.66%	0.82%	1.02%
Native Hawaiian or Pacific Islander alone (NH)	x	x	18	13	43	x	x	0.04%	0.02%	0.07%
Other race alone (NH)	4	4	45	80	227	0.01%	0.01%	0.09%	0.14%	0.36%
Multiracial (NH)	x	x	310	779	2,263	x	x	0.63%	1.35%	3.58%
Hispanic or Latino (any race)	300	800	5,715	10,576	13,122	0.82%	1.93%	11.65%	18.28%	20.73%
Total	36,718	41,374	49,040	57,866	63,285	100.00%	100.00%	100.00%	100.00%	100.00%

=== 2020 census ===
As of the 2020 census, the county had a population of 63,285, and a median age of 40.1 years; 23.5% of residents were under 18 and 18.3% were 65 or older. For every 100 females, there were 95.2 males, and for every 100 females 18 and over. there were 92.1 males 18 and over.

Of the 24,575 households in the county, including 15,223 families, 32.1% had children under 18 living in them, 48.1% were married-couple households, 17.2% were households with a male householder and no spouse or partner present, and 28.3% were households with a female householder and no spouse or partner present. About 26.4% of all households were made up of individuals, and 11.8% had someone living alone who was 65 or older.

The racial makeup of the county was 60.7% White, 17.2% Black or African American, 0.8% American Indian and Alaska Native, 1.0% Asian, 0.1% Native Hawaiian and Pacific Islander, 11.7% from some other race, and 8.4% from two or more races. Hispanic or Latino residents of any race comprised 20.7% of the population.

About 57.9% of residents lived in urban areas, while 42.1% lived in rural areas.

The county had 26,583 housing units, of which 7.6% were vacant. Among occupied housing units, 67.1% were owner-occupied and 32.9% were renter-occupied. The homeowner vacancy rate was 1.6% and the rental vacancy rate was 6.7%.

=== 2000 census ===
At the 2000 census, 49,040 people, 18,466 households, and 13,369 families resided in the county. The population density was 191 people per square mile (74 people/km^{2}). The 19,909 housing units had an average density of 77 units per square mile (30 units/km^{2}). The racial makeup of the county was 70.03% White, 20.46% African American, 0.42% Native American, 0.67% Asian, 0.04% Pacific Islander, 7.33% from other races, and 1.06% from two or more races. About 11.65% of the population were Hispanics or Latinos of any race. By 2005, 14.2% of the county population were Latino, 20.2% were African-American, and 64.2% were non-Hispanic whites.

Of the 18,466 households, 33.3% had children under 18 living with them, 54.3% were married couples living together, 13.4% had a female householder with no husband present, and 27.6% were not families. About 23.5% of all households were made up of individuals, and 8.8% had someone living alone who was 65 or older. The average household size was 2.61, and the average family size was 3.05. In the county, the age distribution was 25.7% under 18, 9.0% from 18 to 24, 29.7% from 25 to 44, 22.7% from 45 to 64, and 12.9% who were 65 or older. The median age was 36 years. For every 100 females, there were 97.5 males. For every 100 females 18 and over, there were 95.0 males. The median income in the county for a household was $38,900 and for a family was $45,373. Males had a median income of $32,780 versus $23,660 for females. The per capita income for the county was $19,147. About 9.8% of families and 12.8% of the population were below the poverty line, including 16.5% of those under 18 and 12.2% of those 65 or over.

== Government and politics ==
=== Government ===
Lee County is a member of the regional Triangle J Council of Governments. The county is governed by a seven-member board of county commissioners, elected at-large to serve four-year terms. Terms are staggered so that every two years, three or four commissioners are up for election. The commissioners enact policies such as establishment of the property tax rate, regulation of land use and zoning outside municipal jurisdictions, and adoption of the annual budget. The commissioners appoint a county manager to oversee regular administrative activity of the county government. The commissioners also appoint a county attorney to advise the board on legal matters.

Lee County is represented in the United States House of Representatives as part of North Carolina's 13th congressional district, represented by Republican Brad Knott. It is represented in the United States Senate by Republicans Thom Tillis and Ted Budd. It is represented in the North Carolina House of Representatives as part of North Carolina's 51st House district, represented by Republican John I. Sauls. It is represented in the North Carolina Senate as part of North Carolina's 12th Senate district, represented by Republican Jim Burgin. Lee County lies within the bounds of North Carolina's 12th Prosecutorial District, the 12th Superior Court District, and the 12th District Court District.

Office	Name	Party
Clerk of Court	Susie Thomas	Democrat
Register of Deeds	Kelli Gunter	Democrat
District Attorney	Suzanne Matthews	Republican
Sheriff	Brian Estes	Republican

Office	Name	Party
District I Commissioner	Robert Reives	Democrat
District II Commissioner	Kirk Smith	Republican
District III Commissioner	Andre Knecht	Republican
District IV Commissioner	Taylor Vorbeck	Republican
At-large Commissioner	Mark Lovick	Democrat
At-large Commissioner	Cameron Sharpe	Democrat
At-large Commissioner	Samantha Martin	Republican

=== Politics ===
Lee is a typical "Solid South" county in terms of voting patterns. From its first election in 1908, it voted Democratic by large margins until 1968, except in the 1928 election when anti-Prohibition Catholic Al Smith held the county by single digits. In 1968, Lee's Democratic streak was broken when its electorate chose the American Independent candidate George Wallace. After 1972, Lee has voted Republican in every election except for Jimmy Carter's two elections in 1976 and 1980. As of 2022, 60.4% of the population is registered to vote.

United States presidential election results for Lee County, North Carolina
Year	Republican		Democratic		Third party(ies)	
Year	No.	%	No.	%	No.	%
1912	451	32.85%	862	62.78%	60	4.37%
1916	573	35.22%	1,054	64.78%	0	0.00%
1920	1,143	32.94%	2,327	67.06%	0	0.00%
1924	710	27.80%	1,834	71.81%	10	0.39%
1928	1,416	45.23%	1,715	54.77%	0	0.00%
1932	681	18.15%	3,058	81.50%	13	0.35%
1936	670	15.25%	3,723	84.75%	0	0.00%
1940	527	12.52%	3,682	87.48%	0	0.00%
1944	808	18.98%	3,448	81.02%	0	0.00%
1948	871	20.03%	3,234	74.38%	243	5.59%
1952	2,105	30.99%	4,688	69.01%	0	0.00%
1956	1,948	31.88%	4,163	68.12%	0	0.00%
1960	2,563	35.42%	4,673	64.58%	0	0.00%
1964	2,753	36.79%	4,730	63.21%	0	0.00%
1968	2,586	29.32%	2,524	28.61%	3,711	42.07%
1972	5,836	72.71%	2,024	25.22%	166	2.07%
1976	3,691	41.80%	5,104	57.80%	36	0.41%
1980	4,847	45.84%	5,426	51.31%	301	2.85%
1984	8,198	67.47%	3,925	32.30%	28	0.23%
1988	7,104	62.47%	4,231	37.21%	36	0.32%
1992	6,658	45.42%	5,852	39.92%	2,149	14.66%
1996	7,321	50.04%	6,290	42.99%	1,019	6.97%
2000	9,406	57.77%	6,785	41.67%	92	0.57%
2004	11,834	60.55%	7,657	39.18%	52	0.27%
2008	12,775	53.70%	10,784	45.33%	229	0.96%
2012	13,158	54.28%	10,801	44.56%	280	1.16%
2016	13,712	54.66%	10,469	41.74%	903	3.60%
2020	16,469	56.77%	12,143	41.86%	396	1.37%
2024	17,489	58.14%	12,245	40.71%	347	1.15%

== Communities ==
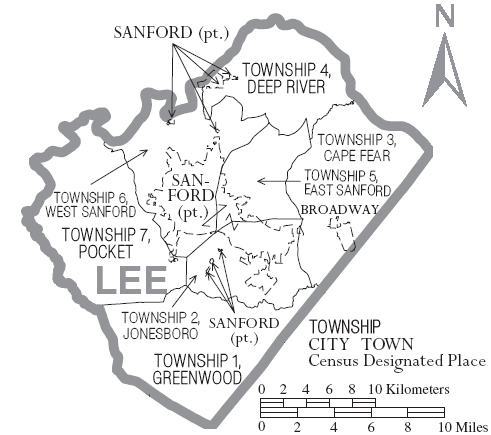
Map of Lee County with municipal and township labels

=== City ===
- Sanford (county seat and largest community)

=== Town ===
- Broadway

=== Unincorporated communities ===
- Blacknel
- Colon
- Cumnock
- Lemon Springs
- Murchisontown
- Osgood
- Pocket
- Swann Station
- Tramway
- White Hill

=== Townships ===
The county is divided into seven townships, which are both numbered and named:

- Township 1, Greenwood
- Township 2, Jonesboro
- Township 3, Cape Fear
- Township 4, Deep River
- Township 5, East Sanford
- Township 6, West Sanford
- Township 7, Pocket

== Education ==
There is one school district, Lee County Schools. The District has 17 schools, including Lee County High School and Southern Lee High School.

== Trivia ==
- The area has historically been one of the leading brick-manufacturing areas in the United States.
- Cotton and tobacco are leading crops in the county.
- The county is divided between the Piedmont in the northern part of the county and the Sandhills in the south.
- Lee County sits in the middle of the Triassic Basin and has the state's most concentrated reserves of oil and natural gas.
- Lee County is also home to the longest covered bridge in North Carolina found along NC 42 near Ole Gilliam Mill Park, North Carolina.

== See also ==
- List of counties in North Carolina
- National Register of Historic Places listings in Lee County, North Carolina
- List of memorials to Robert E. Lee

== Works cited ==
- Corbitt, David Leroy (2000). The formation of the North Carolina counties, 1663-1943 (reprint ed.). Raleigh: North Carolina Division of Archives and History. OCLC 46398241.
