= Rabinovich =

Rabinovich or Rabinovitch (Рабино́вич, רבינוביץ), is a Russian Ashkenazi Jewish surname, Slavic for "son of the rabbi". The Polish/Lithuanian equivalents are Rabinowitz or Rabinowicz.

== People ==
People bearing the surname include:

- Abraham Rabinovich, American historian and journalist
- Abram Rabinovich (1878–1943), Russian chess player
- Adolphe Rabinovitch (1918–1944), American Special Operations Executive agent executed by the Germans in World War II
- Aharon Yariv (born Aharon Rabinovich) (1920–1994), Israeli general and politician
- Alexandre Rabinovitch-Barakovsky (born 1945), Russian-born composer
- Aviva Rabinovich (1927-2007), professor of botany, chief scientist at the Israel Nature and Parks Authority, environmental activist.
- Baruch Yehoshua Yerachmiel Rabinovich (1913–1999), Chassidic Rabbi
- Daniel Rabinovich (1943–2015), Argentine musician and humorist, founding member of Les Luthiers
- Dina Rabinovitch (1963–2007), British journalist and writer
- Frida Schahar-Rabinovich (born 1950), Israeli chess master
- Gabriel A. Rabinovich (born 1969), Argentine biochemist
- Gérard Rabinovitch (born 1948), French philosopher and sociologist
- Ilya Rabinovich (1891–1942), Russian chess player
- Ilya Rabinovich - (born 1965), Moldova-born Dutch and Israeli visual artist
- Itamar Rabinovich (born 1942), Israeli politician and president of Tel Aviv University
- Jack Rabinovitch (1930-2017), Canadian philanthropist
- Louise G. Rabinovitch, psychologist, inventor, and advocate for patient's rights
- Mikhail Rabinovich (1941–2025), Russian-American physicist and neuroscientist
- Moshe Leib Rabinovich (born 1940), Munkacs Rebbe
- Nahum Rabinovich (1928–2020), Israeli rabbi
- Raquel Rabinovich (1929–2025), Argentine-American artist
- Robert Rabinovitch, (born 1943), Canadian public servant
- Roman Rabinovich, Israeli pianist
- Samuel Rabinovitch (1903–1991), British sculptor, artist, singer and wrestler (also known as Sam Rabin)
- Samuel Rabinovich (1909–1988), Soviet radiolocation engineer
- Sholem Aleichem (born Sholem Yakov/Solomon Naumovich Rabinovich) (1859–1916), Russian-Ukrainian Yiddish writer
- Vadim Rabinovich (born 1953), Ukrainian gangman and godfather
- Victor Rabinovitch, Canadian public servant

== Fictional characters ==
- Rabbi Emanuel Rabinovich, non-existent figure cited in antisemitic works
- Russian jokes § Rabinovich, stereotypical Russian Jew

== See also ==
- Rabinowitz
- Rabin
- Rabinow (surname)
