= Rabinowitz =

Rabinowitz (also Rabinowicz) (רבינוביץ), is a Polish-Lithuanian Ashkenazi Jewish surname, Slavic for "son of the rabbi". The Russian equivalents are Rabinovich or Rabinovitch.

It may refer to:

== People ==
- Alan Rabinowitz (1953–2018), US zoologist
- Avraham Yissachar Dov Rabinowicz (1843–1892), Polish, second Radomsker Rebbe
- Azriel Rabinowitz (1905–1941), Lithuanian rabbi & Rosh Yeshiva
- Chaim Rabinowitz (1856–1930), Lithuanian rabbi & Rosh Yeshiva
- David L. Rabinowitz (born 1960), US astronomer
- Deborah Rabinowitz (1947–1987), US ecologist
- Dorothy Rabinowitz (active 1957–2013), US journalist
- Erick Elias Rabinowitz (born 1980), professional name "Erick Elías", Mexican actor
- Gamliel Rabinowitz (active 2005–06), Israeli Rosh Yeshiva
- Gloria Rabinowitz (active 1956–69), Canadian actor
- Harry Rabinowitz, South African-British conductor, composer
- Jacob J. Rabinowitz (1899–1960), US professor of law, emigrant to Israel
- Jay Rabinowitz (film editor) (active 1984 to present), US film editor
- Jay Rabinowitz (jurist) (1927–2001), US chief justice of Alaska Supreme Court (1965–1997)
- Jerome Rabinowitz (1918–98), birth name of US choreographer Jerome Robbins
- Joseph Rabinowitz (1837–1899), Russian founder of first Jewish Christian congregation in Russia.
- Louis Isaac Rabinowitz (1906–1984), British Orthodox rabbi
- Louis M. Rabinowitz (1887–1957), US businessman, philanthropist
- Loren Galler-Rabinowitz (born 1986), US figure skater
- Maurice Rabinowicz (born 1947), Belgian film director, writer
- Moritz Rabinowitz (1887–1942), Norwegian retail merchant, political activist
- Nik Rabinowitz (active 2012), South African comedian, actor, author
- Paul Rabinowitz (born 1939), US mathematician
- Philip Rabinowitz (mathematician) (1926–2006), Israeli mathematician
- Philip Rabinowitz (runner) (1904–2008), South African, fastest 100-year-old to run 100 meters
- Renee Rabinowitz (1934—2020), US-Israeli psychologist, lawyer
- Samuel Jacob Rabinowitz (1857–1921), Lithuanian rabbi
- Shlomo Rabinowicz (1801–1866), Polish, first Radomsker Rebbe
- Shlomo Chanoch Rabinowicz (1882–1942), Polish, fourth Radomsker Rebbe
- Sol Rabinowitz (1924–2013), US businessman, founder of New York City 1950s record label Baton Records
- Steve Rabinowitz (1957-), US political image maker
- Stuart Rabinowitz (active 2001–2020), US university president
- Victor Rabinowitz (1911–2007) US lawyer
- Yechezkel Rabinowicz (1864–1910), Polish, third Radomsker Rebbe
- Yehiel Rabinowitz (born 1939), Israeli sculptor, painter based in France

== Other ==
- United States v. Rabinowitz, 339 U.S. 56 (1950), United States Supreme Court case

== See also ==
- Rabinovich
- Rabinovitch
- Russian jokes: Rabinovich
- Rabin
- Rabinow (surname)
