= Rabin =

Rabin is a Hebrew surname. It originates from the Hebrew word rav meaning Rabbi, or from the name of the specific Rabbi Abin. The most well known bearer of the name was Yitzhak Rabin, prime minister of Israel and Nobel Peace prize Laureate.

== People with surname Rabin ==
- John James Audubon (born Jean Rabin, 1785–1851), American ornithologist
- Beatie Deutsch (née Rabin; born 1989), Haredi Jewish American-Israeli marathon runner
- Eve Queler (née Rabin; born 1931), American conductor
- Al Rabin (1936–2012), American soap opera producer
- Chaim Menachem Rabin (1915–1996), German-Israeli semitic-linguist
- Leah Rabin (1928–2000), first lady of Israel
- Matthew Rabin (born 1963), American professor and researcher in economics
- Michael Rabin (1936–1972), American violin virtuoso
- Michael O. Rabin (1931–2026), Israeli mathematician, computer scientist and Turing Award recipient
- Nathan Rabin (1976), American film and music critic
- Oscar Rabin (1899–1958), Latvian-born British band leader and musician
- Oscar Rabin (1928–2018), Russian painter
- Ronald J. Rabin (born 1932), North Carolina senator
- Samuel Rabin (1903–1991), British sculptor, artist, singer and wrestler
- Samuel Rabin (1905–1993), New York judge
- Trevor Rabin (born 1954), rock guitarist, member of the English band Yes (1983–94), and film soundtrack composer
- Yitzhak Rabin (1922–1995), prime minister of Israel

== See also ==
- Rabinow (surname)
- Rabinowitz (surname)
- Rabin automaton
- Rabin cryptosystem
- Rabin–Karp string search algorithm
- Rabin Square (Kikar Rabin)
- Mechinat Rabin pre-army preparatory program
- Miller–Rabin primality test
- Rąbiń, a village in Poland
