= Donald Davis (North Carolina Republican politician) =

American politician (1930–2015)

Donald Spencer Davis
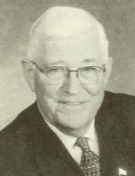
- Davis in the 1999 legislative manual

Member of the North Carolina House of Representatives from the 19th district
- In office January 1, 1995 – January 1, 2003
- Preceded by: Clarence Poe Stewart; Bobby Ray Hall
- Succeeded by: David Lewis (Redistricting)

Personal details
- Born: January 19, 1930 Hannibal, Missouri, U.S.
- Died: March 6, 2015 (aged 85) Erwin, North Carolina, U.S.
- Party: Republican

Donald Spencer Davis (January 19, 1930 – March 6, 2015) was an American politician. He served as a Republican member of the North Carolina House of Representatives for District 19 from 1995 to 2003. In 2001, he forwarded an email to fellow legislators which read, "Two things made this country great: White men and Christianity". Davis later apologized. He died at his home in Erwin, North Carolina, on March 6, 2015, at the age of 85.

== Electoral history ==
=== 2012 ===
North Carolina Senate 12th district Republican primary election, 2012
Party	Candidate	Votes	%
Republican	Don Davis	5,709	37.91%
Republican	Ronald Rabin	4,195	27.86%
Republican	Tim McNeill	3,173	21.07%
Republican	Daniel Glover	1,983	13.17%
Total votes		15,060	100%

North Carolina Senate 12th district Republican primary run-off election, 2012
Party	Candidate	Votes	%
Republican	Ronald Rabin	2,038	52.30%
Republican	Don Davis	1,859	47.70%
Total votes		3,897	100%

=== 2000 ===
North Carolina House of Representatives 19th district general election, 2000
Party	Candidate	Votes	%
Democratic	Leslie Cox (incumbent)	21,359	27.54%
Republican	Don Davis (incumbent)	20,817	26.84%
Republican	Bobby Ray Hall	18,077	23.31%
Democratic	Larry C. Upchurch	17,310	22.32%
Total votes		77,563	100%
Democratic hold			
Republican hold			

== See also ==
- List of Mitt Romney 2012 presidential campaign endorsements

North Carolina House of Representatives
Preceded by Clarence Poe Stewart; Bobby Ray Hall	Member of the North Carolina House of Representatives from the 19th District; 1995–2003; Served alongside: Willis Donald Brown, Bobby Ray Hall, Leslie Cox	Succeeded by Danny McComas
