= North Carolina's 53rd House district =

American legislative district

North Carolina's 53rd State House of Representatives district
Representative
Howard Penny Jr. R–Coats
- Demographics: 65% White; 14% Black; 15% Hispanic; 1% Asian; 4% Multiracial
- Population (2024): 88,875

North Carolina's 53rd House district is one of 120 districts in the North Carolina House of Representatives. It has been represented by Republican Howard Penny Jr. since 2020.

== Geography ==
Since 2023, the district has included parts of Harnett and Johnston counties. The district overlaps with the 10th and 12th Senate districts.

== District officeholders since 1983 ==
Representative	Party	Dates	Notes	Counties
District created January 1, 1983.
Jeff Enloe Jr. (Franklin)	Democratic	January 1, 1983 – January 1, 1989	Redistricted from the 45th district.	1983–1993; All of Cherokee, Clay, and Macon counties. Part of Graham County.
Marty Kimsey (Franklin)	Republican	January 1, 1989 – January 1, 1993		1983–1993; All of Cherokee, Clay, and Macon counties. Part of Graham County.
Thomas Jenkins (Franklin)	Democratic	January 1, 1993 – January 1, 1995		1993–2003; All of Cherokee, Clay, and Macon counties. Part of Jackson County.
James Carpenter (Otto)	Republican	January 1, 1995 – May 3, 2000	Resigned.	1993–2003; All of Cherokee, Clay, and Macon counties. Part of Jackson County.
Vacant		May 3, 2000 – May 5, 2000		1993–2003; All of Cherokee, Clay, and Macon counties. Part of Jackson County.
Roger West (Marble)	Republican	May 5, 2000 – January 1, 2003	Appointed to finish Carpenter's term. Redistricted to the 120th district.	1993–2003; All of Cherokee, Clay, and Macon counties. Part of Jackson County.
David Lewis (Dunn)	Republican	January 1, 2003 – August 20, 2020	Resigned.	2003–2023; Part of Harnett County.
Vacant		August 20, 2020 – September 17, 2020		2003–2023; Part of Harnett County.
Howard Penny Jr. (Coats)	Republican	September 17, 2020 – Present	Appointed to finish Lewis's term.	2003–2023; Part of Harnett County.
Howard Penny Jr. (Coats)	Republican	September 17, 2020 – Present	Appointed to finish Lewis's term.	2023–Present; Parts of Harnett and Johnston counties.

== Election results ==
=== 2024 ===
North Carolina House of Representatives 53rd district general election, 2024
Party	Candidate	Votes	%
Republican	Howard Penny Jr. (incumbent)	28,867	62.93%
Democratic	Kevin Thurman	17,007	37.07%
Total votes		45,874	100%
Republican hold			

=== 2022 ===
North Carolina House of Representatives 53rd district Republican primary election, 2022
Party	Candidate	Votes	%
Republican	Howard Penny Jr. (incumbent)	5,142	63.25%
Republican	Brian Hawley	2,988	36.75%
Total votes		8,130	100%

North Carolina House of Representatives 53rd district general election, 2022
Party	Candidate	Votes	%
Republican	Howard Penny Jr. (incumbent)	22,118	67.14%
Democratic	Kevin G. Thurman	10,824	32.86%
Total votes		32,942	100%
Republican hold			

=== 2020 ===
North Carolina House of Representatives 53rd district Democratic primary election, 2020
Party	Candidate	Votes	%
Democratic	Sally Weeks Benson	4,045	65.86%
Democratic	John C. Fitzpatrick Sr.	2,097	34.14%
Total votes		6,142	100%

North Carolina House of Representatives 53rd district general election, 2020
Party	Candidate	Votes	%
Republican	Howard Penny Jr. (incumbent)	26,228	60.97%
Democratic	Sally Weeks Benson	15,129	35.17%
Libertarian	Zach Berly	1,658	3.85%
Total votes		43,015	100%
Republican hold			

=== 2018 ===
North Carolina House of Representatives 53rd district Democratic primary election, 2018
Party	Candidate	Votes	%
Democratic	Richard Chapman	1,640	77.84%
Democratic	Alan Longman	467	22.16%
Total votes		2,107	100%

North Carolina House of Representatives 53rd district general election, 2018
Party	Candidate	Votes	%
Republican	David Lewis (incumbent)	17,201	62.99%
Democratic	Richard Chapman	10,108	37.01%
Total votes		27,309	100%
Republican hold			

=== 2016 ===
North Carolina House of Representatives 53rd district Republican primary election, 2016
Party	Candidate	Votes	%
Republican	David Lewis (incumbent)	6,007	78.64%
Republican	Chuck Levorse	1,632	21.36%
Total votes		7,639	100%

North Carolina House of Representatives 53rd district general election, 2016
Party	Candidate	Votes	%
Republican	David Lewis (incumbent)	19,548	60.66%
Democratic	Jon Blum	12,678	39.34%
Total votes		32,226	100%
Republican hold			

=== 2014 ===
North Carolina House of Representatives 53rd district Democratic primary election, 2014
Party	Candidate	Votes	%
Democratic	Susan Byerly	2,356	81.30%
Democratic	Thomas Ellis II	542	18.70%
Total votes		2,898	100%

North Carolina House of Representatives 53rd district general election, 2014
Party	Candidate	Votes	%
Republican	David Lewis (incumbent)	10,966	55.74%
Democratic	Susan Byerly	8,707	44.26%
Total votes		19,673	100%
Republican hold			

=== 2012 ===
North Carolina House of Representatives 53rd district Democratic primary election, 2012
Party	Candidate	Votes	%
Democratic	Joe E. Langley	3,710	64.34%
Democratic	Thomas E. Ellis II	2,056	35.66%
Total votes		5,766	100%

North Carolina House of Representatives 53rd district general election, 2012
Party	Candidate	Votes	%
Republican	David Lewis (incumbent)	17,365	56.50%
Democratic	Joe E. Langley	13,370	43.50%
Total votes		30,735	100%
Republican hold			

=== 2010 ===
North Carolina House of Representatives 53rd district Democratic primary election, 2010
Party	Candidate	Votes	%
Democratic	Abraham Oudeh	1,696	56.29%
Democratic	Thomas E. Ellis II	1,317	43.71%
Total votes		3,013	100%

North Carolina House of Representatives 53rd district general election, 2010
Party	Candidate	Votes	%
Republican	David Lewis (incumbent)	13,533	66.61%
Democratic	Abraham Oudeh	6,784	33.39%
Total votes		20,317	100%
Republican hold			

=== 2008 ===
North Carolina House of Representatives 53rd district general election, 2008
Party	Candidate	Votes	%
Republican	David Lewis (incumbent)	16,135	52.79%
Democratic	Joseph Lindsey "Joe" Tart	14,431	47.21%
Total votes		30,566	100%
Republican hold			

=== 2006 ===
North Carolina House of Representatives 53rd district general election, 2006
Party	Candidate	Votes	%
Republican	David Lewis (incumbent)	7,763	53.14%
Democratic	Frank Stewart	6,846	46.86%
Total votes		14,609	100%
Republican hold			

=== 2004 ===
North Carolina House of Representatives 53rd district general election, 2004
Party	Candidate	Votes	%
Republican	David Lewis (incumbent)	14,633	58.89%
Democratic	Louise Taylor	10,217	41.11%
Total votes		24,850	100%
Republican hold			

=== 2002 ===
North Carolina House of Representatives 53rd district Democratic primary election, 2002
Party	Candidate	Votes	%
Democratic	Larry C. Upchurch	2,543	46.25%
Democratic	Sam Stephenson	2,301	41.85%
Democratic	N. Carnell Robinson	654	11.90%
Total votes		5,498	100%

North Carolina House of Representatives 53rd district Republican primary election, 2002
Party	Candidate	Votes	%
Republican	David Lewis	1,690	53.94%
Republican	Teddy Byrd	1,443	46.06%
Total votes		3,133	100%

North Carolina House of Representatives 53rd district general election, 2002
Party	Candidate	Votes	%
Republican	David Lewis	9,672	61.77%
Democratic	Larry C. Upchurch	5,987	38.23%
Total votes		15,659	100%
Republican hold			

=== 2000 ===
North Carolina House of Representatives 53rd district general election, 2000
Party	Candidate	Votes	%
Republican	Roger West (incumbent)	16,842	60.77%
Democratic	W.C. "Sonny" Burrell	10,873	39.23%
Total votes		27,715	100%
Republican hold			
