= Kaiserhofstraße 12 =

1978 memoir by Valentin Senger

- First edition
- Author: Valentin Senger
- Publisher: Schöffling & Co.
- Publication date: 1978

Kaiserhofstraße 12 (published in English under the title The Invisible Jew) is a memoir by the German author Valentin Senger (1918–1997), who was born in Frankfurt to Russian-born Jewish parents. Originally published in German in 1978, it depicts his childhood at Kaiserhofstraße in central Frankfurt during the Weimar Republic and the Nazi era, and how his Jewish family survived the entire Nazi era undetected in the middle of Frankfurt with the help of several non-Jewish friends and neighbours at Kaiserhofstraße, sympathetic public officials, his mother's creativity and a good portion of luck. Senger was 14 years old when the Nazis came to power.

Senger's parents had fled Czarist Russia because they were wanted by the Czarist Secret Police for revolutionary activities, and moved into Kaiserhofstraße in 1911 after a several-year long odyssey. In Frankfurt they changed their name from Rabisanowitsch to Senger. The Sengers were liberal Jews who only occasionally attended the synagogue and who did not observe all customs of Judaism. Valentin was circumcised, however, and the family maintained their contact with the city's Jewish institutions until the late 1930s.

Senger writes that the local police sergeant Otto Kaspar greatly helped the family by falsifying public records and by protecting the family from being found out at significant personal risk. The Senger family's Jewish background was also known to Valentin's friends and classmates, and to most neighbours at Kaiserhofstraße, but the family was never reported by any of them. When Valentin and his brother were conscripted into the army, the military doctor discovered that they were circumcised, but said nothing of it. Valentin's employer and non-Jewish girlfriend also knew he was Jewish.

The novel is named for the address where his family lived, Kaiserhofstraße 12 (50.115361°N 8.675000°E). Senger describes Kaiserhofstraße as a street of "artists, painters and actors and especially singers, who lived there—the opera house wasn't far away and most of our singers were members of the company. They gave our street a free-and-easy, sometimes almost wicked character."

The novel was adapted into a motion picture by Hessischer Rundfunk in 1980, and was also published in English in 1980. The book was selected for the inaugural Frankfurt One City One Book festival in 2010, leading to renewed interest, and the book became a bestseller. The book has been compared to The Diary of Anne Frank.

== The address Kaiserhofstraße 12 ==
In the 1960s, a parking garage, Parkhaus Börse, was built at Kaiserhofstraße 12. There has been recent debate over replacing the parking garage with a high-end retail and office building with an underground parking garage instead, or renovating its façade. On the roof of Kaiserhofstraße 12, there is a popular mediterranean restaurant and bar during the summer, the Long Island Summer Lounge, founded by the Jewish Frankfurt real estate businessman Ardi Goldman in 2007.
