= Lists of Jewish surnames =

List of Jewish surnames may refer to the following:

- List of Ashkenazi Jewish surnames
- List of Sephardic Jewish surnames
