= Samuel Rabinovitch =

Samuel Rabinovitch could refer to:

- Samuel Rabin (artist), born Samuel Rabinovitch
- Samuel Rabinovitch, Canadian physician, the focus of the Days of Shame strike
- Samuil Rabinovich, Soviet engineer
