= Fred Smith (North Carolina politician) =

American politician from North Carolina (born 1942)

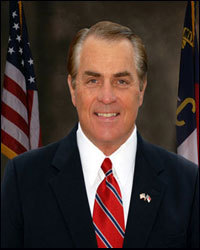

Member of the North Carolina Senate from the 12th district
- In office January 1, 2003 – January 1, 2009
- Preceded by: Allen Wellons (redistricting)
- Succeeded by: David Rouzer

Personal details
- Born: March 27, 1942 (age 84) Raleigh, North Carolina, U.S.
- Party: Republican
- Spouse: Virginia Reid Smith
- Children: 5
- Education: Needham B. Broughton High School
- Alma mater: Wake Forest University

Military service
- Branch/service: United States Army
- Rank: Captain

Fred Smith (born March 27, 1942) is a North Carolina politician who served in the North Carolina Senate and ran for Governor of North Carolina in 2008.

== Early life and education ==
Smith was raised in Raleigh, North Carolina. His father was a teacher and coach at an orphanage, and his mother was a homemaker. While attending Raleigh's Needham B. Broughton High School, Smith earned a football scholarship to attend Wake Forest University. Subsequently, he attended Wake Forest University School of Law, where he graduated with honors in 1966.

Smith is married to Virginia Reid Smith, is father to five children, and is grandfather to seven children. The Smith family is active in the First Baptist Church of Clayton, where he has been a Sunday school teacher.

== Military and business career ==
Smith served as a captain in the U.S. Army JAG Corps for four years after law school. In the years that followed, Smith became a lawyer and homebuilder. Smith's businesses employ more than 600 people in Wake and Johnston counties. The largest of those companies is paving company CC Mangum, of which he is the CEO. Smith also created the Fred Smith Company, which builds homes and constructs golf courses and athletic clubs. Smith touts himself as a CEO, not a politician, who deals with "straight talk and a clear vision."

== Political career ==
Smith was elected in 2000 as a Johnston County commissioner. In 2002, he was elected to the first of 3 terms in the state Senate, representing the Johnston and Wayne counties.

Smith argued for a critical east–west transportation corridor. He was a primary sponsor of North Carolina Amendment 1, an amendment to the Constitution of North Carolina which would define marriage as between one man and one woman.

Smith was heavily criticized by the Democratic Party, including criticisms from then-state party chairman Jerry Meek, as being an absentee Senator, because Smith missed over 300 votes in 2007, which was over a quarter of all possible voting opportunities.

In 2007, Smith became a candidate for Governor. The office was coming open as a result of the departure of term-limited incumbent, Mike Easley. During his gubernatorial campaign, Smith physically visited all 100 North Carolina counties in nine months and 18 days, holding a barbecue dinner in each county. Barbecue dinners, known as the "Fred Smith for Governor BBQ Statewide Tour", started in Haywood County on Thursday, August 2, 2007, and ended on Tuesday, March 18, 2008, in Pasquotank County.

Smith lost the 2008 Republican primary to Charlotte Mayor Pat McCrory. Official primary election results show Smith won 66 counties but out of a total of 504,973 votes, Smith lost the popular vote to Pat McCrory by 45,975 votes.

On May 6, 2008, Smith endorsed Pat McCrory, saying, "I have pledged my full support to Pat McCrory to do whatever is in my power to help elect a Republican governor in November to change the culture in Raleigh and fix our broken government." McCrory was not elected in 2008, but was elected in 2012. After taking office in 2013, McCrory appointed Smith to the North Carolina Economic Development Board.

North Carolina Senate
Preceded by Virginia Foxx; Phil Berger	Member of the North Carolina Senate from the 12th district 2003–2009	Succeeded by David Rouzer
