= Jim Burgin =

American politician

Senator Jim Burgin
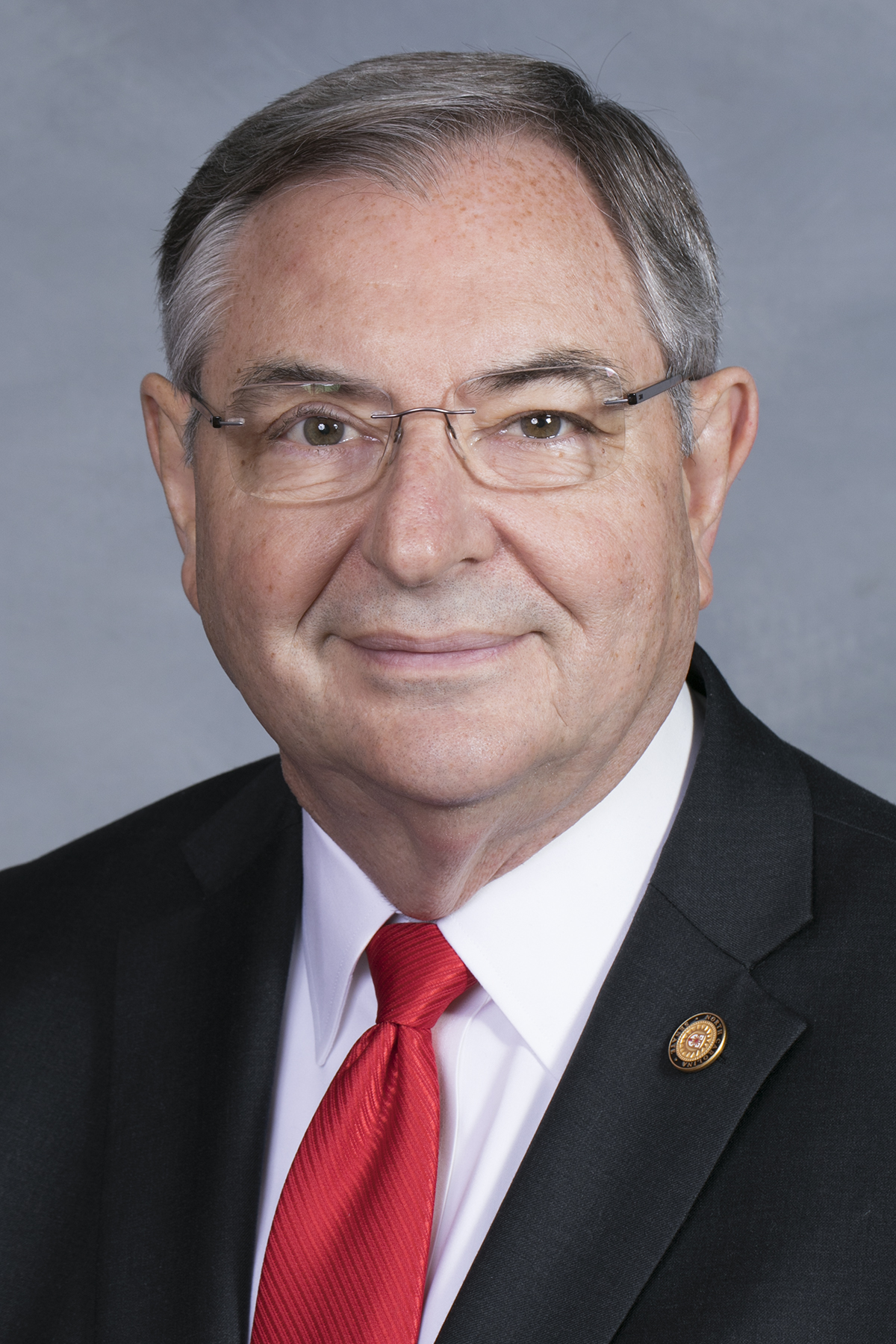

Member of the North Carolina Senate from the 12th district
- Incumbent
- Assumed office January 1, 2019
- Preceded by: Ronald Rabin

Member of the Harnett County Board of Commissioners from the 3rd District
- In office 2008–2016
- Succeeded by: Howard Penny Jr.

Personal details
- Born: James Andrew Burgin; May 20, 1956 (age 70) Knoxville, Tennessee, U.S.
- Party: Republican
- Spouse: Ann
- Children: 3
- Education: University of Tennessee (BS)
- Occupation: businessman

James Andrew "Jim" Burgin (born May 20, 1956) is a Republican member of the North Carolina State Senate, representing the 12th district. He was elected in the 2018 elections. Burgin previously served on the Harnett County Board of Commissioners.

== Political positions ==
Burgin supports Medicaid expansion, one of only a few Republicans in the North Carolina General Assembly to do so. During the 2021-2022 session, Burgin and Sen. Kevin Corbin announced they were working on a bill to do so.

== Committee assignments ==
=== 2025-2026 session ===
- Appropriations - Health and Human Services (chair)
- Health Care (chair)
- Agriculture, Energy, and Environment
- Appropriations/Base Budget
- Finance
- Pensions, Retirement and Aging
- State and Local Government

=== 2021-2022 session ===
- Appropriations - Health and Human Services (chair)
- Health Care (chair)
- Agriculture, Energy, and Environment
- Commerce and Insurance
- Pensions, Retirement and Aging
- Transportation

=== 2019-2020 session ===
- Appropriations - Health and Human Services
- Health Care
- Agriculture, Energy, and Environment
- State and Local Government

== Electoral history ==
=== 2024 ===
North Carolina Senate 12th district general election, 2024
Party	Candidate	Votes	%
Republican	Jim Burgin (incumbent)	57,151	61.61%
Democratic	Tanya White Anderson	35,611	38.39%
Total votes		92,762	100%
Republican hold			

=== 2022 ===
North Carolina Senate 12th district general election, 2022
Party	Candidate	Votes	%
Republican	Jim Burgin (incumbent)	36,304	63.45%
Democratic	Richard Chapman	20,914	36.55%
Total votes		57,218	100%
Republican hold			

=== 2020 ===
North Carolina Senate 12th district general election, 2020
Party	Candidate	Votes	%
Republican	Jim Burgin (incumbent)	57,295	60.84%
Democratic	John Kirkman	36,875	39.16%
Total votes		94,170	100%
Republican hold			

=== 2018 ===
North Carolina Senate 12th district general election, 2018
Party	Candidate	Votes	%
Republican	Jim Burgin	34,931	60.00%
Democratic	Jean Sivoli	23,290	40.00%
Total votes		58,221	100%
Republican hold			

=== 2012 ===
Harnett County Board of Commissioners 3rd district Republican primary election, 2012
Party	Candidate	Votes	%
Republican	Jim Burgin (incumbent)	1,278	54.04%
Republican	Howard Penny Jr.	1,087	45.96%
Total votes		2,365	100%

Harnett County Board of Commissioners 3rd district general election, 2012
Party	Candidate	Votes	%
Republican	Jim Burgin (incumbent)	5,566	73.47%
Independent	Daniel Glover	2,010	26.53%
Total votes		7,576	100%
Republican hold			

=== 2008 ===
Harnett County Board of Commissioners 3rd district Republican primary election, 2008
Party	Candidate	Votes	%
Republican	Jim Burgin	493	42.03%
Republican	Howard Penny Jr.	310	26.43%
Republican	Ricky W. Blackmon	190	16.20%
Republican	Chuck Levorse	180	15.35%
Total votes		1,173	100%

Harnett County Board of Commissioners 3rd district general election, 2008
Party	Candidate	Votes	%
Republican	Jim Burgin	4,076	52.28%
Democratic	Frances Gregory Avery	3,720	47.72%
Total votes		7,796	100%
Republican hold			

North Carolina Senate
Preceded by Ronald Rabin	Member of the North Carolina Senate from the 12th district 2019-Present	Incumbent
