= Valentin Senger =

- Born: 28 December 1918; Frankfurt, Hesse, Germany
- Died: 4 September 1997 (aged 78); Frankfurt
- Occupations: Author and journalist

Valentin Senger (28 December 1918, in Frankfurt – 4 September 1997, in Frankfurt) was a German writer and journalist. He is best known for his 1978 autobiography, Kaiserhofstraße 12, recounting his childhood at the central Frankfurt street Kaiserhofstraße as the son of Russian-Jewish immigrants who survived the Nazi era undetected. The book appeared in English in 1980 under the title The Invisible Jew, and was adapted into a motion picture in the same year.

== Works ==
- Die Brücke von Kassel. Verlag Neues Leben, Berlin 1954
- Am seidenen Faden. Verlag Neues Leben, Berlin 1956
- Kaiserhofstraße 12. Darmstadt/Neuwied 1978, Schöffling & Co., Frankfurt am Main 2010 ISBN 978-3-89561-485-9
- Kurzer Frühling. Frankfurt/Main, 1984
- (with Klaus Meier-Ude): Die jüdischen Friedhöfe in Frankfurt/Main. 3. ed., Frankfurt/M 2004 (first ed. 1985)
- Einführung in die Sozialpolitik. Soziale Sicherheit für alle. Reinbek bei Hamburg, Mai 1970
- Die Buchsweilers. Frankfurt/Main 1994 (first ed. Hamburg und Zürich 1991)
- Das Frauenbad und andere jüdische Geschichten. Munich 1994
- Der Heimkehrer. Eine Verwunderung über die Nachkriegszeit. First ed. Munich 1995
- Die rote Turnhose und andere Fahnengeschichten. Munich 1997

== Film ==
- Kaiserhofstraße 12 (dir. Rainer Wolffhardt, 1980), with Christoph Eichhorn
