= Ilya Rabinovich (artist) =

Israeli visual artist and photographer (born 1965)

Ilya Rabinovich (Hebrew: איליה רבינוביץ; born 1965) is a Moldova-born Dutch and Israeli visual artist and photographer based in Amsterdam, where he has lived since 1998. His photographs of the interior of public institutions, most of them of national museums, were primarily taken in Moldova and Israel. A detached documentary manner characterizes his works. He probes how the past shapes the present, how the individual and state memories are molded, and the approaches the establishment facilitates to cope with its controversial past to reinvent itself and present a venerated national identity.

== Biography ==
Ilya Rabinovich was born in Chișinău, Moldova (Former Soviet Union), and immigrated with his family to Israel in 1973 when he was eight years old He graduated in Fine Arts, Bezalel Academy of Arts and Design in Jerusalem in 1994. In 1995–96, the Ministry of Education, Culture and Sport in Israel awarded him the Prize for a Young Artist. 1998 to 1999, he was artist-in-residence at the Rijksakademie van beeldende kunsten, Amsterdam, where he has lived and created ever since.

== Artistic Themes ==
Rabinovich said in an interview: "I have lived in many places and experienced what might therefore be considered a ‘fragmented’ life. My photographs spring from my desire to bring these fragments together through introspection, reflection, and projection."

== Public Institutions and Identity (1993-1996) ==
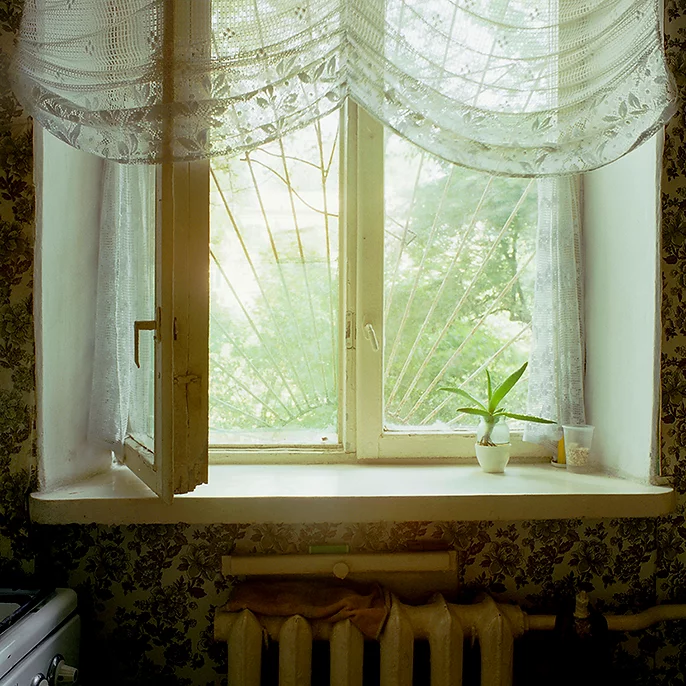
Johannesburg-Kishniev project, Kishniev 1998

From 1993 to 1996, Rabinovich created a series of typological photography projects under the title 'Works coordinated in advance,' which portrayed the interiors of public institutions, including museums, psychiatric hospitals, and schools.

== Ilya Rabinovich: Places 1993–2006 ==
Rabinovich's photographs have been taken in Moldavia, Israel, Germany, Greece, Mexico, Netherlands, and Russia for thirteen years. The project's target was to bestow the audience with an intimate attachment to Rabinovich's work, addressing the sense of alienation often experienced in traditional exhibition formats. Curator Marianne Brouwer deems that Rabinovich's technique conjures a deep understanding of estrangement and exclusion, capturing the essence of exile as an external and internal condition and distinguishing his work from other postmodern photography patterns.

== Museutopia (2008) ==
The Museutopia project germinated out of Rabinovich's journey to delve into his birthplace roots in Moldova, which evolved into research into Moldova's past. Starting in 2008, he visited national museums modified after the Dissolution of the Soviet Union in 1991 and Moldova's independence. The themes of the museums have changed, but they used the same display techniques as during Communism. Rabinovich aimed to divulge the context in which the museum exhibitions were done. He looks for archival photographs of the museums from the ideological soviet era and juxtaposes them with his pictures from the same museums today. By that, she tried to probe how Moldova copes with its communist memories, distances herself from her grim past, and creates a new identity that is incompatible with her being part of her Eastern Bloc.

== Museutopia, A Photographic Research book (2012) ==
The book presents 135 photographs by Rabinovich, taken in 2008 from seven of Moldova's national museums. The photographs are accompanied by elucidated captions, an editorial article, two interviews with the artist, and two essays. Serguei Alex Oushakine from Princeton University wrote in Ab Imperio: “It offers us an important glimpse into a process of active manufacturing of the past by tracing a dizzying transition from "a Communist monoculture" to the chaotic Bricolage of post-Communism.... “These photos are as informative as they are dispassionate and distant… to convey a sense of documentary objectivity, the photographer heavily relies on front- and three-quarters shots that present museums' interiors with almost anatomic precision.” “It is precisely this conflation, this amalgamation of two planes, that makes Rabinovich's project both interesting and important. The personal and the political become inseparable here. Yet this amalgamation is of a peculiar sort. The two planes are brought together by their profound embeddedness in the operation of historical erasure...” Ludmila D. Cojocaru, Moldova State University, wrote in Romanian Cultural History Review: “The well crafted design of the book and the sensitive approach of this art-project can serve, … both as source for new knowledge accretion as well as a resource for building new studies.”

== The "Museutopia Israeli Military Museums“ (2013-2015) ==
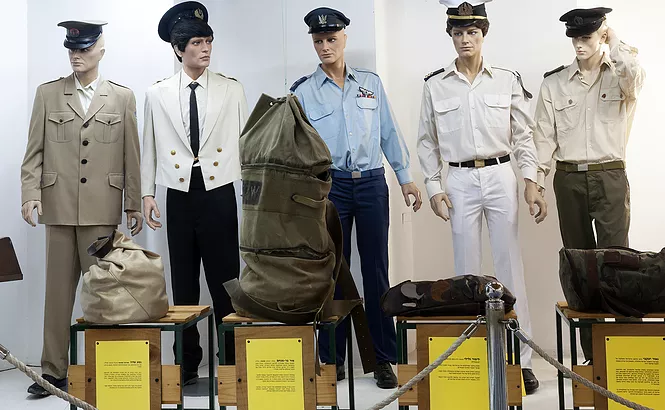
IDF Equipment Center Pavilion presents the development of personal articles and non-combat equipment's chain of supplies.

In a solo exhibition in The Israeli Center for Digital Art (Hebrew Wikipedia), Holon, Israel, Rabinovich focuses on nine of Israel's military museums. In 40 photographs, he documents how the museum staff chose to display the narratives with which they undertake. It presented two kinds of photographs: First, a general outlook of the locations, and second, close-ups of exhibits. Noa Roei suggests that Rabinovich's work exposes the tensions between the undisguised historical narratives and the underlying contradictions, particularly in how these institutions manage the inclusion and exclusion of specific identities within the national discourse.

== Selected Solo exhibitions ==
- 2002 - Parking places Berlin 2001, ESSL Collection (German Wikipedia). Vienna, Austria.
- 2003 - Parking places Berlin 2001, Herzliya Museum of Contemporary Art, Herzliya, Israel. Curator: Dalia Levin.
- 2008 - Places 1993–2006, Apt Gallery and Hiša fotografije (House of Photograph), Urban Municipality of Novo Mesto, Slovenia.
- 2010 - Rear window installation, MB Art Agency, Amsterdam.
- 2012 – Book Presentation, Stedelijk Museum Bureau Amsterdam (SMBA).
- 2015 - Museutopia: The Moldovan chapter and Military museums in Israel, The Israeli Center for Digital Art (Hebrew Wikipedia), Holon, Israel.
- 2024 - Revisiting Museutopia, The Herzliya Artists' Residence.

== Selected Group exhibitions ==
- 1995 - Young Artist's Prize, Artist's House (Hebrew Wikipedia) Tel-Aviv Israel.
- 1996 - Works coordinated in Advance in Living Machines – Architecture of Visibility, a tree locations exhibition – Beit-Hamudim, The Gallery in Borochov, and Camera Obscura Gallery, Tel-Aviv, Israel.
- 1997 - Double Exposure The Anglo-Israeli Photographic Awards, Bograshov Gallery, Tel Aviv.
- 1998 - Works coordinated in Advance, Umwelten, Herzliya Museum of Contemporary Art, Herzliya, Israel.
- 1998 - Bamot Israeli Contemporary Art. Jewish Museum Vienna.
- 1999 – 2000 - Not to be looked at Art Focus- Biennial, Israel Museum, Jerusalem, Israel. Curator: Sarit Shapira.
- 2001 - Urban Myths, The Israeli Centre for Digital Art, Holon, Israel.
- 2002 - Parking places Berlin 2001, ESSL Collection Vienna, Austria.
- 2008 - Eventually We'll Die: Young Art in Israel of the Nineties. Herzliya Museum of Contemporary Art, Herzliya, Israel.
- 2008 – Tripel Knesset, Never Looked Better, Contemporary Artists Respond to the Leni and Herbert Sonnenfeld Photo Collection. Anu – Museum of the Jewish People. Curators: Galit Eilat and Eyal Danon.
- 2009 - Muziotopia, Subliminal Dialogs, Made in Arnhem, Museum Arnhem.
- 2010 - The Old Man: David Ben-Gurion and His Legacy in the Mirror of Israeli Art. Avraham Baron Gallery, Ben-Gurion University of the Negev, Beer Sheva. Curator: Haim Maor.
- 2015 - Muziotopia, Der Fremde in Mir, Stedelijk Museum Assen Hedendaagse, Kunst Assen.
- 2016 - Museutopia Military Museums in Israel project 10’Th Arte Laguna Prize, Arsenale, Venice, Italy.

== Public Collections ==
- Stedelijk Museum Amsterdam. Stedelijk Museum Amsterdam.
- Essl Museum (German Wikipedia).
- De Nederlandsche Bank.
