= David Rouzer =

American politician (born 1972)

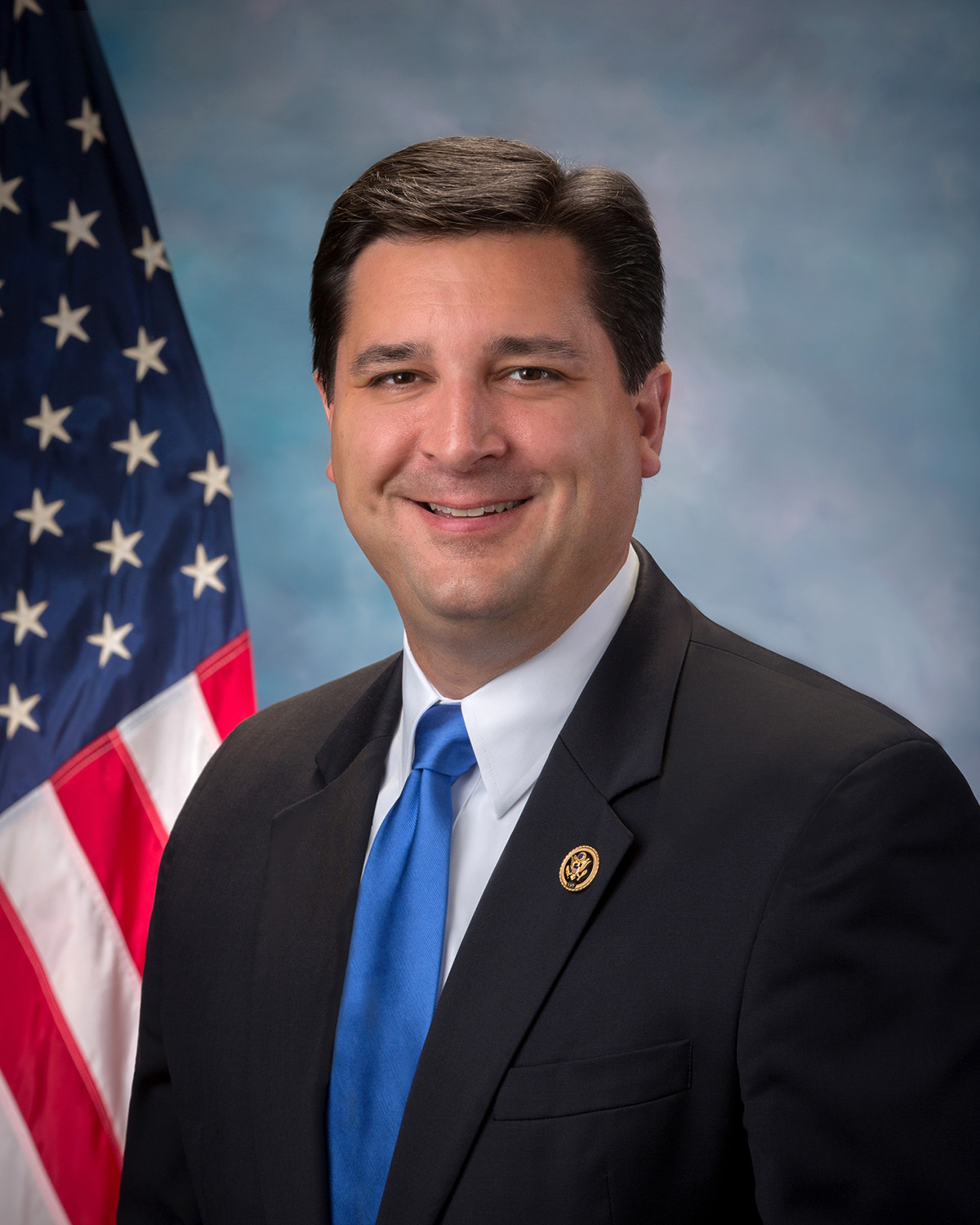
- Official portrait, 2015

Member of the U.S. House of Representatives from North Carolina's 7th district
- Incumbent
- Assumed office January 3, 2015
- Preceded by: Mike McIntyre

Member of the North Carolina Senate from the 12th district
- In office January 1, 2009 – January 1, 2013
- Preceded by: Fred Smith
- Succeeded by: Ronald Rabin

Personal details
- Born: February 16, 1972 (age 54) Landstuhl, West Germany
- Party: Republican
- Education: North Carolina State University (BS)
- Website: House website Campaign website
- Rouzer's voice Rouzer on Biblical values. Recorded November 14, 2017

David Cheston Rouzer (/ˈraʊzər/ ROW-zər; born February 16, 1972) is an American politician who is the U.S. representative for North Carolina's 7th congressional district. Previously he was a Republican member of the North Carolina General Assembly, representing Johnston County and Wayne County in the 12th district of the North Carolina Senate.

== Early life, education, and business career ==
Rouzer was born at Landstuhl Army Medical Center in Landstuhl, West Germany (now Germany), where his father was based, in 1972. He was raised in Durham, North Carolina, where he attended Northern High School.

Rouzer attended North Carolina State University, where he was a member of the Phi Delta Theta fraternity. In 1994, he earned a Bachelor of Arts degree in agricultural business management, agricultural economics, and chemistry. Rouzer is also a graduate of the Fund for American Studies' Institutes on Business and Government Affairs and American Economic and Political Systems.

Rouzer has been a small business owner of The Rouzer Company and the Warehouse Distribution. From 2001 to 2002, he was assistant to the dean at the North Carolina State University College of Agriculture and Life Sciences. From 2005 to 2006, he was an associate-rural administrator for the U.S. Department of Agriculture.

== Early political career ==
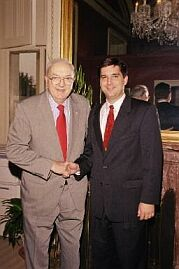
Rouzer with Jesse Helms in 2000

From 1996 to 2001, Rouzer was a legislative aide and Senior Policy Adviser for U.S. Senators Jesse Helms and Elizabeth Dole. In 2000, he ran for North Carolina Commissioner of Agriculture and lost the Republican primary.

== North Carolina Senate ==
=== Elections ===
In 2008, incumbent Republican state senator Fred Smith decided to retire in order to run for governor of North Carolina. Rouzer ran for Smith's old seat and defeated Nena Reeves in the Republican primary, 68%–32%. In the general election, he defeated Kay Carroll, 52%–48%. In 2010, he was reelected with 70% of the vote.

=== Issues ===
He worked on strengthening laws allowing youths to obtain driver's licenses. He was also a proponent of the 2012 "sea-level rise" legislation that sought to mandate that only historical data be used to predict future trends.

Rouzer favors repealing the Affordable Care Act. In his 2012 campaign he released a TV ad in which his grandmother promised that he would not cut Medicare if elected. He believes immigrants should be fluent in English before being granted U.S. citizenship. He is anti-abortion.

=== Tenure ===
In his four years, he has sponsored 17 bills that have become signed into law.

=== Committee assignments ===
Standing/Select Committees

- Agriculture/Environment/Natural Resources (Co-chairman)
- Appropriations on Natural and Economic Resources (Co-chairman)
- Finance
- Health Care
- Insurance
- Judiciary I
- Program Evaluation
- Select Committee on University of North Carolina Board of Governors

Non-Standing Committees

- Agriculture and Forestry Awareness Study Commission (Chairman)
- Consolidated Environmental Commission Committee
- Joint Legislative Task Force on Diabetes Prevention and Awareness
- Environmental Review Commission (Chairman)
- Joint Legislative Oversight Committee on Information Technology
- Joint Regulatory Reform Committee (Chairman)
- Revenue Laws Study Committee
- Joint Select Committee on Tornado Damage Response

== U.S. House of Representatives ==
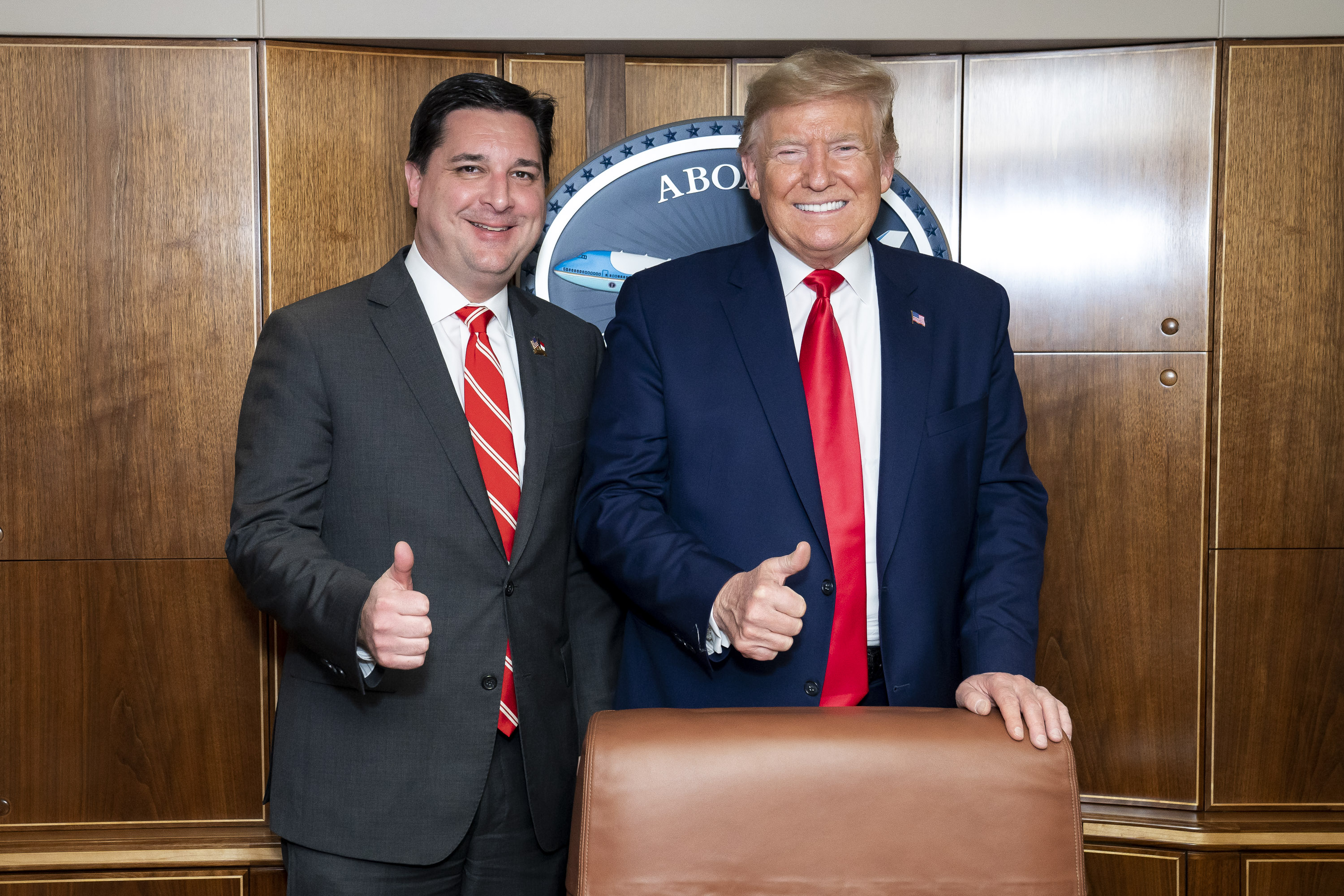
Rouzer with President Donald Trump in 2020

=== Elections ===
==== 2012 ====
After Republican-controlled redistricting, Rouzer gave up his State Senate seat to run in the newly redrawn North Carolina's 7th congressional district and challenge incumbent Democratic U.S. Representative Mike McIntyre. His home in Johnston County had been drawn into the district; it had previously been in the 2nd District. In the Republican primary, Rouzer defeated both 2010 nominee Ilario Pantano and Randy Crow, but won just four of the district's twelve counties: Johnston (82%), Sampson (49%), Lenoir (43%), and Hoke (38%). His margin in Johnston County, the second-largest in the reconfigured district, was enough for him to win.

The redrawn 7th is much more conservative and Republican than its predecessor. Roll Call rates the election as leans Republican.

After an official tabulation showed that Rouzer had lost the election to McIntyre by 655 votes, Rouzer asked for a recount on November 21, 2012. After the recount, Rouzer conceded the race to McIntyre on November 28. It was the closest House race in the country. Mitt Romney carried the district with 56% of the vote.

==== 2014 ====
Rouzer ran for the 7th district again in 2014. McIntyre retired rather than face a rematch. Most pundits believed that with McIntyre's retirement, the seat would be an easy GOP pickup. Even before his near miss in 2012, the 7th had been trending Republican for some time.

Rouzer won the general election with almost 60% of the vote. Upon taking office in January 2015, he became only the second Republican to represent a significant portion of eastern North Carolina in the House since Reconstruction.

==== 2016 ====
After court-ordered redistricting, Rouzer's district was made slightly more compact. It lost most of its share of Johnston County and was pushed slightly to the east, picking up all of Wilmington–long the district's largest city–as well as Goldsboro. Rouzer was unopposed for the Republican nomination and defeated Democrat J. Wesley Casteen in the general election with 60.9% of the vote.

==== 2018 ====
Rouzer won a third term to Congress with 55.5% of the vote over Democratic nominee Kyle Horton and Constitution Party nominee David Fallin, his narrowest margin of victory so far. Before the election, he sold his home in Benson and bought one in Wilmington, saying it was "a reflection of where I spend the vast majority of my time."

==== 2020 ====
Rouzer won the Republican nomination unopposed, as his only opponent was disqualified from the ballot. Rouzer defeated Democratic nominee Christopher Ward in the general election with 60.2% of the vote.

==== 2022 ====
After the court-drawn map was put in place, Rouzer’s district contained Robeson County and parts of Cumberland County, while removing parts of Johnston, Sampson, and Harnett counties. In the Republican primary, Rouzer defeated Marine veteran and businessman Max Southworth-Beckwith with 79.2% of the vote. In the general election, Rouzer defeated Democratic nominee Charles Graham with 57.7% of the vote.

==== 2024 ====
After the Republican-controlled General Assembly passed a new congressional map following a ruling from the North Carolina Supreme Court, Rouzer’s district contained less of Robeson County, along with a new portion of Sampson County. Rouzer won the Republican nomination unopposed. Rouzer defeated Democratic nominee Marlando Pridgen with 58.6% of the vote in the general election.

=== Tenure ===
Rouzer was sworn into office on January 3, 2015, for the 114th Congress. As of May 2019, he had sponsored 24 pieces of legislation during his tenure, of which 2 became public law. He also coauthored (with U.S. Senator Thom Tillis) a provision to the John D. Dingell Jr. Conservation, Management, and Recreation Act that gave authority to the United States Secretary of the Interior to designate a World War II Heritage city each year. The provision went into effect when the legislation was signed into law by President Donald Trump in 2019. Wilmington was expected to be among the first designated Heritage Cities.

In December 2020, Rouzer was one of 126 Republican members of the House of Representatives to sign an amicus brief in support of Texas v. Pennsylvania, a lawsuit filed at the United States Supreme Court contesting the results of the 2020 presidential election, in which Joe Biden defeated Trump. The Supreme Court declined to hear the case on the basis that Texas lacked standing under Article III of the Constitution to challenge the results of an election held by another state.

=== Committee assignments ===
For the 119th Congress:

- Committee on Agriculture
  - Subcommittee on Commodity Markets, Digital Assets, and Rural Development
  - Subcommittee on Forestry and Horticulture
  - Subcommittee on General Farm Commodities, Risk Management, and Credit (Vice Chair)
- Committee on Science, Space, and Technology
  - Subcommittee on Environment
  - Subcommittee on Research and Technology
- Subcommittee on Transportation and Infrastructure
  - Subcommittee on Highways and Transit (Chairman)
  - Subcommittee on Railroads, Pipelines, and Hazardous Materials

=== Caucus memberships ===
- Republican Study Committee
- Congressional Coalition on Adoption
- Congressional Caucus on Turkey and Turkish Americans
- Congressional Taiwan Caucus
- Congressional Western Caucus
- House BIOTech Caucus
- Modern Agriculture Caucus

== Political positions ==
=== Texas vs. Pennsylvania ===
After the 2020 presidential election, Rouzer was among 126 House Republicans who supported Texas v. Pennsylvania, a December 2020 lawsuit that asked the Supreme Court to overturn Biden's electoral victories in Georgia, Michigan, Pennsylvania and Wisconsin. North Carolina Attorney General Josh Stein joined other State Attorneys General in opposing Texas's suit, saying "This suit seeks to overturn the will of the people by throwing out the votes of tens of millions of Americans." The Supreme Court denied Texas's motion for lack of standing under Article III of the Constitution. On January 6, 2021, Rouzer was one of 147 Republican lawmakers who objected to the certification of electoral votes from the 2020 presidential election just hours after a mob of Trump supporters stormed the U.S. Capitol forcing an emergency recess of Congress.

U.S. House of Representatives
Preceded by Mike McIntyre	Member of the U.S. House of Representatives from North Carolina's 7th congressional district 2015–present	Incumbent
U.S. order of precedence (ceremonial)
Preceded by Gary Palmer	United States representatives by seniority 143rd	Succeeded by Elise Stefanik
