= David R. Lewis =

American politician

David Lewis
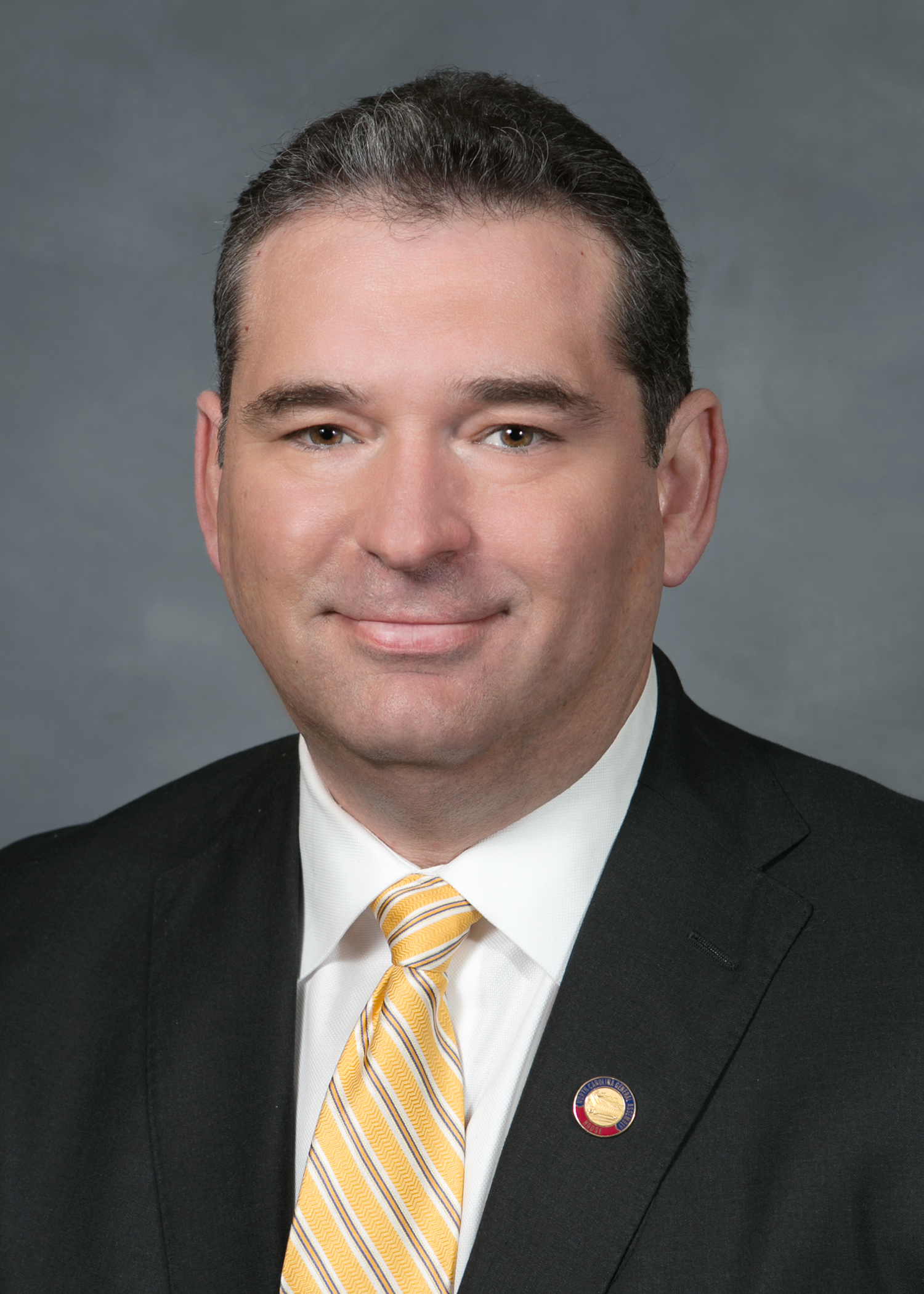

Member of the North Carolina House of Representatives from the 53rd district
- In office January 1, 2003 – August 20, 2020
- Preceded by: Don Davis (Redistricting)
- Succeeded by: Howard Penny Jr.

Personal details
- Born: David Ray Lewis; March 6, 1971 (age 55) Fayetteville, North Carolina, U.S.
- Party: Republican
- Spouse: Michelle Lawrence
- Education: Campbell University (BA)
- Website: Official website

David Ray Lewis (born March 6, 1971) is an American former politician of the Republican Party who served as a member of the North Carolina General Assembly from 2002 to 2020, representing the state's 53rd House District. His district encompassed most of Harnett County including the City of Dunn and Towns of Angier, Coats, Erwin, and Lillington.

Additionally, Lewis formerly served as the National Committeeman for the North Carolina Republican Party.

In August 2020, he pleaded guilty to making a false statement to a bank and failing to file an income tax return. He then resigned.

== Early life, education and career ==
Lewis was born in Fayetteville, North Carolina, the son of Jean (née Hudson) and Donnie Lewis. He grew up in Dunn area and attended Cape Fear High School in Cumberland County, North Carolina.

After graduating from Cape Fear High School, Lewis went on to receive his degree in business administration from Campbell University. While at Campbell University, Lewis served two terms as student body president and was also a member of the College Republicans.

He is a tobacco farmer and co-owner at Quality Equipment, LLC.

== Political career ==
Lewis was the co-chair of the elections committee, responsible for the voter identification legislation as well as his work on the most recent round of redistricting in the State of North Carolina. This redistricting has been challenged as an instance of partisan gerrymandering. In his role as NC House redistricting leader, Lewis said that he wanted the maps drawn “to give a partisan advantage to 10 Republicans and three Democrats because [he did] not believe it’s possible to draw a map with 11 Republicans and two Democrats.” In addition, he stated: “I think electing Republicans is better than electing Democrats. So I drew this map to help foster what I think is better for the country.”

During a fraud investigation into the 2018 U.S. House race in North Carolina's 9th district where a Republican operative conducted large-scale electoral fraud, Lewis introduced a bill that would put Republicans in charge of every election board in every election year. On July 24, 2020, Lewis announced that he would be retiring at the end of his term and would not seek re-election.

Lewis resigned on August 20, 2020, when he was charged with making false statements to a bank and failure to file a tax return.

== Political campaigns ==
2002

Lewis defeated primary challenger, Teddy Byrd, in the September 10th, 2002 Republican Primary garnering 54% of the vote. On November 5, 2002, Lewis won election to the North Carolina House of Representatives by defeating Larry C. Upchurch (D).

2004

On November 2, 2004, Lewis won re-election to the North Carolina House of Representatives by defeating Louise Taylor (D). Lewis did not face a Republican challenger in the primary election.

2006

On November 7, 2006, Lewis won re-election to the North Carolina House of Representatives by defeating Frank Stewart (D). For the second election in a row, Lewis did not face a Republican challenger in the primary election.

2008

On November 4, 2008, Lewis won re-election to the North Carolina House of Representatives by defeating Joseph Lindsey Tart (D). For the third election cycle in a row, Lewis did not face a Republican challenger in the primary election.

2010

On November 2, 2010, Lewis won re-election to the North Carolina House of Representatives by defeating Abraham Oudeh (D). For the fourth consecutive election cycle, Lewis did not face a Republican challenger in the primary election.

2012

Lewis ran for re-election in 2012. He ran unopposed in the May 8, 2012 Republican primary for the fifth consecutive election cycle and defeated Joseph Langley (D) in the general election which took place on November 6, 2012.

2014

Lewis ran for re-election in 2014. He ran unopposed in the May 6, 2014 Republican primary for the sixth consecutive election cycle and defeated Susan Byerly (D) in the general election which took place on November 4, 2014.

2016

Lewis beat primary challenger, William "Chuck" Levorse, in the March primary garnering 79% of the vote. On November 8, 2016, Lewis won election to the North Carolina House of Representatives by defeating Jon Blum (D) with 61% of the vote.

2018

Lewis ran for re-election again in 2018. On November 6, 2018 he defeated Democratic nominee Richard Chapman with just under 63% of the vote.

== Electoral history ==
North Carolina State House of Representatives District 53 Results 2002–2018
Year	Democrat	Votes	%	Republican	Votes	%
2002	Larry C. Upchurch	5,987	38%	David Lewis	9,672	62%
2004	Louise Taylor	10,217	41%	David Lewis	14,633	59%
2006	Frank Stewart	6,846	47%	David Lewis	7,763	53%
2008	Joseph Tart	14,431	47%	David Lewis	16,135	53%
2010	Abraham Oudeh	6,784	33%	David Lewis	13,533	67%
2012	Joseph Langley	13,370	44%	David Lewis	17,365	56%
2014	Susan Byerly	8,707	44%	David Lewis	10,966	56%
2016	Jon Blum	12,678	39%	David Lewis	19,548	61%
2018	Richard Chapman	10,108	37%	David Lewis	17,201	63%

== Personal life and criminal convictions ==
Lewis resides in Dunn, North Carolina. On August 26, 2020, Lewis pleaded guilty to making a false statement to a bank and failing to file his federal income tax return. Federal investigators produced evidence that Lewis had stolen funds from his campaign account in order to prop up his failing farm. Specifically, Lewis opened a new bank account with the name "NC GOP Inc" and then wrote checks totaling $65,000 to that new account from his campaign account. This was evidently an attempt to make it appear as if the money was being transferred to the North Carolina Republican Party. Although he faced sentencing guidelines of up to 30 years in prison, prosecutors allowed Lewis to take a plea deal. He was let off with no prison time.

On August 17, 2021 he was sentenced for misappropriating campaign funds and failing to file his 2018 federal income tax return. Lewis was sentenced to 24 months supervised release in which one year was for the false return count, and is to serve one day active sentence for each count served concurrent.

North Carolina House of Representatives
Preceded by Roger West	Member of the North Carolina House of Representatives from the 53rd district 2003–2020	Succeeded by Howard Penny Jr.
