= Howard Penny Jr. =

American politician

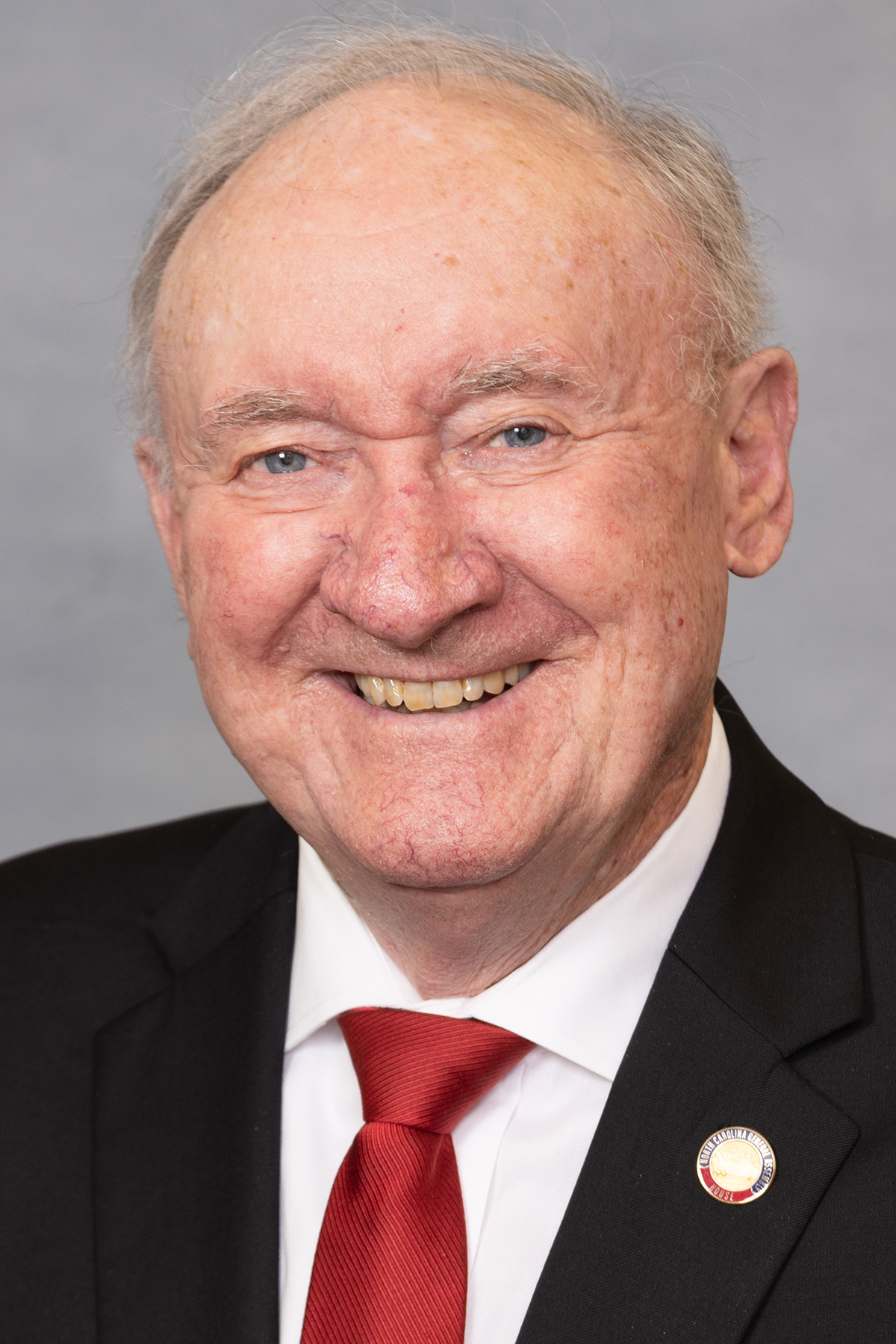

Member of the North Carolina House of Representatives from the 53rd district
- Incumbent
- Assumed office September 17, 2020
- Preceded by: David Lewis

Member of the Harnett County Board of Commissioners from the 3rd District
- In office 2016–2020
- Preceded by: Jim Burgin
- Succeeded by: W. Brooks Matthews

Member of the Harnett County Board of Education from the 3rd District
- In office 2014–2016
- Preceded by: Chuck Levorse
- Succeeded by: Jason Lemons

Personal details
- Born: Howard Lassiter Penny Jr. August 5, 1947 (age 78) Harnett County, North Carolina, U.S.
- Party: Republican
- Profession: businessman

Howard Lassiter Penny Jr. (born August 5, 1947) is an American politician who is a Republican member of the North Carolina House of Representatives. He represents the 53rd district, which includes Harnett County, North Carolina and he took the oath of office on September 17, 2020. He is a retired businessman in the agriculture industry and served on the Harnett County Commission.

== Electoral history ==
=== 2020 ===
Harnett County Board of Commissioners 3rd district Republican primary election, 2020
Party	Candidate	Votes	%
Republican	W. Brooks Matthews	1,217	50.29%
Republican	Howard Penny Jr. (incumbent)	1,203	49.71%
Total votes		2,420	100%

North Carolina House of Representatives 53rd district general election, 2020
Party	Candidate	Votes	%
Republican	Howard Penny Jr. (incumbent)	26,228	60.97%
Democratic	Sally Weeks Benson	15,129	35.17%
Libertarian	Zach Berly	1,658	3.85%
Total votes		43,015	100%
Republican hold			

=== 2016 ===
Harnett County Board of Commissioners 3rd district Republican primary election, 2016
Party	Candidate	Votes	%
Republican	Howard Penny Jr.	1,560	59.93%
Republican	Michael R. Jackson	1,043	40.07%
Total votes		2,603	100%

Harnett County Board of Commissioners 3rd district general election, 2016
Party	Candidate	Votes	%
Republican	Howard Penny Jr.	6,627	74.17%
Democratic	Monica DeAngelis	2,308	25.83%
Total votes		8,935	100%
Republican hold			

=== 2014 ===
Harnett County Board of Education 3rd district Republican primary election, 2014
Party	Candidate	Votes	%
Republican	Howard Penny Jr.	463	52.61%
Republican	Chuck Levorse (incumbent)	417	47.39%
Total votes		880	100%

Harnett County Board of Education 3rd district general election, 2014
Party	Candidate	Votes	%
Republican	Howard Penny Jr.	2,941	57.51%
Democratic	Doug Turner	2,173	42.49%
Total votes		3,154	100%
Republican hold			

=== 2012 ===
Harnett County Board of Commissioners 3rd district Republican primary election, 2012
Party	Candidate	Votes	%
Republican	Jim Burgin (incumbent)	1,278	54.04%
Republican	Howard Penny Jr.	1,087	45.96%
Total votes		2,365	100%

== Committee assignments ==
=== 2021-2022 session ===
- Appropriations
- Appropriations - General Government
- Agriculture
- State Personnel (Vice Chair)
- Wildlife Resources

North Carolina House of Representatives
Preceded by David Lewis	Member of the North Carolina House of Representatives from the 53rd district 2020-Present	Incumbent
