= Raquel Rabinovich =

Argentine-American artist (1929–2025)

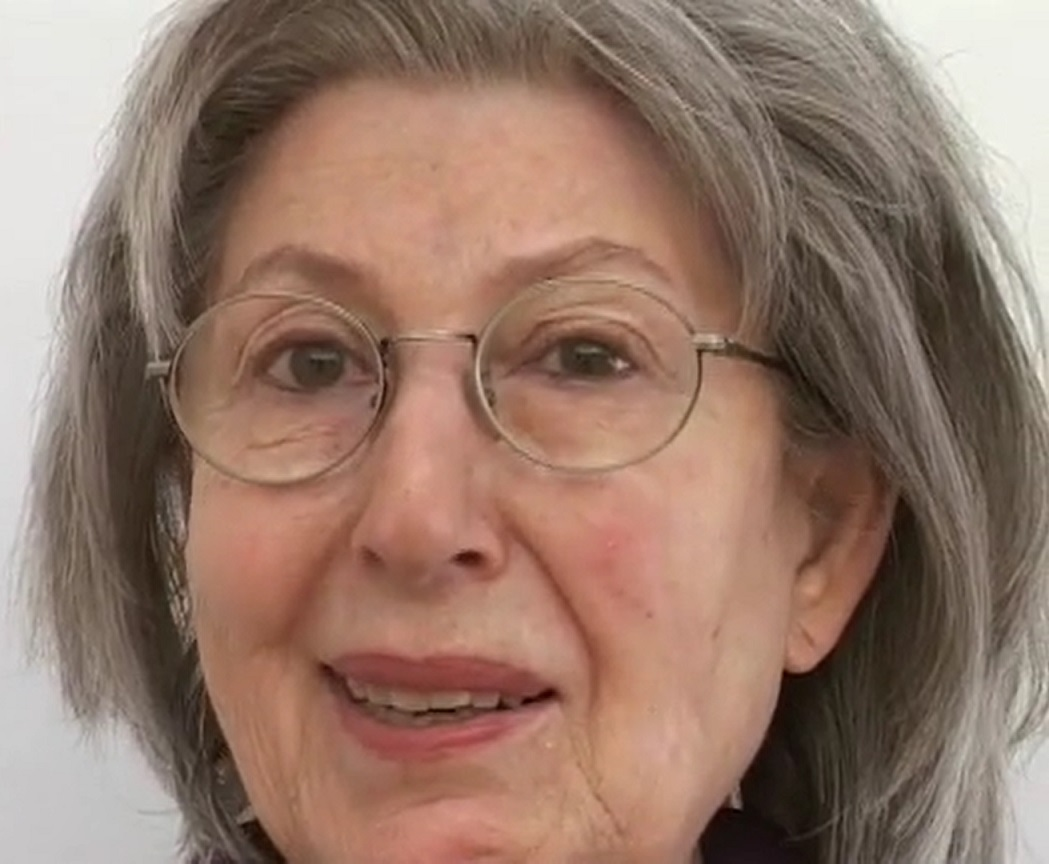
- Born: March 30, 1929; Buenos Aires, Argentina
- Died: January 5, 2025 (aged 95); Rhinebeck, New York, U.S.
- Citizenship: Argentina; United States (from 1973)
- Education: University of Córdoba; Sorbonne
- Known for: Monochromatic painting, drawing, glass sculpture, site-specific installations
- Notable work: The Dark is Light Enough (1963); Emergences; River Library
- Spouse: Jose Luis Reissig (m. 1956; div. 1980)
- Children: 3
- Awards: Lee Krasner Award for Lifetime Achievement, Pollock-Krasner Foundation (2011–12)

Raquel Rabinovich (March 30, 1929 – January 5, 2025) was an Argentine-American artist. She is known for her monochromatic paintings and drawings as well as for her large-scale glass sculpture environments and site-specific installations along the shores of the Hudson River. She is included in the Oral History Program of the Smithsonian Institution Archives of American Art. Her work is included in numerous museum collections, including the Whitney Museum of American Art, the Metropolitan Museum of Art and the Smithsonian American Art Museum.

== Life and work ==
Rabinovich was born in Buenos Aires, Argentina, on March 30, 1929, to Russian and Romanian Jewish parents. She grew up in Córdoba. From 1950 to 1952 she studied at the University of Córdoba. Some of her earliest influences were Argentine artists Héctor Basaldúa, Vicente Forte and Ernesto Farina, whose studios Rabinovich would visit. She would go on to study art under Farina in Cordoba. In the late 1950s she spent six years in Europe, studying art history at the Sorbonne and studio art with Andre Lhote.

In 1956 Rabinovich married fellow Argentine Jose Luis Reissig and had three children together; they divorced in 1980. After many years apart, they resumed their partnership in 1987. She returned to Argentina in the early 1960s, where she initiated a period of contemplation and reflection that led to a series of paintings titled The Dark is Light Enough. These works were exhibited in Buenos Aires in 1963. The series marked the beginning of her lifelong investigation into the nature of existence through the exploration of what she called the "dark source". The dark source, for Rabinovich embodies the concealed aspects of existence that seem to be invisible, which are behind the appearance of things, thoughts, language, and the world. Due to a military coup in Argentina in 1966, she moved to the United States in 1967 with her family and became an American citizen in 1973.

In the early 70s Rabinovich had a dream in which her paintings became transparent and free-standing, so she began creating sculptures using glass. These were first exhibited in 1973. In 1979 she visited Machu Picchu. She stayed in the ruins overnight and before dawn Machu Picchu disappeared from view, then very slowly appeared, as the clouds lifted in the morning. Many years later, influenced by this experience she would create stone sculptural installations Emergences along the shores of the Hudson River. Like Machu Picchu, these stone sculptures also disappear from view and gradually emerge into view, only this time the stones are concealed by the tides.

In 1987, her fascination with ancient cultures took her to Egypt, India, Nepal, Indonesia, and Thailand. These travels had a profound impact on her work.

Rabinovich died at her home in Rhinebeck, New York, on January 5, 2025, after being recently diagnosed with cancer. She was 95.

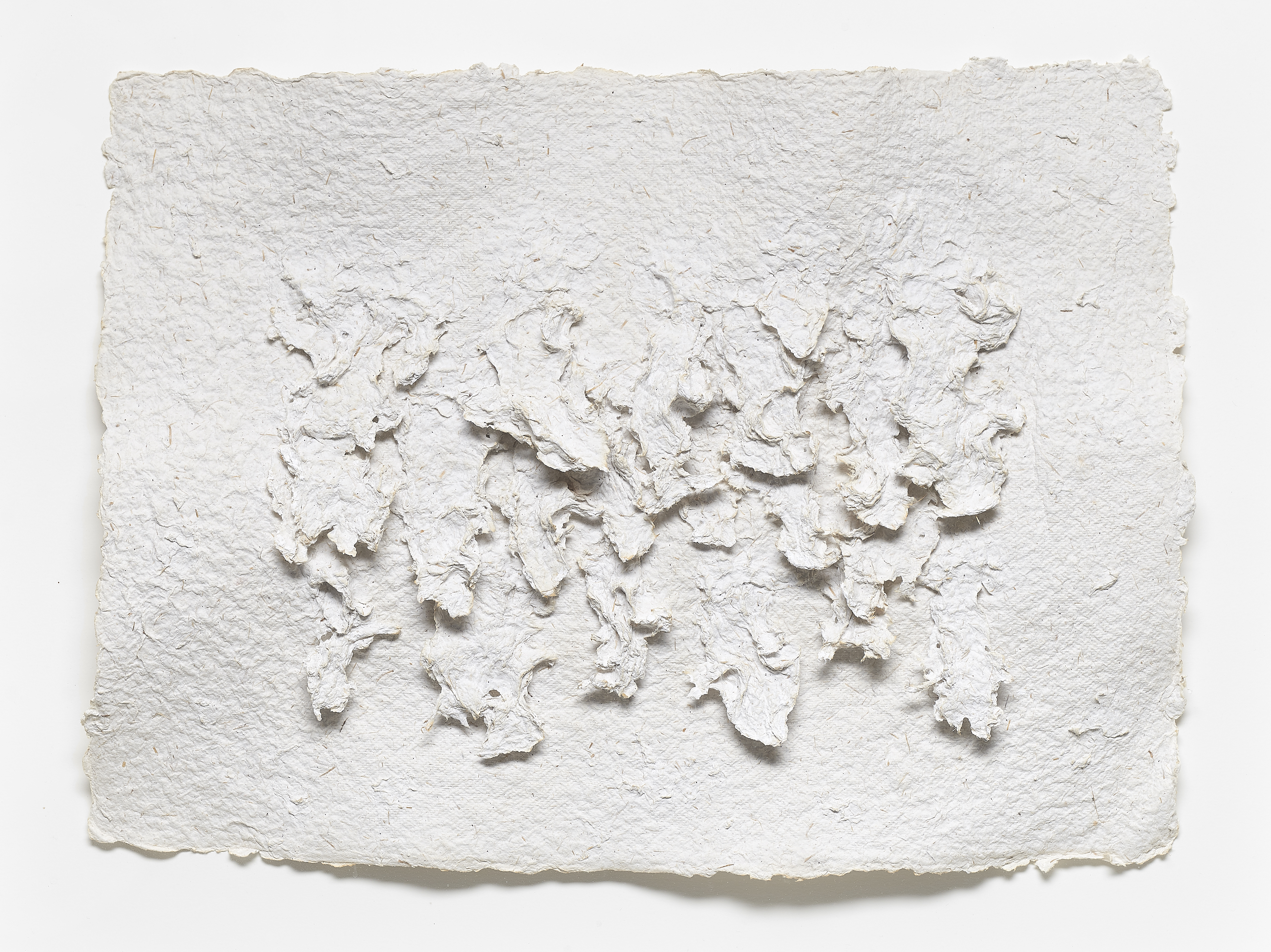
Raquel Rabinovich, "Untitled Relief into Handmade Paper 13," 1988.

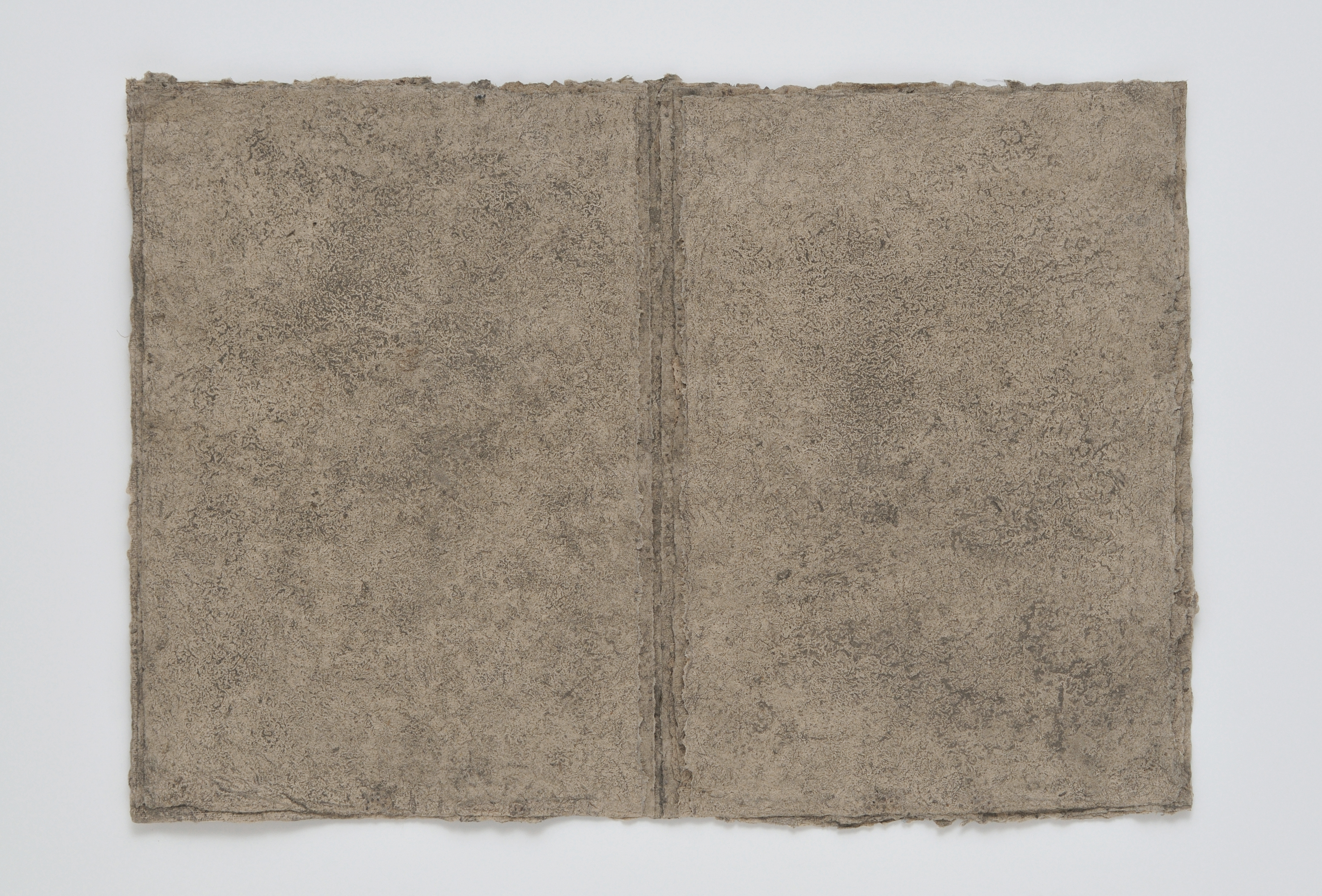
Raquel Rabinovich, "River Library 395 with Footnotes," 2012–14.

== Selected exhibitions ==
Rabinovich's work has been presented in several exhibitions including:

- Raquel Rabinovich: The Reading Room (Thompson Memorial Library, Vassar College, Poughkeepsie, NY 2018).
- Thresholds, (Y Gallery, New York City, 2017).
- River Library (Fundacion Alon, Buenos Aires, Argentina, 2008).
- River Library ("Imaging the River", Group exhibition, Hudson River Museum, Yonkers, NY 2003–04).
- Raquel Rabinovich (Galeria Jaime Conci, Cordoba, Argentina, 1990).
- Beyond the Surface: Raquel Rabinovich, Recent Work (American Society, New York, curated by Fatima Bercht).
- Cloister, Crossing, Passageway, 1.32 (CUNY Graduate Center Mall, NYC 1978 and The Jewish Museum Sculpture Court, NYC, 1979).

== Publications ==
- 2016: Messina, Gaby. Maestros. El bosque y el árbol/Maestros. The Forest and the Trees. Buenos Aires, Argentina. pp. 76–77.
- 2013: Perazzo, Nelly. Historia general del arte en la Argentina, Tomo XI (Escultura Argentina 1965–2000). Academia Nacional de Bellas Artes, Buenos Aires, Argentina. pp. 263–2642010 Levi Strauss, David. In Praise of Darkness, From Head to Hand: Art and the Manual. New York: Oxford University Press: pp. 66–69.
- 2008: Herzberg, Julia P. Raquel Rabinovich, Antología del lecho de los ríos/Anthology of the Riverbeds, Buenos Aires: Editorial Fundación Alon para las Artes (Principal essayist and editor: Julia P. Herzberg; other essayists: Jenny Fox, Patricia C. Phillips and Ana María Battistozzi).
- 2007: Philbin, Ann. 560 Broadway: A New York Drawing Collection at Work, 1991–2006, New Haven and London: Fifth Floor Foundation, New York and Yale University Press: p. 137.
- 2004: Brenner, Hedwig. Judische Frauen in der bildenden Kunst II, edited by Erhard Roy Wiehn, Hartung-Gorre Verlag. Germany: Konstanz: pp. 275–276.
- 2002: Aldana, Erin. St. James Guide to Hispanic Artists. New York: St. James Press: pp. 485–488.
- 1991: Bellamy, Peter. The Artist Project: Portraits of the Real World / New York Artists 1981-1990, IN Publishing, New York, p. 184.
- 1982: Rubiano Caballero, Germán. La Escultura en América Latina (Siglo XX), Ediciones de la Universidad Nacional de Colombia, Bogotá, Colombia.
- 1974: Bayón, Damián C. Aventura Plástica de Hispanoamérica, Breviarios del Fondode Cultura Económica, No. 233, México, p. 161.

== Awards ==
- 2011–12: Lee Krasner Award for Lifetime Achievement, The Pollock-Krasner Foundation, New York, NY
- 1995: New York State Council on the Arts, Individual Artist Grant for Works on Paper, New York, NY
- 1992: National Endowment for the Arts U.S./France Fellowship, Washington, D.C.
- 1991: National Endowment for the Arts Visual Arts Fellowship, Washington, D.C.
- 1980–86: Artists Space Grant, New York, NY
- 1978: CAPS Fellowship Grant, Creative Artists Public Service Program, New York, NY
- 1964: Beca del Fondo Nacional de Las Artes, Buenos Aires, Argentina.

== Collections ==
She is included in the Oral History Program of the Smithsonian Institution Archives of American Art. Her work is included in the collections of the Whitney Museum of American Art, the Metropolitan Museum of Art, the Museo Genaro Perez, Cordoba, Argentina and the Smithsonian American Art Museum.

In South America, her work is in the collections of the Fondo Nacional de las Artes, Buenos Aires, Argentina, the Museo de Arte Moderno, Bogota, Colombia, the Museo de Arte Moderno, Buenos Aires, Argentina, and the Museo Emilio Caraffa, Cordoba, Argentina.

In Europe, her work is in the collection of the Amateras Art Foundation, National Gallery of Art, Sofia, Bulgaria.
