= Haim Maor =

Israeli painter and academic (born 1951)

Haim Maor חיים מאור
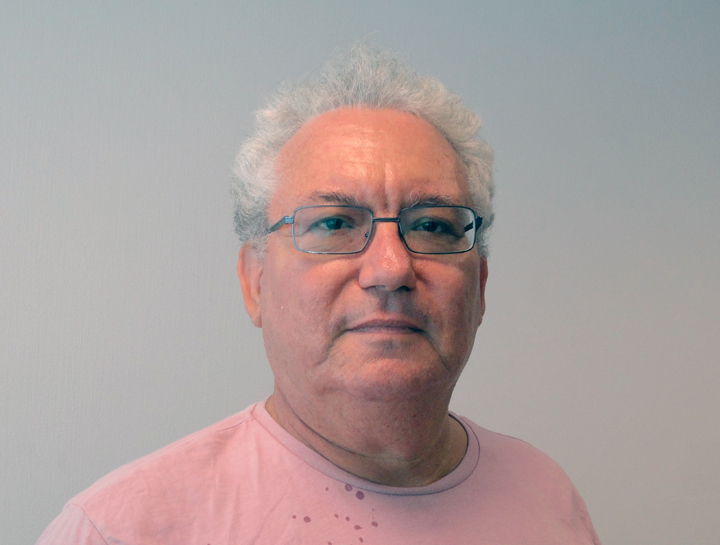
- Born: 1951 (age 74–75); Jaffa, Israel
- Known for: Painting

Haim Maor (Hebrew: חיים מאור; born 1951) is an Israeli painter and academic.

== Early life ==
Haim Maor was born in Jaffa, Israel in 1951. His parents are Holocaust survivors of Polish Jewish descent.

== Career ==
Maor is a painter. His artwork focuses on representations of the Holocaust. His work has been exhibited at the Auschwitz Jewish Center. He was the recipient of The Minister of Science and Art Prize in 1994, the Sussman Prize from Yad Vashem in 1995, and The Ministry of Culture and Sport Prize in 2010.

Maor is also an Arts professor at the Ben-Gurion University of the Negev in Beersheba, Israel.
