= Ernesto Farina =

Argentinian artist

Ernesto Farina (1912–1988) was an Argentinian painter. Farina was born August 6, 1912, in Luque, Córdoba.

His work was included in the 1958 Bienal de San Pablo. Farina was a professor of art in the Universidad Nacional de Córdoba. His work is included in the collection of the Royal Museums of Fine Arts of Belgium.

Farina died March 13, 1988, in Córdoba.
