= Deborah Rabinowitz =

Ecologist

Deborah Rabinowitz (September 9, 1947 — August 18, 1987) was an ecologist who coined the seven meanings of rarity in the field of plant ecology,. She was a professor in the Section of Ecology and Systematics at Cornell University.

== Early life and education ==
Rabinowitz was born and raised in Willimantic, Connecticut, to Louis and Margaret Rabinowitz. She attended public schools and later received her undergraduate degree in biology from New College of Florida in Sarasota. In 1975, she received her Ph.D. in theoretical population biology from the University of Chicago.

Her dissertation at the University of Chicago focused on mangroves. Her interest in mangrove ecology and zonation began during her time as an undergraduate at New College. Previous literature and speculation on why mangrove swamps are zoned had mostly looked at the different tolerances for physical conditions along tidal gradients among species. Rabinowitz grew each Panama mangrove species and found that all the species survived in all the zones. She then moved on to determining if the real problem lay with dispersal. The tides would disperse seeds by their differences in size and weight. Bigger seeds would move further and deeper in seaward substrate, whereas smaller seeds would be found landward. She found a strong correlation between the size of the seed and zones of several regions. She continued to study mangrove ecology, transforming our understanding to what it is today.

She later became the first female faculty member in the department of Ecology and Evolutionary Biology at the University of Michigan. In 1982, she moved to a tenured faculty position at Cornell University in the Section of Ecology and Systematics within the Division of Biological Sciences. Rabinowitz was diagnosed with cancer and died in August 1987 at the age of 39. She was survived by her husband, Peter Ewel, mother, Margaret Rabinowitz, and sister, Margaret Russo.

== Career ==
One prominent aspect of her research focused on rarity and on rare plants. In 1981, she published a paper that described seven different meanings for the concept of “rarity” using North American flora. As part of this research, she developed a framework for characterizing species as rare based on geographic range, habitat specificity, and local population size. Her typology of rare plant species went on to serve as a basis for future research into the nature of rarity in plant species and what factors are involved in their categorization. Her most notable discovery was that ‘frequent type rarity’ is the class of sparse species with largest geographical range.

Deborah took interest in international politics and was active in political demonstrations.

Rabinowitz served as a committee member on the National Science Foundation, the National Academy of Sciences and the Ecological Society of America. She was a frequent reviewer for a number of scholarly articles.

== Bibliography ==
- Rabinowitz, Deborah (1978). "Dispersal properties of mangrove propagules". Biotropica. 10 (1): 47–57. Bibcode:1978Biotr..10...47R. doi:10.2307/2388105. JSTOR 2388105.
- Rabinowitz, Deborah (1978). "Early growth of mangrove seedlings in Panama, and an hypothesis concerning the relationship of dispersal and zonation". Journal of Biogeography. 5 (2): 113–133. Bibcode:1978JBiog...5..113R. doi:10.2307/3038167. JSTOR 3038167.
- Rabinowitz, Deborah (1981). "Seven forms of rarity". In Synge, Hugh (ed.). The Biological Aspects of Rare Plant Conservation. London: John Wiley & Sons. pp. 205–217. ISBN 978-0471277972.
- Kurckeberg, Arthur R.; Rabinowitz, Deborah (1985). "Biological aspects of endemism in higher plants". Annual Review of Ecology and Systematics. 16: 447–479. doi:10.1146/annurev.ecolsys.16.1.447.
- Rabinowitz, Deborah; Cairns, Sara; Dillon, Theresa (1986). "Seven forms of rarity and their frequency in the flora of the British Isles". In Soulé, Michael E. (ed.). Conservation Biology: The Science of Scarcity and Diversity. Sunderland, Massachusetts: Sinauer Associates. pp. 182–204. ISBN 978-0-87893-795-0.
