= Samuel Jacob Rabinowitz =

Lithuanian rabbi, writer, and Zionist leader

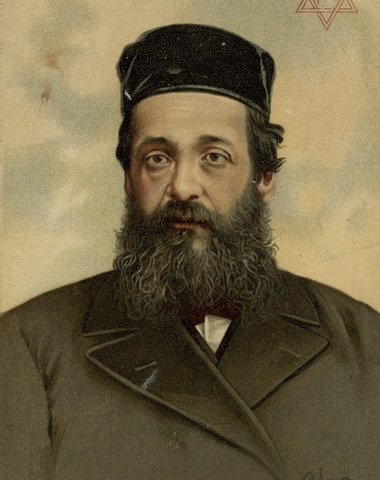
- Title: Chief Rabbi of Liverpool

Personal life
- Born: 1857 Kelme, Kovno Governorate, Russian Empire
- Died: 1921 (aged 63–64)

Religious life
- Religion: Judaism

Samuel Jacob Rabinowitz (Yiddish: שמואל יעקב בן שמעון מאיר ראבינאוויץ; 1857–1921) was a Lithuanian rabbi, writer, and Zionist leader. He has been described as the "greatest spokesman of religious Zionism before Reines."

Rabinowitz was born in Kelme, Kovno Governorate, in 1857. He became rabbi at Ivye in 1887, and was called in the same year to Aleksot. He was an early member of Ḥovevei Zion, and was a delegate to the Second Zionist Congress at Basel. He became rabbi of Sopotkin in 1900, and of Liverpool in 1906.

== Work ==
Rabinowitz contributed a number of articles to Ha-Melitz, which later were published under the title Ha-Dat veha-Le'ummiyyut (Warsaw, 1900). A collection of his responsa and novellae were published as Sefer Oraḥ Yashar in Vilna in 1903.

=== Selected publications ===
- Ha-Dat veha-Le'ummiyyut [Religion and Nationalism]. Warsaw. 1900.
- Sefer Oraḥ Yashar. Vilna. 1903.
- Li-Tekufot ha-Yamim [The Cycle of Seasons]. 1918.
- Sefer Yashresh Ya'akov. Liverpool: Rabbi S. J. Rabinowitz Memorial Publication Fund. 1925.
