= North Carolina's 12th Senate district =

American legislative district

North Carolina's 12th State Senate district
Senator
Jim Burgin; R–Angier
- Demographics: 59% White; 19% Black; 17% Hispanic; 1% Asian; 4% Multiracial
- Population (2023): 204,543

North Carolina's 12th Senate district is one of 50 districts in the North Carolina Senate. It has been represented by Republican Jim Burgin since 2019.

== Geography ==
Since 2023, the district has included all of Lee and Harnett counties, as well as part of Sampson County. The district overlaps with the 6th, 22nd, 51st, and 53rd state house districts.

== District officeholders since 1973 ==
=== Single-member district ===
Senator	Party	Dates	Notes	Counties
Luther Britt Jr. (Lumberton)	Democratic	January 1, 1973 – January 1, 1979	Redistricted from the 20th district.	1973–1983; All of Hoke and Robeson Counties.
Sam Noble (Lumberton)	Democratic	January 1, 1979 – January 1, 1983		1973–1983; All of Hoke and Robeson Counties.

=== Multi-member district ===
Senator	Party	Dates	Notes	Senator	Party	Dates	Notes	Counties
Tony Rand (Fayetteville)	Democratic	January 1, 1983 – January 1, 1989	Retired to run for Lieutenant Governor.	Lura Self Tally (Fayetteville)	Democratic	January 1, 1983 – January 1, 1993	Redistricted to the 24th district.	1983–1993; Most of Cumberland County.
Joseph Raynor Jr. (Fayetteville)	Democratic	January 1, 1989 – January 1, 1993		Lura Self Tally (Fayetteville)	Democratic	January 1, 1983 – January 1, 1993	Redistricted to the 24th district.	1983–1993; Most of Cumberland County.
A. P. Sands III (Reidsville)	Democratic	January 1, 1993 – January 1, 1995	Redistricted from the 24th district. Retired.	Fred Folger Jr. (Mount Airy)	Democratic	January 1, 1993 – January 1, 1995	Lost re-election.	1993–2003; All of Watauga, Ashe, Alleghany, Surry, Stokes, and Rockingham counties. Part of Guilford County.
Virginia Foxx (Banner Elk)	Republican	January 1, 1995 – January 1, 2003	Redistricted to the 45th district.	Don East (Pilot Mountain)	Republican	January 1, 1995 – January 1, 2001	Retired.	1993–2003; All of Watauga, Ashe, Alleghany, Surry, Stokes, and Rockingham counties. Part of Guilford County.
Virginia Foxx (Banner Elk)	Republican	January 1, 1995 – January 1, 2003	Redistricted to the 45th district.	Phil Berger (Eden)	Republican	January 1, 2001 – January 1, 2003	Redistricted to the 26th district.	1993–2003; All of Watauga, Ashe, Alleghany, Surry, Stokes, and Rockingham counties. Part of Guilford County.

=== Single-member district ===
Senator	Party	Dates	Notes	Counties
Fred Smith (Clayton)	Republican	January 1, 2003 – January 1, 2009	Retired to run for Governor.	2003–2013; All of Johnston County. Part of Wayne County.
David Rouzer (Benson)	Republican	January 1, 2009 – January 1, 2013	Redistricted to the 10th district and retired to run for Congress.	2003–2013; All of Johnston County. Part of Wayne County.
Ronald Rabin (Anderson Creek)	Republican	January 1, 2013 – January 1, 2019	Retired.	2013–2023; All of Lee and Harnett counties. Part of Johnston County.
Jim Burgin (Angier)	Republican	January 1, 2019 – Present		2013–2023; All of Lee and Harnett counties. Part of Johnston County.
Jim Burgin (Angier)	Republican	January 1, 2019 – Present		2023–Present; All of Lee and Harnett counties. Part of Sampson County.

== Election results ==
=== 2024 ===
North Carolina Senate 12th district general election, 2024
Party	Candidate	Votes	%
Republican	Jim Burgin (incumbent)	57,151	61.61%
Democratic	Tanya White Anderson	35,611	38.39%
Total votes		92,762	100%
Republican hold			

=== 2022 ===
North Carolina Senate 12th district Republican primary election, 2022
Party	Candidate	Votes	%
Republican	Jim Burgin (incumbent)	6,511	52.85%
Republican	David Buboltz	4,495	36.49%
Republican	Ernie Watson	1,314	10.67%
Total votes		12,320	100%

North Carolina Senate 12th district general election, 2022
Party	Candidate	Votes	%
Republican	Jim Burgin (incumbent)	36,304	63.45%
Democratic	Richard Chapman	20,914	36.55%
Total votes		57,218	100%
Republican hold			

=== 2020 ===
North Carolina Senate 12th district general election, 2020
Party	Candidate	Votes	%
Republican	Jim Burgin (incumbent)	57,295	60.84%
Democratic	John Kirkman	36,875	39.16%
Total votes		94,170	100%
Republican hold			

=== 2018 ===
North Carolina Senate 12th district general election, 2018
Party	Candidate	Votes	%
Republican	Jim Burgin	34,931	60.00%
Democratic	Jean Sivoli	23,290	40.00%
Total votes		58,221	100%
Republican hold			

=== 2016 ===
North Carolina Senate 12th district Democratic primary election, 2016
Party	Candidate	Votes	%
Democratic	Susan Byerly	11,171	77.39%
Democratic	James "Jay" Willis Sills Jr.	3,263	22.61%
Total votes		14,434	100%

North Carolina Senate 12th district general election, 2016
Party	Candidate	Votes	%
Republican	Ronald Rabin (incumbent)	45,228	57.50%
Democratic	Susan Byerly	33,426	42.50%
Total votes		78,654	100%
Republican hold			

=== 2014 ===
North Carolina Senate 12th district Democratic primary election, 2014
Party	Candidate	Votes	%
Democratic	Joe Langley	4,369	65.77%
Democratic	James W. Clark	2,274	34.23%
Total votes		6,643	100%

North Carolina Senate 12th district general election, 2014
Party	Candidate	Votes	%
Republican	Ronald Rabin (incumbent)	26,903	55.96%
Democratic	Joe Langley	21,169	44.04%
Total votes		48,072	100%
Republican hold			

=== 2012 ===
North Carolina Senate 12th district Democratic primary election, 2012
Party	Candidate	Votes	%
Democratic	Brad Salmon	8,354	60.52%
Democratic	James Clark	5,449	39.48%
Total votes		13,803	100%

North Carolina Senate 12th district Republican primary election, 2012
Party	Candidate	Votes	%
Republican	Don Davis	5,709	37.91%
Republican	Ronald Rabin	4,195	27.86%
Republican	Tim McNeill	3,173	21.07%
Republican	Daniel Glover	1,983	13.17%
Total votes		15,060	100%

North Carolina Senate 12th district Republican primary run-off election, 2012
Party	Candidate	Votes	%
Republican	Ronald Rabin	2,038	52.30%
Republican	Don Davis	1,859	47.70%
Total votes		3,897	100%

North Carolina Senate 12th district general election, 2012
Party	Candidate	Votes	%
Republican	Ronald Rabin	37,809	50.99%
Democratic	Brad Salmon	36,337	49.01%
Total votes		74,146	100%
Republican win (new seat)			

=== 2010 ===
North Carolina Senate 12th district general election, 2010
Party	Candidate	Votes	%
Republican	David Rouzer (incumbent)	40,242	69.66%
Democratic	Jody McLeod	17,525	30.34%
Total votes		57,767	100%
Republican hold			

=== 2008 ===
North Carolina Senate 12th district Democratic primary election, 2008
Party	Candidate	Votes	%
Democratic	Kay Carroll	16,242	68.87%
Democratic	Patricia A. Oliver	7,342	31.13%
Total votes		23,584	100%

North Carolina Senate 12th district Republican primary election, 2008
Party	Candidate	Votes	%
Republican	David Rouzer	8,616	67.79%
Republican	Nena Reeves	4,093	32.21%
Total votes		12,709	100%

North Carolina Senate 12th district general election, 2008
Party	Candidate	Votes	%
Republican	David Rouzer	44,261	51.93%
Democratic	Kay Carroll	40,971	48.07%
Total votes		85,232	100%
Republican hold			

=== 2006 ===
North Carolina Senate 12th district general election, 2006
Party	Candidate	Votes	%
Republican	Fred Smith (incumbent)	23,872	64.86%
Democratic	Sherry M. Altman	12,931	35.14%
Total votes		36,803	100%
Republican hold			

=== 2004 ===
North Carolina Senate 12th district general election, 2004
Party	Candidate	Votes	%
Republican	Fred Smith (incumbent)	48,674	100%
Total votes		48,674	100%
Republican hold			

=== 2002 ===
North Carolina Senate 12th district Republican primary run-off election, 2002
Party	Candidate	Votes	%
Republican	Fred Smith	6,371	80.54%
Republican	E. Ray Boswell	1,539	19.46%
Total votes		7,910	100%

North Carolina Senate 12th district general election, 2002
Party	Candidate	Votes	%
Republican	Fred Smith	26,225	57.67%
Democratic	Allen Wellons (incumbent)	19,253	42.33%
Total votes		45,478	100%
Republican gain from Democratic			

=== 2000 ===
North Carolina Senate 12th district Republican primary election, 2000
Party	Candidate	Votes	%
Republican	Virginia Foxx (incumbent)	8,277	46.08%
Republican	Phil Berger	5,159	28.72%
Republican	Jimmy Walker	4,525	25.19%
Total votes		17,961	100%

North Carolina Senate 12th district general election, 2000
Party	Candidate	Votes	%
Republican	Virginia Foxx (incumbent)	65,128	32.25%
Republican	Phil Berger	58,021	28.73%
Democratic	Al Wheeler	40,934	20.27%
Democratic	Vel Pierce	37,867	18.75%
Total votes		201,950	100%
Republican hold			
Republican hold			
