= Yehiel Rabinowitz =

French painter (b. 1939)

- 'יהיאל רבינוביץ
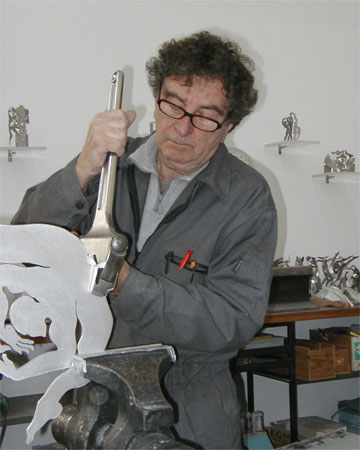
- Yehiel Rabinowitz at work.
- Born: 1939 (age 86–87); Ramat Gan, Israel
- Occupations: Sculptor; painter

Yehiel Rabinowitz (Hebrew: 'יהיאל רבינוביץ; born March 1939) is a Paris-based sculptor and painter. He has created a number of mural paintings and ceramic tile murals in public and private spaces throughout France, Spain, and Belgium. He is also responsible for creating sculptures out of sheets of aluminum and stainless steel in public and private spaces in France and Canada, such as “Les Otimistes” in Fougères, France. Rabinowitz began practicing art as a profession in the 1960s and rose to prominence through the 1970s, 1980s, 1990s, and 2000s.

== Biography ==
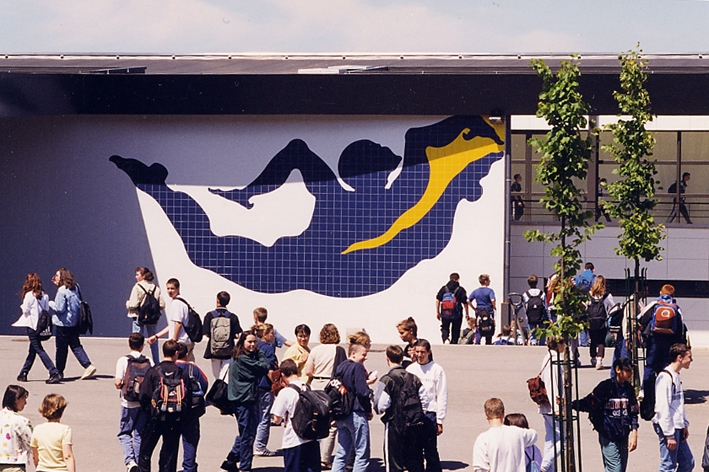
Le Géant Bleu, 1999

Rabinowitz was born in March 1939 in Ramat Gan, near Tel Aviv, a Jewish community in what would later become Israel. He lost his parents at a very early age and spent his childhood years in Poland and Israel. Yehiel was a versatile pupil; able in languages, mathematics, and engineering, yet his principal interest was drawing. He obtained a military rank that allowed him to study at the Academy of Fine Arts in Tel Aviv, where he stayed in 1958 and 1959. He decided to celebrate his twentieth birthday in Paris, the capital of art at the time. Rabinowitz was admitted to the École nationale supérieure des Beaux-Arts in Paris. He stayed there for five years (1960–1965) and refused the customary specialization, enrolling in as many ateliers (drawing, litho, painting, sculpturing) as possible.

Apart from creating numerous individual drawings, paintings, and sculptures, Rabinowitz has won a number of important art contests, thus realizing many large mural paintings and a number of sculptures.

== Early works ==
In 1965, almost immediately after leaving Beaux Arts, Rabinowitz got a first solo exhibition at Gallery Abel Rambert in Paris. This exposition was followed by several others in France, Israel, and Norway. At that time Rabinowitz envisioned making paintings in the street, basically accessible for everybody—quite a revolutionary thought at the time.

In 1968, during the anarchic months in Paris, Rabinowitz became a member of the atelier populaire, making posters to support the student movement. Thereafter Rabinowitz was a founding member of atelier critique, an ever-changing group of artists with a loose, non-hierarchical organization. The group experimented with new ways of collective creating, for example by creating wigs, street-games, balloons, and even floating isles. The atelier ceased to exist in 1970.

== Mural paintings ==
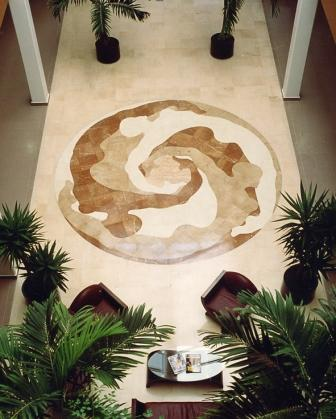
Floor Mosaic, 1992

In 1971 his first mural painting was realized for the photographer Bernard Goustard. It was followed by many others, mainly in Paris, though few of these survive. By 1975, Rabinowitz's mural paintings had raised the attention of a number of architects, one of whom suggested to realize one in the newly built Renault site in Grand-Couronne. This new idea was endorsed by then company president Pierre Dreyfus and subsequently led to a number of mural paintings and murals of ceramic tiles in private and public spaces throughout France, Spain, and Belgium. Rabinowitz realized more than 100 mural paintings until 1999. Some of these are very large covering several thousand square meters. Several mural paintings were supplemented by floors of marble mosaic.

== Sculptures ==
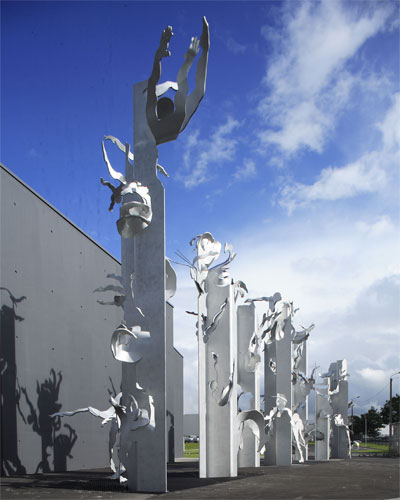
Les Otimistes, Fougères, France, 2007

In the late 1980s, Rabinowitz started experimenting with the creation of sculptures out of sheets of aluminium and stainless steel. During the 1990s he realized a number of important projects in public and private spaces. This part of his artistic accomplishment continues till today, with the highlight to date being "Les Otimistes", a façade sculpture consisting of 15 high columns with 86 "flying persons", realized in Fougères, France (2005–2007).

== Important individual pieces and large projects ==
- Mural painting for Nova Park Hotel, Paris, 1981
- Mural paintings for Renault plant in Sevilla, Spain, 1982–1983
- Mural paintings, mosaics, sculpture garden for Clarins, Pontoise, France, 1984–1992
- Fountain sculpture 'Point d'eau', Paris, 1985
- Mural paintings for Renault plant in Valadollid, Spain 1987
- Sculpture 'Snotor' for D.C.A.N. naval shipyard, Cherbourg, France1989
- 'Les Granes', artistic compositions for apartment-buildings, Paris XIV, 1993–1999
- Drawings, lithos and sculptures 'Pitreries a deux', Paris, 1995
- Large sculptures 'Tête en haut, tête en bas', Paris, 1996
- Large 'folded sculpture', Vancouver, Canada, 1998
- Entry for 'Memorial François Mitterrand', Château Chinon, France 1999
- Blue Giant, Mouy, 1999
- Six sculptures for SODIS, Lagny, France 2000
- Sculpture range 'Les Traversantes', Paris, 2000
- Sculpture 'Nu sur un doigt', Paris, 2003
- Façade Sculpture 'Les Otimistes', Fougères, France 2005-2007

== Recent expositions ==
- Vancouver International Sculpture Project, Vancouver, British Columbia (Canada) 2000
- Otima factory, Fougères, 2002
- Galerie d'avignon, Montreal, 2002
- Galerie Rambert, Paper sculptures, Paris, 2003
- Musée Courbet, Nue d'amour, Summer 2003
- Musée Courbet, Au bord de l'eau, Summer 2004
- Metall Papier Skulpturen, Saarländisches Künstlerhaus, Saarbrücken 2004
- The Sound Barrier, Musée de Chateauroux, 2006
- Avec ton corps, 6 works, Fougeres
- Musée Courbet, Spring 2007
- National Gallery of Foreign Art, Sofia, Bulgaria 2009

== Bibliography ==
- Catalogue of solo exhibition, Galerie Abel Rosenberg, Paris, 1965
- Colour for Architecture, Tom Porter & Byron Mikellides, Studio Vista, London 1976
- Journal de l'année, Editions Larousse, Paris, 1978
- Le livre du Mur Peint Art et techniques, Dominique Durand & Daniel Boulogne, Editions Alternatives, Paris, 1984
- Les raisons de la couleur dans les espaces de vie et de travail, Daniel Boulogne, Editions Alternatives, Paris, 1985
- Actualité du Mur Peint, Daniel Boulogne, Editions Syros-Alternatives, Paris, 1989
- Ovazione, Editions Electa, Torino, 1999
- Les Traversantes, Editions disegnodiverso, Torino, 2000
- Catalogue of Vancouver International Art Project, Edition Buschlen Mowatt Gallery, Vancouver, 2000
- Catalogue of exhibition Des Nus et des Nues… ou les aventures de la Percheronne 1853-2003, Musée Courbet, Ornans, 2003
- Catalogue of exhibition 80/80, Galerie Rambert, Paris, 2003
- Catalogue of exhibition Metall Papiere Skulpturen, Saarländisches Künstlerhaus, Saarbrücken, 2004
- Catalogue of exhibition Jeux d'eau, Musée Courbet, Ornans, 2004
- Catalogue of exhibition, Le Mur du Son, Musée de Chateauroux, 2006
- Catalogue of exhibition, Rencontres, Musée Courbet, Ornans, 2007
- Film: Les hommes volants de Joel, Anatas Kiriakov, 2008
- Catalogue of exhibition, Yehiel Rabinowitz, National Gallery of Foreign Art, Sofia, Bulgaria 2009
