= List of Ashkenazi Jewish surnames =

Name	Community	Early references	Later attested in	Meaning	Notes
Aaron, Aaaronsohn			Mecklenburg, Holland, Romania, United States, England, Ottoman Palestine		
Abel, Abeles, Abelman, Abelson		Moravia (17th century)	Prussia, Lithuania		
Abigdor (Vigdor, Vigder, Vigdortshick or Vigdorowitz)		France (1350)	Eastern Europe, England, Constantinople and Nice, France		
Abraham (Abrahams, Abrahamson, Abrahamsohn, Abrahamsen)	Ashkenazi		Rumelia, Antwerp		
Abramowitz		Russia			
Abrams (Abramsky, Abramson)	Ashkenazi		Germany, Poland		
Abt (Abterode, Abedroth, Aptrod)	Ashkenazi			Derived from Abterode, Hesse	
Bak	Ashkenazi		Italy, Jerusalem (16th century)		
Cohen (also Cowen, Cowan, Cohan, Cohane, Cohne, Cone, Coon, Kan, Koon, Cohn, Conn, Kahn, Kohn, Cahn, Cahen, Cahun, Caen, Cain, Coen, Coffen, Kahin, Cahan, Cahana, Kahan, Kahana, Kahane, Kagan, Kogan, Kogen, Kohan, Kohnowski, Koganowitch, Kohne, Kohner, Cohnheim, Cohnfeld, Katz, and other variations)					Families bearing this name often claim descent from the priestly line originating with Aaron. It is one of the most common Jewish surnames, borne by approximately 2% to 3% of the global Jewish population. The surname has numerous variations, which differ by region and language.
Jaffe	Ashkenazi		Jerusalem (18th century)		
Gunzburg (Ginsburg, Ginsberg)	Ashkenazi				
Horowitz	Ashkenazi		Belorussia, Jerusalem (18th century)		
Katzenellenbogen	Ashkenazi		Jerusalem (18th century)		
Mintz	Ashkenazi		Hungary, Jerusalem (18th century)		
Rappaport	Ashkenazi		İzmir, Jerusalem (18th century)		
Treves	Ashkenazi		İzmir, Jerusalem (18th century)		
Rokeach	Ashkenazi		Amsterdam, Poland, Jerusalem (18th century)		

== Italian Jewish surnames ==
Name	Community	Early references	Later attested in	Meaning	Notes
Adato	Italian		Ottoman Palestine (19th century)		
Anav	Italian		Ottoman Palestine (19th century)		
Augustari	Italian		Ottoman Palestine (19th century)		
de Botton	Italian		Ottoman Palestine (19th century)		
Capuano	Italian		Ottoman Palestine (19th century)		
Chimino	Italian		Ottoman Palestine (19th century)		
Colon	Italian		Jerusalem (16th century)		
Gallico	Italian		Jerusalem (16th century)		
Luzzato	Italian	Italy	Jerusalem (16th and 18th century), Amsterdam		
Matalon	Italian		Ottoman Palestine (19th century)		
Miscian	Italian		Jerusalem (16th century)		
Perahiah	Italian		Ottoman Palestine (19th century)		
Piperno	Italian		Ottoman Palestine (19th century)		
Recanati	Italian		Ottoman Palestine (19th century)		
Salerno	Italian		Ottoman Palestine (19th century)		
Sonino	Italian		Ottoman Palestine (19th century)		
Talbi	Italian		Ottoman Palestine (19th century)		
Taranto	Italian		Ottoman Palestine (19th century)		
Tivoli	Italian		Jerusalem (16th century)		
Trabut	Italian		Jerusalem (16th century)		
Varsano	Italian		Ottoman Palestine (19th century)		
Ventura	Italian		Ottoman Palestine (19th century)		
Vital	Italian		Jerusalem (16th century)		

== See also ==
- List of Mizrahi Jewish surnames
- List of Sephardic Jewish surnames

== Bibliography ==
- Beider, Alexander (2023). "Surnames of Jewish People in the Land of Israel from the Sixteenth Century to the Beginning of the Twentieth Century". Genealogy. 7 (3): 49. doi:10.3390/genealogy7030049.
- Rottenberg, Dan (1986). Finding Our Fathers: A Guidebook to Jewish Genealogy (Reprint ed.). Genealogical Publishing Co. ISBN 0806311517.
