= List of Sephardic Jewish surnames =

Sephardic Jews have a diverse repertoire of surnames, with some originating in the Iberian Peninsula before the 1490s expulsions. Others were adopted afterward, either by Marrano families during forced conversions or by those returning to Judaism in their new centers of migration. Additionally, many Sephardic surnames were created or adapted in the countries where they resettled.

Common categories of Sephardic surnames include patronymic surnames, those derived from place names, and terms related to occupations, physical appearance, and other characteristics.

== List ==
=== A–B ===
Name	Community	Early references	Later attested in	Meaning	Notes
Abbas, Abbasi	Sephardic	Spain (13th century)	Turkey		
Abenafia		Spain (15th century)			
Abendana(n), Ibn Dana	Sephardic	Morocco (13th century)	London		
Abenmenasse		Spain (13th century)			
Aben Schoschan	Sephardic				
Abensour, Abensur	Sephardic	Spain	Morocco, Italy, Amsterdam, Hamburg		
Abi-Hasira	Moroccan	Morocco	Syria, Israel		
Abitbol	Moroccan	Morocco			
Abu Zimra					
Aboab		Spain (1263)	Holland, Italy, Turkey, Africa and United States		
Abravanel (Abarbanel, Abrabanel)	Sephardic				Historically associated with Davidic lineage
Absaban		Ottoman Palestine			
Abudarham (Abudaram, Abudaran, Abudarhan, Abudarhen)		Spain (13th century)			
Abulker	Sephardic		Italy, Algeria		
Abulafia (Abenefeia, Afia, Abolafia, Bolaffi, Bolaffey, Bolaffio)	Sephardic	Spain (12th century)	Italy, Salonica, Safed (16th century), Izmir, Jerusalem (18th century), Gelibolu, Tiberias, Hebron		
Abzaradiel	Sephardic		Jerusalem (16th century)		
Adjiman	Sephardic		Constantinople		
Adret		Spain (13th century)	Smyrna		
Aguilar	Sephardic	Valencia, Spain			
Aknin		Spain (1150)			
Alaish		Barcelona, Spain (1391)	Tunis, London		
Alascar	Sephardic		Jerusalem (16th century)		
Alashkr	Sephardic		Egypt		
Albalia (Abrabalia, Albala, Albalah, Albala, Alba, Alva)		Córdoba, Spain	Yugoslavia		Said to descend from a noble Judean family of the time of Emperor Titus (70 CE)
Albelda		Castille, Spain	Turkey		
Alhadef	Sephardic		Rhodes, Jerusalem (18th century)		
Alfakar	Sephardic	Spain (12th century)		"Potter"	
Alfandari			Smyrna, Constantinople, Jerusalem, Beirut	Derived from a Spanish locality, possibly Alfambra	Claims descent from Bezalel of Judah
Albotene	Sephardic		Safed (16th century), Jerusalem (16th century)		
Alcabez	Sephardic		Safed (16th century)		
Algazi			Izmir, Jerusalem (18th century)		
Algranati		Granada, Spain		Derived from Granada	
Alkalai (Alcalay)	Sephardic		Italy, Bulgaria, Yugoslavia, Jerusalem (18th century)	Derived from Kalai, near Madrid, Spain	
Almanzi		Italy (1700)		Supposedly derived from Almansa, Murcia	
Almoli (Almali, Almuli)				Arabic for "the one who raises up"	
Almosnino		Aragon, Spain	Jerusalem (16th century)	Arabic for "orator"	
Alnaqua (also Alnequa, Alnakar, Aluncawi, Ankoa)			North Africa (as Ankava)		
Altaras	Sephardic		Jerusalem (18th century)		
Amarillo	Sephardic		Salonica, Trikala, Jerusalem (18th century)		
Amigo		Temesvar, Hungary			
Ammar	Sephardic	(14th century)	North Africa		
Ardit (Arditi, Ardot, Ardut)		Aragon, Spain (15th century)	Turkey		
Arobas			Livorno, Maone, Curaçao		
Arougheti/Arouguete/Arogueti			Rhodes, Izmir, Buenos Aires		
Arragel	Sephardic	Spain (15th century)			
Aroeste		Arruesta: Olite, Navarre (1318); Arruest: Calatayud, Aragon (1492)	Monastir, Bulgaria, Rochester, Veuey-Montreux, Chile, Buenos Aires		
Asael	Sephardic		Jerusalem (18th century)		
Aseo	Sephardic		Jerusalem (18th century)		
Asherdies		Toledo, Spain (1297)			
Atias (Athias, Athia)			Ottoman Palestine, Jerusalem (16th century), Italy, Hamburg, Amsterdam, London		
(Ibn) Attar	Sephardic	(14th century)	North Africa	Arabic for "apotheracy", "spice dealer"	
Avila			Morocco, Spain (converted to Catholicism)		
Ayllon (Aelion, Aylion, Hillion)	Sephardic		Amsterdam, London, Salonica		
Azevedo	Sephardic		Amsterdam, London, Portugal		
Azulay, Azulai			Morocco, Italy, England, Israel		Descended from Spanish exiles who settled in Fez
Azriel		Girona, Spain (1160)	Rumelia, Frankfurt, Vilnius		
Baamonde, Bahamonde	Sephardic	Lugo, Spain (1492)			
Behar (Bahar, Bakhar, Bekhar)	Sephardic	Castille, Spain (1492)	Istanbul (Turkey), Izmir, Bulgaria, São Paulo, Buenos Aires, Temuco, Monastir, Mexico City, Jerusalem, Ottoman Palestine (19th century)	Hebrew acronym of "Ben Kevod Rabbi" (i.e. "son of the honorable Rabbi"); originally used in the form of "(son) Behar (father)"	Family tradition in Istanbul points to ancestral origins in Zaragoza; see Nissim Behar
Bejerano, Bedjarano	Sephardic		Plovdiv, Sofia, Kizanlik, Ruse, Istanbul, Turkey, Haifa, Ramat Gan, Bucharest, Buenos Aires	Derived from Bejar, Spain	
Belilhos			Amsterdam, Cochin		
Belifante			Turkey, Amsterdam		Descendants of Joseph Cohen Belifante, who fled Portugal for Turkey in 1526
Belisha			Juriti, Manaus, Obidos, Belem, Amazonia, Rio De Janeiro, Algiers, Blida, Constantine, Tunis, Tetouan, Mogador-Essaouira, Meknes, Casablanca, Morocco (18th century)	Derived from contraction of ben (son of) Elisha	
Ben Ezra	Sephardic		Izmir, Meknes, Fes, Casablanca, Oran, Mascara, Morocco, Safed (16th century)		
Ben Forado	Sephardic		Jerusalem (18th century)		
Ben Habib	Sephardic		Jerusalem (16th century)		
Ben Sanchi	Sephardic		Jerusalem (18th century)		
Benveniste	Sephardic	Narbonne (12th century)	Spain, Provence, Middle East, Safed, Bulgaria, Serbia, Vienna, Constantinople, Jerusalem (18th century)		
Benzamero		(13th century)	Leghorn, Italy		
Benzaqen		(17th century)			
Berab	Sephardic		Jerusalem (18th century)		
Besudo	Sephardic		Safed (16th century)		
Bibago / Bibas / Bibaz		(15th century)	Morocco		Associated with Abraham Bibago
Boton			Salonica		Emigrated from Spain to Salonica in 1492
Bravo			London		
Brito / de Brito					
Brudo	Sephardic		Turkey		Also recorded as a marrano family
Bueno		(16th century)	France, Italy, Holland, England, United States		
Burla			Turkey, Ottoman Palestine		
Busal			Salonica		

=== C–Z ===
Name	Community	Early references	Later attested in	Meaning	Notes
Cabessa		Toledo, Spain (13th century)	Morocco, United States		
Cabrera		Spain (14th century)			
Caceras / Caceras and other variations			Mexico, Portugal, Holland, England, Suriname, West Indies, New York, Philadelphia	Probably from Cáceres, Spain	
Calahora			Krakow, Poland		Lived in Krakow since the 16th century
Calay, Kalai, Calatayud	Sephardic	Calatayud, Spain (13th century)	Jerusalem (16th century)		
Caledro	Sephardic		Jerusalem (18th century)		
Camondo	Sephardic		Venice, Constantinople, Jerusalem (18th century), Paris		
Cansino		Oran (13th century)			
Cassuto	Sephardic		Amsterdam, Hamburg		
Carmona			Turkey	Derived from Carmona, Spain	
Caro	Sephardic	Spain (15th century)	Turkey, Safed, Russia, Germany, Switzerland, United States		
Castro	Sephardic	Spain and Portugal (15th century)	Bordeaux, Bayonne, Hamburg, Amsterdam and Jerusalem (16th century)		
Chelouche	Sephardic		Ottoman Palestine		
Clava			Amsterdam		
Coelho	Sephardic	Portugal (13th century)	Brazil, Amsterdam, London, Livorno, Israel, Tunis, Curacao		
Cohen (also Kahin, Coffen, Coen, Katz and other variations)					Families bearing this name often claim descent from the priestly line originating with Aaron. It is one of the most common Jewish surnames, borne by approximately 2% to 3% of the global Jewish population. The surname has numerous variations, which differ by region and language.
Comtino			Turkey		see Mordecai Comtino
Conforti, Conforte			Salonica, Turkey		see David Conforte
Corcos	Sephardic	Spain (13th century)	Italy, Gibraltar, Morocco		
Cordova, Cordoba	Sephardic		Amsterdam, Hamburg	Derived from Córdoba, Spain	
Cordovero	Sephardic		Ottoman Palestine (16th-century Safed)		see Gedaliah Cordovero, Moses Cordovero
Covo	Sephardic		Jerusalem (18th century)		
Crescas, Cresques			Barcelona		see Vidal Crescas
Curiel	Sephardic		Safed (16th century)		
Danon	Sephardic		Belgrade, Jerusalem (18th century), London, Smyrna, (Turkey), Bosnia		see Joseph ibn Danon of Belgrade
Dato	Sephardic		Safed (16th century)		
Davila	Sephardic			Derived from Ávila, Spain	
Falcon	Sephardic		Safed (16th century)		
Galante	Sephardic		Safed (16th century)		
Gaon		Vitoria, Spain (15th century)			
Gatigno (also Gatinho, Gattegno)	Sephardic	Spain (14th century)	Turkey	Derived from Gafines, France	
Gavison	Sephardic		Egypt		Family fled from Seville to Granada in 1391
Guedelha	Sephardic		Safed (16th century)		
da Leiria	Sephardic		Safed (16th century)		
Marhaim	Sephardic		Jerusalem (16th century)		
Masud	Sephardic		Jerusalem (16th century)		
de Mayo	Sephardic		Salonica, Jerusalem (18th century)		
Moreno Sephardic –295}}			Bayonne, London, Hamburg, Turkey		
Nabon / Navon			Turkey (Constantinople), Jerusalem		
Nahmias		(1112)	Jerusalem (16th century)		Ancient family of Toledo, Spain
Najara	Sephardic		Algiers, Tunis, Damascus, Gaza, Safed (16th century)	Derived from Nájera, Spain	see Israel ben Moses Najara
Oliveira, de Oliveira, Olibam, Oliban, Olivan, de Olibam		Safed (16th century), Aragon, Spain			
Palache (Palaggi, Falaji, Pallache)			Morocco, Turkey		First appeared in Medieval Spain as Palyaj
Pardo	Sephardic	Amsterdam (16th century)	Venice, America, Jerusalem (18th century)	Derived from prado, Spanish for "Meadow"	
Pimentel Sephardic Pepper Merchant - Spice Trade (16th & 17th century) Portugal, Amsterdam		Ramos (16 & 17 century) Spain, Mexico & Argentina			
da la Reina	Sephardic		Safed (16th century)		
Sagues	Sephardic		Safed (16th century)		
Sahalon	Sephardic		Safed (16th century)		
Samanon	Sephardic		Salonica, Jerusalem (18th century)		
Sarfati	Sephardic		Jerusalem (16th century)	Hebrew for "French", used for migrants from northern France	
Sarug	Sephardic		Safed (16th century)		
Sasson	Sephardic		India, England		Descended from the Toledan Ibn Shosan family (13th century); claims Davidic descent
Sasportas		Oran, Algeria (16th century)			
Suarez			Egypt		
Surujon	Sephardic		Safed		
Toledano (de Toledo)			Salonica, Jerusalem, Turkey, Africa, Holland and England.		
Torres		Spain (15th century)	France		
de Vidas	Sephardic		Safed (16th century), Jerusalem (16th century)		
Zacuto	Sephardic		Jerusalem (16th century)		

== Marrano surnames ==
Abudiente (Obediente)	Sephardic	Lisbon (16th century)	Amsterdam, Hamburg, London	Connected to the surname "Gideon"
Ames		London (1521)		
Antunyes		Portugal	Brazil, Amsterdam, Suriname, British West Indies	
Barassa			Amsterdam	
Bargas			Spain, France, Italy	
Barrios		Amsterdam (17th century)		
Barrocas		Lisbon (1603)	Holland	
Basurto		Spain (17th century)	Rouen, Holland	
Belmont				Descendants of Don Iago y Sampayo, who received Belmonte from King Manuel of Portugal in 1516
(de la) Caballeria / Cavalleria	(15th century)			Descendants of Solomon ibn Labi de la Caballeria
Carabajal (also Carvajal, Carabal, Caraballo, Caravajal, Carballo, Carbajal, Cavajal)			Mexico	
Chaves			London, Amsterdam	
Chirino	(15th century)			
Coronel			Spain, England, Holland, Palestine	Mixed early with Ashkenazi families
Correa			Portugal, Brussels, Antwerp, Amsterdam	see Isabella Correa
Cortissos			London,	see Jose Cortissos
Costa (also Acosta, Da Costa)			Holland, England, Italy	
Cota				Possibly connected to Costa; see Rodrigo Cota
Curiel, Couriel			Netherlands, Hamburg	Related to the Najara and Vitoria families
Delgado				Related to Cardenas
Guedelha			Safed (16th century)	
Hazan			Safed (16th century)	
Oliviera, de Oliveira, Oliva Olibam, Olivan			Safed (16th century)	

== See also ==
- Jewish surnames
- List of Ashkenazi Jewish surnames
- List of Mizrahi Jewish surnames

== Bibliography ==
- Beider, Alexander (2014). "Perspectives of Jewish Onomastics". International Institute for Jewish Geneogology. 8.
- Beider, Alexander (2023). "Surnames of Jewish People in the Land of Israel from the Sixteenth Century to the Beginning of the Twentieth Century". Genealogy. 7 (3): 49. doi:10.3390/genealogy7030049.
- Ben-Naeh, Yaron, ed. (2010). Turkey. Jewish communities in the East in the Nineteenth and Twentieth Centuries (in Hebrew). Jerusalem: Ben Zvi Institute, Ministry of Education (Israel).
- Bonnín, Pere (1998). Sangre judía (in Spanish). Barcelona: Flor del Viento Ediciones.
- Demsky, Aaron (2010). Pleasant Are Their Names: Jewish Names in the Sephardic Diaspora. Bethesda, Maryland: University Press of Maryland.
- Faiguenboim, Guilherme; Valadares, Paulo; Campagnano, Anna Rosa (2003). Dicionario Sefaradi De Sobrenomes / Dictionary of Sephardic Surnames. Sao Paulo: Fraiha. ISBN 85-85989-20-3.
- Rottenberg, Dan (1986). Finding Our Fathers: A Guidebook to Jewish Genealogy (Reprint ed.). Genealogical Publishing Co. ISBN 0806311517.
