= Rabinow =

Rabinow is a surname. Notable people with the surname include:

- Jacob Rabinow
- Paul Rabinow

== See also ==
- Rabin
- Rabinowitz (surname)
