= Samuil Rabinovich =

Soviet engineer

Samuil Pavlovich Rabinovich (Russian: Самуил Павлович Рабинович; 1909–1988) was a Soviet engineer, one of the founders of practical radiolocation, the chief designer of the first series of radar stations designed in the 1940s, 1950s and 1960s.

== Biography ==
Rabinovich was born in 1909 in the village of Kamenka, Dnipro Raion. From 1931 to 1937 he studied at the Moscow Institute of Communication Engineers. In the years 1937-1940 participated in creating the first practical radar station (radar) RUS-2 "Redoubt". This station was deployed in the war near the Moscow detected more than 200 German bombers and gave information about them to guide fighters and targeting anti-aircraft artillery.

From 1942, Rabinovich is deputy chief designer of the radar station CPA-2, and since 1945 - chief designer of the radar CPA-4 ("Ray"). For the first time in domestic practice, the station CPA-4 provided three modes: circular scanning, manual antenna control and automatic target tracking the angular coordinates. The first mode is used for target detection and monitoring of the traffic condition on the indicator, the second—for the detection of targets in specific sector before going to the auto maintenance and for coarse positioning, the third—to accurately determine the azimuth and elevation in automatic mode and manual slant range or semi-automatic way.

From 1956, Rabinovich is chief designer of the radar sighting of interceptor missiles and command transfer station (RSVPR) experimental missile defense system (NMD). Fully missile defense system first tested in March 1961 had shown the fundamental possibility of defeat warheads of ballistic missiles. This achievement had risen in a row with the launch of the first Sputnik, the first cosmonaut, and other accomplishments, which showed the highest scientific, technical and organizational level of defense enterprises and organizations of the Ministry of Defense.

In the 1970s was the chief designer of the radar ST-68 (5N59) - moving the three coordinates of the station to detect and track low-altitude targets in active and passive noise in the presence of strong reflections from the ground and in adverse weather conditions.

== Awards ==
- Order of the Red Star (1939)
- Stalin Prize (1950)
- Two Orders of the Red Banner of Labour (1954, 1964)
- Order of the Badge of Honour (1961)

== Biographical sources ==
- Scientific-Research Institute of Electro, History Enterprises https://www.niemi.ru/
- Milestones of the 35-year history TSNPO-MAK Vympel

- YB Kobzarev, first steps of Soviet radar, Nature Magazine, December 1985, http://vivovoco.rsl.ru/VV/JOURNAL/NATURE/OLD/RADAR.HTM
- By the 90th anniversary of the birth of Grigory Kisunko-first General Designer of domestic resources and systems, the Federal Agency for Industry, https://web.archive.org/web/20080213163450/http://www.rosprom.gov.ru/
- Short History of Engineering in, https://pvo.guns.ru/book/vniirt/index.htm
- The first round of Star Wars won SOVIET Union, the Independent Military Review, 2001, https://nvo.ng.ru/history/2001-03-23/5_round.html
- Kisunko Grigory "Sekrenaya Zone: Confessions of a master designer, Chapter 13, Contemporary, 1996.
