= Ronald J. Rabin =

American politician

Colonel (Ret.) Senator Ronald Rabin
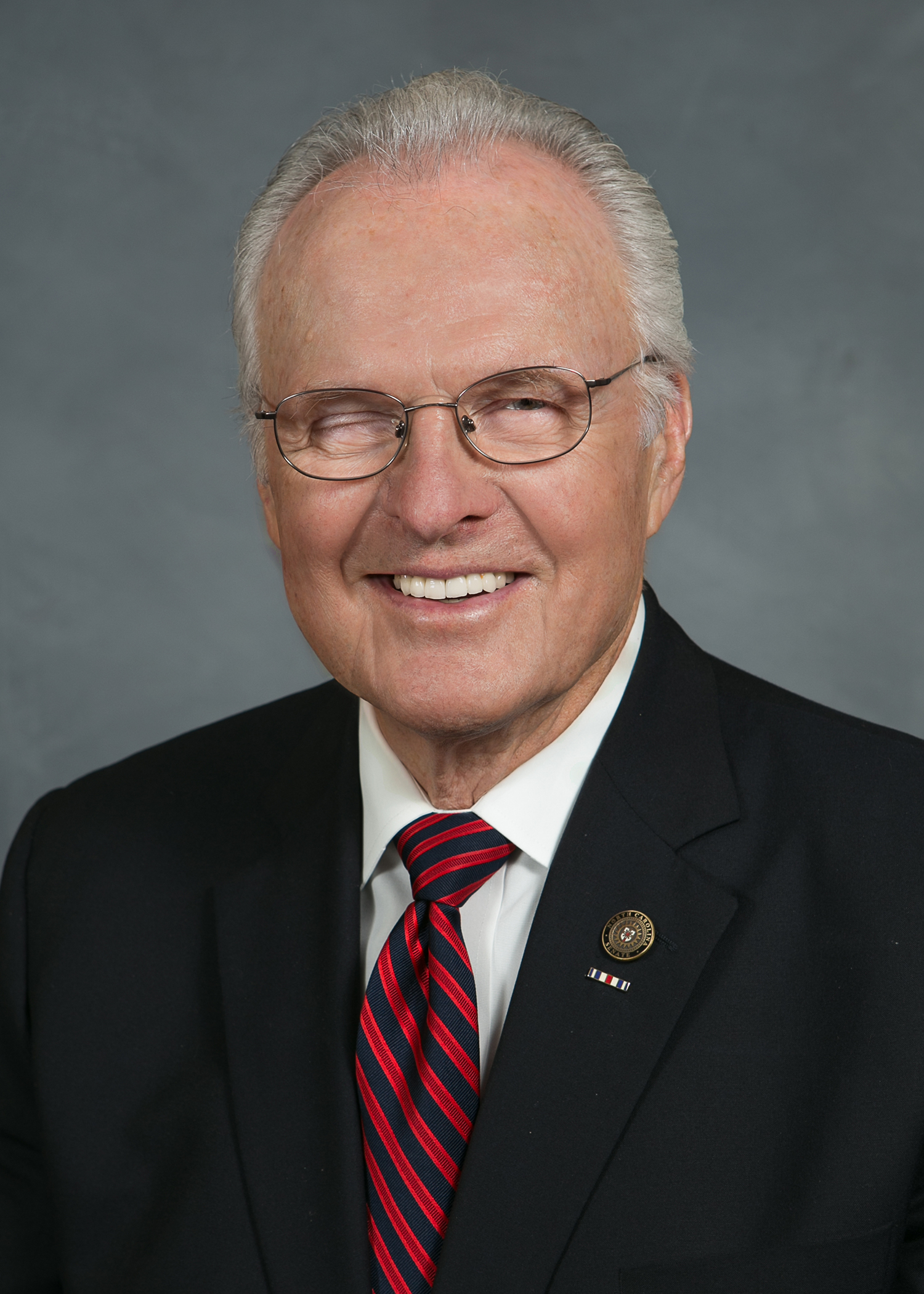

Member of the North Carolina Senate from the 12th district
- In office January 5, 2013 – January 6, 2019
- Preceded by: David Rouzer
- Succeeded by: Jim Burgin

Personal details
- Born: Ronald Joseph Rabin; May 16, 1932 (age 94) Rochester, New York
- Party: Republican
- Education: University of Southern Mississippi
- Occupation: former Army Colonel, consultant

Military service
- Allegiance: United States
- Branch/service: United States Army
- Years of service: 1956–1980
- Rank: Colonel
- Battles/wars: Vietnam War
- Awards: Silver Star Medal; Legion of Merit (4); Bronze Star Medal (3); Meritorious Service Medal; Air Medal (4)

Ronald Joseph Rabin (born May 16, 1932) is a Republican state senator in the state of North Carolina, representing the 12th district, encompassing Harnett, Johnston, Lee Counties. Rabin was born in Rochester, New York in 1932. He attended high school there and then went on to attend the University of Southern Mississippi where he was in the Reserve Officers' Training Corps program. He also attended the University of Alabama, where he was a member of the Sigma Alpha Mu fraternity. He was later commissioned into the Army as a second lieutenant of infantry. He is a business consultant in the aerospace and defense industries, having served previously in the United States Army as a Colonel for 24 years. He was elected to the North Carolina Senate on November 5, 2012, having defeated Democrat Brad Salmon.

Rabin is married to Mona and has 3 children: Mark, Scott, Rachel, and 9 grandchildren. He resides at Anderson Creek, Harnett County, North Carolina.

== Honors ==
In 2018, Rabin was listed as a Champion of the Family in the NC Values Coalition Scorecard.
