= Norrington Crossroads, North Carolina =

Coordinates: 35.353°N 78.913°W

Norrington is an unincorporated community located in Harnett County, North Carolina, United States. It is an African American community located a few miles south of Lillington, the county seat, and west of Bunnlevel. The community was settled as early as the 1860s.

== History ==
Norrington gets its name from the Northington family that lived in the vicinity of Raven Rock, North Carolina. The main road going through the community was path from the Northington Ferry that lead from Raleigh to Fayetteville. After the Civil War, the area was settled by freed slaves of plantations around the Harnett County area. Many of the families owned land and settled like the prominent Anthony W. Moore and his niece Bella McKellar of Seventy First Township, Cumberland County, North Carolina. Moore was very influential in the area having owned over one hundred acres. The Darrochs, a notable white family owned land in the area, whom still live there today in the Bunnlevel-Flat Branch area.

Prominent families in the area are: Darroch, McNeill, McLean, Campbell, Kelly, Cole, Clark, Moore, Cameron, Ross, Harrington, McKoy, Black, McDougald, Smith, Ray, and Buie.

== Churches ==
There are several churches in the area, but the oldest churches are Norrington AME Zion, located in the heart of the community, dating back to the late 1860s, Mount Olive United Methodist Church located off North Carolina Highway 27, and White Oak Missionary Baptist Church. The historic cemeteries in the area are Old Hundred and Darroch Family cemeteries. These cemeteries date back to the early 1800s.
