= Flatwoods, North Carolina =

- Unincorporated community
- Location within North Carolina Location within the United States
- Country: United States
- State: North Carolina
- County: Harnett
- Elevation: 246 ft (75 m)
- Time zone: UTC-5 (Eastern (EST))
  - Summer (DST): UTC-4 (EDT)
- Area codes: 910, 472

Flatwoods is an unincorporated community located in the Lillington Township of Harnett County, North Carolina, United States. It is a part of the Dunn Micropolitan Area, which is also a part of the greater Raleigh–Durham–Cary Combined Statistical Area (CSA) as defined by the United States Census Bureau.

== Landmarks ==
Flatwoods Community is located along U.S. Route 401 between Lillington and Bunnlevel. It is home to a few businesses, a few churches a fire department, a defunct golf course and a gravel pit.
