= Harnett, Harnett County, North Carolina =

Unincorporated community in North Carolina, US

Coordinates: 35°20′44″N 78°47′32″W

Harnett is an unincorporated community located along U.S. Route 401 in the southern part of Lillington Township in Harnett County, North Carolina, United States. Situated between Lillington and Bunnlevel (Powell 1968, p. 214), it is a part of the Dunn micropolitan area, which is also a part of the greater Raleigh–Durham–Cary combined statistical area as defined by the United States Census Bureau.
