= Juniper Creek (Cape Fear River tributary) =

Stream in North Carolina, USA

Juniper Creek Tributary to Cape Fear River
- Location of Juniper Creek mouth Juniper Creek (Cape Fear River tributary) (the United States)

Location
- Country: United States
- State: North Carolina
- County: Harnett
- City: Erwin

Physical characteristics
- Source: Thorntons Creek divide
  - location: about 1 mile south of Coats, North Carolina
  - coordinates: 35°23′11″N 078°40′07″W
  - elevation: 240 ft (73 m)
- Mouth: Cape Fear River
  - location: Erwin, North Carolina
  - coordinates: 35°19′28″N 078°41′47″W
  - elevation: 68 ft (21 m)
- Length: 5.05 mi (8.13 km)
- Basin size: 16.19 square miles (41.9 km^{2})
- Discharge
  - location: Cape Fear River
  - average: 18.09 cu ft/s (0.512 m^{3}/s) at mouth with Cape Fear River

Basin features
- Progression: Cape Fear River → Atlantic Ocean
- River system: Cape Fear River
- Tributaries
  - left: Stewart Creek
  - right: unnamed tributaries
- Bridges: Clayhole Road, Prospect Church Road, US 421, Old Stage Road

Juniper Creek is a 5.05 mi (8.13 km) long 3rd order tributary to the Cape Fear River in Harnett County, North Carolina.

== Variant names ==
According to the Geographic Names Information System, it has also been known historically as:

- Stuart Creek

== Course ==
Juniper Creek rises about 1 mile south of Coats, North Carolina and then flows southwest to join the Cape Fear River at Erwin, North Carolina.

== Watershed ==
Juniper Creek drains 16.19 square miles (41.9 km^{2}) of area, receives about 48.0 in/year of precipitation, has a wetness index of 502.31 and is about 21% forested.

== See also ==
- List of rivers of North Carolina
