= Cedar Creek (Cape Fear River tributary) =

Stream in North Carolina, USA

Cedar Creek Tributary to Cape Fear River
- Location of Cedar Creek Creek mouth Cedar Creek (Cape Fear River tributary) (the United States)

Location
- Country: United States
- State: North Carolina
- County: Harnett County

Physical characteristics
- Source: Camels Creek divide
  - location: about 1 mile north of Ryes, North Carolina
  - coordinates: 35°26′41″N 078°59′48″W
  - elevation: 415 ft (126 m)
- Mouth: Cape Fear River
  - location: about 6 miles northeast of Ryes, North Carolina
  - coordinates: 35°28′45″N 078°56′31″W
  - elevation: 125 ft (38 m)
- Length: 4.92 mi (7.92 km)
- Basin size: 5.74 square miles (14.9 km^{2})
- Discharge
  - location: Cape Fear River
  - average: 6.63 cu ft/s (0.188 m^{3}/s) at mouth with Cape Fear River

Basin features
- Progression: Cape Fear River → Atlantic Ocean
- River system: Cape Fear River
- Tributaries
  - left: unnamed tributaries
  - right: unnamed tributaries
- Bridges: Patterson Road, Cool Springs Road

Cedar Creek is a 4.92 mi (7.92 km) long 1st order tributary to the Cape Fear River in Harnett County, North Carolina. This stream forms the southwestern boundary of Raven Rock State Park.

== Course ==
Cedar Creek rises about 1 mile north of Ryes, North Carolina and then flows northeast to join the Cape Fear River about 6 miles northeast of Rye, North Carolina.

== Watershed ==
Cedar Creek drains 5.74 square miles (14.9 km^{2}) of area, receives about 47.2 in/year of precipitation, has a wetness index of 372.42 and is about 69% forested.

== See also ==
- List of rivers of North Carolina
