= Daniels Creek (Cape Fear River tributary) =

Stream in North Carolina, USA

Daniels Creek Tributary to Cape Fear River
- Location of Daniels Creek Creek mouth Daniels Creek (Cape Fear River tributary) (the United States)

Location
- Country: United States
- State: North Carolina
- County: Harnett County

Physical characteristics
- Source: Upper Little River divide
  - location: pond about 0.1 miles north of Seminole, North Carolina
  - coordinates: 35°26′14″N 079°01′02″W
  - elevation: 425 ft (130 m)
- Mouth: Cape Fear River
  - location: about 3 miles southwest of Cokesbury, North Carolina
  - coordinates: 35°30′02″N 078°57′27″W
  - elevation: 132 ft (40 m)
- Length: 7.99 mi (12.86 km)
- Basin size: 16.04 square miles (41.5 km^{2})
- Discharge
  - location: Cape Fear River
  - average: 18.27 cu ft/s (0.517 m^{3}/s) at mouth with Cape Fear River

Basin features
- Progression: Cape Fear River → Atlantic Ocean
- River system: Cape Fear River
- Tributaries
  - left: unnamed tributaries
  - right: unnamed tributaries
- Bridges: Lawrence Road, Shue Road

Daniels Creek is a 7.99 mi (12.86 km) long 3rd order tributary to the Cape Fear River in Harnett County, North Carolina.

== Variant names ==
According to the Geographic Names Information System, it has also been known historically as:

- McPhersons Creek

== Course ==
Daniels Creek rises in a pond about 0.1 miles north of Seminole, North Carolina and then flows northeasterly to join the Cape Fear River about 3 miles southwest of Cokesbury, North Carolina.

== Watershed ==
Daniels Creek drains 16.04 square miles (41.5 km^{2}) of area, receives about 47.3 in/year of precipitation, has a wetness index of 396.45 and is about 59% forested.

== See also ==
- List of rivers of North Carolina
