= Cape Fear, Harnett County, North Carolina =

Unincorporated community in North Carolina, US

Coordinates: 35°25′31″N 78°48′53″W

Cape Fear is an unincorporated community located along North Carolina Highway 210 in the Neills Creek Township of Harnett County, North Carolina, United States, near the town of Lillington. It is a part of the Dunn Micropolitan Area, which is also a part of the greater Raleigh–Durham–Cary Combined Statistical Area (CSA) as defined by the United States Census Bureau.

The community generally lies near the north bank of the Cape Fear River. Prominent nearby landmarks include the Cape Fear Presbyterian Church.
