= Harnett County Library System =

Library system in North Carolina, US

Coordinates: 35.4196°N 78.8104°W

The Harnett County Library System is based in Lillington, Harnett County, North Carolina, in the United States. It has branches in Angier, Benhaven, Coats, Dunn, Erwin, Anderson Creek Primary School, and the Boone Trail Community Center and Library. The population served is 128,140. The main library building in Lillington has 14,395 square feet and employs 14.5 full-time-equivalent staff.

== History ==
In 2014 the Harnett County Library System joined the NC Cardinal system. The collaboration of materials has benefited not only the individual patrons but also local small-town libraries across North Carolina.

== Local History Room ==
The Harnett County Public Library's Local History Room provides basic research materials to historians and genealogists with an emphasis on Harnett County and the Cape Fear Valley.

Unique materials in the local history collection include a vertical file, obituary file, and picture file (from the collections of the late Talbott McNeill Stewart and Luci Uzzle) which are viewable on the library's online catalog. The library also has a small collection of old and new maps, some local schools' yearbooks, and a variety of photographs and documents from the late 1800s to mid 1900s that are in the process of being archived. The library also has a folder for each senior class of Lillington High School from 1944-1977.

The library owns microfilm copies of Harnett County Census records, 1790-1930 which is also available through the State Library in Raleigh. The local history collection also includes the N.C. Folklore Society Journal, the N.C. Historical Review, and other literary and scholarly publications from UNC Chapel Hill and Duke. In addition, the library owns a collection of primary source materials covering North Carolina History from the earliest days of the colony to the American Civil War.

The Local History Room is now located within the computer lab and is open during regular library hours. Archival materials are available to view by appointment.

Digital NC hosts many of the Local History Photographs
