= Camels Creek (Cape Fear River tributary) =

Stream in North Carolina, US

Camels Creek Tributary to Cape Fear River
- Location of Camels Creek Creek mouth Camels Creek (Cape Fear River tributary) (the United States)

Location
- Country: United States
- State: North Carolina
- County: Harnett County

Physical characteristics
- Source: Upper Little River divide
  - location: about 0.25 miles north of Ryes, North Carolina
  - coordinates: 35°26′22″N 078°59′45″W
  - elevation: 435 ft (133 m)
- Mouth: Cape Fear River
  - location: about 6 miles northeast of Boone Trail, North Carolina
  - coordinates: 35°28′36″N 078°55′28″W
  - elevation: 123 ft (37 m)
- Length: 7.00 mi (11.27 km)
- Basin size: 10.68 square miles (27.7 km^{2})
- Discharge
  - location: Cape Fear River
  - average: 11.90 cu ft/s (0.337 m^{3}/s) at mouth with Cape Fear River

Basin features
- Progression: Cape Fear River → Atlantic Ocean
- River system: Cape Fear River
- Tributaries
  - left: unnamed tributaries
  - right: unnamed tributaries
- Bridges: Patterson Road, Cool Springs Road

Camels Creek is a 7.00 mi (11.27 km) long 2nd order tributary to the Cape Fear River in Harnett County, North Carolina. The lower reaches of this stream flow through Raven Rock State Park.

== Course ==
Camels Creek rises about 0.25 miles north of Ryes, North Carolina, and then flows northeasterly to join the Cape Fear River about 6 miles northeast of Boone Trail, North Carolina.

== Watershed ==
Camels Creek drains 10.68 square miles (27.7 km^{2}) of area, receives about 46.7 in/year of precipitation, has a wetness index of 403.85 and is about 57% forested.

== See also ==
- List of rivers of North Carolina
