= Dry Creek (Cape Fear River tributary) =

Stream in North Carolina, USA

Dry Creek Tributary to Cape Fear River
- Location of Dry Creek Creek mouth Dry Creek (Cape Fear River tributary) (the United States)

Location
- Country: United States
- State: North Carolina
- County: Harnett

Physical characteristics
- Source: Buies Creek divide
  - location: about 4 miles northeast of Lillington, North Carolina
  - coordinates: 35°27′52″N 078°47′15″W
  - elevation: 272 ft (83 m)
- Mouth: Cape Fear River
  - location: about 0.25 miles north of Lillington, North Carolina
  - coordinates: 35°24′06″N 078°47′50″W
  - elevation: 108 ft (33 m)
- Length: 6.03 mi (9.70 km)
- Basin size: 4.70 square miles (12.2 km^{2})
- Discharge
  - location: Cape Fear River
  - average: 5.00 cu ft/s (0.142 m^{3}/s) at mouth with Cape Fear River

Basin features
- Progression: Cape Fear River → Atlantic Ocean
- River system: Cape Fear River
- Tributaries
  - left: unnamed tributaries
  - right: unnamed tributaries
- Bridges: Harnett Central Road, Dry Creek Road, Old Coats Road, US 421-NC 27

Dry Creek is a 6.03 mi (9.70 km) long 3rd order tributary to the Cape Fear River in Harnett County, North Carolina.

== Course ==
Dry Creek rises about 4 miles north of Lillington, North Carolina and then follows a southerly course to join the Cape Fear River about 0.25 miles northeast of Lillington.

== Watershed ==
Dry Creek drains 4.70 square miles (12.2 km^{2}) of area, receives about 46.1 in/year of precipitation, has a wetness index of 534.70 and is about 24% forested.

== See also ==
- List of rivers of North Carolina
