= Flat Branch, North Carolina =

- Unincorporated community
- Location within North Carolina Location within the United States
- Coordinates: 35°18′49″N 78°53′04″W
- Country: United States
- State: North Carolina
- County: Harnett
- Elevation: 249 ft (76 m)
- Time zone: UTC-5 (Eastern (EST))
  - Summer (DST): UTC-4 (EDT)
- Area codes: 910, 472
- GNIS feature ID: 985153

Flat Branch is an unincorporated community located in the Anderson Creek Township of Harnett County, North Carolina, United States. It is a part of the Dunn Micropolitan Area, which is also a part of the greater Raleigh–Durham–Cary Combined Statistical Area (CSA) as defined by the United States Census Bureau.

== Geography ==
Flat Branch is centered at the intersection of Darroch road, Elliott Bridge road and North Carolina Highway 210.

== Landmarks ==
It is home to three landmarks: Flat Branch Covenant Presbyterian Church (founded in 1873), Flat Branch Volunteer Fire Department, and Countryside Monuments. At one time it was home to two gas stations, one of which owned by the Shaw family and the other (presently Countryside Monuments) operated by the Strickland family where they also had a barbershop. Behind the store owned by the Strickland family was a feed and seed store owned by the Butts family. It is also home to Payola Post Office, a building of unique structure consisting of a log exterior, one room, and no windows. It is believed to be one of the last surviving structures within the county to have a stick chimney.
