= Turlington, North Carolina =

Unincorporated community in North Carolina, US

Coordinates: 35°21′49″N 78°39′50″W

Turlington is an unincorporated community in eastern Harnett County, North Carolina, United States, situated between the towns of Coats and Erwin, North Carolina. It is a part of the Dunn Micropolitan Area, which is also a part of the greater Raleigh–Durham–Cary Combined Statistical Area (CSA) as defined by the United States Census Bureau.

Other names for the community previously have included Slocumb Crossroads or Turlington Crossroads (Powell 1968, p. 503). An unsuccessful movement was undertaken in 1893 to have the Harnett County seat moved from Lillington to Turlington Crossroads (Hairr 2002, p. 86).
