= Shawtown, North Carolina =

- Unincorporated community
- Location within North Carolina Location within the United States
- Coordinates: 35°23′04″N 78°49′50″W
- Country: United States
- State: North Carolina
- County: Harnett
- Elevation: 256 ft (78 m)
- Time zone: UTC-5 (Eastern (EST))
  - Summer (DST): UTC-4 (EDT)
- Area codes: 910, 472
- GNIS feature ID: 1022568

Shawtown is an unincorporated community located in the Lillington Township of Harnett County, North Carolina, United States, on the southern side of the town of Lillington. It is a part of the Dunn Micropolitan Area, which is also a part of the greater Raleigh–Durham–Cary Combined Statistical Area (CSA) as defined by the United States Census Bureau.
