= Neills Creek =

Stream in North Carolina, USA

Neills Creek Tributary to Cape Fear River
- Location of Neills Creek Creek mouth Neills Creek (the United States)

Location
- Country: United States
- State: North Carolina
- County: Harnett; Wake

Physical characteristics
- Source: Kenneth Creek and Black Creek divides
  - location: pond in Holland, North Carolina
  - coordinates: 35°34′08″N 078°46′18″W
  - elevation: 385 ft (117 m)
- Mouth: Cape Fear River
  - location: about 1 mile north of Lillington, North Carolina
  - coordinates: 35°25′12″N 078°49′29″W
  - elevation: 112 ft (34 m)
- Length: 12.94 mi (20.82 km)
- Basin size: 38.92 square miles (100.8 km^{2})
- Discharge
  - location: Cape Fear River
  - average: 40.56 cu ft/s (1.149 m^{3}/s) at mouth with Cape Fear River

Basin features
- Progression: Cape Fear River → Atlantic Ocean
- River system: Cape Fear River
- Tributaries
  - left: unnamed tributaries
  - right: Kenneth Creek
- Bridges: Holland Hills Drive, Rawls Church Road, Chalybeate Springs Road, Bluff Ridge Lane, Harnett Central Road, US 401

Neills Creek is a 12.94 mi (20.82 km) long 4th order tributary to the Cape Fear River in Harnett County, North Carolina. Neill Creek is the only stream of its name in the United States.

== Variant names ==
According to the Geographic Names Information System, it has also been known historically as:

- Kenneth Creek
- Neal Creek
- Neals Creek
- Neils Creek

== Course ==
Neills Creek rises in a pond in Holland, North Carolina in Wake County and then flows south to Harnett County to join the Cape Fear River about 1 mile north of Lillington, North Carolina.

== Watershed ==
Neills Creek drains 38.92 square miles (100.8 km^{2}) of area, receives about 46.6 in/year of precipitation, has a wetness index of 446.81 and is about 33% forested.

== See also ==
- List of rivers of North Carolina
