= Neills Creek Township, Harnett County, North Carolina =

Coordinates: 35.3798869°N 78.7356959°W

Neills Creek Township, North Carolina
- Township
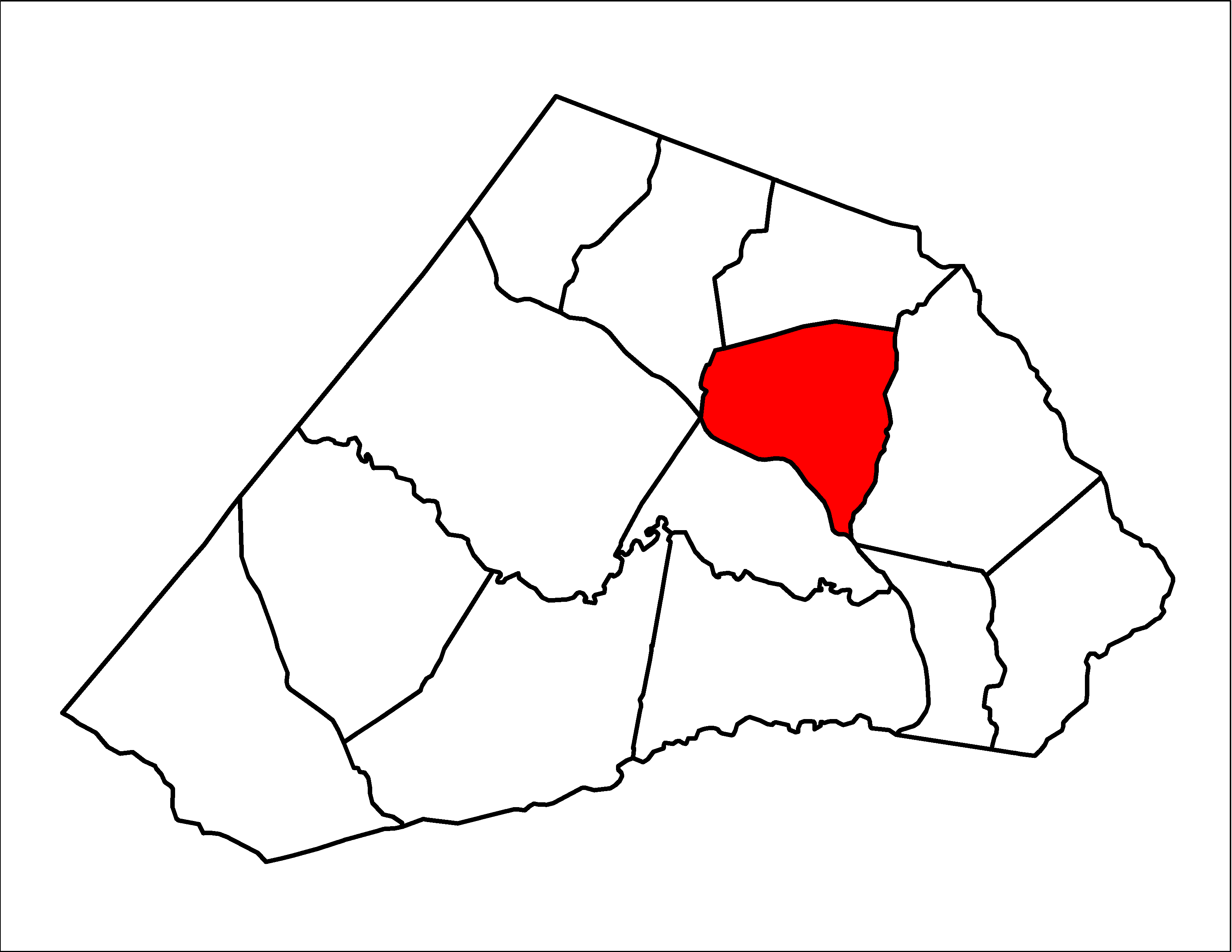
- Neills Creek Twp in HarnettCounty NC
- Interactive map of Neills Creek Township, North Carolina
- Country: United States
- State: North Carolina
- County: Harnett

Government
  - Type: County Board of Commissioners
  - County Manager: George Wood, Interim

Area
  - Total: 32.84 sq mi (85.1 km^{2})

Population (2010)
  - Total: 5,291
- Time zone: UTC-5 (Eastern (EST))
  - Summer (DST): UTC-4 (EDT)
- ZIP code: 27546
- Area codes: 910, 472

Neills Creek Township is one of thirteen townships in Harnett County, North Carolina, United States. The township had a population of 5,921 according to the 2000 census. It is a part of the Dunn Micropolitan Area, which is also a part of the greater Raleigh–Durham–Cary Combined Statistical Area (CSA) as defined by the United States Census Bureau.

Geographically, Neills Creek Township occupies 32.84 square miles (85.1 km^{2}) in Harnett County. Parts of the town of Lillington are now located in the township as well as the unincorporated community of Buies Creek, home of Campbell University, and Cape Fear.

The western boundary of Neills Creek township is bounded by Neills Creek, a tributary of the Cape Fear River.
