= Olivia, North Carolina =

- Unincorporated community
- Location within North Carolina Location within the United States
- Coordinates: 35°21′35″N 79°06′35″W
- Country: United States
- State: North Carolina
- County: Harnett
- Elevation: 305 ft (93 m)
- Time zone: UTC-5 (Eastern (EST))
  - Summer (DST): UTC-4 (EDT)
- Area code: 919
- GNIS feature ID: 1021748

Olivia is an unincorporated community centered in the Barbecue Township of Harnett County, North Carolina, United States, but also covering parts of Anderson Creek Township near the Lee County line. It is a part of the Dunn Micropolitan Area, which is also a part of the greater Raleigh–Durham–Cary Combined Statistical Area (CSA) as defined by the United States Census Bureau.

== History ==
Olivia was originally named "Rock Branch" and was founded circa 1865 but the name was changed in 1913 to honor W.J. Olive, who introduced Flue-cured tobacco to the community (Powell 1968, p. 365).

== Demographics ==
Olivia's Zip Code Tabulation Area (Zip Code 28368) has a population of about 443 as of the 2000 census. The population is 50.6% male and 49.4% female. About 83.1% of the population is white, 11.1% African-American, 5.8% Hispanic, 0.9% Asian, and 2.8% of other races. 1.8% of people are two or more races and there is one person of Native descent American Indians.

The median household income is $20,500 with 31.3% of the population living below the poverty line.

== Notable person ==
- Herb Thomas - NASCAR champion
