= Campbell University Adult and Online Education =

Part of Campbell University, Adult and Online Education (AOE) is an extension of the traditional undergraduate programs offered on the Main Campus in Buies Creek, NC.

Campbell University AOE offers degree programs that can be completed at Fort Bragg Military Installation, Camp Lejune Military Installation, the Raleigh Campus, and 100% online programs.
