= Thorbiskope =

Historic house in North Carolina, United States

- U.S. National Register of Historic Places
- Location within North Carolina Location within the United States
- Location: Off SR 2049 at SR 2050, near Bunnlevel, North Carolina
- Coordinates: 35°13′58″N 78°53′51″W
- Area: 2.9 acres (1.2 ha)
- Built: c. 1820, c. 1848
- Architectural style: Greek Revival, Georgian-Federal Coastal Cottage
- NRHP reference No.: 86000132
- Added to NRHP: January 23, 1986

Thorbiskope, also known as the John Elliot House, is a historic plantation house located near Bunnlevel, Harnett County, North Carolina. It was built in two sections. The earliest section was built about 1820, and is a 1 1/2-story, Georgian / Federal style frame Coastal Cottage frame dwelling that forms the rear ell. About 1848, the two-story, five bay by two bay, Greek Revival style front section was added. It features a one-bay front portico.

It was listed on the National Register of Historic Places in 1986.
