= Thorntons Creek (Cape Fear River tributary) =

Stream in North Carolina, USA

Thorntons Creek Tributary to Cape Fear River
- Location of Thorntons Creek mouth Thorntons Creek (Cape Fear River tributary) (the United States)

Location
- Country: United States
- State: North Carolina
- County: Harnett

Physical characteristics
- Source: Buies Creek divide
  - location: pond about 1.5 miles northwest of Coats, North Carolina
  - coordinates: 35°26′13″N 078°41′00″W
  - elevation: 265 ft (81 m)
- Mouth: Cape Fear River
  - location: about 2 miles northwest of Erwin, North Carolina
  - coordinates: 35°21′26″N 078°43′49″W
  - elevation: 95 ft (29 m)
- Length: 6.92 mi (11.14 km)
- Basin size: 12.37 square miles (32.0 km^{2})
- Discharge
  - location: Cape Fear River
  - average: 13.62 cu ft/s (0.386 m^{3}/s) at mouth with Cape Fear River

Basin features
- Progression: Cape Fear River → Atlantic Ocean
- River system: Cape Fear River
- Tributaries
  - left: unnamed tributaries
  - right: unnamed tributaries
- Bridges: NC 27, Fleming Road, Brick Mill Road, US 421, Old Stage Road

Thorntons Creek is a 6.52 mi (10.49 km) long 3rd order tributary to the Cape Fear River in Harnett County, North Carolina.

== Course ==
Thorntons Creek rises in a pond about 1.5 miles northwest of Coats, North Carolina and then flows southwest to join the Cape Fear River about two miles northwest of Erwin, North Carolina.

== Watershed ==
Thorntons Creek drains 12.37 square miles (32.0 km^{2}) of area, receives about 47.6 in/year of precipitation, has a wetness index of 484.72 and is about 24% forested.

== See also ==
- List of rivers of North Carolina
