= Poorhouse Creek (Cape Fear River tributary) =

Stream in North Carolina, US

Poorhouse Creek Tributary to Cape Fear River
- Location of Poorhouse Creek Creek mouth Poorhouse Creek (Cape Fear River tributary) (the United States)

Location
- Country: United States
- State: North Carolina
- County: Harnett
- City: Lillington

Physical characteristics
- Source: Indian Branch divide
  - location: Lillington, North Carolina
  - coordinates: 35°23′36″N 078°50′09″W
  - elevation: 265 ft (81 m)
- Mouth: Cape Fear River
  - location: about 0.5 miles east of Lillington, North Carolina
  - coordinates: 35°23′49″N 078°47′19″W
  - elevation: 105 ft (32 m)
- Length: 4.18 mi (6.73 km)
- Basin size: 4.67 square miles (12.1 km^{2})
- Discharge
  - location: Cape Fear River
  - average: 4.97 cu ft/s (0.141 m^{3}/s) at mouth with Cape Fear River

Basin features
- Progression: Cape Fear River → Atlantic Ocean
- River system: Cape Fear River
- Tributaries
  - left: unnamed tributaries
  - right: unnamed tributaries
- Bridges: Emilies Crossing Way, NC 27, Shawtown Road, NC 210, US 401, Adams Road, Ross Road

Poorhouse Creek is a 4.18-mile-long (6.73 km), second-order tributary to the Cape Fear River in Harnett County, North Carolina. It rises in Lillington, North Carolina, and then flows southeast, curving north to join the Cape Fear River about 0.5 miles east of Lillington, and drains 4.67 sq mi (12.1 km^{2}) of area, receives about 46.2 in/year of precipitation, has a wetness index of 538.0, and is about 28% forested.

== See also ==
- List of rivers of North Carolina
