= Grove Township, Harnett County, North Carolina =

Township in Harnett County, North Carolina, U.S.

Coordinates: 35.3798869°N 78.7356959°W

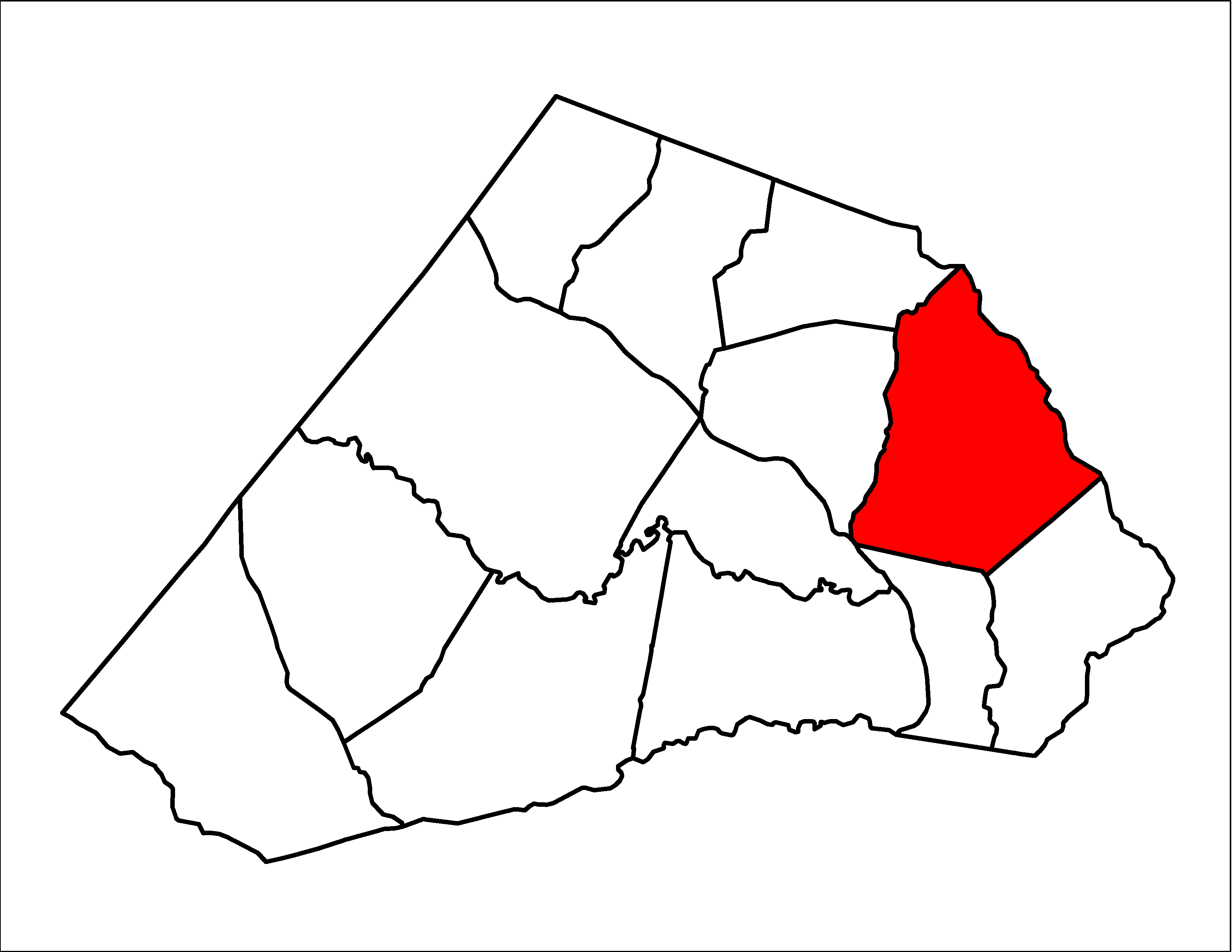
Location of Grove Township in Harnett County, N.C.

Grove Township is one of thirteen townships in Harnett County, North Carolina, United States. The township had a population of 9,475 according to the 2000 census. It is a part of the Dunn Micropolitan Area, which is also a part of the greater Raleigh–Durham–Cary Combined Statistical Area (CSA) as defined by the United States Census Bureau.

Geographically, Grove Township occupies 53.63 square miles (138.9 km^{2}) in northeastern Harnett County. The only incorporated municipality within Grove Township is Coats. Several unincorporated communities are also located in Grove Township, including Turlington. The township's eastern border is with Johnston County.
