= Summer Villa and McKay–Salmon House =

Historic plantation complex in North Carolina, United States

- Summer Villa and the McKay–Salmon House
- U.S. National Register of Historic Places
- U.S. Historic district
- Location within North Carolina Location within the United States
- Nearest city: SR 1291, near Lillington, North Carolina
- Coordinates: 35°24′18″N 78°51′54″W
- Area: 45 acres (18 ha)
- Built: 1849, c. 1885
- Architectural style: Classical Revival, Greek Revival
- NRHP reference No.: 85000902
- Added to NRHP: April 25, 1985

Summer Villa and McKay–Salmon House is a historic plantation complex and national historic district located near Lillington, Harnett County, North Carolina. It encompasses seven contributing buildings on a rural farm complex. Summer Villa was built about 1849, and is a two-story, five-bay, Greek Revival style dwelling updated in the early 20th century Classical Revival style. It features a central, two-story pedimented portico supported by monumental Doric order columns with a one-story wraparound porch. The outbuildings associated with Summer Villa include the "Playhouse", carriage house (c. 1850), corn crib and three outbuildings. The McKay–Salmon House built in the last quarter of the 19th century and is a one-story decorated frame cottage.

It was listed on the National Register of Historic Places in 1985.
