= Mount Pisgah (unincorporated community), North Carolina =

Unincorporated community in North Carolina, US

Coordinates: 35.378°N 78.713°W

Mount Pisgah is a small unincorporated community located on U.S. Highway 421 in the Grove Township, Harnett County, North Carolina. It is located between Buies Creek, North Carolina and Erwin, North Carolina. The community has an Erwin zip code of 28339. The area is a predominantly African American community dating to the Reconstruction era.

The focal point of the community is Mount Pisgah Harnett Original Free Will Baptist Church. It was established in 1860 in a local white Baptist Church in Coats, North Carolina. They were able to obtain land later on and start their own building.

Pisgah Top Bible Church Of God is a local church with similar origins to Mount Pisgah Church. Ryals Memorial is the local cemetery in the area, named after the affluent black Ryals family in the community.
