= Barbecue Township, Harnett County, North Carolina =

Township in Harnett County, North Carolina, U.S.

Coordinates: 35.3507661°N 79.0419053°W

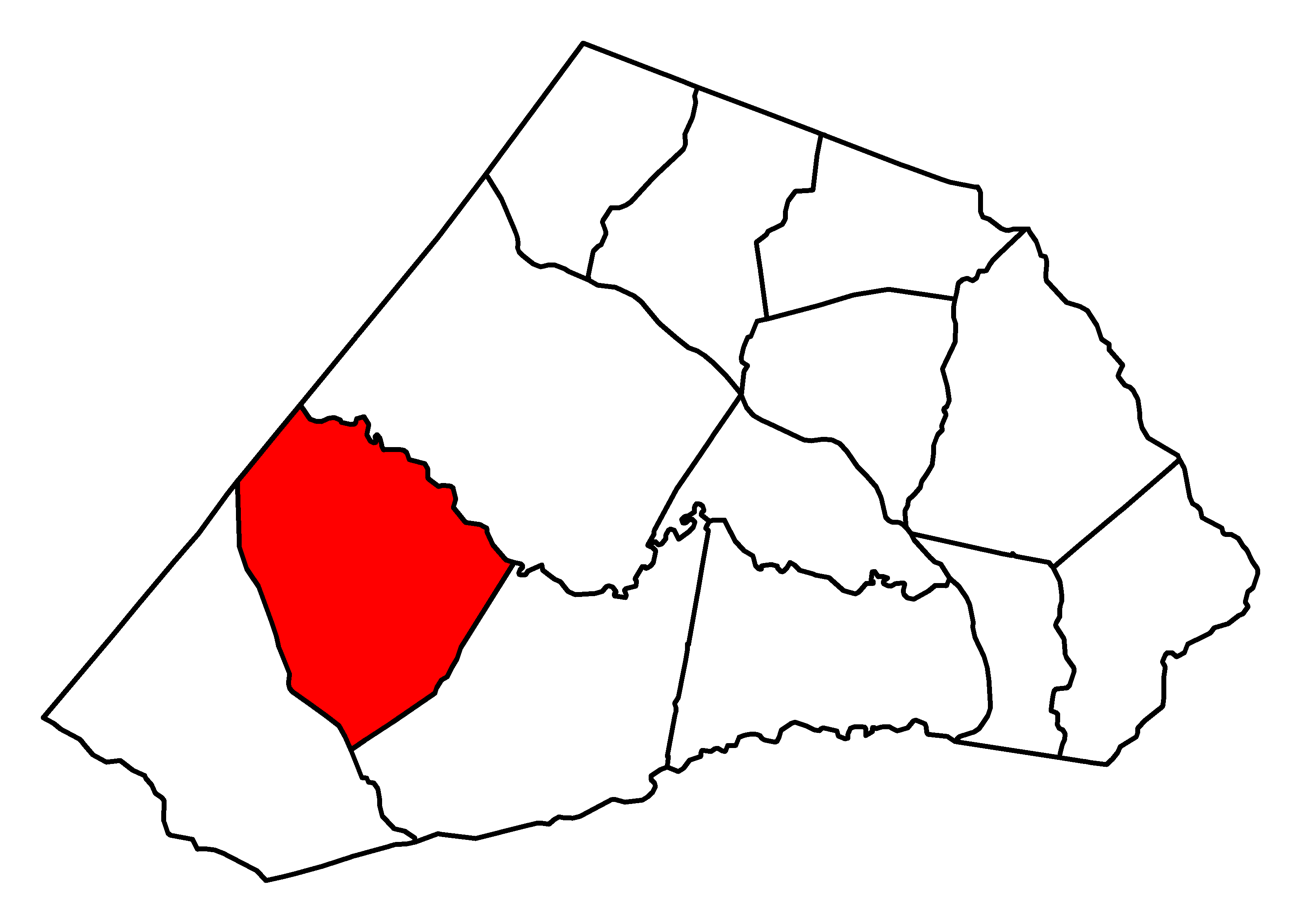
Location of Barbecue Township in Harnett County, N.C.

Barbecue Township is one of 13 townships in Harnett County, North Carolina, United States. According to the U.S. Census Bureau, the population of Barbecue Township was 17,033 in 2010, increased to 20,531 in 2020, and slightly declined to 19,828 in 2021. It is a part of the Dunn Micropolitan Area, which is also a part of the greater Raleigh–Durham–Cary combined statistical area as defined by the United States Census Bureau.

Geographically, Barbecue Township occupies 59.65 square miles (154.5 km^{2}) in southwestern Harnett County. No incorporated municipalities are located in Barbecue Township, but several unincorporated communities are located here, including the communities of Barbecue, Olivia, and Pineview.
