= Pineview, North Carolina =

Unincorporated community in North Carolina, US

Coordinates: 35°18′23″N 79°05′22″W

Pineview is an unincorporated community located in the Barbecue Township of Harnett County, North Carolina, United States. It is a part of the Dunn Micropolitan Area, which is also a part of the greater Raleigh–Durham–Cary Combined Statistical Area (CSA) as defined by the United States Census Bureau.

The community is centered on the intersection of North Carolina Highway 87 and North Carolina Highway 27. Pineview was formerly a great producer of dewberries (Powell 1968, p. 384).
