= Barbecue, North Carolina =

Unincorporated community in North Carolina, US

Coordinates: 35°20′10″N 79°02′19″W

Barbecue is an unincorporated community located in the Barbecue Township of Harnett County, North Carolina, United States. It is a part of the Dunn micropolitan area, which is also a part of the greater Raleigh–Durham–Cary combined statistical area as defined by the United States Census Bureau.

== Etymology ==
An early settler to the area named "Red" McNeill saw steam rising from a nearby creek. It reminded him of the meat-cooking pits he had seen in the Caribbean, and he named the creek Barbecue Creek. The name became official in the early 1750s, as Scottish Gaelic-speaking settlers began migrating into the area.

== History ==
An early minister of the Barbecue Presbyterian Church was Rev. Iain Beutan (John Bethune), a native of Glenelg and ancestor of actor Christopher Plummer, who, around 1773, famously persuaded poet Iain mac Mhurchaidh, a major figure in Scottish Gaelic literature, to emigrate from Kintail to the Colony of North Carolina.

As in other Gaelic-speaking communities in North Carolina, early Reformed worship at the Barbecue Presbyterian Church continued the 16th-century practice of congregational singing of exclusive psalmody in Scottish Gaelic, in an a cappella form called precenting the line.

The church's attendees during colonial times included Flora MacDonald, a member of Clan MacDonald of Sleat, who had famously helped Prince Charles Edward Stuart escape arrest following his defeat at the Battle of Culloden in April 1746.

Along with Iain mac Mhurchaidh and Flora MacDonald's husband, Rev. Beutan sided with King George III at the outbreak of the American Revolution and served as a Loyalist military chaplain during what was later dubbed, "the Insurrection of Clan Donald." Rev. Bethune was taken prisoner by Patriot militia following the Battle of Moore's Creek Bridge on 28 February 1776 and was imprisoned in Philadelphia with the other Loyalist officers. After first fleeing to British-held Montreal, Rev. Bethune ultimately settled among his fellow Gaels at Williamstown, in Glengarry County, Ontario, where he organized the first Presbyterian Church in Upper Canada.

Despite Rev. Bethune's Loyalism, both the church and the local district were known afterward as, "an island of Whigs in a sea of Tories."

Furthermore, on March 27, 1781, the church was the site of a skirmish between local Patriots from the Cumberland County Regiment of Militia under the command of Captain Daniel Buie and British Legion dragoons under the command of Lt.-Col. Banastre Tarleton. The skirmish left one patriot dead, with an unknown number wounded, and was a resounding British victory. The surviving Patriots were taken prisoner and placed aboard prison hulks in Charleston Harbor.

== See also ==
- Barbecue Township
