= Lemon Springs, North Carolina =

- Unincorporated community
- Location within North Carolina Location within the United States
- Coordinates: 35°23′23″N 79°11′40″W
- Country: United States
- State: North Carolina
- County: Lee
- Elevation: 390 ft (120 m)
- Time zone: UTC-5 (Eastern (EST))
  - Summer (DST): UTC-4 (EDT)
- Postal code: 28355
- Area code: 919
- GNIS feature ID: 988346

Lemon Springs is an unincorporated community in southern Lee County, North Carolina, United States. It lies south of Sanford, and southeast of Tramway. The community is centered on The Fastop Convenience store, now known as Eagles when the long-standing Fastop was sold, the business shares a building with the Fastop Grill. The Greenwood Elementary School is the only one in the Lemon Springs community, before there were closer Middle and High schools, Greenwood was for grades K-12. The Lemon Springs area is only approximately one mile across, but features a volunteer fire department, a post office, a Methodist Church, a Baptist Church, an Apostolic Church, a quarry, and a Gas Station.

Upper Little River, a tributary of the Cape Fear River, rises in a pond about 1 mile east of Lemon Springs.
