= Upper Little River (Cape Fear River tributary) =

Stream in North Carolina, USA

Upper Little River Tributary to Cape Fear River
- Location of Upper Little River mouth Upper Little River (Cape Fear River tributary) (the United States)

Location
- Country: United States
- State: North Carolina
- County: Harnett; Lee

Physical characteristics
- Source: Mare Branch divide
  - location: pond about 1 mile east of Lemon Springs, North Carolina
  - coordinates: 35°23′08″N 079°10′06″W
  - elevation: 395 ft (120 m)
- Mouth: Cape Fear River
  - location: about 0.5 miles northwest of Erwin, North Carolina
  - coordinates: 35°19′58″N 078°43′49″W
  - elevation: 75 ft (23 m)
- Length: 50.92 mi (81.95 km)
- Basin size: 214.78 square miles (556.3 km^{2})
- Discharge
  - location: Cape Fear River
  - average: 218.82 cu ft/s (6.196 m^{3}/s) at mouth with Cape Fear River

Basin features
- Progression: Cape Fear River → Atlantic Ocean
- River system: Cape Fear River
- Tributaries
  - left: Little Juniper Creek; Mulatto Branch; Carrs Creek; Patchet Creek; Jones Creek; Rooty Branch; Stony Branch; Reedy Branch; Big Gully; Bear Branch; Juniper Branch; Duncans Creek; Youngs Branch; Mooly Branch; First Silver Run
  - right: Juniper Creek; Barbecue Creek; Deep Branch; Rocky Run Creek; Knights Springs Branch; Horse Pen Branch; McRany Branch; McLean Creek; Smith Branch; Gardners Branch
- Bridges: Kentryewood Farm Road, Sheriff Watson Road, St Andrews Church Road, NC 87, Traceway N, Cox Mill Road, Broadway Road, Rosser Pittman Road, Mount Pisgah Church Road, McDougald Road, NC 27, Norrington Road, NC 210, US 401, Ross Road, Titan Roberts Road

Upper Little River is a 50.92 mi (81.95 km) long 5th order tributary to the Cape Fear River in Harnett County, North Carolina.

== Course ==
Upper Little River rises in a pond about 1 mile east of Lemon Springs, North Carolina in Lee County and then follows an easterly course into Harnett County to join the Cape Fear River about 0.5 miles northwest of Erwin, North Carolina.

== Watershed ==
Upper Little River drains 214.78 square miles (556.3 km^{2}) of area, receives about 46.9 in/year of precipitation, has a wetness index of 426.47 and is about 48% forested.

== See also ==
- List of rivers of North Carolina
