= Ryes, North Carolina =

Unincorporated community in North Carolina, US

Coordinates: 35°25′57″N 79°00′02″W

Ryes is an unincorporated community located along old U.S. Route 421 in the Upper Little River Township of Harnett County, North Carolina, United States, situated between the communities of Seminole and Mamers (Powell 1968, p. 431). It is a part of the Dunn Micropolitan Area, which is also a part of the greater Raleigh–Durham–Cary Combined Statistical Area (CSA) as defined by the United States Census Bureau.

Camels Creek, a tributary of the Cape Fear River, rises just north of Ryes.
