= Christian Light, North Carolina =

- Unincorporated community
- Location within North Carolina Location within the United States
- Country: United States
- State: North Carolina
- County: Harnett
- Elevation: 364 ft (111 m)
- Time zone: UTC-5 (Eastern (EST))
  - Summer (DST): UTC-4 (EDT)
- Area codes: 910, 472, 919

Christian Light is an unincorporated community located in the Hectors Creek Township of Harnett County, North Carolina, United States. It is a part of the Dunn Micropolitan Area, which is also a part of the greater Raleigh–Durham–Cary Combined Statistical Area (CSA) as defined by the United States Census Bureau.

According to the Section L35 of the Harnett County Heritage Book, "Christian Light comprises an area along Christian light Road, Kipling Road and Cokesbury Rd and bounded on the West by Hectors Creek and on the West by Avents Creek. The center of the community being the intersection of Christian Light Road and State Road 1403 (Kipling and Cokesbury Road)".

The community consists of two gas stations, two churches, and a fire department (Northwest Harnett Fire Department).

== History ==
The community of Christion Light was formed during the late 1800s. It consisted of a mill, a schoolhouse, and a general store. The school was known as Lockamy School (later Known as Christian Light School) and the general Ssore was known as May's Store. May's Store operated as a general store and a post office. May's Store is still in existence and functioned as a community gathering spot for many years.
