= Holland, North Carolina =

Unincorporated community in North Carolina, US

Coordinates: 35°34′23″N 78°46′13″W

Holland is an unincorporated community in Wake County, North Carolina, United States, east of Five Points. It lies at an elevation of 410 feet (120 m).

Neills Creek, a tributary to the Cape Fear River, rises in a pond in Holland.
