= Seminole, North Carolina =

Unincorporated community in North Carolina, US

Seminole
- unincorporated community
- Interactive map of Seminole
- Coordinates: 35°26′25″N 79°02′12″W
- Country: United States
- State: North Carolina
- County: Harnett
- Township: Upper Little River
- Time zone: UTC−5 (Eastern (EST))
  - Summer (DST): UTC−4 (EDT)

Seminole is an unincorporated community located along U.S. Route 421 in the Upper Little River Township of Harnett County, North Carolina, United States, near the county line with Lee County just outside the town of Broadway (Powell 1968, p. 445). It is a part of the Dunn Micropolitan Area, which is also a part of the greater Raleigh–Durham–Cary Combined Statistical Area (CSA) as defined by the United States Census Bureau.

Daniels Creek, a tributary to the Cape Fear River, rises just north of Seminole.
