= Lillington Township, Harnett County, North Carolina =

Township in Harnett County, North Carolina, U.S.

Coordinates: 35°20′49″N 78°47′33″W

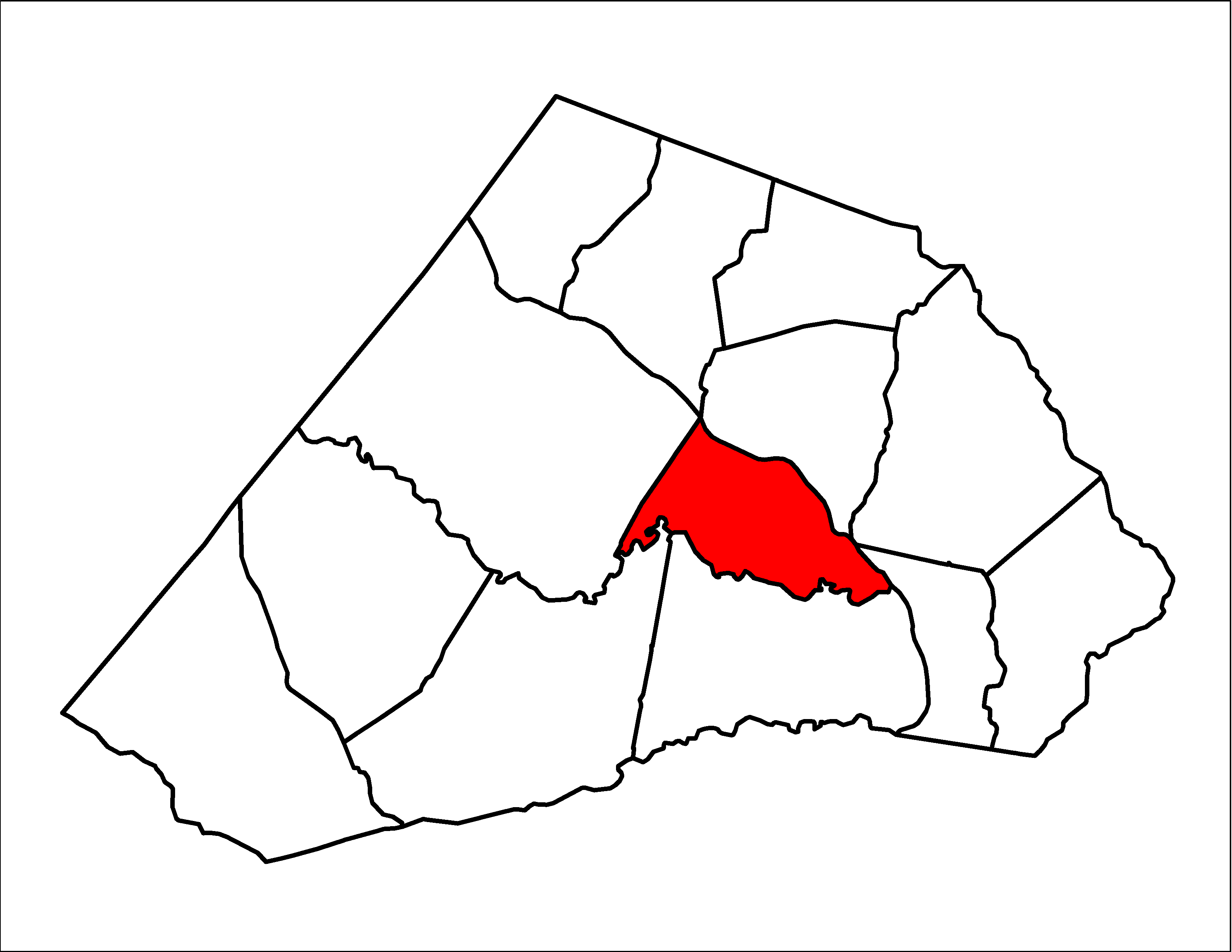
Location of Lillington Township in Harnett County, N.C.

Lillington Township is one of 13 townships in Harnett County, North Carolina, United States. The township had a population of 4,573 according to the 2000 census. It is a part of the Dunn micropolitan area, which is also a part of the greater Raleigh–Durham–Cary combined statistical area as defined by the United States Census Bureau.

Geographically, Lillington Township occupies 28.76 square miles (74.5 km^{2}) in central Harnett County. The only incorporated municipality within Lillington Township is the Town of Lillington, the county seat of Harnett County. Several other unincorporated communities, though, are located in Lillington Township, including Harnett and Shawtown.
