= Raven Rock State Park =

State park in North Carolina, United States

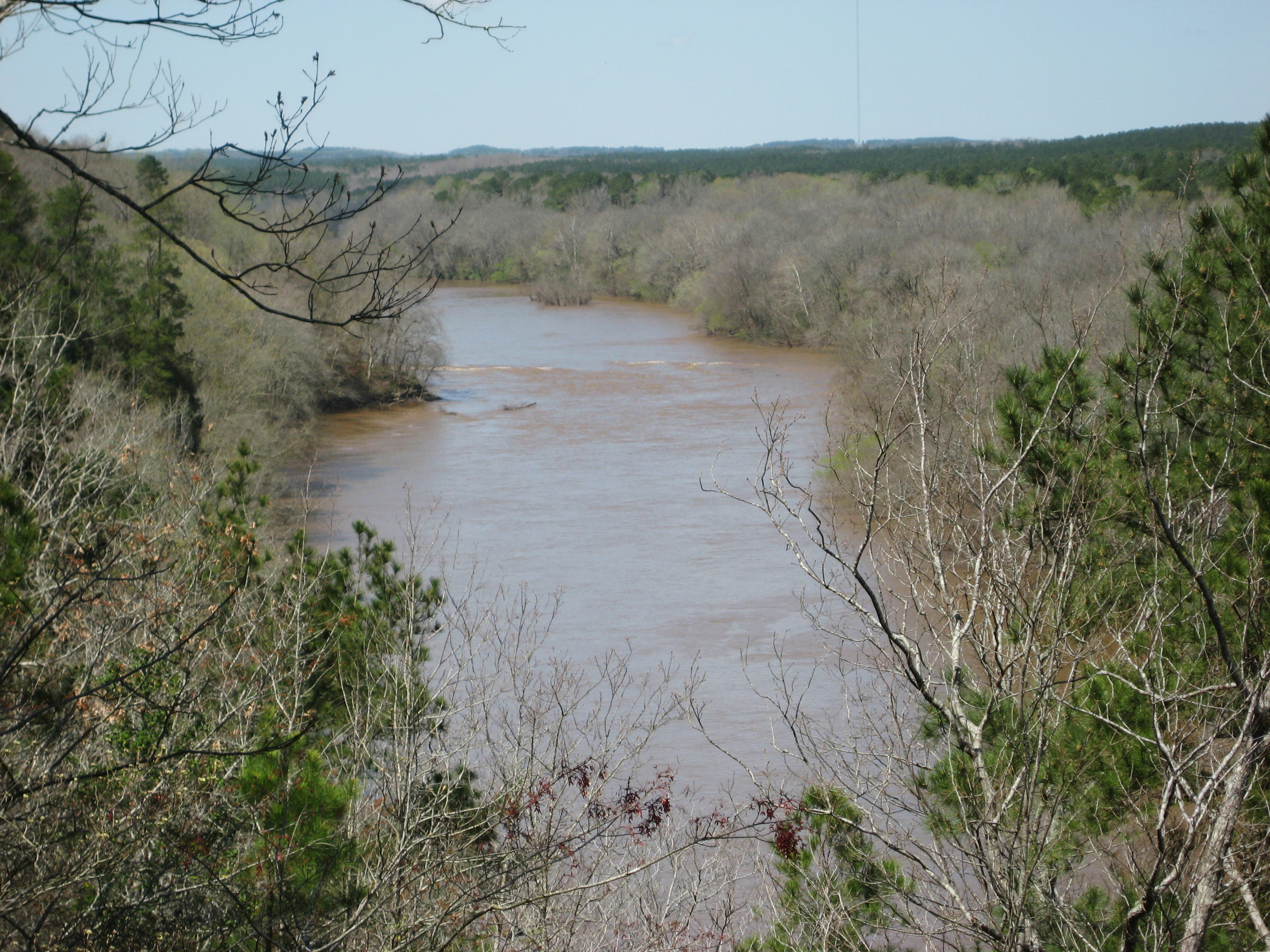
- The Cape Fear River as seen from Raven Rock State Park

- Location within North Carolina Location within the United States
- Interactive map of Raven Rock State Park
- Location: Harnett County, North Carolina, United States
- Coordinates: 35°27′35″N 78°54′46″W
- Area: 4,810 acres (1,950 ha)
- Elevation: 131 ft (40 m)
- Established: 1969
- Administrator: North Carolina Division of Parks and Recreation
- Website: Official website

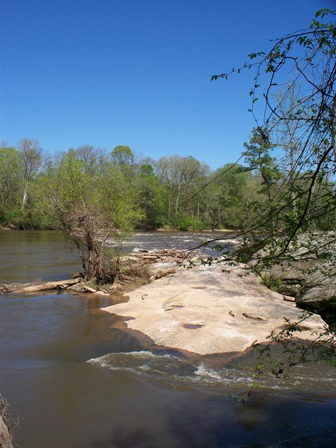
Lanier Falls

Raven Rock State Park is a North Carolina state park in Harnett County, North Carolina in the United States. Located near Lillington, North Carolina, it covers 4,810 acres (19.5 km^{2}) along the banks of the Cape Fear River. Raven Rock State Park is located on the eastern edge of the Piedmont.

== History ==
Raven Rock State Park sits along the fall line, an area where the hard, resistant rocks of the foothills give way to the softer rocks and sediments of the coastal plain. The underlying rocks of the area were formed more than 400 million years ago by intense heat and pressure.

Through the ages, flowing waters and swirling winds gradually eroded the land, carving and sculpting Raven Rock. This immense crystalline structure rises to 150 feet (46 m) and stretches for more than a mile along the Cape Fear River. The rock was originally called Patterson's Rock for an early settler who found refuge there when his canoe capsized nearby. In 1854, its name was changed to Raven Rock, inspired by the sight of ravens that formerly roosted on rock ledges.

The Sissipahaw, Keyauwee, Eno, Shakori and Tuscarora Indians hunted the area until European settlers arrived in the mid-18th century. The first settlers were primarily hunters and trappers who were searching for high country similar to their native country, Scotland. Later, stores, mills and quarries were built. Many of the woodlands were farmed, and as the forests returned, much of the land was harvested for timber.

A road that stretched from Raleigh to Fayetteville crossed the Cape Fear River via the Northington Ferry and served as the area's major transportation route. Locks and dams were built along the river to facilitate navigation by boat, and Raven Rock became an important landmark for river pilots. After a hurricane destroyed the locks and dams in 1859, the structures were not replaced; railroad transportation eliminated the need for river travel. As new roads were built, the ferry was closed and Raven Rock became a popular recreation spot. The remnants of the Northington lock and dam can still be seen in the park.

In 1965, interest grew in preserving the area as a state park, and local citizens organized support for the project. In 1969, a bill establishing the park was passed in the General Assembly. More than 220 acres (0.89 km^{2}) of land were purchased and another 170 acres (0.69 km^{2}) were donated by Burlington Industries. Additional tracts have since been purchased, bringing the park to its present size of 4,667 acres (18.89 km^{2}). In March 2025, the state purchased an additional 273 acres off River Road for $6.15 million to expand the park.

== Information ==
The park offers a picnic area, places for fishing and canoeing, and camp grounds. There are also several hiking trails, including the American Beech Trail (0.5 miles), Campbell Creek Loop (5.0 miles), Fish Traps Trail (0.6 miles), Lanier Falls Trail (0.2 miles), Little Creek Loop (1.5 miles), Northington Ferry Trail (0.9 miles), and the Raven Rock Loop (2.6 miles). There are also horseback riding trails on the north side of the Cape Fear River.

The Raven Rock Loop splits off in two directions. One leads to the Raven Rock, a 150-foot (46 m) high and one mile (1.6 km) long rock formation along the river. The other leads to the Overlook, a small manmade stone structure high above the Cape Fear River, giving a clear view of both the river and the undeveloped woodlands.
