= Anderson Creek, North Carolina =

Census-designated place in North Carolina, US

- Census-designated place
- Location within North Carolina Location within the United States
- Coordinates: 35°15′56″N 78°57′29″W
- Country: United States
- State: North Carolina
- County: Harnett

Area
  - Total: 19.56 sq mi (50.65 km^{2})
  - Land: 19.50 sq mi (50.50 km^{2})
  - Water: 0.058 sq mi (0.15 km^{2})
- Elevation: 272 ft (83 m)

Population (2020)
  - Total: 13,636
  - Density: 699.4/sq mi (270.03/km^{2})
- Time zone: UTC-5 (Eastern (EST))
  - Summer (DST): UTC-4 (EDT)
- Area codes: 910, 472
- GNIS feature ID: 2805281

Anderson Creek is a census-designated place located in the Anderson Creek Township of Harnett County, North Carolina. It was first listed as a CDP in the 2020 census with a population of 13,636. It is the largest community in Harnett County.

It is a part of the Anderson Creek, NC Micropolitan Statistical Area, which is also included in the Raleigh-Durham-Cary, NC Combined Statistical Area.

Anderson Creek is located approximately 7 miles (11 km) to the north Of Spring Lake, Pope Air Force Base and Fort Bragg.

Current talks are in place on incorporating Anderson Creek as a town, which would entail a post office being opened in the community. Currently, most Anderson Creek residents have Spring Lake addresses with the zip code 28390. Anderson Creek is served by the Harnett County Sheriff's department for law enforcement and Anderson Creek Emergency Services for fire and emergency services.

Anderson Creek is a fast-growing community. Increased rapid growth of the community can be attributed to the increase of the military at the nearby Fort Bragg, as well as the Davis Love III-created golf course, Anderson Creek Club.

== Demographics ==
Historical population
Census	Pop.	Note	%±
2020	13,636		—
U.S. Decennial Census; 2020

=== 2020 census ===
As of the 2020 census, Anderson Creek had a population of 13,636. The median age was 31.8 years. 31.4% of residents were under the age of 18 and 7.6% of residents were 65 years of age or older. For every 100 females there were 96.7 males, and for every 100 females age 18 and over there were 92.2 males age 18 and over.

48.6% of residents lived in urban areas, while 51.4% lived in rural areas.

There were 4,749 households in Anderson Creek, of which 44.7% had children under the age of 18 living in them. Of all households, 55.0% were married-couple households, 15.9% were households with a male householder and no spouse or partner present, and 23.5% were households with a female householder and no spouse or partner present. About 20.4% of all households were made up of individuals and 5.0% had someone living alone who was 65 years of age or older.

There were 5,175 housing units, of which 8.2% were vacant. The homeowner vacancy rate was 4.2% and the rental vacancy rate was 6.5%.

Anderson Creek CDP, North Carolina – Demographic Profile (NH = Non-Hispanic)
Race / Ethnicity	Pop 2020	% 2020
White alone (NH)	6,820	50.01%
Black or African American alone (NH)	3,577	26.23%
Native American or Alaska Native alone (NH)	132	0.97%
Asian alone (NH)	251	1.84%
Pacific Islander alone (NH)	44	0.32%
Some Other Race alone (NH)	111	0.81%
Mixed Race/Multi-Racial (NH)	924	6.78%
Hispanic or Latino (any race)	1.777	13.03%
Total	13,636	100.00%

Note: the US Census treats Hispanic/Latino as an ethnic category. This table excludes Latinos from the racial categories and assigns them to a separate category. Hispanics/Latinos can be of any race.

== Anderson Creek Club ==
Anderson Creek Club is a residential golf course community in the United States, located in the unincorporated community of Anderson Creek, North of Fayetteville, North Carolina.

Anderson Creek Club is a luxury gated community featuring a course and a charter school. The golf course was designed by Davis Love III. When it opened in 2001, it was acclaimed as the "best new course in North Carolina", and was awarded 4 1/2 Stars by Golf Digest.

== Schools ==
- South Harnett Elementary
- Anderson Creek Primary
- Overhills High
- Overhills Middle
- Overhills Elementary
