= Cokesbury, North Carolina =

- Unincorporated community
- Location within North Carolina Location within the United States
- Coordinates: 35°31′29″N 78°54′32″W
- Country: United States
- State: North Carolina
- County: Harnett
- Elevation: 404 ft (123 m)
- Time zone: UTC-5 (Eastern (EST))
  - Summer (DST): UTC-4 (EDT)
- Area codes: 910, 472, 919
- GNIS feature ID: 983346

Cokesbury is an unincorporated community located in the Buckhorn Township of Harnett County, North Carolina, United States. It is a part of the Dunn Micropolitan Area, which is also a part of the greater Raleigh–Durham–Cary Combined Statistical Area (CSA) as defined by the United States Census Bureau.

The community was named for Methodist bishops Thomas Coke and Francis Asbury. The Buckhorn Iron Furnace, a former landmark near here, operated during the Civil War until 1873.(Powell 1968, p. 112)

== History ==
According to 19th and early 20th century maps, Cokesbury was originally known as Chalk Level. In 1889, Chalk Level had a population of 65. There were two churches, Cokesbury Methodist and Cumberland Union Baptist, and two ministers, but both of them were Methodist. Three physicians lived in Chalk Level, but no lawyers. Chalk Level had three blacksmiths, one cooper and six other businesses, including three general stores, a fertilizer store, a lumber seller and an auctioneer. Other nearby businesses included the Buckhorn Coal Mine, the Cape Fear Steel and Iron Mine, two flour mills and one woolen mill.

Chalk Level had one school, the Cokesbury Academy, and one teacher, J.A. Cameron.(Branson 1890, pp. 349–52)

The earliest map to show the change from Chalk Level to Cokesbury is a 1916 Harnett County soil map produced by the North Carolina Department of Agriculture.
