= Buies Creek =

Stream in North Carolina, USA

Buies Creek Tributary to Cape Fear River
- Location of Buies Creek Creek mouth Buies Creek (the United States)

Location
- Country: United States
- State: North Carolina
- County: Harnett
- City: Buies Creek

Physical characteristics
- Source: Black River divide
  - location: about 1.5 miles southeast of Angier, North Carolina
  - coordinates: 35°28′37″N 078°42′47″W
  - elevation: 302 ft (92 m)
- Mouth: Cape Fear River
  - location: about 1 mile southwest of Buies Creek, North Carolina
  - coordinates: 35°23′00″N 078°45′13″W
  - elevation: 98 ft (30 m)
- Length: 7.31 mi (11.76 km)
- Basin size: 27.91 square miles (72.3 km^{2})
- Discharge
  - location: Cape Fear River
  - average: 28.68 cu ft/s (0.812 m^{3}/s) at mouth with Cape Fear River

Basin features
- Progression: Cape Fear River → Atlantic Ocean
- River system: Cape Fear River
- Tributaries
  - left: East Buies Creek
  - right: West Buies Creek
- Bridges: NC 55, Butts Road, Sheriff Johnson Road, US 421-NC 27

Buies Creek is a 7.31 mi (11.76 km) long 3rd order tributary to the Cape Fear River in Harnett County, North Carolina, United States.

== Course ==
Buies Creek rises about 1.5 miles southeast of Angier and then flows south to join the Cape Fear River about 1 mile southwest of Buies Creek.

== Watershed ==
Buies Creek drains 27.91 square miles (72.3 km^{2}) of area, receives about 46.7 in/year of precipitation, has a wetness index of 492.65 and is about 22% forested.

== See also ==
- List of rivers of North Carolina
