= Bunnlevel, North Carolina =

- Census-designated place
- Location within North Carolina Location within the United States
- Coordinates: 35°18′36″N 78°46′21″W
- Country: United States
- State: North Carolina
- County: Harnett

Area
  - Total: 7.59 sq mi (19.66 km^{2})
  - Land: 7.56 sq mi (19.58 km^{2})
  - Water: 0.035 sq mi (0.09 km^{2})
- Elevation: 138 ft (42 m)

Population (2020)
  - Total: 516
  - Density: 68.3/sq mi (26.36/km^{2})
- Time zone: UTC-5 (Eastern (EST))
  - Summer (DST): UTC-4 (EDT)
- ZIP code: 28323
- Area codes: 910, 472
- FIPS code: 37-08880
- GNIS feature ID: 2584311

Bunnlevel is an unincorporated community and census-designated place (CDP) along U.S. Highway 401 in Stewarts Creek Township, Harnett County, North Carolina, United States. As of the 2020 census, Bunnlevel had a population of 516. It is a part of the Dunn Micropolitan Area, which is also a part of the greater Raleigh–Durham–Cary Combined Statistical Area (CSA) as defined by the United States Census Bureau.

== History ==
Bunnlevel was originally named "Bunn's Level" after a local resident Joseph Bunn who established the first Post Office April 6, 1846. The community was later incorporated in 1921 as "Bunnlevel" but has since been inactive as a municipality. Another incorporation movement here failed in 1961. Early prominent families included Elliott, McDougald, McNeill, McLean, Walker, Spears, Buie, Bunn, Byrd, Chance, Thomas, Hobbs and Hicks.

Thorbiskope was listed on the National Register of Historic Places in 1986.

== Geography ==
The community is in southern Harnett County along U.S. Route 401, 7 miles (11 km) south of Lillington, the county seat, and 20 miles (32 km) north of Fayetteville. According to the United States Census Bureau, the Bunnlevel CDP has a total area of 7.59 square miles (19.66 km^{2}), of which 7.56 square miles (19.58 km^{2}) are land and 0.03 square miles (0.09 km^{2}), or 0.44%, are water.

== Demographics ==
Historical population
Census	Pop.	Note	%±
2020	516		—
U.S. Decennial Census
