= Cape Fear River =

River in North Carolina, United States

Cape Fear River Tributary to Atlantic Ocean
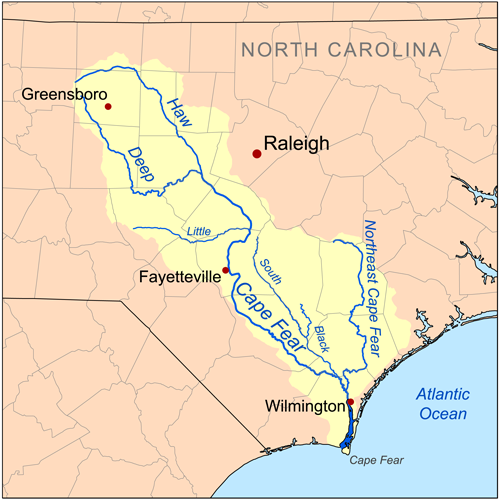
- Map of the Cape Fear River drainage basin

Location
- Country: United States
- State: North Carolina
- County: Bladen; Brunswick; Chatham; Columbus; Cumberland; Harnett; Lee; New Hanover; Pender
- City: Lillington; Erwin; Fayetteville; Elizabethtown; Wilmington; Southport

Physical characteristics
- Source: confluence of Deep River and Haw River
  - location: about 1 mile southeast of Moncure, North Carolina
  - coordinates: 35°35′48″N 079°03′07″W
  - elevation: 154 ft (47 m)
- Mouth: Atlantic Ocean
  - location: between Oak Island and Bald Head Island
  - coordinates: 33°53′08″N 078°00′46″W
  - elevation: 0 ft (0 m)
- Length: 191.08 mi (307.51 km)
- Basin size: 9,120.61 mi^{2} (23,622.3 km^{2})
- Discharge
  - location: Atlantic Ocean
  - average: 9,959.87 cu ft/s (282.032 m^{3}/s) at mouth with Atlantic Ocean

Basin features
- Progression: generally southeast
- River system: Cape Fear River
- Tributaries
  - left: Gulf Creek, Buckhorn Creek, Parkers Creek, Avents Creek, Hector Creek, Neills Creek, Dry Creek, Buies Creek, Thorntons Creek, Juniper Creek, Cedar Creek, Phillips Creek, Harrison Creek, Ellis Creek, Turnbull Creek, Mulford Creek, Bandeau Creek, Frenchs Creek, Black River, Northeast Cape Fear River, Barnards Creek, Mott Creek, Telfairs Creek
  - right: Wombles Creek, Little Shaddox Creek, Lick Creek, Bush Creek, Fall Creek, Daniels Creek, Cedar Creek, Camels Creek, Little Creek, Fish Creek, Poorhouse Creek, Upper Little River, Little River, Carvers Creek, Cross Creek, Rockfish Creek, Grays Creek, Willis Creek, Georgia Branch, Hucklebrry Swamp, Black Swamp, Bakers Creek, Browns Creek, Pemberton Creek, Hammonds Creek, Drunken Run, Donoho Creek, Carvers Creek, Plummers Run, Steep Run, Weyman Creek, Double Branch, Livingston Creek, Bryant Mill Creek, Grist Mill Branch, Bay Branch, Indian Creek, Cartwheel Branch, Alligator Creek, Brunswick River, Mallory Creek, Little Mallory Creek, Town Creek, Sand Hill Creek, Liliput Creek, Orton Creek, Walden Creek, Price Creek
- Bridges: Avents Ferry Road, US 401-NC 210, NC 217, I-295, I-95, NC 24-210, I-95, Tarheel Ferry Road, US 701, General Howe Highway (NC 11), US 17-74, US 17

The Cape Fear River is a 191.08-mile-long (307.51-kilometer) blackwater river in eastern North Carolina. It flows into the Atlantic Ocean near Cape Fear, from which it takes its name. The river is formed at the confluence of the Haw River and the Deep River in the town of Moncure, North Carolina. Its river basin is the largest in the state: 9,149 sq mi.

The river is the most industrialized river in North Carolina, lined with power plants, manufacturing plants, wastewater treatment plants, landfills, paper mills, and industrial agriculture. Relatedly, the river is polluted by various substances, including suspended solids and manmade chemicals. These chemicals include per- and polyfluoroalkyl substances (PFAS), GenX, perfluorooctanesulfonic acid, perfluorooctanoic acid, byproducts of production of the fluoropolymer Nafion; and intermediates used to make other fluoropolymers (e.g. PPVE, PEVE and PMVE perfluoroether). Industrial chemicals such as 1,4-Dioxane and other pollutants have been found in its tributary, the Haw River.

In 2020, a national study of tap water found the highest concentration of PFAS in Brunswick County, which gets its drinking water from the Cape Fear River.

== Variant names ==
According to the Geographic Names Information System, the Cape Fear River has also been known historically as:

- Cape Fair River
- Cape-Feare River
- Charle River
- Charles River
- Clarendon River
- North East Cape Fear River
- North West Branch
- Rio Jorda

== Course ==
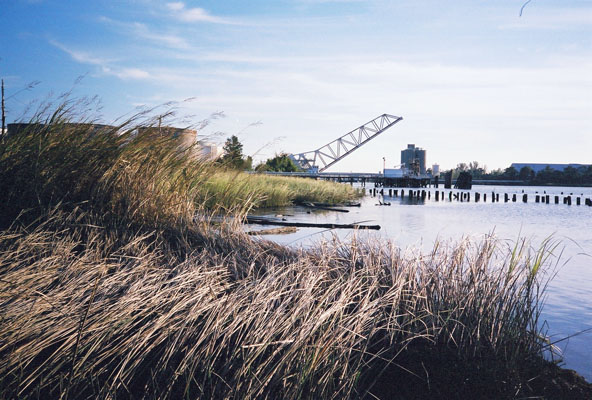
The Cape Fear River at Smith Creek in Wilmington, North Carolina

It is formed at Haywood, near the county line between Lee and Chatham Counties, by the confluence of the Deep and Haw Rivers just below Jordan Lake. It flows southeast past Lillington, Fayetteville, and Elizabethtown, then receives the Black River about 10 miles (16 km) northwest of Wilmington. At Wilmington, it receives the Northeast Cape Fear River and Brunswick River, turns south, widening as an estuary and entering the Atlantic about 3 miles (4.8 km) west of Cape Fear.

During the colonial era, the river provided a principal transportation route to the interior of North Carolina. Today the river is navigable as far as Fayetteville through a series of locks and dams. The estuary of the river furnishes a segment of the route of the Intracoastal Waterway.

The East Coast Greenway runs along the river.

== Bridges ==
- Cape Fear Memorial Bridge (US 17/US 76/US 421)
- S. Thomas Rhodes Bridge (US 421/NC 133/US 74)
- Trooper Harry T. Long Bridge
- L. Bobby Brown Bridge (I-140)
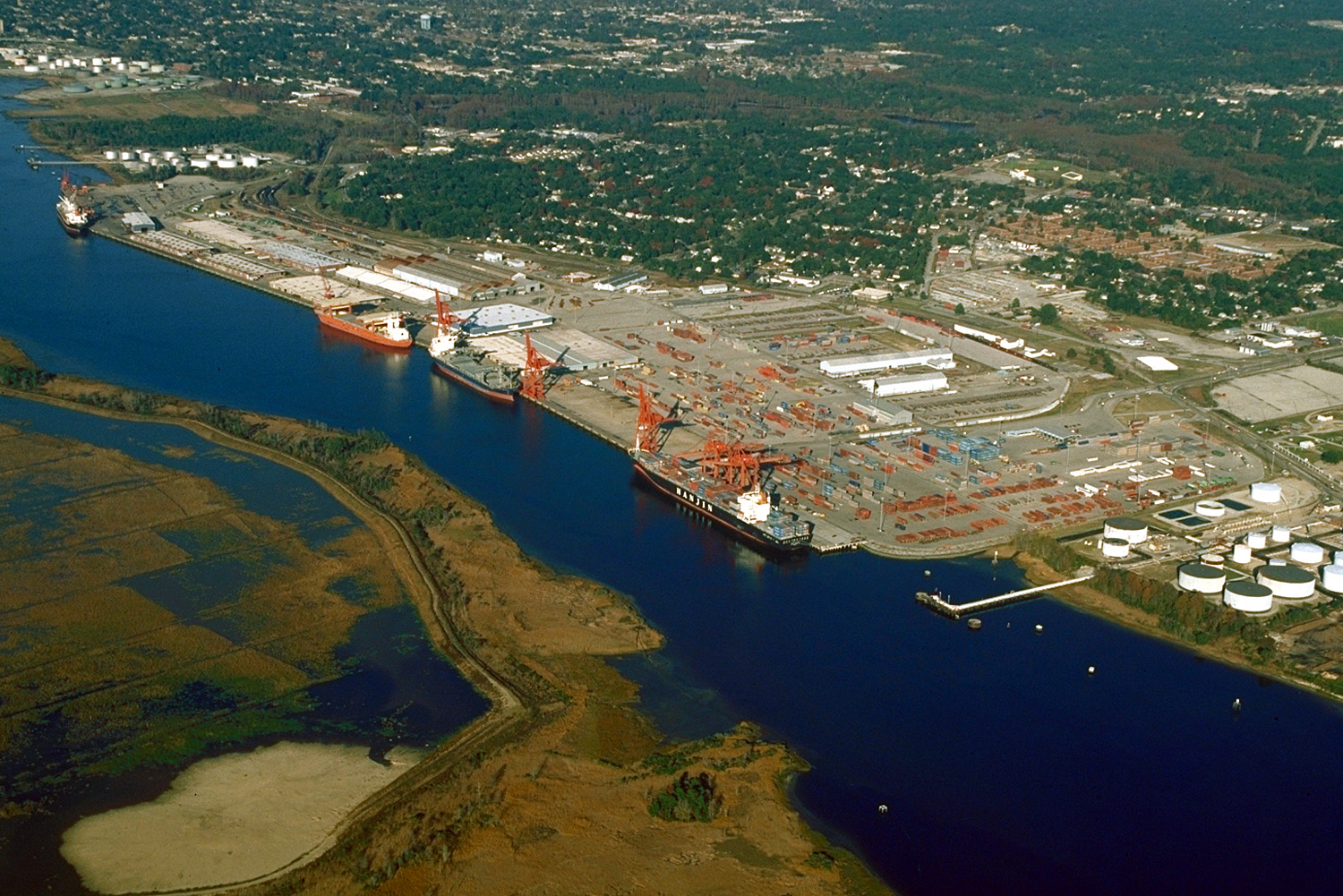
The port in Wilmington on the Cape Fear River estuary

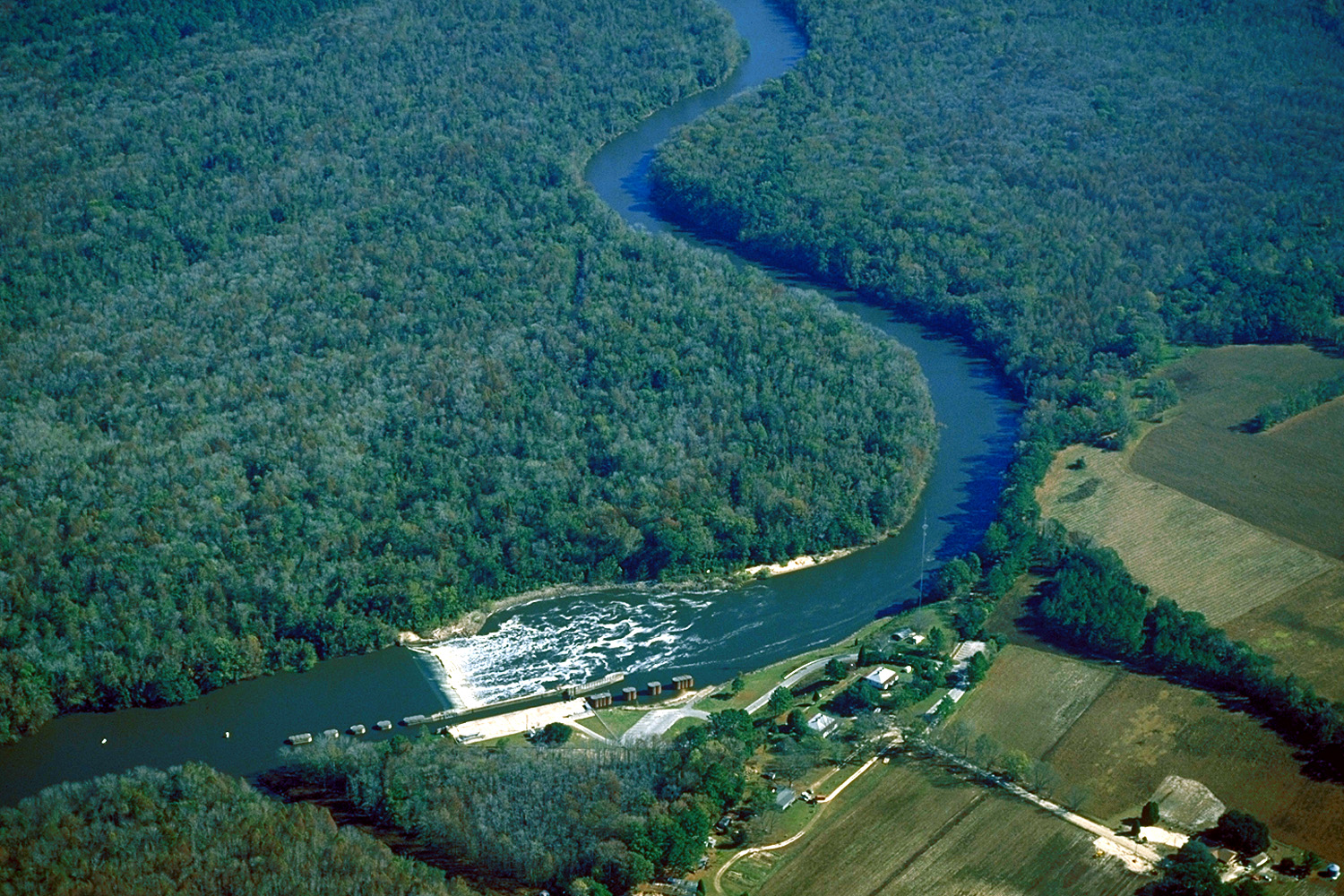
Lock and Dam No. 1 on the Cape Fear River in Bladen County

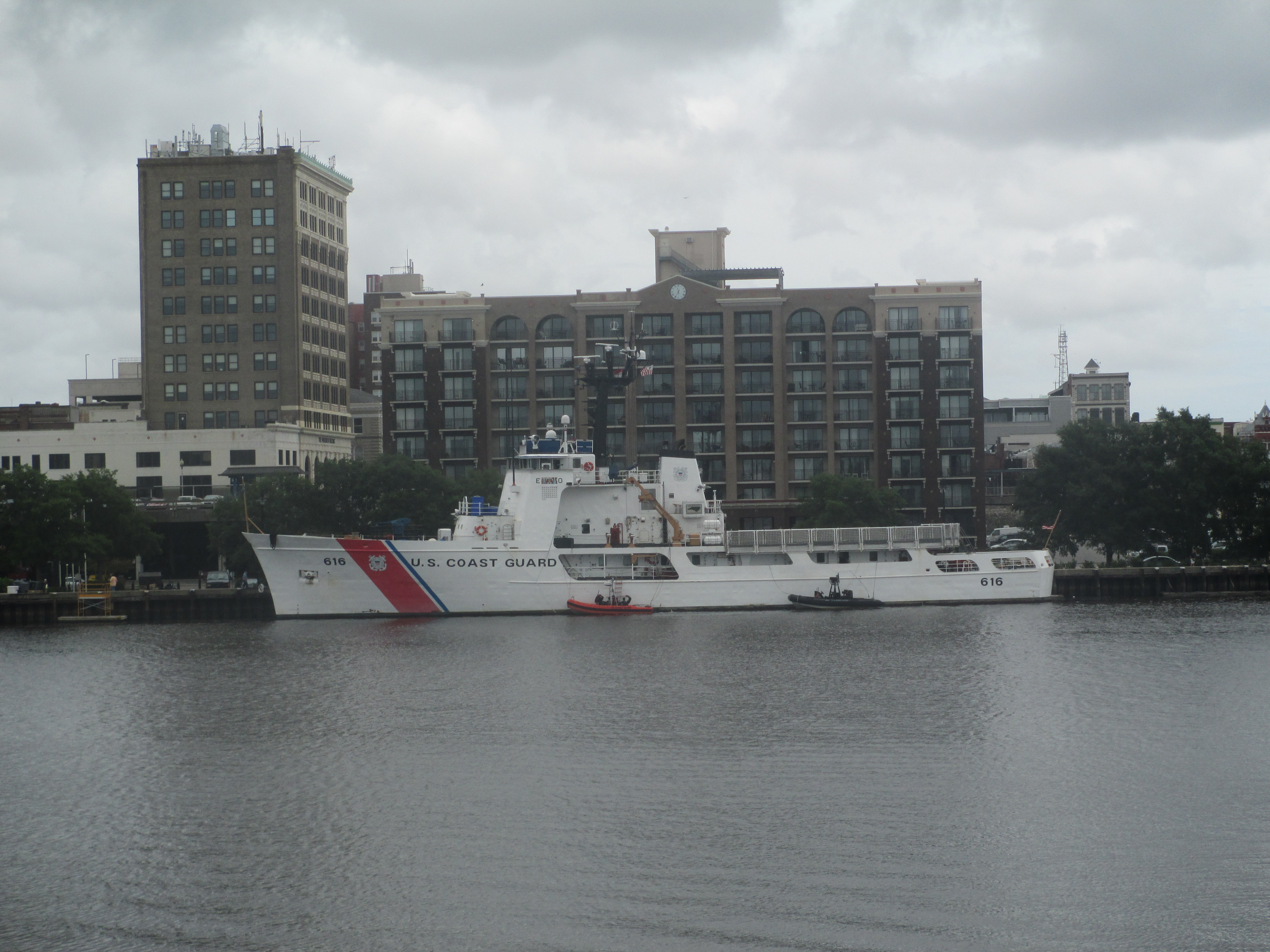
U.S. Coast Guard vessel on the Cape Fear, photographed from the USS North Carolina

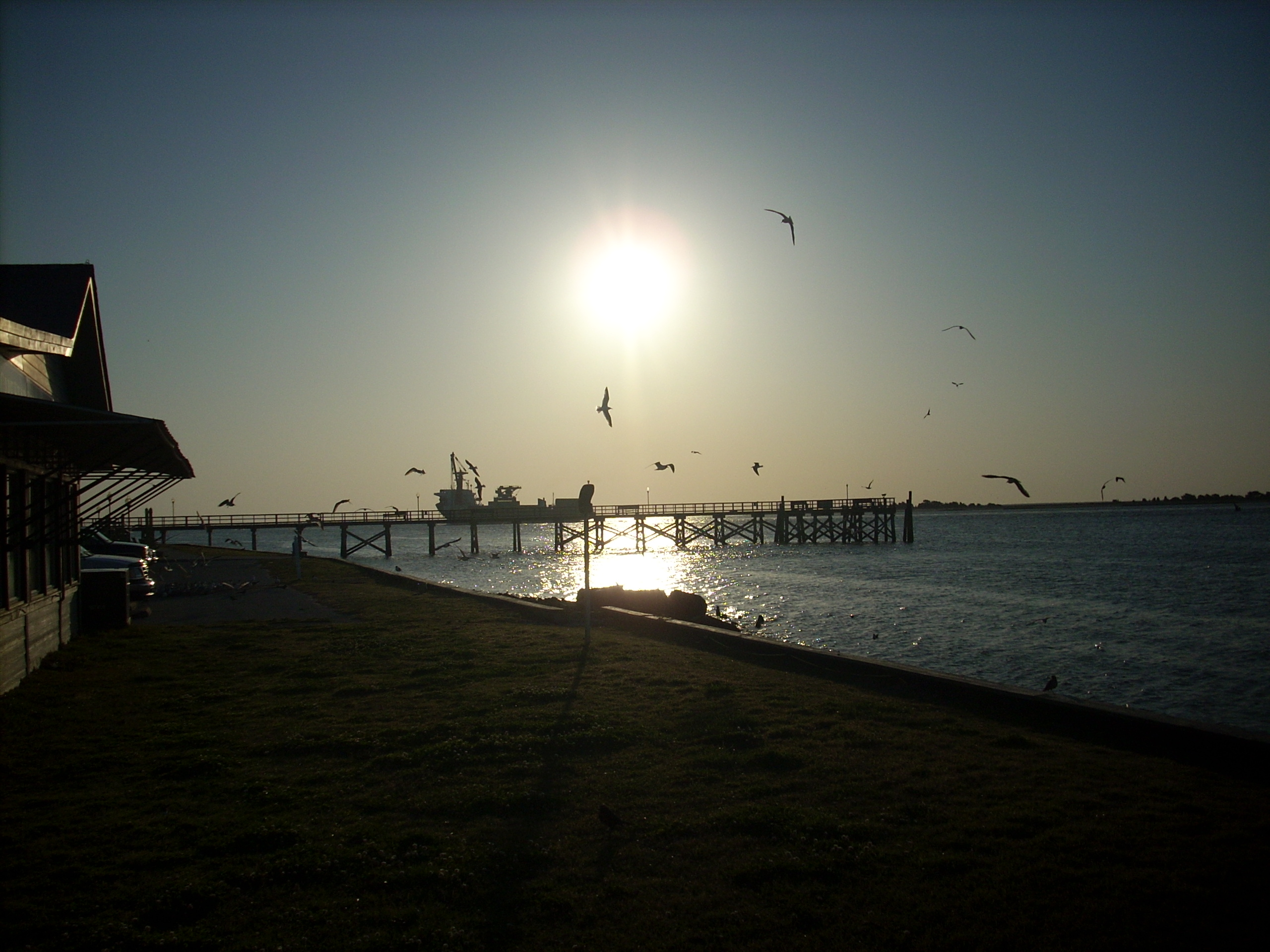
A cargo ship navigating the mouth of the Cape Fear River at Southport

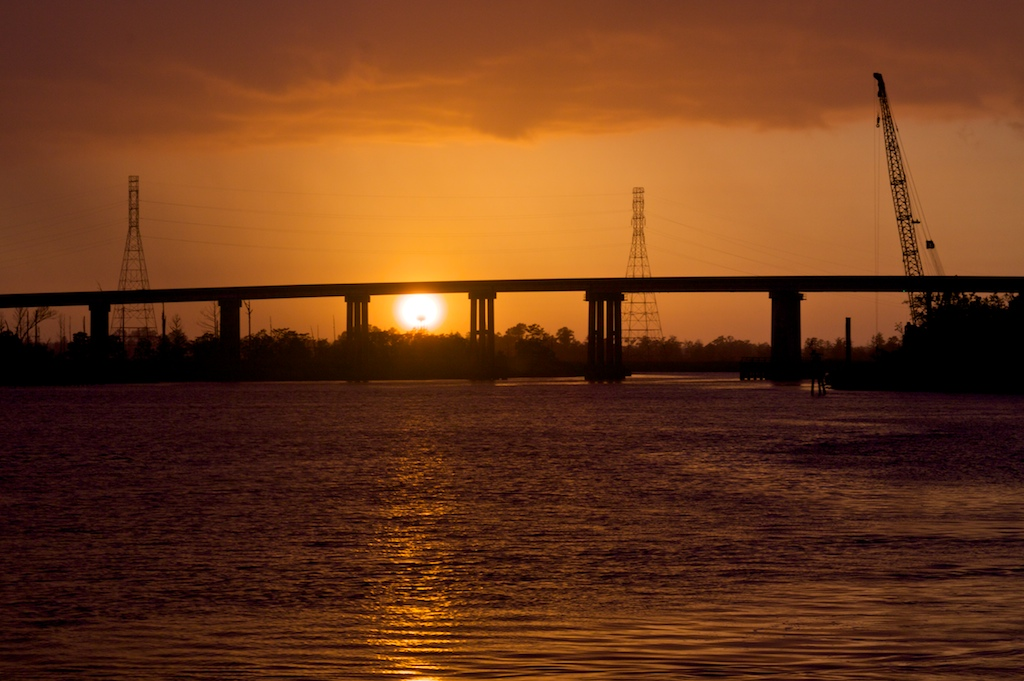
Sunset over the Cape Fear River flowing under the S. Thomas Rhodes Bridge.

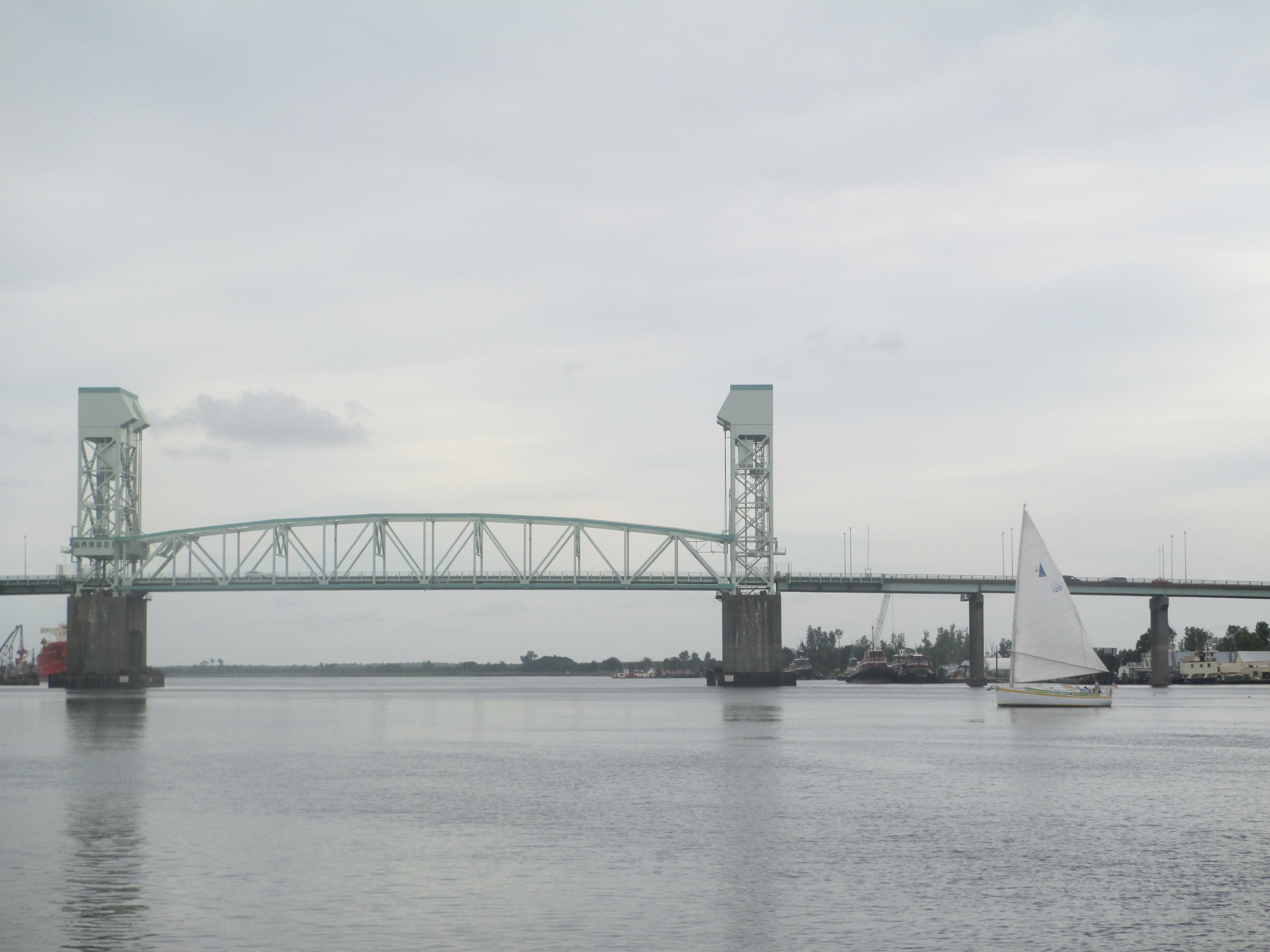
Cape Fear Memorial Bridge in Wilmington is the highest in North Carolina

== Pollution ==
The Cape Fear River is polluted by industry, cities, and farmland in its drainage basin. The pollution comes from both point source and nonpoint sources, including farms, city runoff, and erosion of the river's banks, which contribute pollution such as harmful chemicals and fertilizers, and larger sediments like suspended solids. Pollutants include coal ash. As with any river, the water quality varies in different regions, depending on abiotic and biotic factors.

In 2020, a study found that striped bass in the river have the highest rates of PFAS documented in North American fish. A 2018 study found that bass from the river had 40 times the amount of PFAS in their blood than did bass raised in an aquaculture facility.

In 2020, studies by the North Carolina Department of Environmental Quality found "staggering" concentrations of forever chemicals begin dumped into the Deep River, a major tributary to the Cape Fear River. One sample contained PFOS at 1 part per billion, "more than 14 times greater than the U.S. Environmental Protection Agency's health advisory of 70 parts per trillion for drinking water", North Carolina Heath News reported.

In 2020, a national study of tap water found the highest concentration of PFAS in Brunswick County, which gets its drinking water from the Cape Fear River.

In July 2023, the North Carolina Department of Health and Human Services issued a fish consumption advisory for certain freshwater fish species from the middle and lower Cape Fear River due to contamination with perfluorooctane sulfonic acid (PFOS).

=== Suspended solids ===
Suspended solids refers to any particle (living or nonliving) discharged into an aquatic system that remains in suspension. These particles can find their way into rivers via nonpoint-source pollution or through larger point-source pollution events such as Hurricane Florence in 2018. The storm caused a dam to fail, which caused a mass leakage of coal ash into the Cape Fear River about 5 miles northwest of Wilmington, North Carolina.

=== GenX chemicals ===
GenX is a chemical in the group of manmade per- and polyfluoroalkyl substances, or PFAS used for nonstick, water- and stain-repellent items. GenX is a replacement PFAS, since older and more toxic PFAs are being phased out. GenX is made at the Chemours plant in Fayetteville, NC and has gotten into the Cape Fear River from the plant's wastewater. Like other PFAS, GenX does not easily break down and can accumulate in the environment. Because of this quality, GenX can cause problems for both people and wildlife.

Chemours' wastewater put into the Cape Fear River poses a drinking-water issue for residents of the Fayetteville area and people further down the river. Several groundwater wells in Fayetteville had detections of GenX. At the mouth of the river, the city of Wilmington uses the Cape Fear as a drinking-water source. Blood samples of a group of Wilmington residents showed detections of GenX.

In several studies, GenX has been shown to affect wildlife. PFAS were detected in striped bass caught from the Cape Fear, and the chemical affected the liver and immune system. In plants, GenX reduced the biomass and bioaccumulated in the organism. This bioaccumulation did differ between species.

In a study done to test the ability of retention and how could the GenX chemical be transported in porous materials, results showed that for different forms of the GenX chemical the absorption rate was higher. This research is important to help future researchers understand the tendencies of this chemical. Contaminated sites should be inspected from the water to the soil due to the ability of GenX to travel/transport through porous material such as soil.

The lack of information on the GenX chemical in North Carolina has led to the gap of knowledge about ways in which people may be exposed to these chemicals other than drinking water. Information is also limited on the health effects caused by the GenX chemical, little experiments on animals show liver damage, pancreas damage, etc. There are no federal guidelines regarding the GenX chemical. However, the North Carolina Department of Health and Human Services has set a "health goal", a non-regulated, and non-enforceable low contamination level where no side effects, over time, would be expected.

Little is known about the effectiveness of GenX and PFEA removal from contaminated waters using methods such as ozonation and bio-filtration. Carbon in various forms can be used to treat water that has been contaminated. Experiments done with this technique showed that shorter PFAS did not absorb.

== See also ==
- List of rivers of North Carolina
- USS North Carolina
- Cape Fear Museum
- South Atlantic-Gulf Water Resource Region

== Sources and external links ==
- Cape Fear River discharge data
- U.S. Geological Survey Geographic Names Information System: Cape Fear River
