= Anderson Creek Township, Harnett County, North Carolina =

Anderson Creek Township
- Township
- Location in North Carolina Anderson Creek Township (the United States)
- Coordinates: 35°16′30″N 78°56′11″W
- Country: United States
- State: North Carolina
- County: Harnett

Area
  - Total: 66.78 sq mi (173.0 km^{2})
  - Land: 66.33 sq mi (171.8 km^{2})
  - Water: .45 sq mi (1.2 km^{2})
- As of 2010
- Elevation: 236 ft (72 m)

Population (2010)
  - Total: 14,060
  - Density: 212.0/sq mi (81.84/km^{2})
- Time zone: UTC-5 (Eastern (EST))
  - Summer (DST): UTC-4 (EDT)

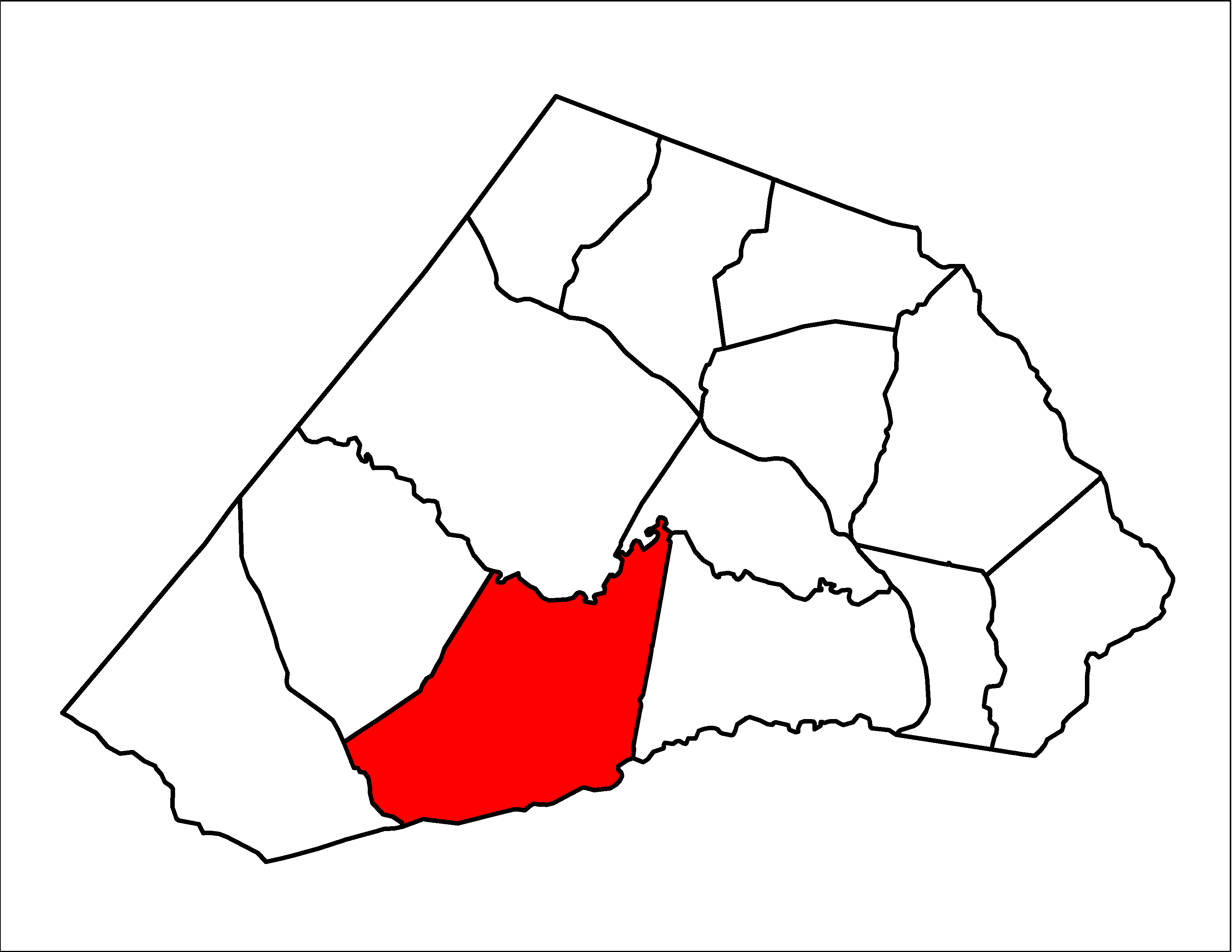
Location of Anderson Creek Township in Harnett County, N.C.

Anderson Creek Township is one of thirteen townships in Harnett County, North Carolina, United States. The township had a population of 11,216 according to the 2000 census, a population of 23,130 according to the 2020 census, & 23,116 according to the 2021 census. It is a part of the Dunn Micropolitan Area, which is also a part of the greater Raleigh–Durham–Cary Combined Statistical Area (CSA) as defined by the United States Census Bureau.

Geographically, Anderson Creek Township occupies 66.85 square miles (173.1 km^{2}) in southern Harnett County. There are no incorporated municipalities located in Anderson Creek Township, however, there are several unincorporated communities located here, including the community of Anderson Creek.
