= Coats, North Carolina =

- Town
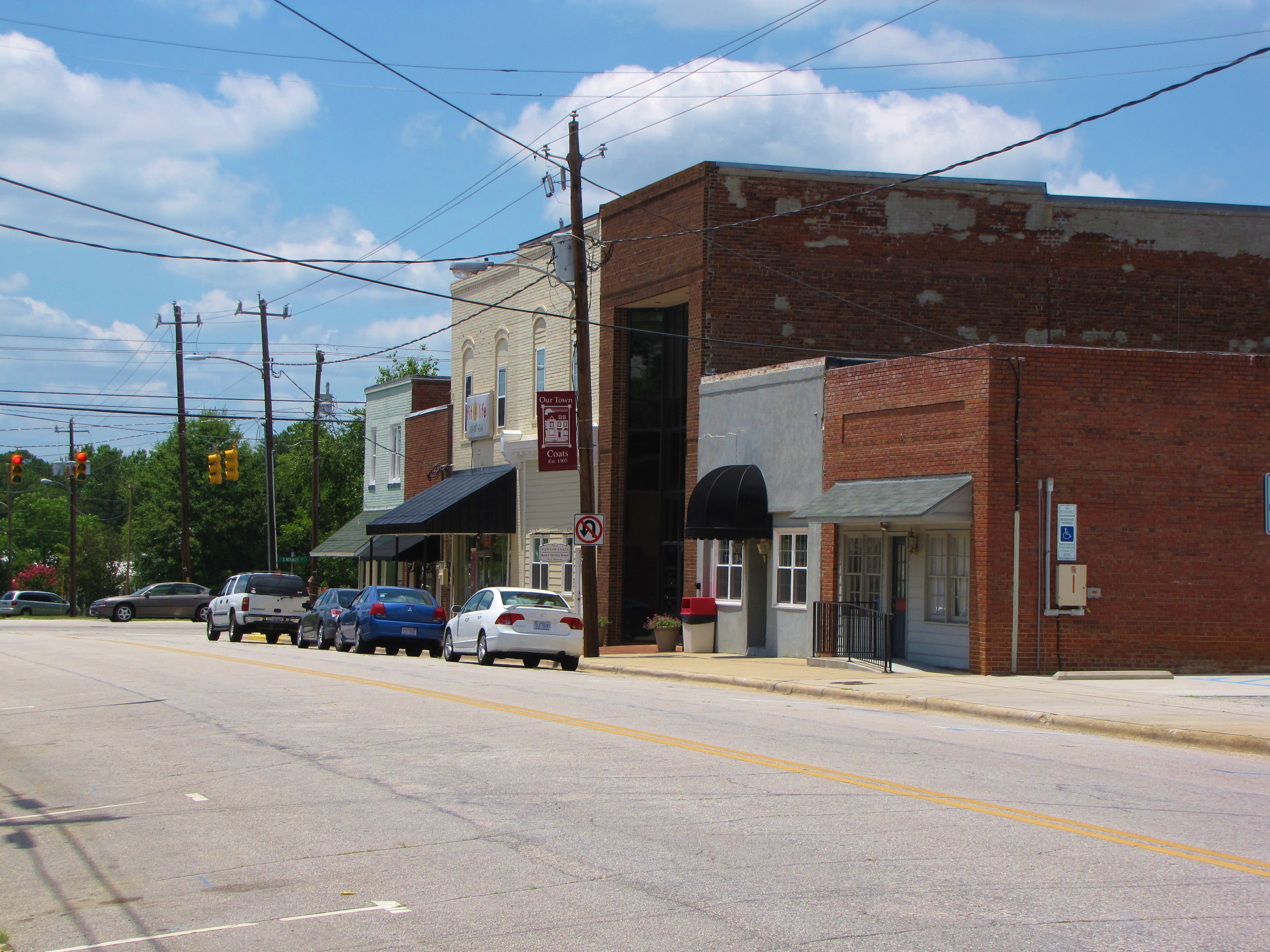
- Main Street in Coats
- Motto: "A Peaceful Place...A Friendly Face"
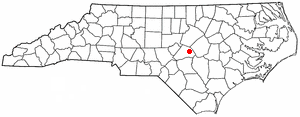
- Location of Coats, North Carolina
- Coordinates: 35°24′25″N 78°40′06″W
- Country: United States
- State: North Carolina
- County: Harnett

Government
  - Mayor: Chris Coats

Area
  - Total: 1.42 sq mi (3.69 km^{2})
  - Land: 1.42 sq mi (3.69 km^{2})
  - Water: 0 sq mi (0.00 km^{2})
- Elevation: 305 ft (93 m)

Population (2020)
  - Total: 2,155
  - Density: 1,512.9/sq mi (584.14/km^{2})
- Time zone: UTC-5 (Eastern (EST))
  - Summer (DST): UTC-4 (EDT)
- ZIP code: 27521
- Area codes: 910, 472
- FIPS code: 37-13360
- GNIS feature ID: 2406287
- Website: www.coatsnc.org

Coats is a town in Harnett County, North Carolina, United States. The population was 2,155 at the 2020 census. Coats is a part of the Anderson Creek Micropolitan Area, which is a part of the greater Raleigh–Durham–Cary Combined Statistical Area (CSA) as defined by the United States Census Bureau.

== Geography ==
Coats is located in eastern Harnett County. North Carolina Highway 55 (McKinley Street) passes through the center of town, leading north 8 miles (13 km) to Angier and south 6 miles (10 km) to Erwin. North Carolina Highway 27 (Stewart Street) crosses NC-55 in the northern part of Coats, leading east 7 miles (11 km) to Benson and west 9 miles (14 km) to Lillington, the Harnett county seat.

According to the United States Census Bureau, Coats has a total area of 1.4 square miles (3.7 km^{2}), all land.

== Demographics ==
Historical population
Census	Pop.	Note	%±
1910	169		—
1920	526		211.2%
1930	562		6.8%
1940	827		47.2%
1950	1,047		26.6%
1960	1,049		0.2%
1970	1,051		0.2%
1980	1,385		31.8%
1990	1,493		7.8%
2000	1,845		23.6%
2010	2,112		14.5%
2020	2,155		2.0%
U.S. Decennial Census

=== 2020 census ===
As of the 2020 census, Coats had a population of 2,155. The median age was 36.1 years. 24.9% of residents were under the age of 18 and 15.0% of residents were 65 years of age or older. For every 100 females, there were 91.6 males, and for every 100 females age 18 and over, there were 91.3 males age 18 and over.

0.0% of residents lived in urban areas, while 100.0% lived in rural areas.

There were 889 households in Coats, of which 33.7% had children under the age of 18 living in them. Of all households, 38.5% were married-couple households, 20.8% were households with a male householder and no spouse or partner present, and 35.0% were households with a female householder and no spouse or partner present. About 31.6% of all households were made up of individuals, and 14.8% had someone living alone who was 65 years of age or older.

There were 998 housing units, of which 10.9% were vacant. The homeowner vacancy rate was 0.9% and the rental vacancy rate was 9.6%.

Coats racial composition
Race	Number	Percentage
White (non-Hispanic)	1,320	61.25%
Black or African American (non-Hispanic)	363	16.84%
Native American	11	0.51%
Asian	12	0.56%
Other/Mixed	126	5.85%
Hispanic or Latino	323	14.99%

=== 2000 census ===
As of the census of 2000, there were 1,845 people, 755 households, and 471 families residing in the town. The population density was 1,341.5 inhabitants per square mile (518.0/km^{2}). There were 844 housing units at an average density of 613.7 per square mile (237.0/km^{2}). The racial makeup of the town was 80.22% White, 12.63% African American, 0.27% Native American, 0.65% Asian, 0.05% Pacific Islander, 5.04% from other races, and 1.14% from two or more races. Hispanic or Latino of any race were 11.87% of the population.

There were 755 households, out of which 28.2% had children under the age of 18 living with them, 46.8% were married couples living together, 11.0% had a female householder with no husband present, and 37.6% were non-families. 29.7% of all households were made up of individuals, and 11.1% had someone living alone who was 65 years of age or older. The average household size was 2.44 and the average family size was 2.99.

In the town, the population was spread out, with 23.1% under the age of 18, 13.4% from 18 to 24, 32.7% from 25 to 44, 18.2% from 45 to 64, and 12.6% who were 65 years of age or older. The median age was 32 years. For every 100 females, there were 95.2 males. For every 100 females age 18 and over, there were 96.4 males.

The median income for a household in the town was $26,023, and the median income for a family was $43,274. Males had a median income of $25,296 versus $23,203 for females. The per capita income for the town was $16,468. About 12.1% of families and 21.1% of the population were below the poverty line, including 19.3% of those under age 18 and 25.6% of those age 65 or over.
