= Harnett County, North Carolina =

County in North Carolina, United States

- County
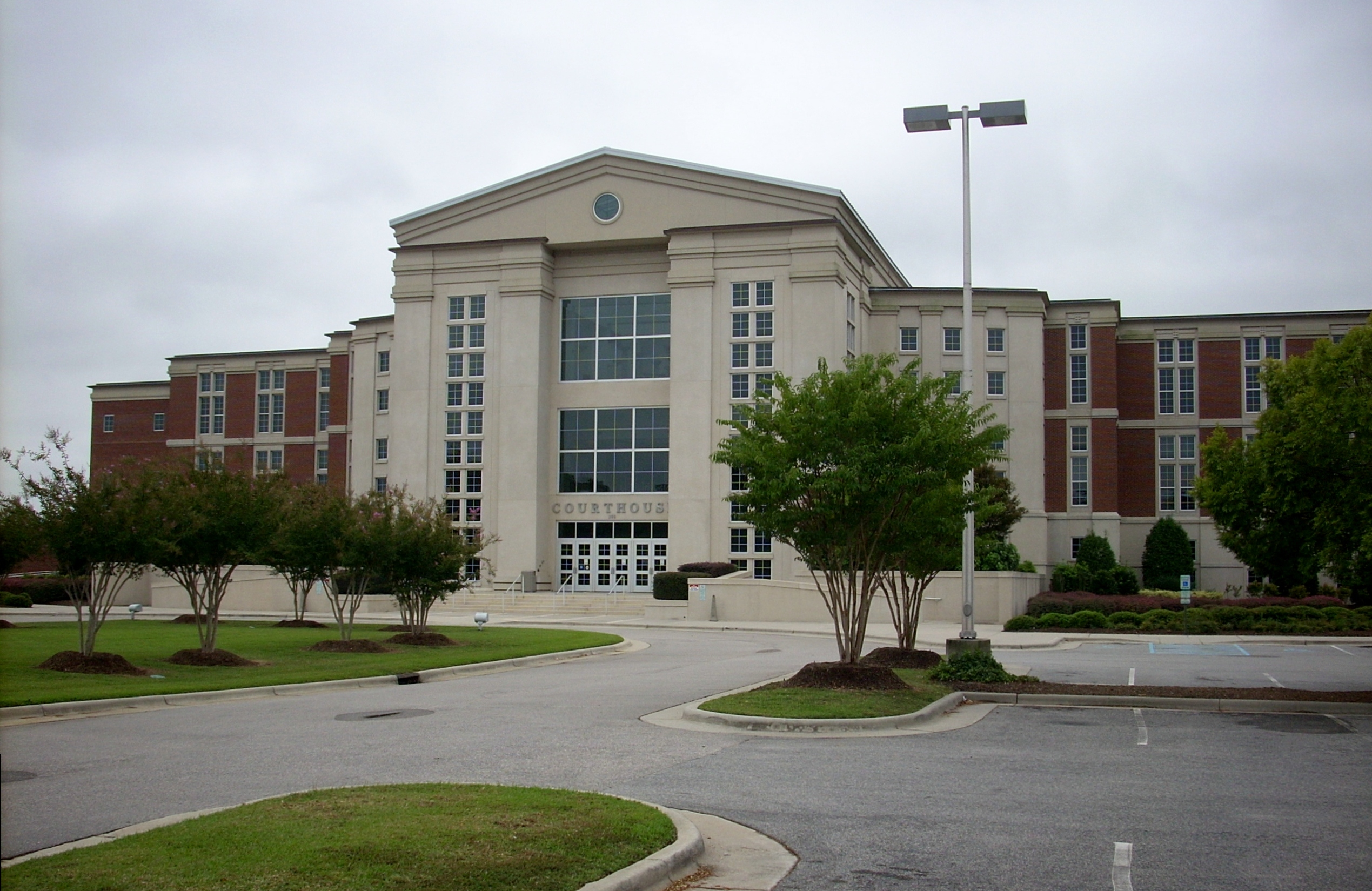
- Harnett County Courthouse

- Flag Seal Logo

- Location within the U.S. state of North Carolina
- Coordinates: 35.37°N 78.87°W
- Country: United States
- State: North Carolina
- Founded: 1855
- Named for: Cornelius Harnett
- Seat: Lillington
- Largest community: Anderson Creek

Area
  - Total: 601.22 sq mi (1,557.2 km^{2})
  - Land: 594.93 sq mi (1,540.9 km^{2})
  - Water: 6.29 sq mi (16.3 km^{2}) 1.05%

Population (2020)
  - Total: 133,568
  - Estimate (2025): 150,137 ▲
  - Density: 224.51/sq mi (86.68/km^{2})
- Time zone: UTC−5 (Eastern)
  - Summer (DST): UTC−4 (EDT)
- Congressional district: 13th
- Website: www.harnett.org

Harnett County (/ˈhɑːrnɪt/ HAR-nit) is a county located in the U.S. state of North Carolina. As of the 2020 census, the population was 133,568. Its county seat is Lillington; its largest community is Anderson Creek. Harnett County is part of the Anderson Creek, NC Micropolitan Statistical Area.

== History ==
Harnett County was formed in 1855 from land given by Cumberland County. It was named for American Revolutionary war soldier Cornelius Harnett, who was also a delegate to the Continental Congress. The first settlers came to the region in the mid-1720s, and were followed by Highland Scots immigrants. The Scots settled in the foothills, where land was more affordable, rather than in the rich alluvial soil area of the coastal plain. After the defeat by the British of Bonny Prince Charles at Culloden, Scots immigrants came up the Cape Fear River in ever increasing numbers and settled in western Harnett County. British immigrants had settled primarily along the banks of the Cape Fear River in the coastal area, generally from Erwin to Wilmington.

During the American Revolutionary War, many of the Scots were Loyalists. In their defeat in Scotland, they had been forced to take ironclad vows that prohibited taking up arms against the British. Some Rebels considered them traitors to the cause of Independence. Public executions of suspected spies occurred. One site near Lillington was the scene of a mass execution of "Scots traitors".

Though Harnett County was not a site of warfare during the Civil War, one of the last battles took place near Averasborough, which was once the third-most populated town in North Carolina, but is no longer in existence. During the Carolinas campaign, the Left Wing of General William Sherman's army under the command of Major General Henry W. Slocum defeated the army of General William Hardee in the Battle of Averasborough and proceeded eastward. A centennial celebration of the event was held in 1965 at the site of the battlefield.

== Geography ==
Interactive map of Harnett County

According to the U.S. Census Bureau, the county has a total area of 601.22 square miles (1,557.2 km^{2}), of which 594.93 square miles (1,540.9 km^{2}) is land and 6.29 square miles (16.3 km^{2}) (1.05%) is water.

=== State and local protected areas/sites ===
- Anderson Creek County Park
- Averasboro Battlefield and Museum
- Harris Game Land (part)
- Raven Rock State Park
- Rhodes Pond Game Land (part)

=== Major water bodies ===
- Black River
- Buies Creek
- Cape Fear River
- Cedar Creek
- East Buies Creek
- Little River
- Mingo Swamp
- Neills Creek
- Thorntons Creek
- Upper Little River
- West Buies Creek

=== Adjacent counties ===
- Wake County – north
- Johnston County – northeast
- Sampson County – southeast
- Cumberland County – south
- Moore County – west-southwest
- Lee County – west-northwest
- Chatham County – northwest

=== Major highways ===
- I-95
- Future I-685
- US 301
- US 401
- US 421
- NC 24
- NC 27
- NC 42
- NC 55
- NC 82
- NC 87
- NC 210
- NC 217

=== Major infrastructure ===
- Fort Bragg (Linden Oaks)
- Harnett Regional Jetport

== Demographics ==
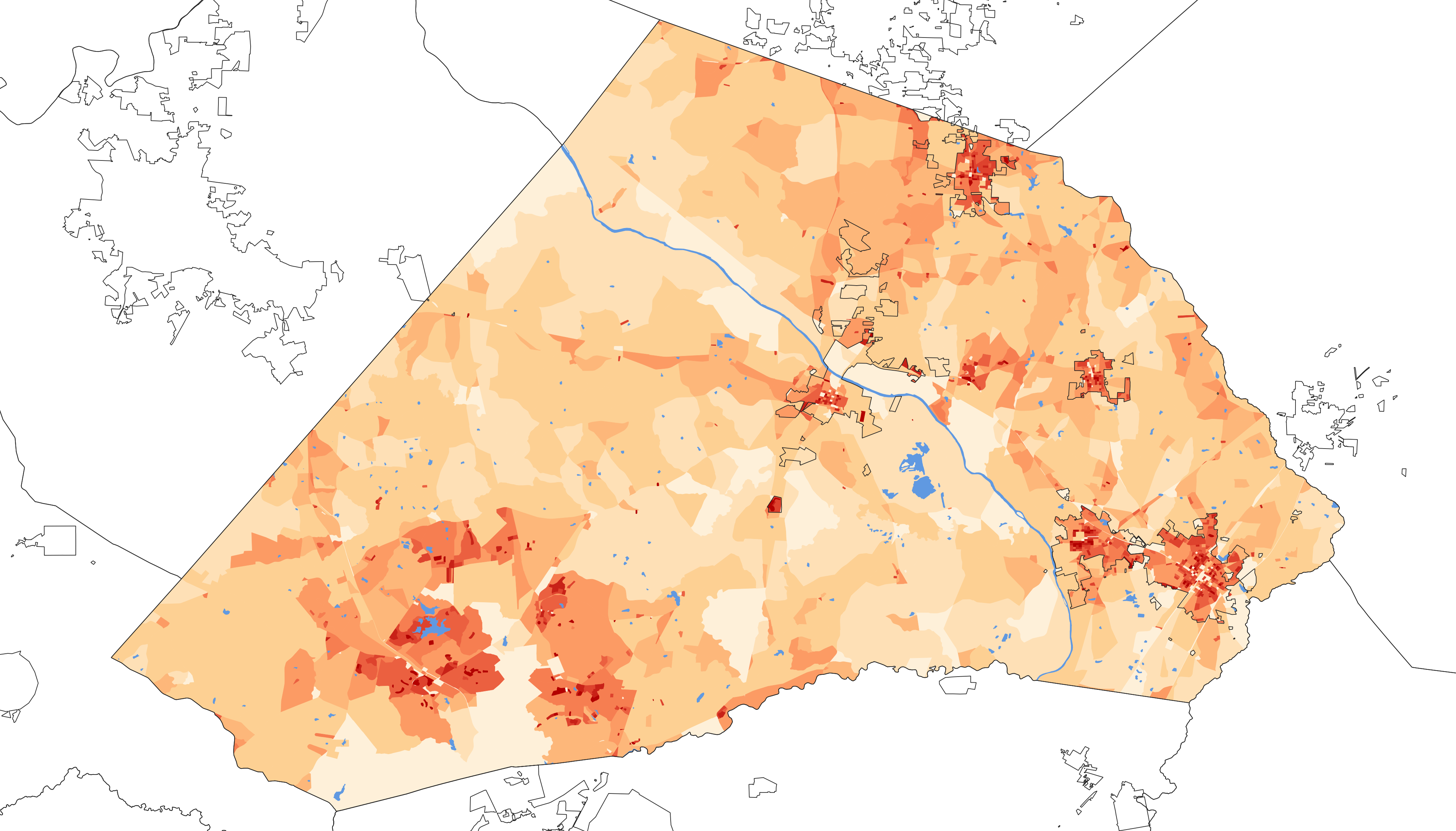
2020 population density of Harnett County NC by census block

=== Racial and ethnic composition ===
Harnett County, North Carolina – Racial and ethnic composition Note: the US Census treats Hispanic/Latino as an ethnic category. This table excludes Latinos from the racial categories and assigns them to a separate category. Hispanics/Latinos may be of any race.
Race / Ethnicity (NH = Non-Hispanic)	Pop 1980	Pop 1990	Pop 2000	Pop 2010	Pop 2020	% 1980	% 1990	% 2000	% 2010	% 2020
White alone (NH)	44,537	50,553	62,708	73,707	77,876	74.76%	74.54%	68.89%	64.27%	58.30%
Black or African American alone (NH)	13,611	15,221	20,371	23,591	26,769	22.85%	22.44%	22.38%	20.57%	20.04%
Native American or Alaska Native alone (NH)	488	591	752	991	978	0.82%	0.87%	0.83%	0.86%	0.73%
Asian alone (NH)	152	280	573	983	1,408	0.26%	0.41%	0.63%	0.86%	1.05%
Native Hawaiian or Pacific Islander alone (NH)	x	x	48	126	242	x	x	0.05%	0.11%	0.18%
Other race alone (NH)	113	18	118	202	707	0.19%	0.03%	0.13%	0.18%	0.53%
Mixed race or Multiracial (NH)	x	x	1,119	2,719	6,689	x	x	1.23%	2.37%	5.01%
Hispanic or Latino (any race)	669	1,159	5,336	12,359	18,899	1.12%	1.71%	5.86%	10.78%	14.15%
Total	59,570	67,822	91,025	114,678	133,568	100.00%	100.00%	100.00%	100.00%	100.00%

=== 2020 census ===
As of the 2020 census, the county had a population of 133,568, making it the 23rd most populous county in North Carolina; Anderson Creek was recorded as the largest community.

The median age was 35.0 years; 26.6% of residents were under the age of 18 and 13.3% were 65 years of age or older. For every 100 females there were 96.9 males, and for every 100 females age 18 and over there were 94.0 males age 18 and over.

The racial makeup of the county was 61.3% White, 20.5% Black or African American, 1.1% American Indian and Alaska Native, 1.1% Asian, 0.2% Native Hawaiian and Pacific Islander, 7.1% from some other race, and 8.7% from two or more races. Hispanic or Latino residents of any race comprised 14.1% of the population.

35.8% of residents lived in urban areas, while 64.2% lived in rural areas.

There were 48,083 households in the county, of which 37.4% had children under the age of 18 living in them. Of all households, 51.2% were married-couple households, 16.8% were households with a male householder and no spouse or partner present, and 25.8% were households with a female householder and no spouse or partner present. About 23.3% of all households were made up of individuals and 9.4% had someone living alone who was 65 years of age or older.

There were 52,876 housing units, of which 9.1% were vacant. Among occupied housing units, 66.8% were owner-occupied and 33.2% were renter-occupied. The homeowner vacancy rate was 2.1% and the rental vacancy rate was 7.6%.

=== Demographic change ===
Historical population

Historical population
Census	Pop.	Note	%±
1860	8,039		—
1870	8,895		10.6%
1880	10,862		22.1%
1890	13,700		26.1%
1900	15,988		16.7%
1910	22,174		38.7%
1920	28,313		27.7%
1930	37,911		33.9%
1940	44,239		16.7%
1950	47,605		7.6%
1960	48,236		1.3%
1970	49,667		3.0%
1980	59,570		19.9%
1990	67,822		13.9%
2000	91,025		34.2%
2010	114,678		26.0%
2020	133,568		16.5%
2025 (est.)	150,137	▲	12.4%
U.S. Decennial Census; 1790–1960 1900–1990; 1990–2000 2010 2020

Between 2010 and 2020, the population in Harnett County grew by 18,890 people, or 18.6 percent, though the largest city of Dunn (at the time) shrank by 4.8 percent during the same interval. Proportionately, the white population decreased by 6.7 percent, while the Hispanic/Latino population grew by 3.3 percent and the Asian population grew by 0.2 percent. The black and Native American populations remained about the same.

== Government and politics ==
Harnett is a typical "Solid South" county in its political history. Apart from the 1928 election when it defected to Herbert Hoover because of opposition to the Catholicism of Al Smith, Harnett voted rock-solid Democratic until the 1960s when opposition to increasing liberalism on racial policies turned the electorate toward the segregationist candidacy of George Wallace. Since then apart from when carried twice by native Southerner Jimmy Carter in 1976 and 1980, Harnett has been a solidly Republican county.

United States presidential election results for Harnett County, North Carolina
Year	Republican		Democratic		Third party(ies)	
Year	No.	%	No.	%	No.	%
1880	704	40.65%	1,028	59.35%	0	0.00%
1884	744	37.24%	1,254	62.76%	0	0.00%
1888	1,100	42.34%	1,498	57.66%	0	0.00%
1892	650	25.87%	1,222	48.63%	641	25.51%
1896	1,042	37.95%	1,676	61.03%	28	1.02%
1900	1,199	47.17%	1,342	52.79%	1	0.04%
1904	723	37.60%	1,169	60.79%	31	1.61%
1908	1,047	41.01%	1,501	58.79%	5	0.20%
1912	148	5.80%	1,364	53.43%	1,041	40.78%
1916	1,603	44.49%	1,992	55.29%	8	0.22%
1920	3,311	45.80%	3,919	54.20%	0	0.00%
1924	2,895	46.68%	3,296	53.14%	11	0.18%
1928	4,740	57.15%	3,554	42.85%	0	0.00%
1932	2,617	29.04%	6,346	70.42%	49	0.54%
1936	2,264	22.02%	8,018	77.98%	0	0.00%
1940	2,280	25.67%	6,602	74.33%	0	0.00%
1944	3,191	32.66%	6,579	67.34%	0	0.00%
1948	1,985	22.26%	6,608	74.11%	323	3.62%
1952	4,306	36.18%	7,595	63.82%	0	0.00%
1956	3,998	35.01%	7,421	64.99%	0	0.00%
1960	5,301	40.18%	7,892	59.82%	0	0.00%
1964	5,883	44.03%	7,477	55.97%	0	0.00%
1968	5,184	32.97%	4,007	25.49%	6,531	41.54%
1972	10,259	74.64%	3,347	24.35%	138	1.00%
1976	5,935	39.61%	8,992	60.01%	58	0.39%
1980	7,284	44.70%	8,791	53.95%	220	1.35%
1984	11,198	61.11%	7,106	38.78%	19	0.10%
1988	9,749	57.25%	7,259	42.63%	21	0.12%
1992	9,751	46.58%	8,473	40.48%	2,708	12.94%
1996	11,596	53.34%	8,767	40.33%	1,376	6.33%
2000	14,762	61.08%	9,155	37.88%	250	1.03%
2004	20,922	64.24%	11,563	35.50%	86	0.26%
2008	23,579	57.93%	16,785	41.24%	341	0.84%
2012	25,565	58.89%	17,331	39.92%	519	1.20%
2016	27,614	59.95%	16,737	36.33%	1,714	3.72%
2020	35,177	60.35%	22,093	37.90%	1,023	1.75%
2024	39,440	61.86%	23,472	36.81%	845	1.33%

Harnett County is a member of the regional Mid-Carolina Council of Governments.

== Education ==
Harnett County is home to Campbell University and to 27 pre-college schools: 4 primary schools, 13 elementary schools, 5 middle schools, 4 high schools, and 2 alternative schools.

Harnett County Schools is the local public school district.

Schools in the county include:

- Primary: Anderson Creek, Gentry, Harnett, North Harnett
- Elementary: Angier, Benhaven, Boone Trail, Buies Creek, Coats, Erwin, Highland, Johnsonville, LaFayette, Lillington-Shawtown, Overhills, South Harnett, Wayne Avenue
- Middle: Coats-Erwin, Dunn, Harnett Central, Highland, Overhills, Western Harnett
- High: Harnett Central, Overhills, Triton, Western Harnett
- Alternative: STAR Academy (grades 6–12), Harnett County Early College (grades 9-13)
- University: Campbell University

The Linden Oaks housing development, of Fort Bragg, has some Department of Defense Education Activity (DoDEA) schools, including Gary Ivan Gordon Elementary School, Randall David Shughart Elementary School, and Shugart Middle School. High school students living in Linden Oaks are assigned to Harnett County Schools' Overhills High School.

The county is served by the Harnett County Library System, based in Lillington with branches at Angier, Coats, Dunn, Erwin, Anderson Creek Primary School, and Boone Trail Community Center and Library.

== Communities ==
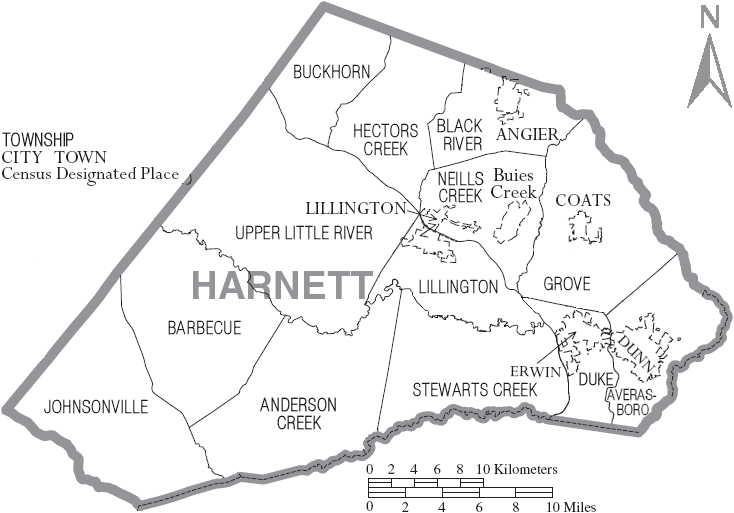
Map of Harnett County with municipal and township labels

=== City ===
- Dunn

=== Towns ===
- Angier (most)
- Coats
- Erwin
- Lillington (county seat)
- Fuquay-Varina (part)

=== Census-designated places ===
- Anderson Creek (largest community)
- Buies Creek
- Bunnlevel
- Mamers
- Spout Springs

=== Townships ===
- Anderson Creek
- Averasboro
- Barbecue
- Black River
- Buckhorn
- Duke
- Grove
- Hectors Creek
- Johnsonville
- Lillington
- Neills Creek
- Stewarts Creek
- Upper Little River

=== Other unincorporated communities ===
- Barbecue
- Barclaysville
- Cape Fear
- Chalybeate Springs
- Christian Light
- Cokesbury
- Duncan
- Flat Branch
- Flatwoods
- Johnsonville
- Kipling
- Luart
- Olivia
- Overhills
- Pineview
- Rawls
- Ryes
- Seminole
- Shawtown
- Turlington
- Raven Rock
- Norrington
- Mount Pisgah

== See also ==
- List of counties in North Carolina
- National Register of Historic Places listings in Harnett County, North Carolina
- Coharie Intra-tribal Council, Inc., state-recognized tribe that resides in the county
- USS Harnett County (LST-821)
