= Lillington, North Carolina =

- Town
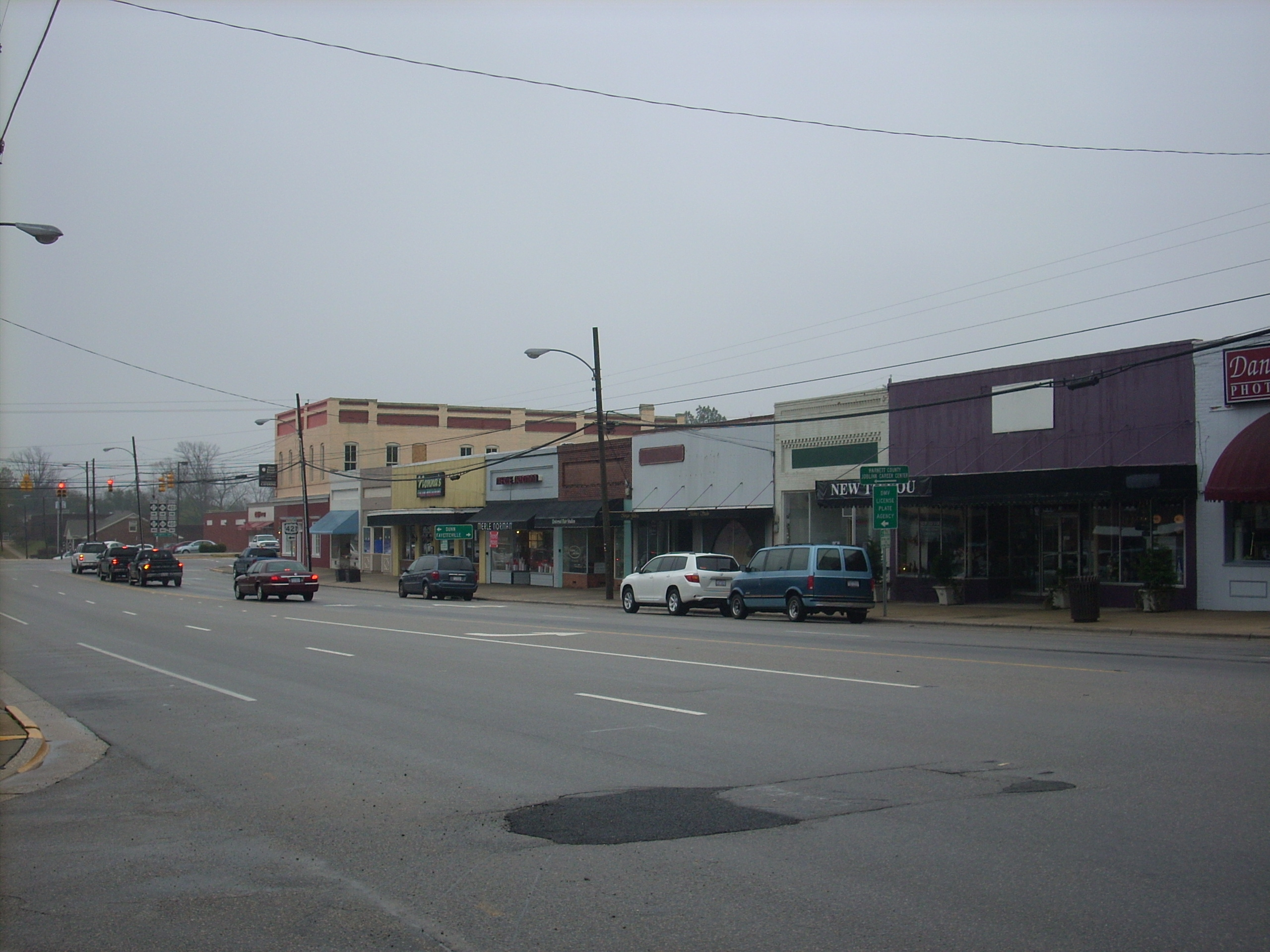
- Downtown Lillington

- Seal
- Nickname: Community on the Cape Fear
- Motto: "Welcome to the Heart of Harnett County"
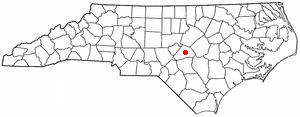
- Location of Lillington, North Carolina
- Coordinates: 35°24′51″N 78°48′36″W
- Country: United States
- State: North Carolina
- County: Harnett

Government
  - Type: Board of Commissioners
  - Mayor: Glenn McFadden

Area
  - Total: 6.31 sq mi (16.33 km^{2})
  - Land: 6.26 sq mi (16.21 km^{2})
  - Water: 0.046 sq mi (0.12 km^{2})
- Elevation: 167 ft (51 m)

Population (2020)
  - Total: 4,735
  - Density: 756.4/sq mi (292.05/km^{2})
- Time zone: UTC-5 (Eastern (EST))
  - Summer (DST): UTC-4 (EDT)
- ZIP code: 27546
- Area codes: 910, 472
- FIPS code: 37-38220
- GNIS feature ID: 2406020
- Website: lillingtonnc.org

Lillington is a town in and the county seat of Harnett County, North Carolina, United States. Its population was 3,194 at the 2010 census, and was 4,735 in the 2020 census. Lillington is a part of the Dunn micropolitan area, which is also a part of the greater Raleigh–Durham–Cary combined statistical area as defined by the United States Census Bureau.

== Geography ==
Lillington is located near the geographic center of Harnett County. U.S. Route 401 (Main Street) passes through the center of town, leading north 31 miles (50 km) to Raleigh, the state capital, and south 27 mi (43 km) to Fayetteville. U.S. Route 421 follows US-401 along North Main Street through the town, but turns west out of town via West Front Street, leading 22 mi (35 km) to Sanford. US-421 turns east from US-401 near the northern end of town and leads southeast 14 miles (23 km) to Dunn.

According to the United States Census Bureau, the town of Lillington has a total area of 4.6 sq mi (11.9 km^{2}), of which 0.04 sq mi (0.1 km^{2}), or 0.68%, is covered by water. The Cape Fear River crosses the northern part of the town.

Poorhouse Creek, a tributary of the Cape Fear River, begins on the southwestern end of Lillington.

== History ==
A post office called Lillington has been in operation since 1874. The town was originally called Harnett Court House. The town of Lillington is named for John Alexander Lillington (circa 1725–1786), aka Alexander John Lillington, who was a Patriot officer from North Carolina in the American Revolutionary War, notably fighting in the Battle of Moore's Creek Bridge in 1776 and serving as brigadier general in the state militia.

The Summer Villa and the McKay-Salmon House and Summerville Presbyterian Church and Cemetery are listed on the National Register of Historic Places.

== Demographics ==
Historical population
Census	Pop.	Note	%±
1880	98		—
1900	65		—
1910	380		484.6%
1920	593		56.1%
1930	752		26.8%
1940	914		21.5%
1950	1,061		16.1%
1960	1,242		17.1%
1970	1,155		−7.0%
1980	1,948		68.7%
1990	2,048		5.1%
2000	2,915		42.3%
2010	3,194		9.6%
2020	4,735		48.2%
U.S. Decennial Census; 2013 Estimate

=== 2020 census ===
Lillington racial composition
Race	Number	Percentage
White (non-Hispanic)	2,314	48.87%
Black or African American (non-Hispanic)	1,534	32.4%
Native American	39	0.82%
Asian	38	0.8%
Pacific Islander	8	0.17%
Other/mixed	225	4.75%
Hispanic or Latino	577	12.19%

As of the 2020 census, Lillington had a population of 4,735. The median age was 37.7 years. 20.8% of residents were under the age of 18 and 15.8% of residents were 65 years of age or older. For every 100 females there were 128.7 males, and for every 100 females age 18 and over there were 136.9 males age 18 and over.

57.7% of residents lived in urban areas, while 42.3% lived in rural areas.

There were 1,353 households in Lillington, of which 39.0% had children under the age of 18 living in them. Of family households, 37.0% were married-couple households, 17.2% had a male householder and no spouse or partner present, and 38.7% had a female householder and no spouse or partner present. About 32.0% of all households were made up of individuals and 14.2% had someone living alone who was 65 years of age or older.

There were 1,504 housing units, of which 10.0% were vacant. The homeowner vacancy rate was 3.9% and the rental vacancy rate was 5.5%.

=== 2000 census ===
As of the census of 2000, 2,915 people, 799 households, and 484 families resided in the town. The population density was 730.5 inhabitants per square mile (282.0/km^{2}). The 894 housing units averaged 224.0 per square mile (86.5/km^{2}). The racial makeup of the town was 54.75% White, 40.55% African American, 0.79% Native American, 0.45% Asian, and 2.26% from two or more races. Hispanics or Latinos of any race were 4.08% of the population.

Of the 799 households, 25.8% had children under 18 living with them, 39.5% were married couples living together, 18.0% had a female householder with no husband present, and 39.4% were not families. About 33.9% of all households were made up of individuals, and 17.6% had someone living alone who was 65 or older. The average household size was 2.26, and the average family size was 2.88.

In the town, the population was distributed as 15.2% under 18, 8.9% from 18 to 24, 40.4% from 25 to 44, 17.5% from 45 to 64, and 17.9% who were 65 or older. The median age was 37 years. For every 100 females, there were 141.9 males. For every 100 females age 18 and over, there were 154.1 males.

The median income for a household in the town was $30,670, and for a family was $42,366. Males had a median income of $30,305 versus $23,214 for females. The per capita income for the town was $13,664. About 12.4% of families and 20.3% of the population were below the poverty line, including 31.2% of those under age 18 and 20.4% of those age 65 or over.

== Notable people ==
- Daisy Hendley Gold (1893–1975, died in Lillington), author and journalist
- Paul Eliot Green (1894-1977) was a Pulitzer Prize-winning playwright.
- Rhett McLaughlin (Born 1977) Internetainer, Co-Host of Good Mythical Morning.
- Link Neal (Born 1978) Internetainer, Co-Host of Good Mythical Morning.

== See also ==
- Lillington Township, Harnett County, North Carolina
