= National Register of Historic Places listings in Harnett County, North Carolina =

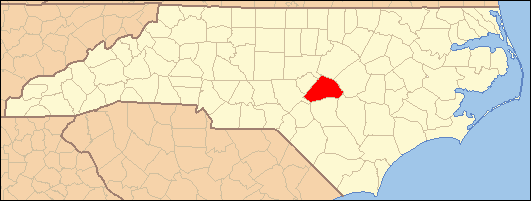

This list includes properties and districts listed on the National Register of Historic Places in Harnett County, North Carolina, United States. Click the "Map of all coordinates" link to the right to view a Google map of all properties and districts with latitude and longitude coordinates in the table below.

== Current listings ==
This National Park Service list is complete through NPS recent listings posted March 14, 2025.

	Name on the Register	Image	Date listed	Location	City or town	Description
1	Averasboro Battlefield Historic District		May 10, 2001 (#00001425)	Roughly bounded by Cape Fear R., NC 1780, the Black R., NC 1801; 35°15′16″N 78°39′52″W	Erwin	
2	James Archibald Campbell House		November 17, 1977 (#77001001)	U.S. 421; 35°24′28″N 78°45′00″W	Buies Creek	
3	Dunn Commercial Historic District	Dunn Commercial Historic District	September 9, 2009 (#09000702)	Roughly Bounded by Harnett St., Cumberland St., Clinton Ave. & Fayetteville Ave. 35°18′30″N 78°36′34″W	Dunn	
4	Erwin Commercial Historic District	Erwin Commercial Historic District	April 27, 2015 (#15000182)	100 Denim Drive, 101-127 E. H & 103-111 S. 13th Sts. 35°19′39″N 78°40′33″W	Erwin	
5	Harnett County Training School	Harnett County Training School	August 20, 2014 (#14000521)	610 E. Johnson St. 35°18′38″N 78°36′02″W	Dunn	
6	Harrington-Dewar House		January 23, 2009 (#08001363)	994 Fred Burns Rd. 35°33′13″N 78°54′38″W	Holly Springs	
7	Kenneth L. Howard House	Kenneth L. Howard House	August 19, 1982 (#82003465)	400 S. Layton Ave. 35°18′27″N 78°36′58″W	Dunn	
8	Ivy Burne		September 5, 1991 (#91001377)	NC 217, E side 0.4 miles S of jct. with NC 2027; 35°15′57″N 78°44′03″W	Linden	
9	Johnson Farm		April 15, 2010 (#10000207)	2095 Kipling Rd. (south side SR 1403, .2 miles east of SR 1425); 35°29′17″N 78°51′09″W	Kipling	
10	Lebanon		January 29, 1973 (#73001351)	4.5 miles SW of Dunn on NC 82; 35°15′35″N 78°40′17″W	Dunn	
11	Gen. William C. Lee House	Gen. William C. Lee House	November 25, 1983 (#83003968)	209 W. Divine St. 35°18′27″N 78°36′50″W	Dunn	
12	Long Valley Farm		June 6, 1994 (#94000032)	Address Restricted	Spring Lake	
13	John A. McKay House and Manufacturing Company	John A. McKay House and Manufacturing Company	April 10, 1986 (#86000739)	100 E. Divine St. 35°18′23″N 78°37′00″W	Dunn	
14	Dr. Wayman C. Melvin House		January 9, 2008 (#07001375)	6386 NC 217; 35°16′01″N 78°44′26″W	Linden	
15	Summer Villa and the McKay-Salmon House	Summer Villa and the McKay-Salmon House	April 25, 1985 (#85000902)	SR 1291; 35°24′18″N 78°51′54″W	Lillington	
16	Summerville Presbyterian Church and Cemetery	Summerville Presbyterian Church and Cemetery	April 25, 1985 (#85000903)	Off SR 1291; 35°24′10″N 78°51′19″W	Lillington	
17	Thorbiskope		January 23, 1986 (#86000132)	Off SR 2049 at SR 2050; 35°13′58″N 78°53′51″W	Bunnlevel	
18	Williams Grove School	Williams Grove School	May 26, 1995 (#95000659)	E. Depot St. N side, between Hickory and Willow Sts. 35°30′27″N 78°44′06″W	Angier	

== See also ==
- National Register of Historic Places listings in North Carolina
- List of National Historic Landmarks in North Carolina
