= Howard House =

Howard House may refer to:

Person

- Howard P. House (1908–2003), American physician

Places in the United Kingdom

- Howard House, Stepney, model dwellings built by the Metropolitan Association for Improving the Dwellings of the Industrious Classes
- Howard House, Bedford, the property where John Howard (prison reformer) stayed.

Places in the United States

(by state then city)

- John W. Howard House and Outbuildings, Greenville, Alabama, listed on the NRHP in Butler County
- Howard Home, Jeffersonville, Indiana, NRHP-listed
- Frank Howard House, Atchison, Kansas, listed on the NRHP in Atchison County
- Howard-Hardy House, Louisville, Kentucky, listed on the NRHP in downtown Louisville
- Howard-Gettys House, Louisville, Kentucky, listed on the NRHP in Jefferson County
- George Howard House, Baltimore, Maryland, a Baltimore City Landmark
- Horatio N. Howard House, Pontiac, Michigan, listed on the NRHP in Oakland County
- Howard Homestead, Duanesburg, New York, listed on the NRHP in Schenectady County
- Howard Mansion and Carriage House, Hyde Park, New York, NRHP-listed
- Howard House (East New York), New York, New York, a former hotel and railroad depot
- Kenneth L. Howard House, Dunn, North Carolina, listed on the NRHP in Harnett County
- Howard-Royal House, Salemburg, North Carolina, listed on the NRHP in Sampson County
- C.R. Howard House, Aurora, Ohio, listed on the NRHP in Portage County
- Adam Howard House, Galion, Ohio, listed on the NRHP in Crawford County
- Howard House (Seattle), Seattle, Oregon, an art gallery
- Kincaid-Howard House, Fincastle, Tennessee, listed on the NRHP in Campbell County
- McNutt-Howard House, Maryville, Tennessee, listed on the NRHP in Blount County
- Robert E. Howard House, Cross Plains, Texas, listed on the NRHP in Callahan County
- Howard House (Palestine, Texas), NRHP-listed, in Anderson County
- Hill-Howard House, Victoria, Texas, listed on the NRHP in Victoria County
- Howard-Bell-Feather House, Riner, Virginia, listed on the NRHP in Montgomery County
- A. E. Howard House, Yakima, Washington, listed on the NRHP in Yakima County
- Gen. Oliver Otis Howard House, Washington, D.C., listed on the NRHP in Washington, D.C.
