= James Toon =

James Toon may refer to:

- James Toon (American football) (1938–2011), American gridiron football player and coach
- James Toon (cricketer) (1916–1987), English cricketer
