= Black River Township, Harnett County, North Carolina =

Township in Harnett County, North Carolina, U.S.

Coordinates: 35.4945763°N 78.7249469°W

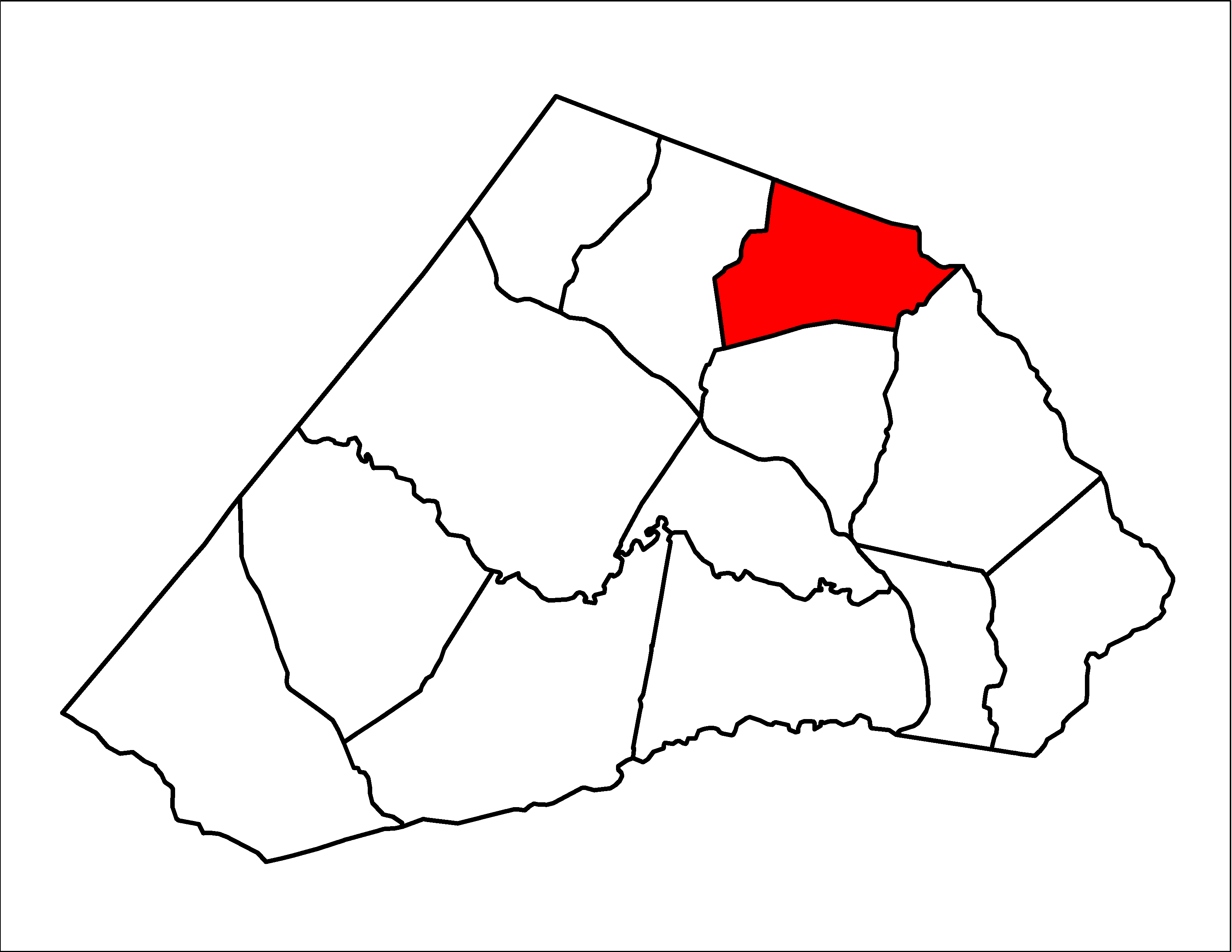
Location of Black River Township in Harnett County, N.C.

Black River Township is one of thirteen townships in Harnett County, North Carolina, United States. The township had a population of 8,085 according to the 2000 census, 11,588 according to the 2020 census, &12,444 according to the 2021 census. It is a part of the Dunn Micropolitan Area, which is also a part of the greater Raleigh–Durham–Cary Combined Statistical Area (CSA) as defined by the United States Census Bureau.

Geographically, Black River Township occupies 29.35 square miles (76.0 km^{2}) in northern Harnett County. The only incorporated municipality within Black River Township is Angier. The township's northern border is with Wake County to the northwest and Johnston County to the northeast.

== Watersheds ==
Neills Creek, a tributary to the Cape Fear River, flows through the west side of Black River township. The Black River rises and flows through the eastern side.
