= Jamestown Exposition =

1907 exposition in Norfolk, Virginia, US

- Jamestown Exposition Site Buildings
- U.S. National Register of Historic Places
- U.S. Historic district
- Virginia Landmarks Register
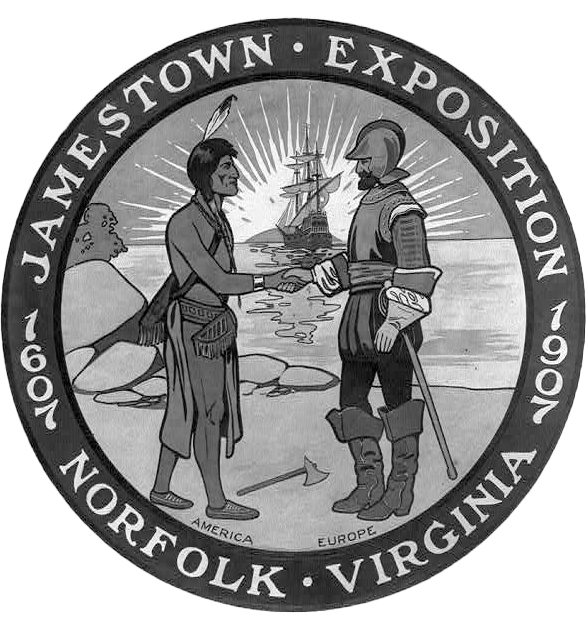
- Exposition Seal

- Location within Virginia Location within the United States
- Location: Bounded by Bacon, Powhatan, Farragut, Gilbert, Bainbridge, and the harbor, Norfolk, Virginia
- Coordinates: 36°57′08″N 76°18′47″W
- Area: 130 acres (53 ha)
- Built: 1907
- Architectural style: Colonial Revival, Georgian Revival
- NRHP reference No.: 75002114
- VLR No.: 122-0054

Significant dates
- Added to NRHP: October 20, 1975
- Designated VLR: February 18, 1975

The Jamestown Exposition, also known as the Jamestown Ter-Centennial Exposition of 1907, was one of the many world's fairs and expositions that were popular in the United States in the early part of the 20th century. Commemorating the 300th anniversary of the founding of Jamestown in the Virginia Colony, it was held from April 26 to December 1, 1907, at Sewell's Point on Hampton Roads, in Norfolk, Virginia. It celebrated the first permanent English settlement in the present United States. In 1975, the 20 remaining exposition buildings were included on the National Register of Historic Places as a national historic district.

== Site selection ==
Early in the 20th century, as the tercentennial of the 1607 Founding of Jamestown in the Virginia Colony neared, leaders in Norfolk, Virginia began a campaign to have the celebration held there. The Association for the Preservation of Virginia Antiquities had gotten the ball rolling in 1900 by calling for a celebration to honor the establishment of the first permanent English colony in the New World at Jamestown, to be held on the 300th anniversary.

During the planning phase, virtually no one thought that the original site of Jamestown would be suitable, as it was isolated and long-abandoned. There were no local facilities to handle large crowds, and it was believed that the fort housing the settlement had long ago been swallowed by the James River. No rail lines ran near Jamestown. Many Virginia residents thought that Richmond, the state capital, would be chosen as the site of the celebration.

On February 4, 1901, James M. Thomson began a campaign for the celebration in his Norfolk Dispatch, proclaiming: "Norfolk is undoubtedly the proper place for the holding of this celebration. Norfolk is today the center of the most populous portion of Virginia, and every historical, business and sentimental reason can be adduced in favor of the celebration taking place here rather than in Richmond." The Dispatch was an unrelenting champion of Norfolk as the site for the exposition, noting in subsequent editorials that "Richmond has absolutely no claim to the celebration except her location on the James River."

By September 1901, the Norfolk City Council had supported the project, and in December, 100 prominent residents of Hampton Roads journeyed to Richmond to urge Norfolk to be the site. In 1902, the Jamestown Exposition Co. was incorporated. Former Governor of Virginia Fitzhugh Lee, a nephew of General Robert E. Lee, was named its president.

The Company decided to locate the international exposition on a mile-long frontage at Sewell's Point. The location was almost an equal distance from the cities of Norfolk, Portsmouth, Newport News and Hampton. While hard to reach by land, it was much more favorably accessible by water, which ultimately proved a great asset.

=== Issues with Sewell's Point ===
Because of the isolation of Sewell's Point, the company's choice made the site difficult to reach by land. Access to the site required the construction of new roads to develop it for the Exposition. Two existing streetcar lines had to be extended considerably to reach the site. The eastern portion of the newly built Tidewater Railway (soon to become part of the coal-hauling Virginian Railway) was rushed into service, and the local Norfolk Southern Railway agreed to add substantial passenger capacity in conjunction with the Tidewater Railway to prepare to move the thousands of daily attendees anticipated. New piers had to be constructed on the shore to move supplies to exposition buildings. Hotels had to be raised to handle the millions of expected exposition visitors. Bad weather slowed everything.

Another major setback was the death of Fitzhugh Lee in 1905 while traveling in New England to drum up trade for the celebration. Henry St. George Tucker III, a former Virginia Congressman, succeeded him. The Norfolk businessman David Lowenberg ran most of the operation as director general.

== Opening day ==
Newsreel footage from 1907, of Theodore Roosevelt at opening day and a later Georgia Day celebration

Opening day was April 26, 1907, exactly 300 years after Christopher Newport and his band of English colonists made their first landing in Virginia at the point where the southern shore of the Chesapeake Bay meets the Atlantic Ocean. They recorded giving thanks, planting a cross, and naming the location Cape Henry. Within the next few weeks, they found and explored the harbor now known as Hampton Roads. Sailing upriver on its biggest tributary, the James River, they eventually settled at what they would call Jamestown to begin their first settlement.

The first day of the Exposition had its share of difficulties. Only a fifth of the electric lights could be turned on, and the Warpath recreation area was far from ready. Construction of the government pier left much of the ground in the center of the exposition muddy soup. Of the thirty-eight principal buildings and works that the Exposition Company planned for the fair, only fourteen had been completed by opening day—the Fire Engine House and the Waterfront Board Walk were completed only in the last two days. The company failed to complete two planned buildings, the Historic Art and Education buildings, by the Exposition's end in late November.

Prominent visitors included President Theodore Roosevelt, who opened the exposition and presided over the naval review. Additional prominent attendees who accompanied the President were Frederick Grant, son of Ulysses Grant, Mark Twain, and Booker T. Washington. After the opening day, attendance dropped sharply and never again achieved projections. The Exposition Company had initially lobbied the federal government for $1,640,000 and received a loan for an additional million, to be repaid through a lien on 40% of the gate receipts. When crowds failed to appear in the anticipated numbers—the exposition was attracting an average of 13,000 visitors daily, only 7,400 of whom paid entrance—the company could repay only $140,000 of the million-dollar loan. The fair began attracting negative attention in the press as early as January before it opened, as a divisive split between planning committee members became public. The press who arrived for the opening day found the grounds unfinished, the hotels overpriced, and the transportation between the fair and nearby towns insufficient.

== Exhibitions ==
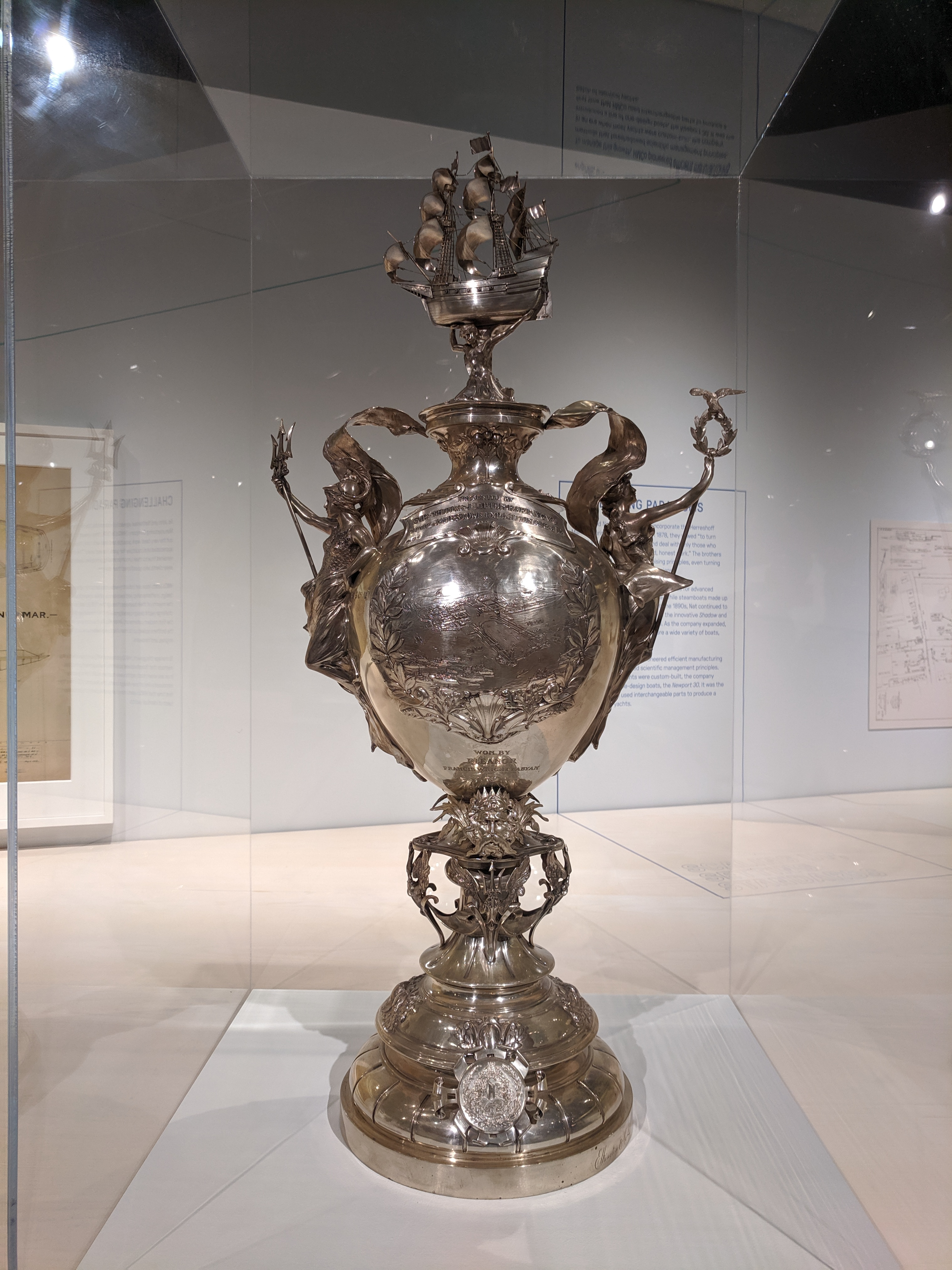
Trophy awarded at the Exposition regatta by Thomas Lipton.

In time, things improved, and portions of the event became spectacular. Planners asked each US state to contribute a building to the Exposition. While some of these buildings offered exhibits on the states' history and industry, others primarily served as quasi-embassies for visitors from the state, providing sitting rooms and guest services. Lack of interest or funds prevented participation by all, but 21 states funded houses, which bore their names: for example, Pennsylvania House, Virginia House, New Hampshire House, etc. During the exposition, days were set aside to honor the states individually. The governor of each state usually appeared to greet visitors to the state's house on these days. On June 10, 1907, "Georgia Day," Theodore Roosevelt returned to the Exposition, delivering a speech on the steps of the Georgia Building, which had been modeled after his mother's family's home. Emily Nelson Ritchie McLean, the President General of the Daughters of the American Revolution, was also in attendance.

The 340-acre (140 ha) site included a 122 by 60 ft (37 by 18 m) relief model of the Panama Canal, a wild animal show, a Wild West show, and a re-creation of the then-recent San Francisco earthquake. Possibly the most popular attraction was a re-creation of the Battle of Hampton Roads, the first battle between two ironclad warships, the USS Monitor and the CSS Virginia, which had taken place within sight of Sewell's Point 40 years earlier during the Civil War. The exterior of the Merrimac-Monitor Building looked somewhat like a battleship, while the interior held a large, circular exhibit describing the battle.

United States Government Pier

=== International Naval Review ===
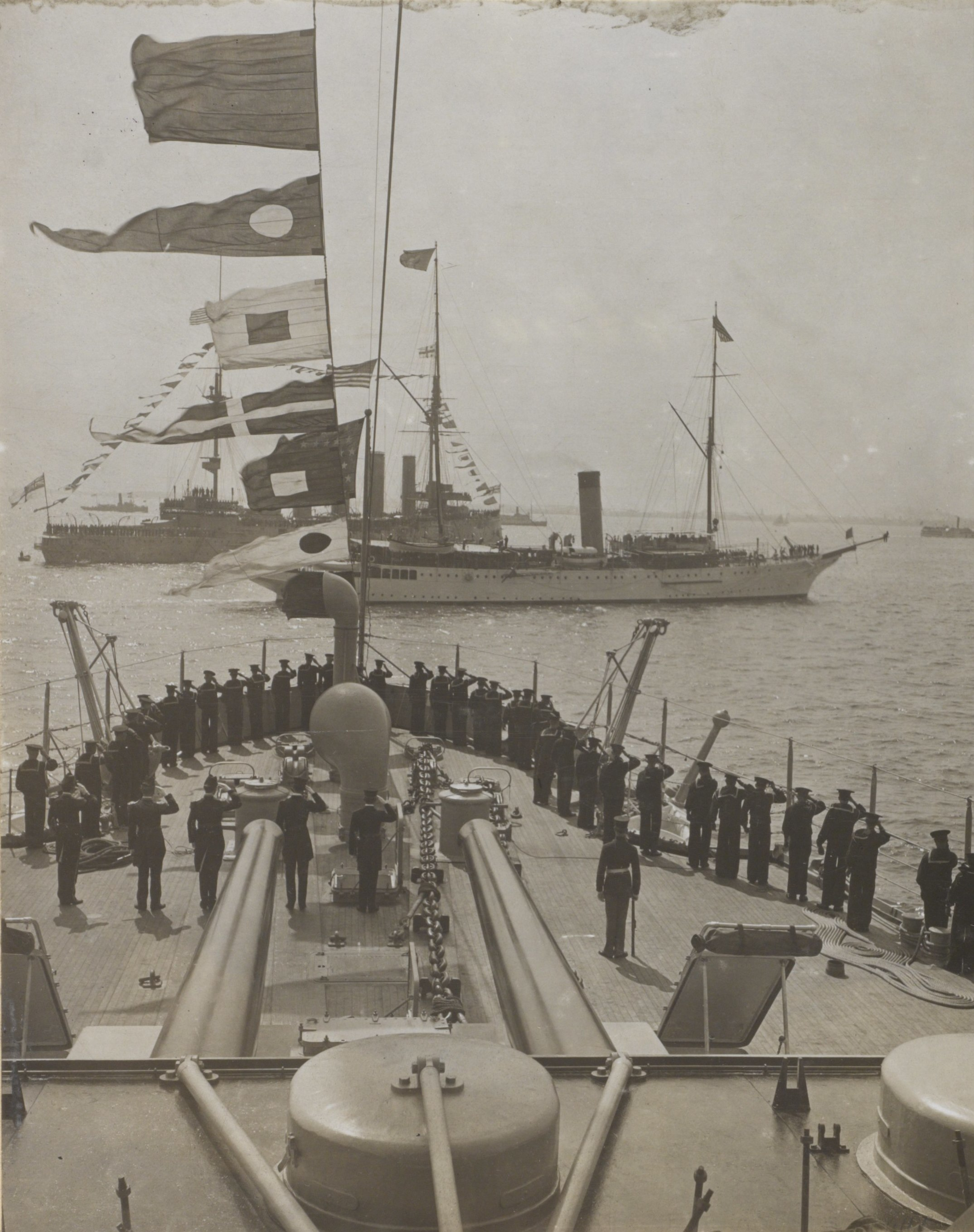
US Navy officers saluting President Roosevelt onboard USS Mayflower

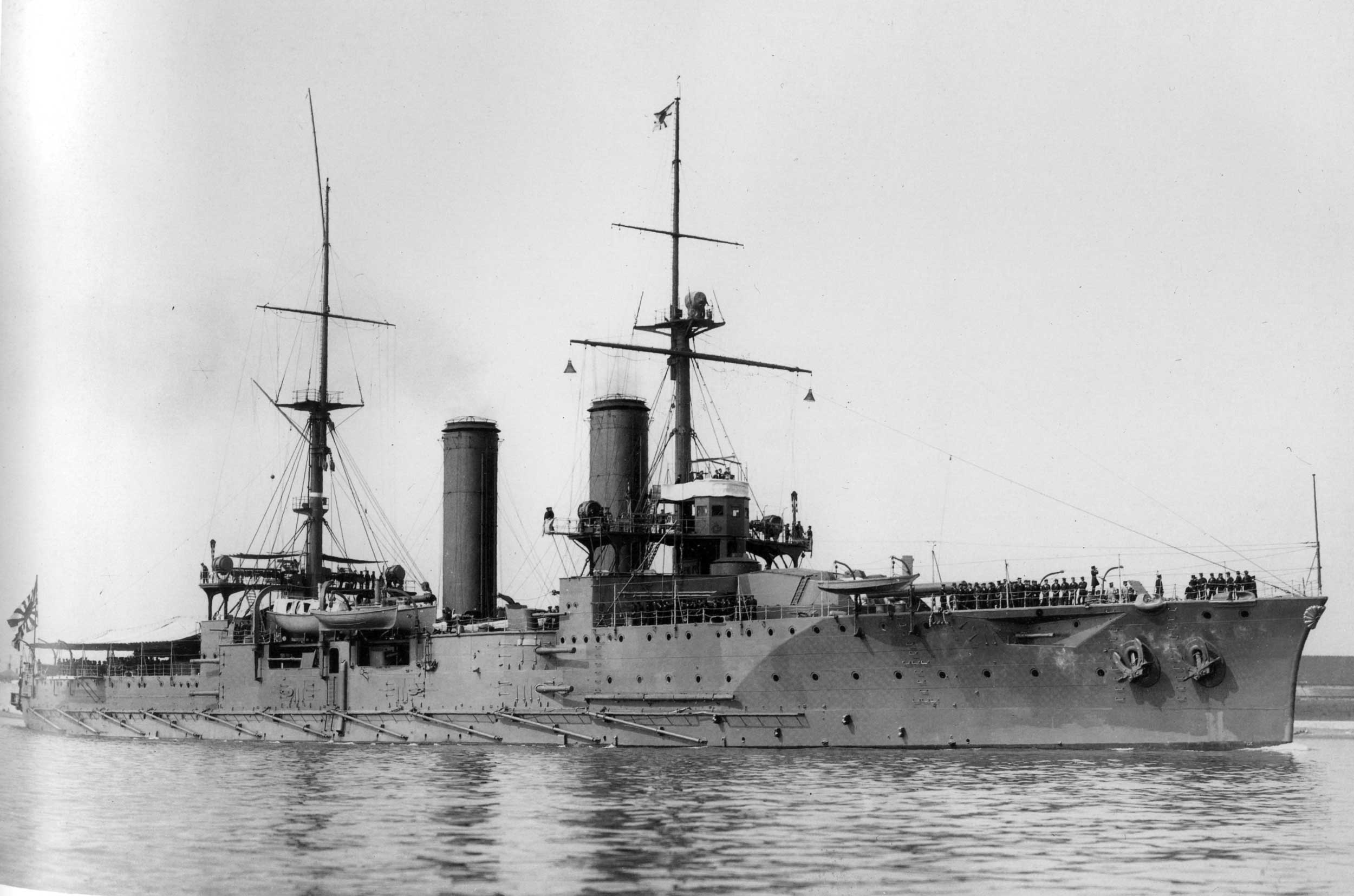
Japanese battlecruiser Tsukuba

The event included the naval review of warship fleets on June 10 by President Theodore Roosevelt, who arrived on the presidential yacht Mayflower. As the news coverage of Battle of Tsushima, Treaty of Portsmouth, and President Roosevelt winning the 1906 Nobel Peace Prize for hosting the peace treaty conference at Portsmouth were fresh in the mind of people, display of naval and military technology was an important theme that distinguished this exposition from the World Fairs in the past. The review included the sixteen battleships of the US Navy Atlantic Fleet including USS Georgia and many warships from foreign countries. One such example was the Imperial Japanese Navy cruiser Tsukuba, displaying the newest naval concept of a 'Battlecruiser' that had the speed of a cruiser with the firepower and protective armor of a battleship.

Mark Twain and Henry H. Rogers also paid a visit, arriving in the latter's yacht Kanawha. Ships of two squadrons commanded by Admiral Robley D. Evans stood off in the bay from Sewell's Point. On opening day, an international fleet of fifty-one ships was on display. The assembly included 16 battleships, five cruisers, and six destroyers. The US Navy warships remained in Hampton Roads after the exposition closed and became President Theodore Roosevelt's Great White Fleet under Admiral Evans, which toured the globe as evidence of the nation's military might.

In addition to the ships anchored at Hampton Roads, the exposition provided a campground sufficient to house five thousand troops. Military and "semi-military" men in uniform were admitted for fifty cents for a day's admission. They were permitted to come and go after that as long as they were encamped at the exposition grounds and drilled regularly on the parade ground. This accounts for many of the 43% of people tallied entering the fair daily who did not pay admission. The organizers felt the troops provided informal entertainment and were an attraction to the exposition.

=== Other technologies ===
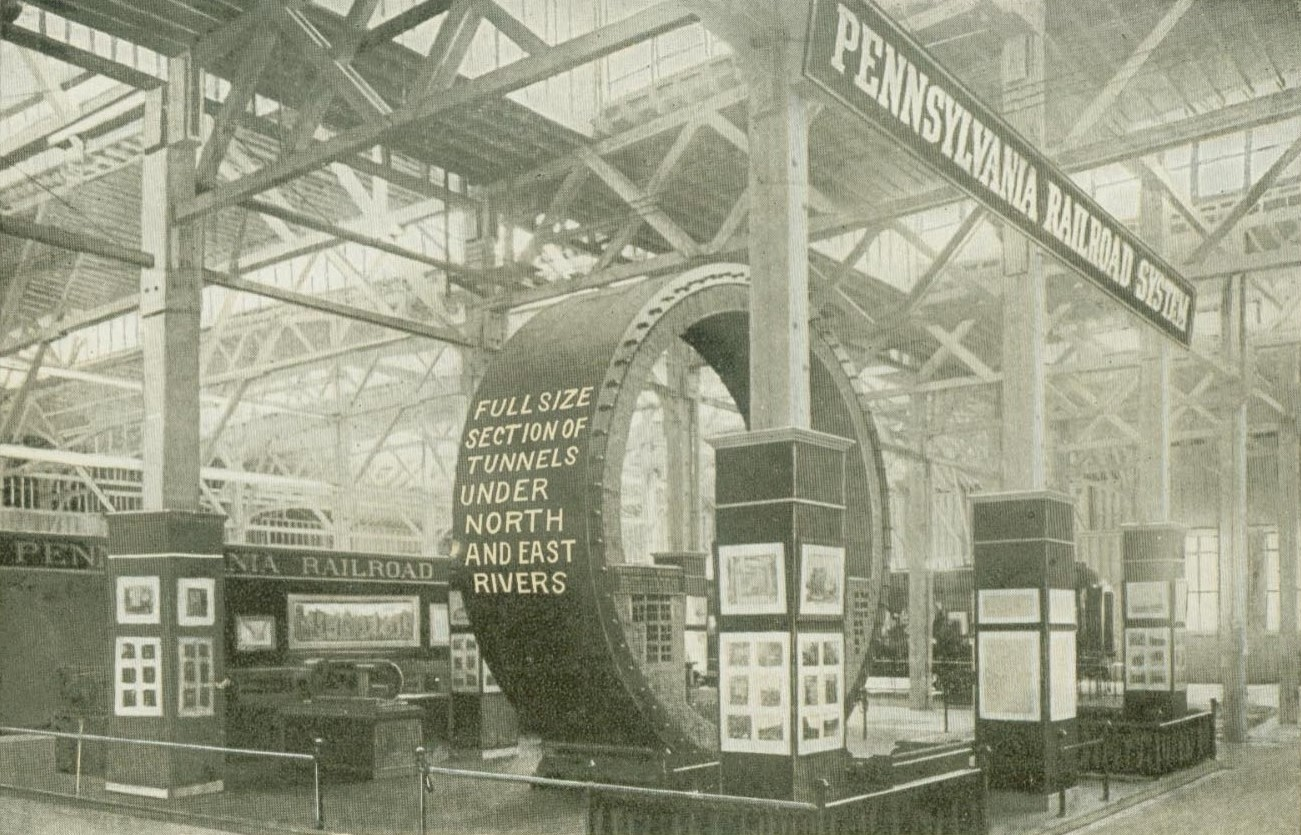
Pennsylvania Railroad exhibit

The railroads put on elaborate displays. The Chesapeake and Ohio Railway (C&O) displayed its entire F.F.V. passenger train. The New York Central (NYC) electric engine on display was part of its Grand Central Station modernization project in New York City. The Pennsylvania Railroad (PRR) brought a 23-foot (7.0 m)-diameter section of its new East River Tunnel. The same section was later installed underwater as part of the link to the new Penn Station in New York City, with an inscription that it had been displayed at the Jamestown Exposition.

Other technology included late-model automobiles, auto-boats, and electric and steam traction engines, each in its highest stage of development.

=== Negro Building ===
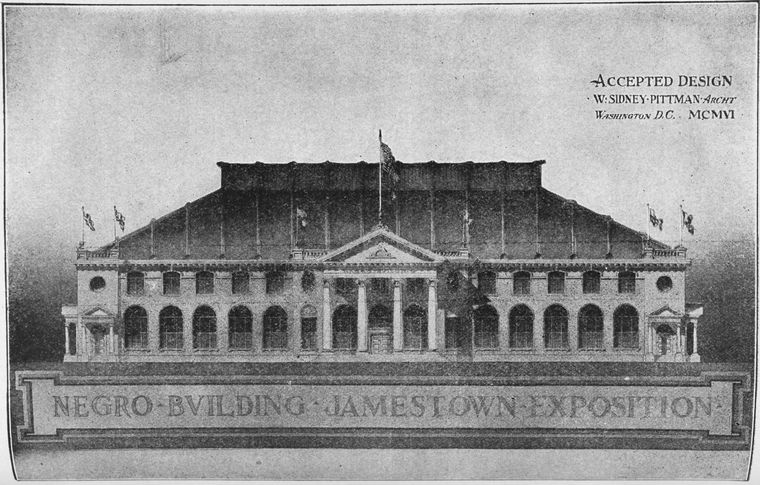
Negro Building, Jamestown Exposition

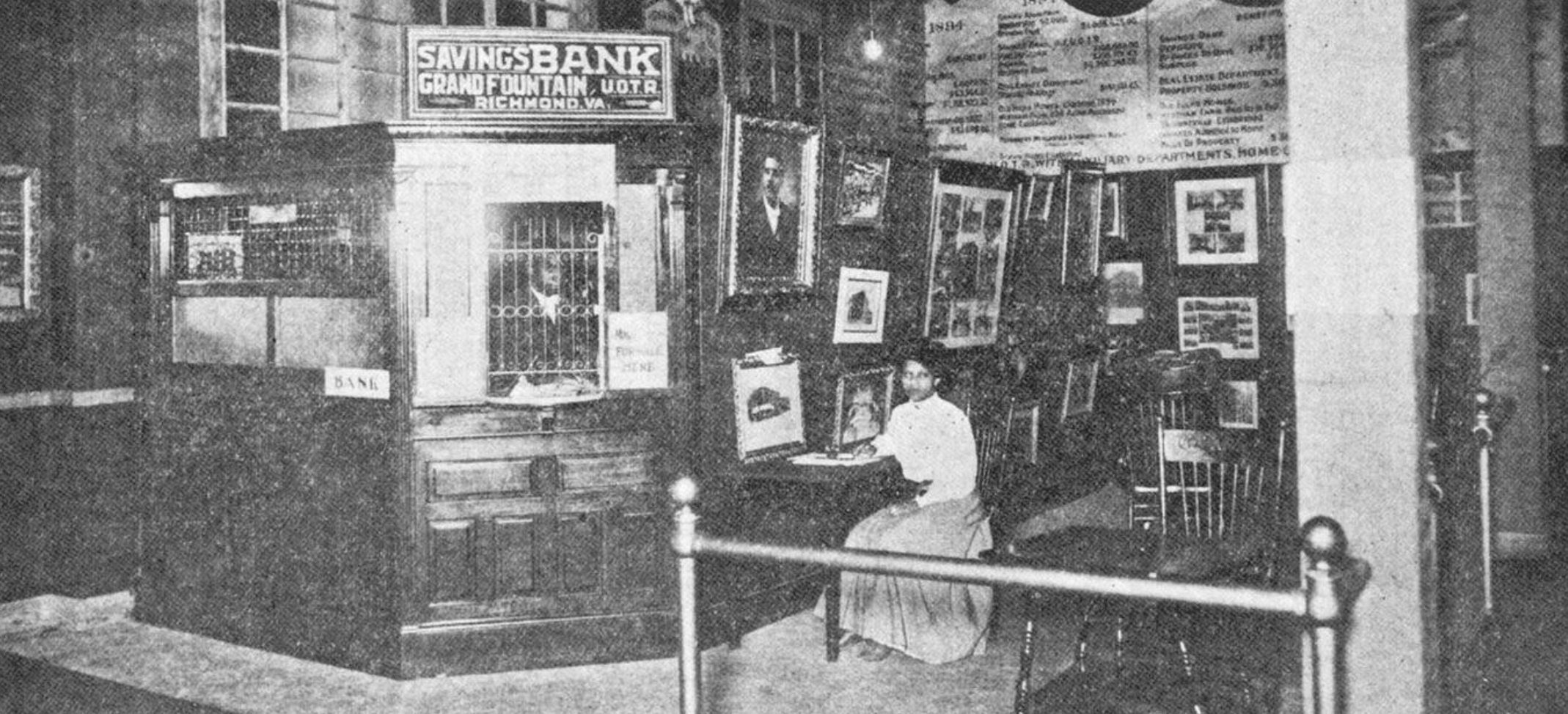
A working branch of The True Reformers Savings Bank at the 1907 Negro Building at the Jamestown Exposition

A controversial feature of the exposition was its "Negro Building," designed by W. Sydney Pittman, which displays showed the progress of African Americans. Richmond lawyer and businessman Giles Beecher Jackson was a leader in the formation of the Negro Department at the Jamestown Exposition and had worked hard to raise funds for the exhibition.

The Negro Building exhibit was charged with being a "Jim Crow affair" and criticized by prominent figures like W. E. B. Du Bois who voiced his complaint in Appeal to Reason. However, other Black Americans saw the Negro Building as an achievement. The organizer, Giles B. Jackson, felt that having the exhibition in a separate Negro Hall allowed for a greater variety and completeness of presentation and that it could better highlight the achievements of African Americans. He said a separate building demonstrated black "capacity as a producer and the maker of anything and everything that has been made by other races." For fairgoers sharing his opinion, many of whom were Black middle-class Southerners, the Negro Building represented an achievement that few white Southerners would have thought possible: the building was architecturally elegant, designed and built by blacks, with funds raised by blacks. A series of dioramas by Meta Vaux Warrick Fuller, a black woman artist from Philadelphia, comprised the first artwork done by an African American with federal funds.

Exhibits from both occupational and classical black educational institutions were represented. While the Exposition was a money-loser and derided by many in the press, the Negro Hall achieved nearly universal praise. It was the only exhibit visited by President Roosevelt in either of his visits. Although most commercial ventures lost money, the branch bank in the Negro Hall, affiliated with a local African-American institution, recorded one of the Exposition's only profits, doing $75,731.87 in business in the course of the fair.

== Results ==
In conjunction with the first day of Exposition, the U.S. Post Office issued a series of three commemorative stamps celebrating the 300th anniversary of the founding of Jamestown. The 1-cent value portrayed Captain John Smith, the 2-cent value depicts the landing of Captain Smith and colonists at Chesapeake Bay, and the 5-cent depicts Pocahontas.

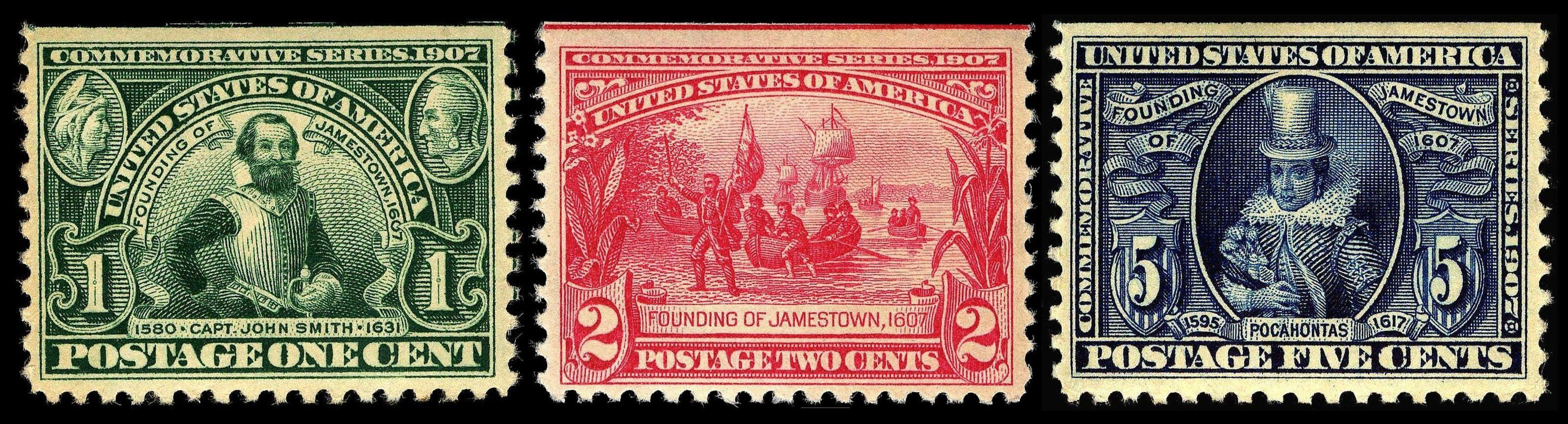
Jamestown Exposition commemorative stamps, 1907 Issue

The Exposition closed on December 1, 1907, as a financial failure, losing several million dollars. Attendance had been 3 million, a fraction of the numbers promised by the promoters. But, it had other benefits for the United States, Norfolk, and Hampton Roads.

Nearly every Congressman and Senator of prominence had attended the exposition, which showcased Sewell's Point. Of naval importance in the early American Civil War, it had been virtually forgotten since shortly after its bombardment and returned to Union control in 1862. The admirals in Norfolk urged redevelopment of the exposition site as a Naval Base to use the infrastructure that had been built.

Nearly ten years would elapse before the idea, given impetus by World War I, would become a reality. The new Naval Base was aided by the improvements remaining from the Exposition, the strategic location at Sewell's Point on Hampton Roads, and the large amount of vacant land in the area. The coal piers and storage yards of the Virginian Railway (VGN), built by William N. Page and Henry H. Rogers and completed in 1909, were immediately adjacent to the Exposition site. The well-engineered VGN was a valuable link directly to the bituminous coal of southern West Virginia, which the Navy strongly preferred for its steam-powered ships.

On June 28, 1917, President Woodrow Wilson set aside $2.8 million for land purchase and the erection of storehouses and piers for what was to become the Navy Base. Of the 474 acres (192 ha) originally acquired, 367 had been the old Jamestown Exposition grounds. The military property was later expanded considerably. The former Virginian Railway coal piers, land, and an adjacent coal storage facility owned by Norfolk & Western Railway (which merged with the VGN in 1959) were added in the 1960s and 1970s. The base now includes over 4,000 acres (1,600 ha).

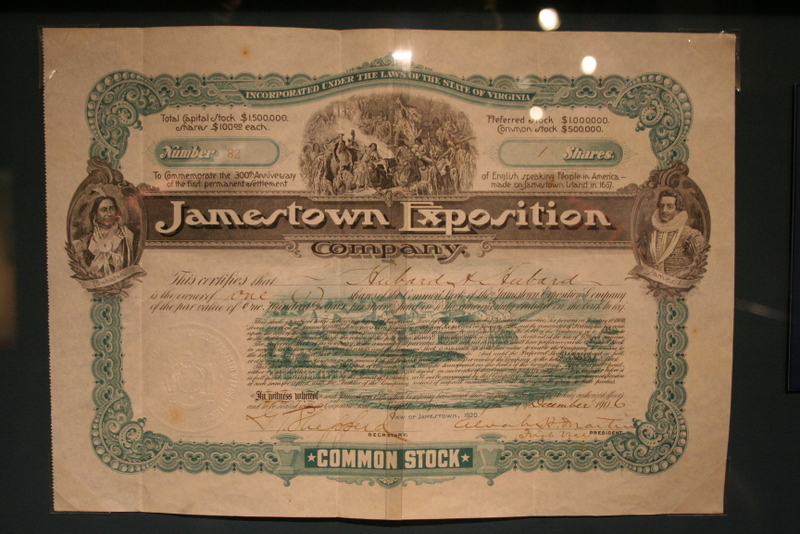
stock certificate issued to investors in the exposition

Some of the exposition buildings which were taken over by the Navy remain in use As of 2020, primarily as "Admiral's Row" for the Navy Base. Thirteen of the state houses can still be seen on Dillingham Boulevard at the Naval Station Norfolk, on what has been called "Admiral's Row." The Pennsylvania House, which through the first part of the century served as the Officer's Club, later served as the Hampton Roads Naval Museum for many years until it was relocated in 1994 to Nauticus on the harbor in Norfolk. Other surviving state buildings on their original sites are the Georgia, Maryland, Missouri, North Dakota, Ohio, Virginia, and West Virginia House, as well as the Baker's Chocolate Company House. The remaining state buildings were moved in 1934, including the Delaware, Connecticut, New Hampshire, Michigan, North Carolina, Rhode Island, and Vermont buildings. The Illinois Building was relocated next to the North Dakota Building. The Kenneth L. Howard House at Dunn, North Carolina is a copy of the North Carolina building.

== See also ==
- Virginian Railway
- NS Norfolk
- Jamestown 2007
