= Kincaid-Howard House =

Historic house in Tennessee, United States

- U.S. National Register of Historic Places
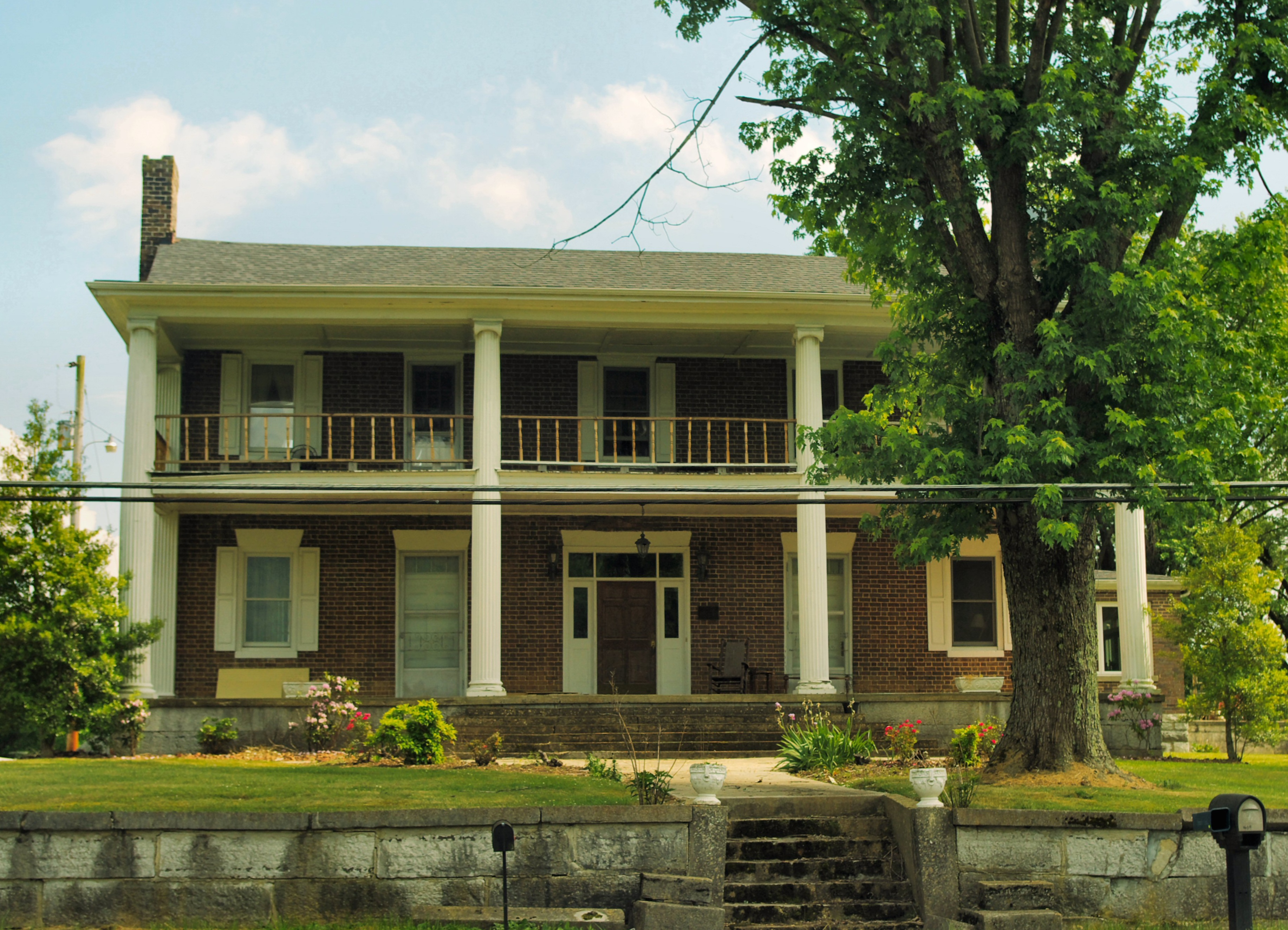
- The Kincaid-Howard House in 2015

- Location within Tennessee Location within the United States
- Location: TN 63, Fincastle, Tennessee
- Coordinates: 36°24′32″N 84°3′4″W
- Area: 9 acres (3.6 ha)
- Built: 1845
- Architectural style: Federal
- NRHP reference No.: 76001766
- Added to NRHP: March 16, 1976

The Kincaid-Howard House is a historic mansion in Fincastle, Tennessee, USA. It was designed in the Federal architectural style and completed in 1845. It was built for John Kincaid II, a planter and slaveholder in the Antebellum South. It has been listed on the National Register of Historic Places since March 16, 1976.
