= James Toon (cricketer) =

English cricketer (1916–1987)

James Harry Cecil Toon (17 January 1916 – 26 December 1987) was an English cricketer who played for Northamptonshire. He was born in Oundle and died in Wellingborough.

Toon made a single first-class appearance, during the 1946 season, against a Combined Services Eleven. As a bowler, he scored a duck in the first innings in which he batted, and 1 run in the second innings. He took four wickets overall with a best of 3–79. Northamptonshire lost the match by 8 wickets.
