= Angier, North Carolina =

- Town
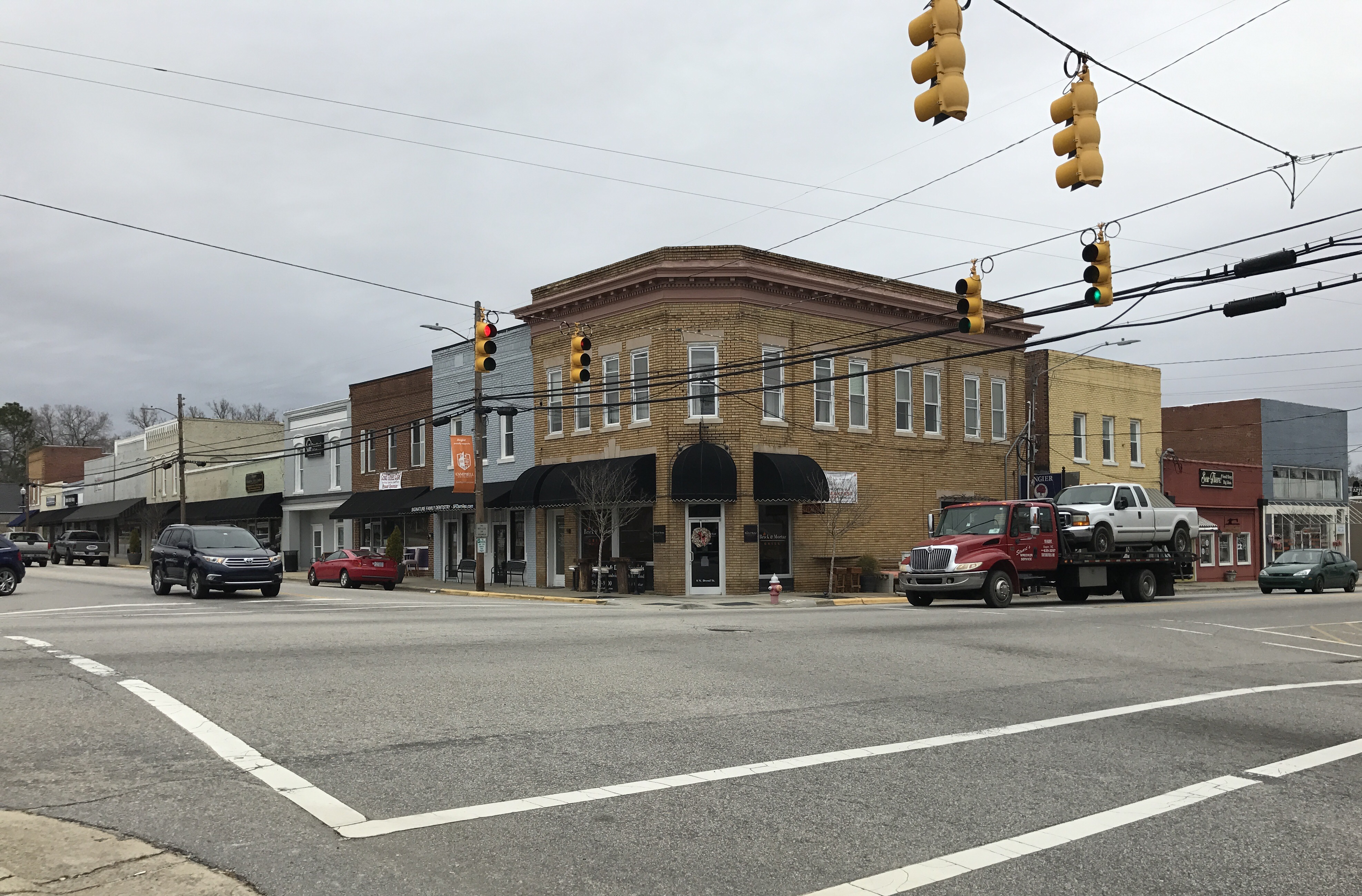

- Seal
- Motto: "Town of Crepe Myrtles"
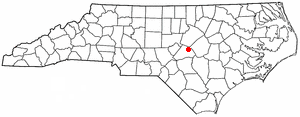
- Location in North Carolina
- Coordinates: 35°30′47″N 78°44′26″W
- Country: United States
- State: North Carolina
- Counties: Harnett, Wake

Government
  - Mayor: Bob Jusnes

Area
  - Total: 3.86 sq mi (10.00 km^{2})
  - Land: 3.83 sq mi (9.91 km^{2})
  - Water: 0.035 sq mi (0.09 km^{2})
- Elevation: 318 ft (97 m)

Population (2020)
  - Total: 5,265
  - Density: 1,376.3/sq mi (531.39/km^{2})
- Time zone: UTC-5 (EST)
  - Summer (DST): UTC-4 (EDT)
- ZIP code: 27501
- Area code: 919
- FIPS code: 37-01400
- GNIS feature ID: 2405152
- Website: www.angier.org

Angier (/ˈændʒɜːr/ AN-jur) is a town in the Black River Township of Harnett County, North Carolina, United States. As of the 2020 census, Angier had a population of 5,265. Angier is a part of the greater Raleigh–Durham–Cary Combined Statistical Area (CSA) as defined by the United States Census Bureau.

== History ==
The town was founded in the late 1880s and named for the Angier family of Durham, NC. The Williams Grove School was listed on the National Register of Historic Places in 1995.

== Geography ==
Angier is located in northern Harnett County. A small portion of the town is in Wake County to the north. North Carolina Highway 55 (Raleigh Street) passes through the center of town, leading north 7 miles (11 km) to Fuquay-Varina and south 14 miles (23 km) to Erwin. Raleigh, the state capital, is 22 miles (35 km) to the north via NC-55 and U.S. Route 401. North Carolina Highway 210 (Depot Street) crosses Highway 55 in the center of Angier, leading east 10 miles (16 km) to Interstate 40 and southwest 9 miles (14 km) to Lillington, the Harnett county seat.

According to the United States Census Bureau, the town of Angier has a total area of 2.9 square miles (7.6 km^{2}), of which 2.9 square miles (7.5 km^{2}) are land and 0.04 square miles (0.1 km^{2}), or 1.18%, are water.

== Demographics ==
Historical population
Census	Pop.	Note	%±
1910	221		—
1920	374		69.2%
1930	760		103.2%
1940	1,028		35.3%
1950	1,182		15.0%
1960	1,249		5.7%
1970	1,431		14.6%
1980	1,709		19.4%
1990	2,235		30.8%
2000	3,419		53.0%
2010	4,350		27.2%
2020	5,265		21.0%
2025 (est.)	9,410	▲	78.7%
U.S. Decennial Census

=== 2020 census ===
As of the 2020 census, Angier had a population of 5,265. The median age was 36.6 years. 26.1% of residents were under the age of 18 and 15.3% of residents were 65 years of age or older. For every 100 females there were 90.9 males, and for every 100 females age 18 and over there were 85.3 males age 18 and over.

12.3% of residents lived in urban areas, while 87.7% lived in rural areas.

There were 2,025 households in Angier and 1,429 families residing in the town, of which 37.3% had children under the age of 18 living in them. Of all households, 43.4% were married-couple households, 15.9% were households with a male householder and no spouse or partner present, and 33.7% were households with a female householder and no spouse or partner present. About 27.4% of all households were made up of individuals and 12.1% had someone living alone who was 65 years of age or older.

There were 2,162 housing units, of which 6.3% were vacant. The homeowner vacancy rate was 1.8% and the rental vacancy rate was 6.8%.

Angier racial composition
Race	Number	Percentage
White (non-Hispanic)	2,845	54.04%
Black or African American (non-Hispanic)	1,005	19.09%
Native American	10	0.19%
Asian	39	0.74%
Other/Mixed	230	4.37%
Hispanic or Latino	1,136	21.58%

=== 2000 census ===
As of the census of 2000, there were 3,419 people, 1,356 households, and 870 families residing in the town. The population density was 1,493.7 inhabitants per square mile (576.7/km^{2}). There were 1,478 housing units at an average density of 645.7 per square mile (249.3/km^{2}). The racial makeup of the town was 67.42% White, 23.37% African American, 0.41% Native American, 0.94% Asian, 0.03% Pacific Islander, 6.23% from other races, and 1.61% from two or more races. Hispanic or Latino of any race were 12.17% of the population.

There were 1,356 households, out of which 31.8% had children under the age of 18 living with them, 43.2% were married couples living together, 16.7% had a female householder with no husband present, and 35.8% were non-families. 28.3% of all households were made up of individuals, and 10.0% had someone living alone who was 65 years of age or older. The average household size was 2.46 and the average family size was 3.00.

In the town, the population was spread out, with 25.4% under the age of 18, 10.3% from 18 to 24, 32.5% from 25 to 44, 20.0% from 45 to 64, and 11.8% who were 65 years of age or older. The median age was 33 years. For every 100 females, there were 92.1 males. For every 100 females age 18 and over, there were 89.0 males.

The median income for a household in the town was $33,849, and the median income for a family was $43,784. Males had a median income of $30,215 versus $26,028 for females. The per capita income for the town was $15,985. About 10.6% of families and 16.3% of the population were below the poverty line, including 14.4% of those under age 18 and 30.4% of those age 65 or over.

== Education ==
- Carolina Charter Academy
- McGee's Crossroads Elementary School
- Angier Elementary School
- North Harnett Primary School
- Harnett Central Middle School
- Harnett Central High School

== Culture ==
Angier annually hosts the "Crepe Myrtle Festival", which attracts approximately 20,000 visitors. The town calls itself "The Town of Crepe Myrtles". Each summer Angier draws a crowd of motorcyclists and bike enthusiasts from across the region to downtown Angier to enjoy the sights, sounds and tastes of its annual Bike Fest event. The family-friendly event features live music, a bike show, a poker-run fund-raiser, exhibits and fun for people of all ages.

Angier lies along the "Art Road and Farm Trail" through Bladen, Cumberland, Harnett, Johnston and Robeson counties.

== Notable persons ==
- Franklin Dupree, federal judge
- Rhoda Griffis, actress
- Frazier Glenn Miller Jr., mass murderer
- Stephanie Patrick, YouTuber
- Caitlan Boardman, Food and Wine Expert
