= Williams Grove School =

Historic school building in North Carolina, United States

- U.S. National Register of Historic Places
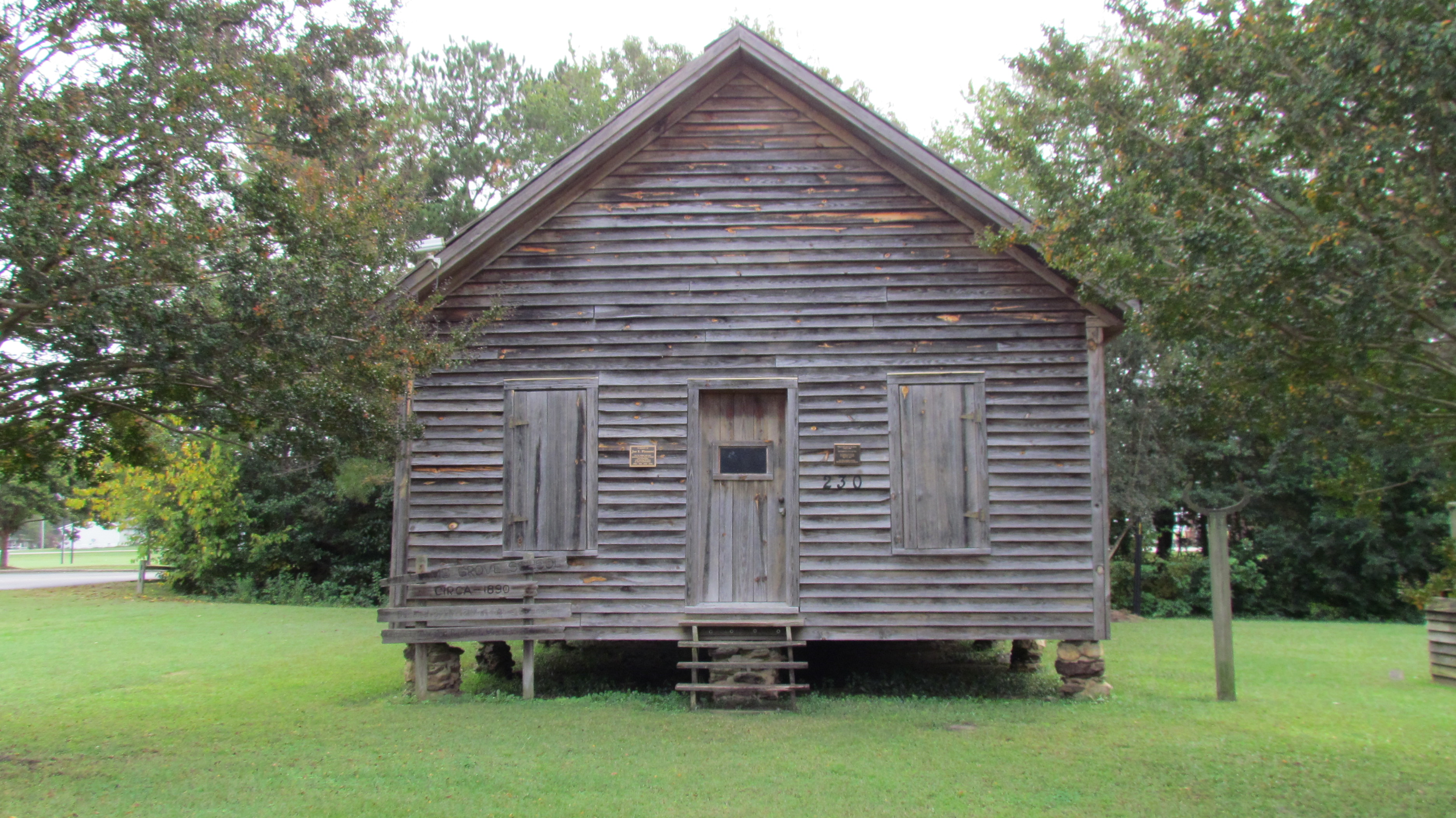

- Location within North Carolina Location within the United States
- Location: E. Depot St. N side, between Hickory and Willow Sts., Angier, North Carolina
- Coordinates: 35°30′27″N 78°44′6″W
- Area: less than one acre
- Built: 1892
- Architectural style: Front Gable one-room school
- NRHP reference No.: 95000659
- Added to NRHP: May 26, 1995

Williams Grove School is a historic one-room school located at Angier, Harnett County, North Carolina. It was built in 1892, and is a one-room frame front gable building. It measures 30 feet, 4 inches long, by 22 feet, 4 inches wide. It was moved to its present site in 1975 and subsequently restored as a museum.

It was listed on the National Register of Historic Places in 1995.
