= Horatio N. Howard House =

- U.S. National Register of Historic Places
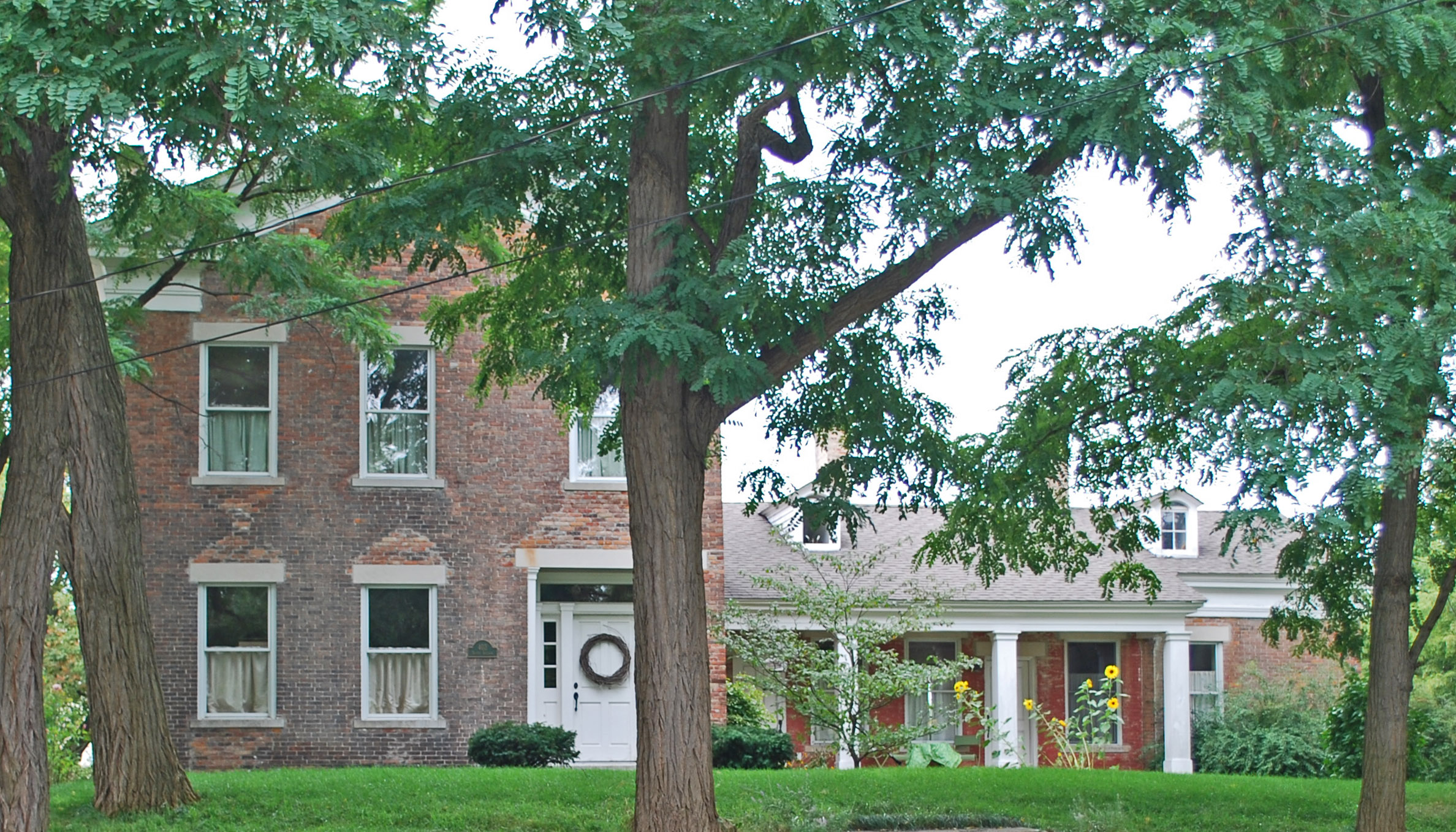
- Interactive map
- Location: 403 N. Saginaw, Pontiac, Michigan
- Coordinates: 42°38′50″N 83°17′41″W
- Area: less than one acre
- Built: 1850
- Architectural style: Greek Revival
- NRHP reference No.: 84000545
- Added to NRHP: December 27, 1984

The Horatio N. Howard House is a single-family house located at 403 North Saginaw in Pontiac, Michigan. It was listed on the National Register of Historic Places in 1984.

== History ==
Horatio N. Howard, moved to Pontiac from Genesee, New York, in 1829 to open a general store. However, in 1832–1833 he purchased a large industrial property, which included a flour mill, a woolen factory, and a trip-hammer shop. He ran the business until 1845, when he sold two-thirds interest to A.A. Lull and Albert F. Draper. Howard sold the remaining interest two years later. Horatio Howard also had additional business interests in Pontiac, including a distillery and the construction of a mill dam, race, and machine shop.

In 1849, Howard purchased the property on which this house sits; the house itself was likely built soon afterward. The Howard family owned the house until the 1870s. In 1887, it was purchased by Melvin D. Sly, who was born in Oakland County and was a member of the dry goods firm of J.S. Stockwell and Company. Sly owned the house until 1906.

== Description ==
The Horatio N. Howard House is a two-story, end-gable, red brick Greek Revival house, with a one-and-one-half-story flank-gable wing. The house sits on a stone foundation. The main portion of the house has a low pitch roof with classical cornices with returns. The main facade contains a main entrance at one end, set into a recessed porch with fluted columns. The entrance is flanked by pilasters, and has sidelights and a transom. The side wing also has a low pitch roof with classical cornices with returns, and has a porch stretched across most of the front.

The interior of the house contains a main staircase against one, with a hall leading to a pair of parlors connected by a large, segmental arch-head doorway. Each parlor contains a fireplace. The wing contains a modern kitchen, bathroom, and a separate apartment. The second floor is an L-plan, with three rooms.

== See also ==
- National Register of Historic Places listings in Oakland County, Michigan
