= John W. Howard House and Outbuildings =

- U.S. National Register of Historic Places
- Alabama Register of Landmarks and Heritage
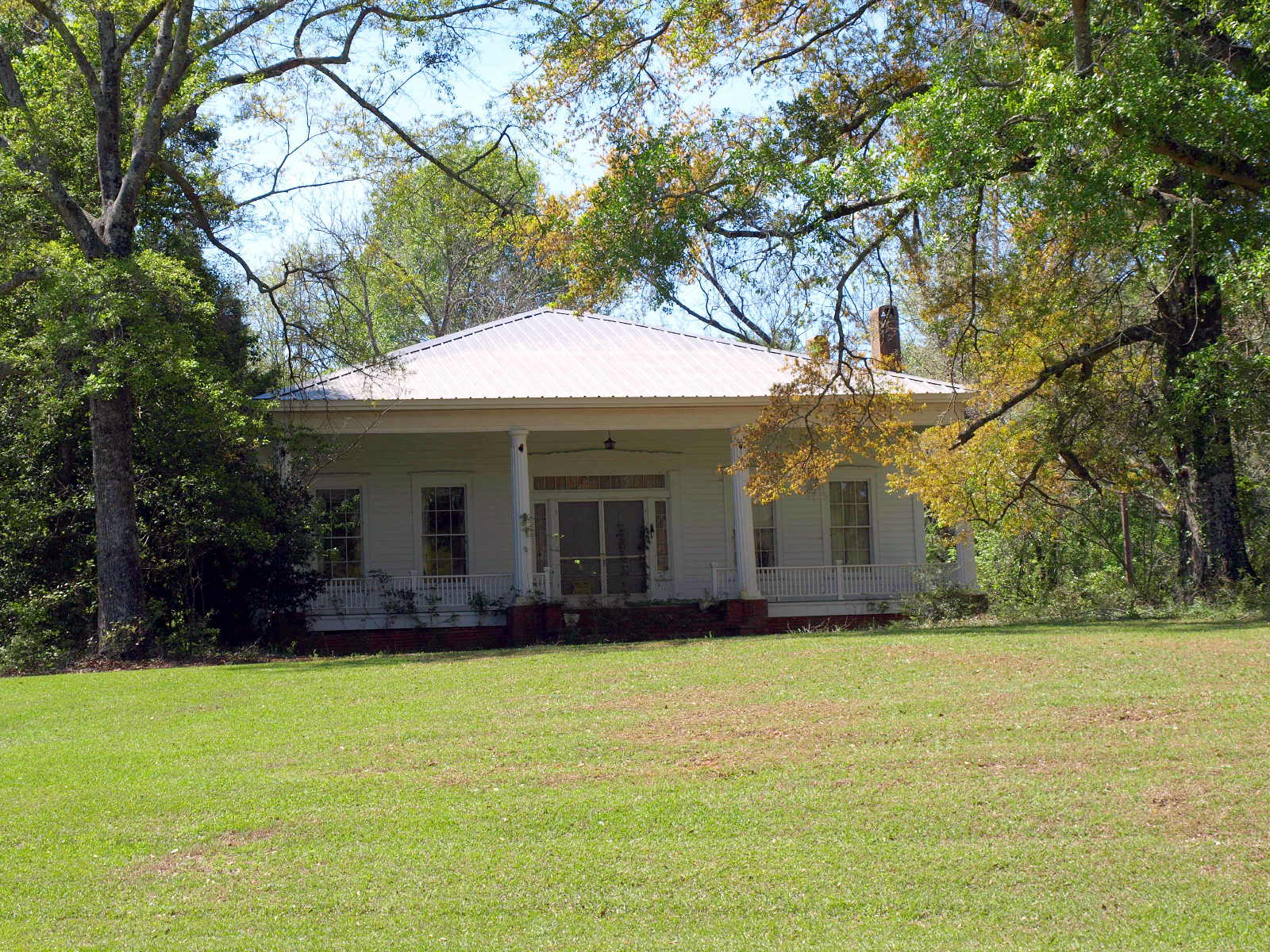
- The house in April 2015
- Interactive map of John W. Howard House and Outbuildings
- Location: State Route 10, near Greenville, Alabama
- Built: circa 1860
- Architectural style: Greek Revival
- NRHP reference No.: 92001090

Significant dates
- Added to NRHP: September 4, 1992
- Designated ARLH: September 2, 1982

The John W. Howard House is a historic residence near Greenville, Alabama, United States. It was built around 1860 by planter John W. Howard. While much of the land was sold off and used for timber, Howard's family continued to occupy the house at least through 1992. The house is a one-story, Greek Revival structure with an inset front porch. The façade is five bays wide, and the central entrance has double doors with multi-light sidelights and transom. The interior is a triple-pile center-hall plan. Outbuildings include a frame barn, a two-room detached kitchen, and the family cemetery.

The house was listed on the Alabama Register of Landmarks and Heritage in 1982 and the National Register of Historic Places in 1992.
