= John A. McKay House and Manufacturing Company =

Historic buildings in North Carolina, United States

- U.S. National Register of Historic Places
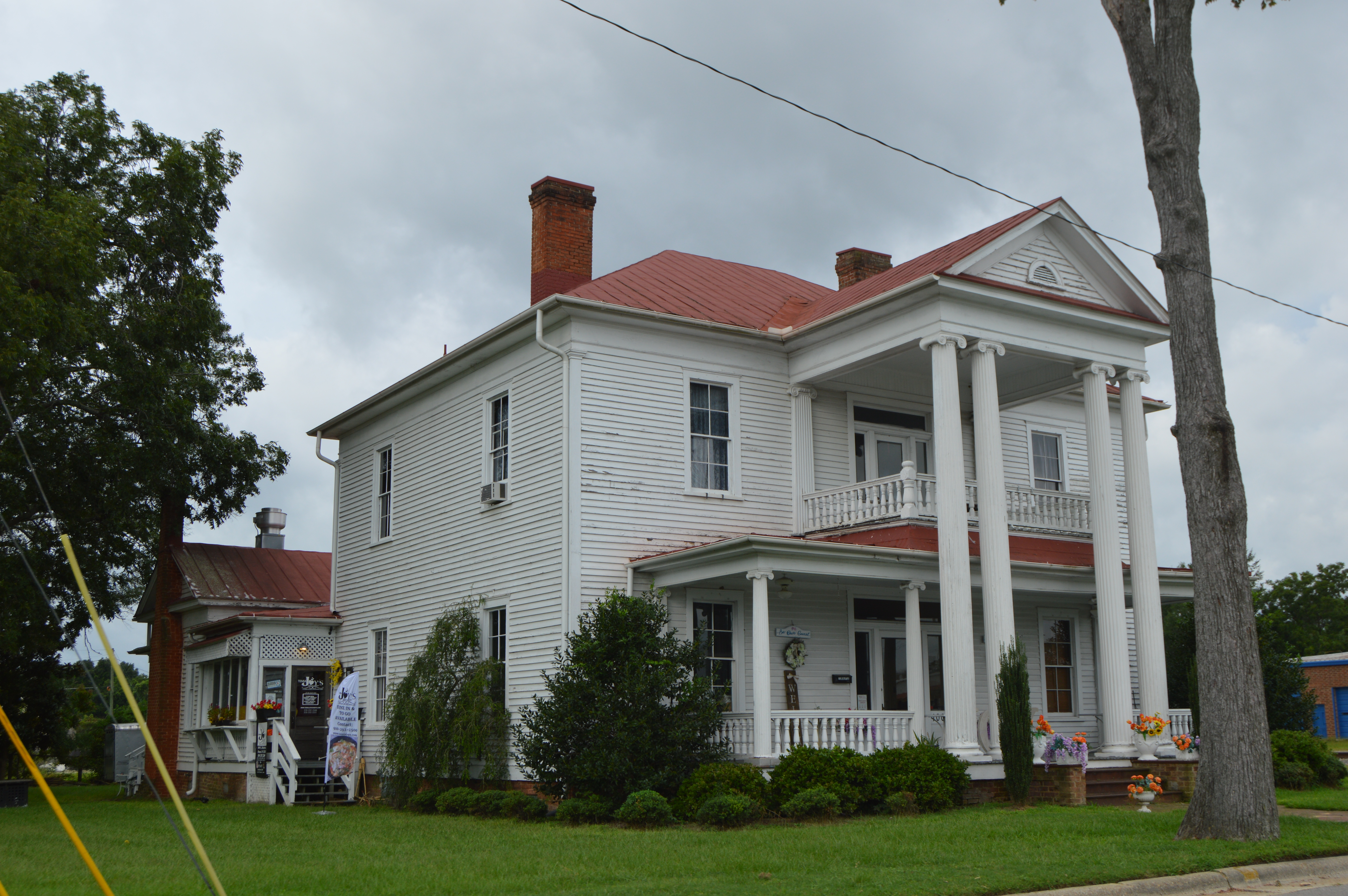
- Front and eastern side

- Location within North Carolina Location within the United States
- Location: 100 E. Divine St., Dunn, North Carolina
- Coordinates: 35°18′20″N 78°36′46″W
- Area: 3 acres (1.2 ha)
- Built: c. 1840, 1903, 1910, c. 1925, c. 1935
- Architectural style: Greek Revival
- NRHP reference No.: 86000739
- Added to NRHP: April 10, 1986

John A. McKay House and Manufacturing Company is a historic home and factory complex located at Dunn, Harnett County, North Carolina. The house was built about 1840, and is a two-story, double pile, Greek Revival style frame dwelling. It features a full-facade, one-story porch and two-story, portico. Associated with the house are a barn, later remodeled with garage doors, a smokehouse, a storage/wash house, and fence. The main factory building was built in 1903, and is a two-story U-shaped building, with a two-story shed, gable roofed ell, and another ell. Other contributing factory buildings are an office (1937), two privies, McKay Manufacturing Company building (1910), trailer assembly room (c. 1930), steel house (1910), foundry (1910), cleaning rooms (1910), wood storage building (1935), boiler room (c. 1925), pattern room (c. 1925), and flask shop (1910).

It was listed on the National Register of Historic Places in 1986.
