= Howard House (Seattle) =

Coordinates: 47.60245°N 122.332834°W

Howard House was a contemporary art gallery located in the historic Pioneer Square District in Downtown Seattle. From its inception in 1997 to its closing on June 12, 2010, the gallery fostered the careers of several local, national and international artists. Billy Howard, the gallery's owner, cited slow business as the basis for the decision.

Gallerist Billy Howard has been credited with introducing the Seattle art scene to the concept of the alternative space and has championed artist-run spaces. He first began Howard House by hosting performances and site-specific art works in his Capitol Hill home, inviting visitors to see works installed in his stairwell, dining room and bedroom. In an interview with art critic Jen Graves of The Stranger, the gallery's owner said that he will continue to work with artists on a projects basis.
