= James Toon (American football) =

American gridiron football player and coach (1938–2011)

Biographical details
- Born: November 12, 1938; Dunn, North Carolina, U.S.
- Died: June 4, 2011 (aged 72)

Playing career
- 1958–1961: North Carolina A&T
- 1960: Edmonton Eskimos
- 1961–1962: Louisville Raiders
- 1963–1966: Jersey Giants/Jets
- 1967–1968: Westchester Bulls
- 1969–1970: Long Island Bulls
- Positions: Defensive end, fullback

Coaching career (HC unless noted)
- ?: North Carolina A&T (assistant)
- 1997–1999: Fayetteville State

Head coaching record
- Overall: 10–22

James Allen Toon (November 12, 1938 – June 4, 2011) was an American gridiron football player and coach. He served as the head football coach at Fayetteville State University from 1997 to 1999, compiling a record of 10–22.

== Head coaching record ==
Year	Team	Overall	Conference	Standing	Bowl/playoffs
Fayetteville State Broncos (Central Intercollegiate Athletic Association) (1997–1999)
1997	Fayetteville State	4–7	3–4	6th	
1998	Fayetteville State	5–5	4–3	T–3rd	
1999	Fayetteville State	1–10	1–6	T–7th	
Fayetteville State:		10–22	8–13		
Total:		10–22			
