= Howard Homestead =

Historic house in New York, United States

- U.S. National Register of Historic Places
- Location within New York Location within the United States
- Location: McGuire School Rd., Duanesburg, New York
- Coordinates: 42°46′39″N 74°13′44″W
- Area: 114.6 acres (46.4 ha)
- Built: c. 1825
- Architectural style: Greek Revival, Federal
- MPS: Duanesburg MRA
- NRHP reference No.: 84003220
- Added to NRHP: October 11, 1984

Howard Homestead is a historic home located at Duanesburg in Schenectady County, New York. It was built in the 1820s or early 1830s and is a one-story, clapboard sided rectangular frame residence on a partially exposed concrete basement. It is in a late Federal / early Greek Revival style. It has a gable roof with returns and a three bay, side hall configuration.

The property was covered in a 1984 study of Duanesburg historical resources. It was listed on the National Register of Historic Places in 1984.
