= Erwin Commercial Historic District =

Historic district in North Carolina, United States

- U.S. National Register of Historic Places
- U.S. Historic district
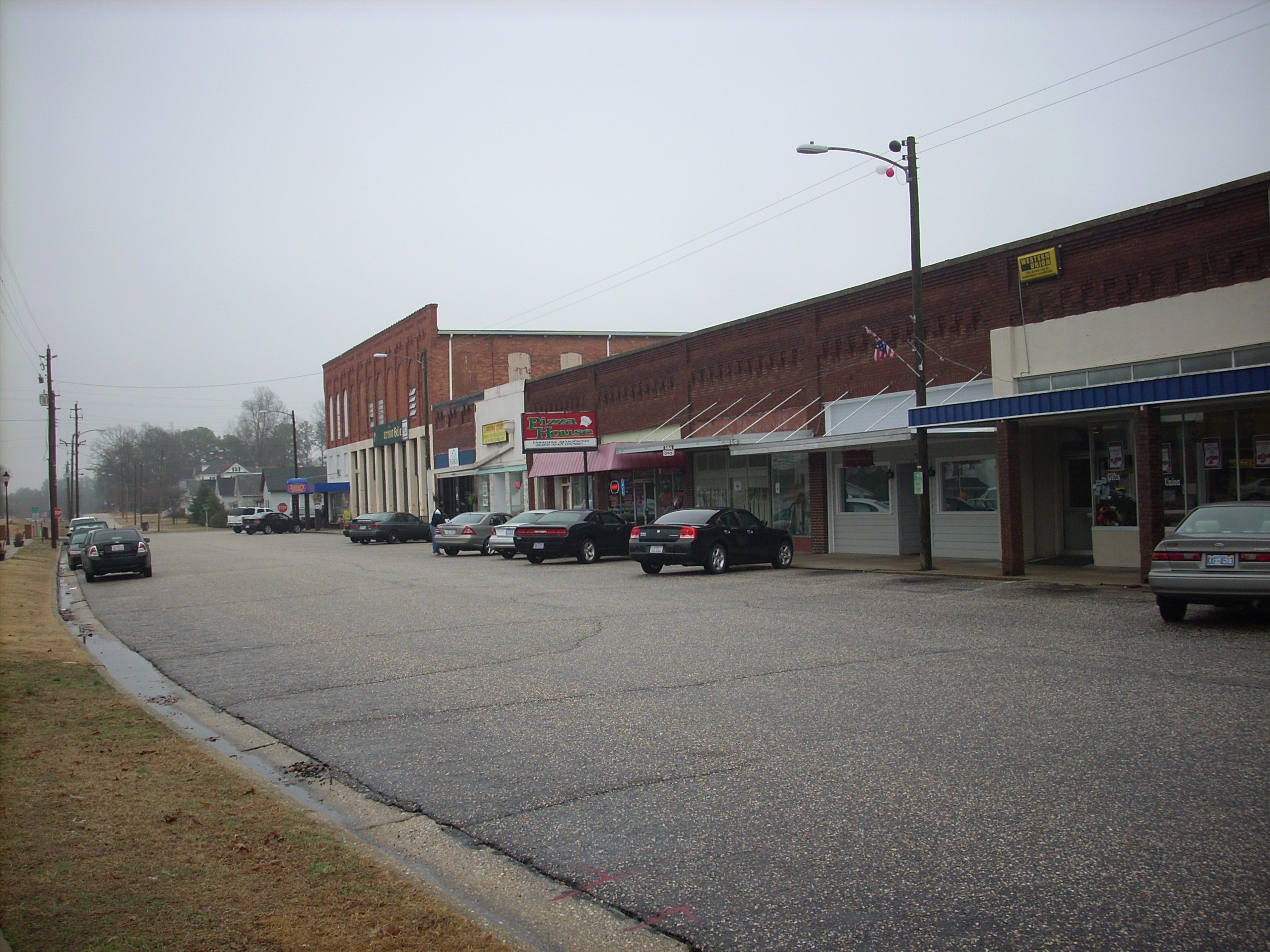
- East H Street

- Location within North Carolina Location within the United States
- Location: 100 Denim Drive, 101-127 E. H & 103-111 S. 13th Sts., Erwin, North Carolina
- Coordinates: 35°19′39″N 78°40′33″W
- Area: 2 acres (0.81 ha)
- Built: 1903
- Architectural style: Italianate, Modern
- NRHP reference No.: 15000182
- Added to NRHP: April 27, 2015

The Erwin Commercial Historic District encompasses a cluster of historic commercial buildings at the center of Erwin, North Carolina. It includes all of the buildings on the south side of East H Street between South 12th and 13th Streets, all on the east side of South 13th Street between East H and Denim Drive, and one building facing Denim Drive just east of South 13th. The buildings are mostly one and two-story brick structures, built early in the 20th century, with modest Italianate design elements. The Denim Drive property is a Modernist gas station built about 1962.

The district was listed on the National Register of Historic Places in 2015.
