= Fincastle, Tennessee =

- Census-designated place
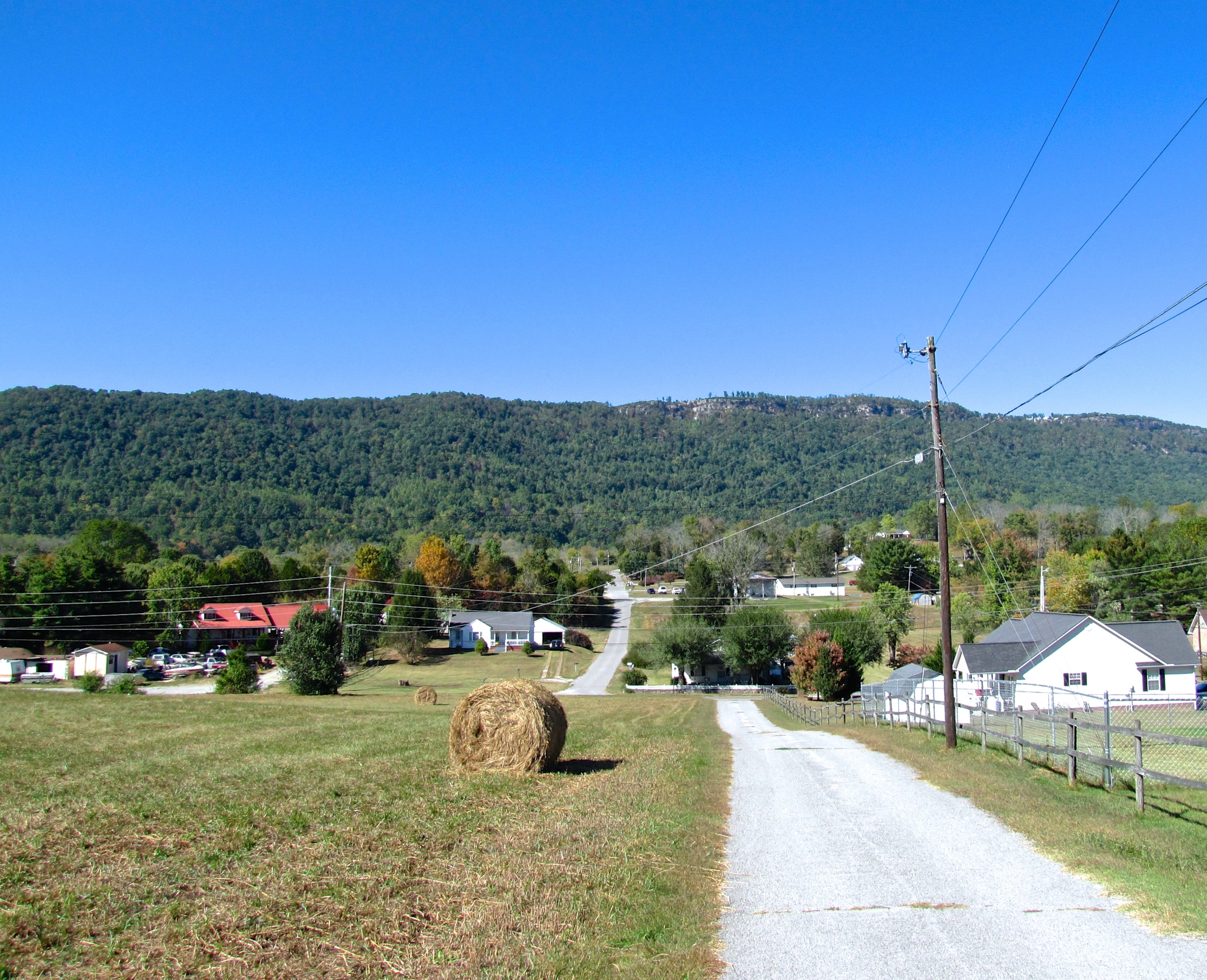
- Houses in Fincastle

- Location within Tennessee
- Coordinates: 36°24′35″N 84°02′52″W
- Country: United States
- State: Tennessee
- County: Campbell

Area
  - Total: 3.65 sq mi (9.46 km^{2})
  - Land: 3.65 sq mi (9.46 km^{2})
  - Water: 0 sq mi (0.00 km^{2})
- Elevation: 1,129 ft (344 m)

Population (2020)
  - Total: 1,611
  - Density: 441.0/sq mi (170.28/km^{2})
- Time zone: UTC-5 (Eastern (EST))
  - Summer (DST): UTC-4 (EDT)
- ZIP code: 37766
- Area code: 423
- GNIS feature ID: 1284257

Fincastle is a census-designated place and unincorporated community in Campbell County, Tennessee, United States. Its population was 1,618 as of the 2010 census.

Once known as Glade Springs, Fincastle was later named for Fincastle, Virginia, which was the original home of many of its early settlers.

== Geography ==
Fincastle is located along State Route 63 northeast of LaFollette and southwest of Speedwell in the Powell Valley. Cumberland Mountain rises prominently to the north, and Norris Lake lies a few miles to the south.

== Demographics ==
Historical population
Census	Pop.	Note	%±
2010	1,618		—
2020	1,611		−0.4%
U.S. Decennial Census

=== 2020 census ===
Fincastle racial composition
Race	Number	Percentage
White (non-Hispanic)	1,535	95.28%
Black or African American (non-Hispanic)	5	0.31%
Native American	3	0.19%
Other/Mixed	52	3.23%
Hispanic or Latino	16	0.99%

As of the 2020 United States census, there were 1,611 people, 597 households, and 361 families residing in the CDP.
