= Harnett County Training School =

Historic buildings in North Carolina, United States

- U.S. National Register of Historic Places
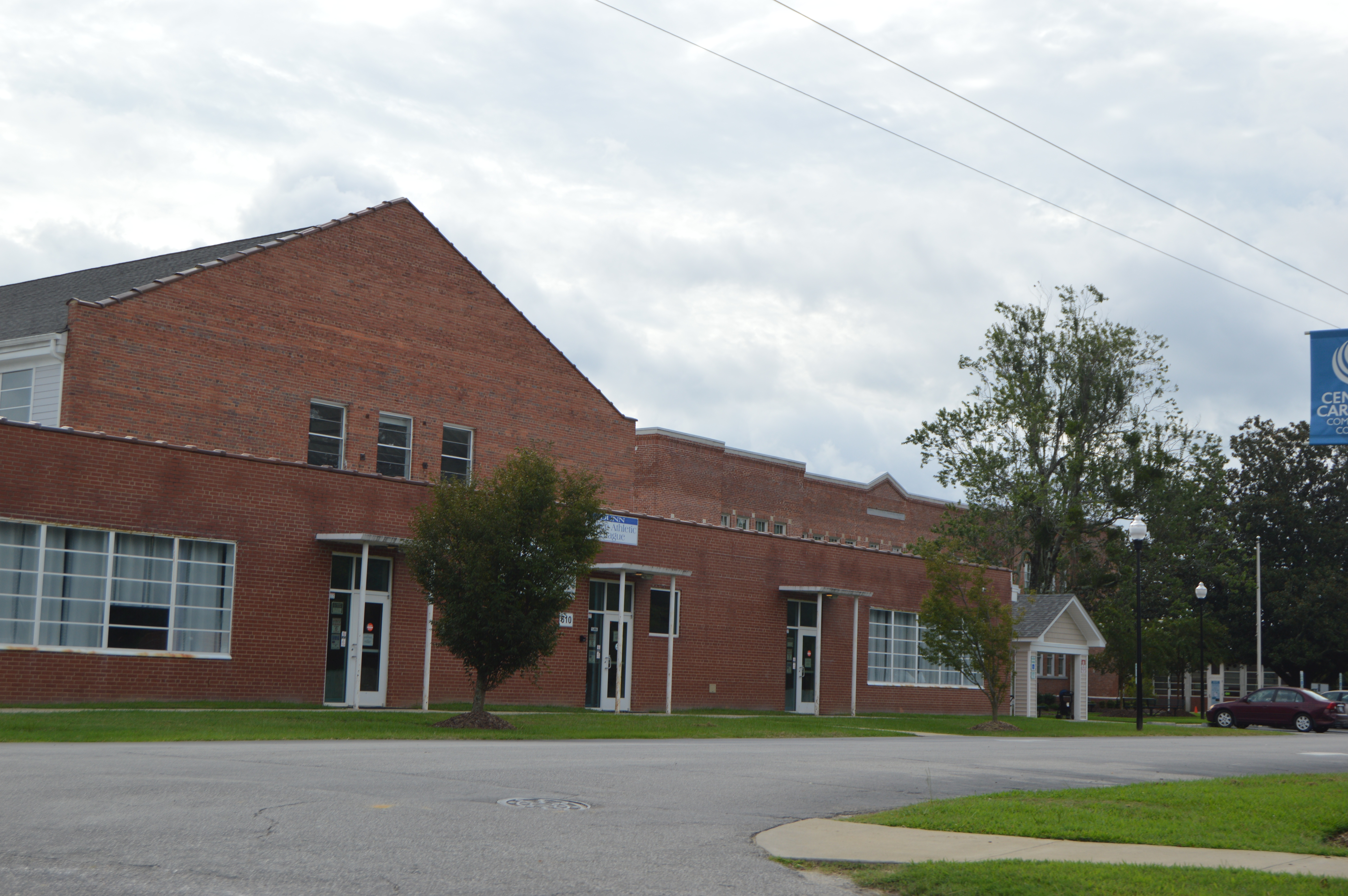

- Location within North Carolina Location within the United States
- Location: 610 E. Johnson St., Dunn, North Carolina
- Coordinates: 35°18′40″N 78°36′04″W
- Area: 5.33 acres (2.16 ha)
- Built: 1922-1956
- Built by: Player Realty Construction Co.
- Architect: Boney, Leslie N.
- Architectural style: Colonial Revival, Modern Movement
- NRHP reference No.: 14000521
- Added to NRHP: August 20, 2014

Harnett County Training School (also known as Harnett High School) is a historic school complex for African-American students located at Dunn, Harnett County, North Carolina. The complex was built between 1922 and 1956, and consists of one two-story and five single-story brick buildings. They include a gable front combined Gymnasium/Auditorium (1948); the two-story, 14 teacher, flat-roofed, Colonial Revival-style, Rosenwald-funded Harnett County Training School (1922); a detached brick boiler room (1950); two, one-story, flat-roofed Library and Office Building and Cafeteria buildings (1956); and a one-story, flat-roofed Rosenwald-funded classroom annex added in 1927, now designated the Education Building.

It was listed on the National Register of Historic Places in 2014.
