= Dunn Commercial Historic District =

Historic district in North Carolina, United States

- U.S. National Register of Historic Places
- U.S. Historic district
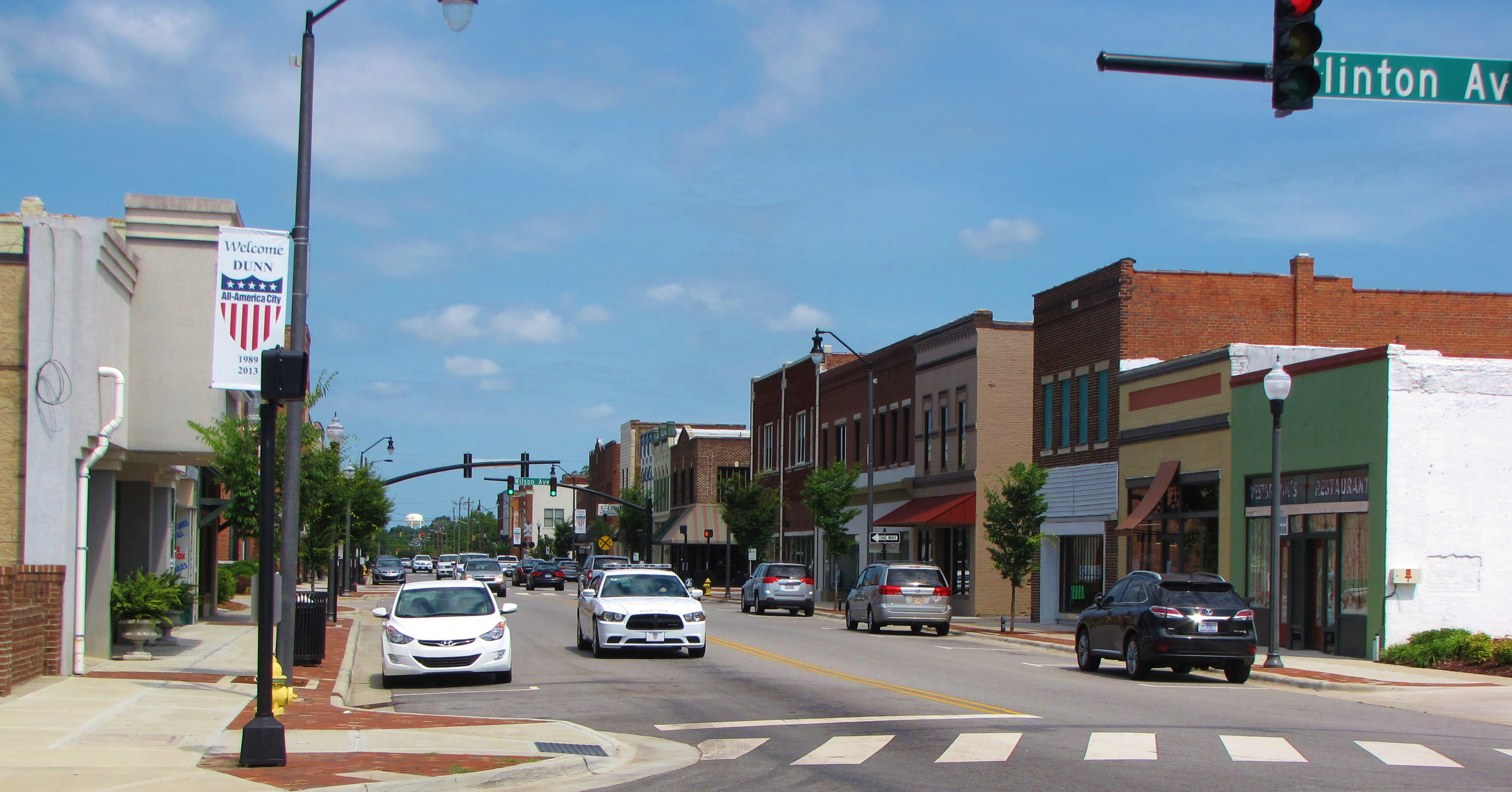
- Dunn Commercial Historic District, June 2014

- Location within North Carolina Location within the United States
- Location: Roughly Bounded by Harnett St., Cumberland St., Clinton Ave. & Fayetteville Ave., Dunn, North Carolina
- Coordinates: 35°18′30″N 78°36′34″W
- Area: 14 acres (5.7 ha)
- Built: 1886
- Built by: Jones Bros. & Co.
- Architectural style: Italianate, Early Commercial
- NRHP reference No.: 09000702
- Added to NRHP: September 9, 2009

Dunn Commercial Historic District is a national historic district located at Dunn, Harnett County, North Carolina. It encompasses 54 contributing buildings and one contributing structure in the central business district of Dunn. The predominantly commercial buildings were built between about 1900 and 1959, and includes notable examples of Italianate style architecture. Notable buildings include the Fitchett Drug Store (c. 1912), Cottondale Hotel (1924), Fleishman Brothers Company building (c. 1925), Prince's Department Store Building (c. 1930), Christo-Cola Bottling Works Building (c. 1913), White Way Theater Building (c. 1904), Johnson Cotton Company Building (c. 1925), and (former) Dunn Post Office (1937).

It was listed on the National Register of Historic Places in 2009.
