= Gen. William C. Lee House =

Historic house in North Carolina, United States

- U.S. National Register of Historic Places
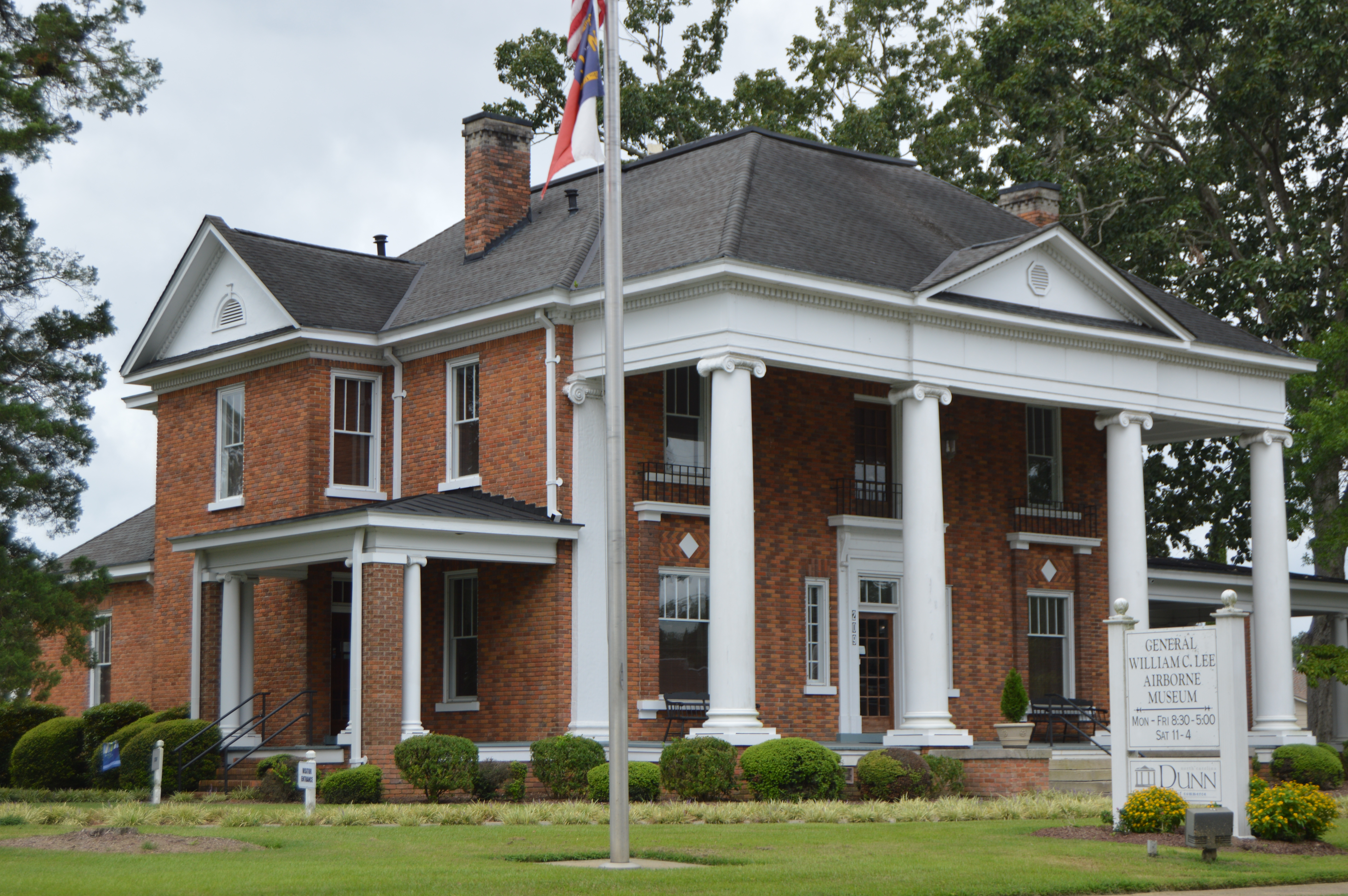
- Front and eastern side

- Location within North Carolina Location within the United States
- Location: 209 W. Divine St., Dunn, North Carolina
- Coordinates: 35°18′26″N 78°36′51″W
- Area: less than one acre
- Built: c. 1915
- Architectural style: Classical Revival
- NRHP reference No.: 83003968
- Added to NRHP: November 25, 1983

Gen. William C. Lee House is a historic home located at Dunn, Harnett County, North Carolina. It was built about 1915, and is a two-story, three-bay, double pile, Classical Revival-style brick veneer mansion with a hipped roof. It has one-story rear wings and features a full facade porch with monumental Tuscan order columns. It was the home of World War II General William C. Lee, whose wife acquired it in 1935. The house contains offices for the Dunn Area Chamber of Commerce and a museum memorial to the General.

It was listed on the National Register of Historic Places in 1983.
