= Kenneth L. Howard House =

Historic house in North Carolina, United States

- U.S. National Register of Historic Places
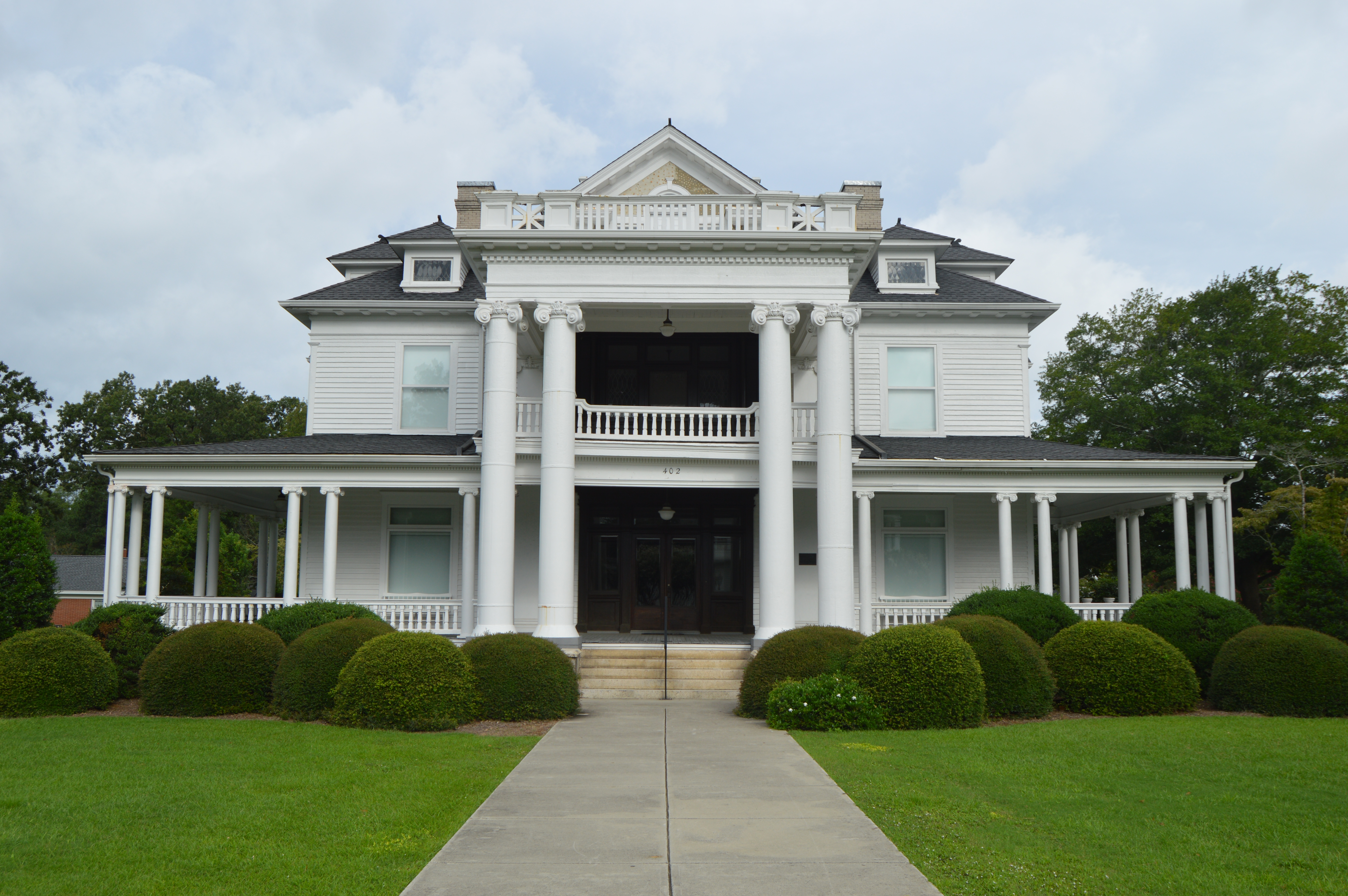
- Facade

- Location within North Carolina Location within the United States
- Location: 400 S. Layton Ave., Dunn, North Carolina
- Coordinates: 35°18′26″N 78°36′58″W
- Area: less than one acre
- Built: 1908
- Built by: J.E. Elliott & Brother
- Architect: Zimmerman & Lester
- Architectural style: Colonial Revival
- NRHP reference No.: 82003465
- Added to NRHP: August 19, 1982

Kenneth L. Howard House, also known as the Women's Club of Dunn, is a historic home located near Dunn, Harnett County, North Carolina. It was built in 1908–1909, and is a 2 1/2-story, three-bay, Colonial Revival style frame mansion. It has a high hipped roof crowned by a mock widow's walk and features a two-story free Ionic order portico and one-story wraparound porch. The house is a copy of the North Carolina Building at the Jamestown Exposition of 1907. In 1953 it was acquired as the headquarters of the Woman's Club.

It was listed on the National Register of Historic Places in 1982.
