= Dunn, North Carolina =

- City
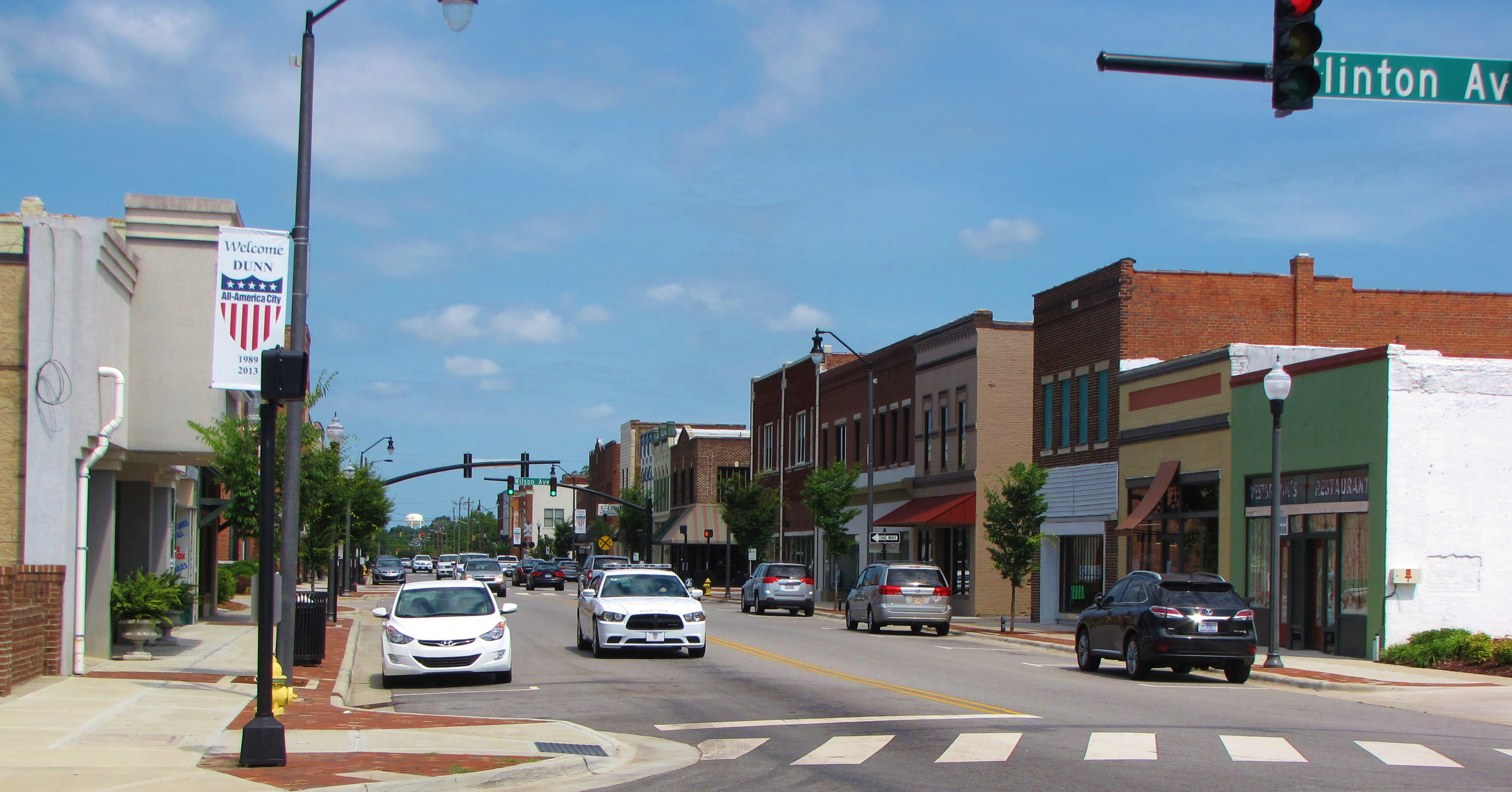
- Downtown Dunn

- Seal
- Motto: "Where community matters"
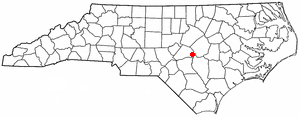
- Location of Dunn, North Carolina
- Coordinates: 35°18′41″N 78°36′46″W
- Country: United States
- State: North Carolina
- County: Harnett

Government
  - Mayor: William P. Elmore, Jr.

Area
  - Total: 6.99 sq mi (18.10 km^{2})
  - Land: 6.98 sq mi (18.08 km^{2})
  - Water: 0.0077 sq mi (0.02 km^{2})
- Elevation: 207 ft (63 m)

Population (2020)
  - Total: 8,446
  - Density: 1,209.9/sq mi (467.14/km^{2})
- Time zone: UTC−5 (Eastern (EST))
  - Summer (DST): UTC−4 (EDT)
- ZIP codes: 28334-28335
- Area codes: 910, 472
- FIPS code: 37-18320
- GNIS feature ID: 2403518
- Website: www.dunn-nc.org

Dunn is the most populous city of Harnett County, North Carolina, United States. The population was 8,446 at the 2020 census. It is, along with Harnett County, part of the Anderson Creek, NC Micropolitan Statistical Area, which is also included in the Raleigh-Durham-Cary, NC Combined Statistical Area.

== History ==
Originally called "Lucknow", what would become present-day Dunn was a sleepy hamlet compared to Averasborough, a much larger city on the Cape Fear River. After the Battle of Averasborough in 1865, most residents from Averasborough left for Lucknow, renamed "Dunn" in 1873.

The city of Dunn was incorporated on February 12, 1887, at which time it was a logging town and a turpentine distilling center. The name honors Bennett Dunn, who supervised the construction of the railway line between Wilson and Fayetteville.

The Dunn Commercial Historic District, Harnett County Training School, Kenneth L. Howard House, Lebanon, Gen. William C. Lee House, John A. McKay House and Manufacturing Company, and John E. Wilson House are listed on the National Register of Historic Places.

The city's former mayor, Oscar Harris, died when walking around the city. He was 80.

== Geography ==
Dunn is located in eastern Harnett County. It is bordered to the west by the town of Erwin. U.S. Route 301 (Clinton Avenue) passes through the center of Dunn, leading northeast 6 miles (10 km) to Benson and southwest 25 miles (40 km) to Fayetteville. U.S. Route 421 (Cumberland Street) crosses US-301 in the center of Dunn, leading northwest through Erwin 15 miles (24 km) to Lillington, the county seat, and southeast 28 miles (45 km) to Clinton. Interstate 95 passes through the eastern side of Dunn, with access from Exits 72 and 73. I-95 leads northeast 50 miles (80 km) to the Wilson area and southwest to the Fayetteville area.

According to the United States Census Bureau, the city of Dunn has a total area of 7.0 square miles (18.1 km^{2}), all land.

== Climate ==
According to the Köppen Climate Classification system, Dunn has a humid subtropical climate, abbreviated "Cfa" on climate maps. The hottest temperature recorded in Dunn was 108 °F (42.2 °C) on August 22, 1983, while the coldest temperature recorded was −4 °F (−20.0 °C) on January 21, 1985.

Climate data for Dunn, North Carolina, 1991–2020 normals, extremes 1962–present
Month	Jan	Feb	Mar	Apr	May	Jun	Jul	Aug	Sep	Oct	Nov	Dec	Year
Record high °F (°C)	80 (27)	88 (31)	89 (32)	94 (34)	99 (37)	104 (40)	105 (41)	108 (42)	100 (38)	96 (36)	86 (30)	80 (27)	108 (42)
Mean maximum °F (°C)	72.1 (22.3)	75.2 (24.0)	81.6 (27.6)	86.6 (30.3)	91.5 (33.1)	96.2 (35.7)	97.7 (36.5)	96.2 (35.7)	91.7 (33.2)	86.1 (30.1)	78.3 (25.7)	73.3 (22.9)	98.9 (37.2)
Mean daily maximum °F (°C)	54.5 (12.5)	58.3 (14.6)	65.5 (18.6)	75.1 (23.9)	81.9 (27.7)	88.8 (31.6)	91.8 (33.2)	89.9 (32.2)	84.6 (29.2)	75.4 (24.1)	65.7 (18.7)	57.5 (14.2)	74.1 (23.4)
Daily mean °F (°C)	43.1 (6.2)	46.0 (7.8)	52.8 (11.6)	61.9 (16.6)	69.9 (21.1)	77.8 (25.4)	81.3 (27.4)	79.6 (26.4)	74.0 (23.3)	62.9 (17.2)	52.6 (11.4)	46.0 (7.8)	62.3 (16.9)
Mean daily minimum °F (°C)	31.8 (−0.1)	33.7 (0.9)	40.0 (4.4)	48.7 (9.3)	57.9 (14.4)	66.8 (19.3)	70.8 (21.6)	69.3 (20.7)	63.3 (17.4)	50.5 (10.3)	39.6 (4.2)	34.6 (1.4)	50.6 (10.3)
Mean minimum °F (°C)	15.7 (−9.1)	20.2 (−6.6)	24.5 (−4.2)	33.3 (0.7)	43.9 (6.6)	55.4 (13.0)	62.7 (17.1)	60.5 (15.8)	51.0 (10.6)	35.0 (1.7)	25.1 (−3.8)	20.8 (−6.2)	14.1 (−9.9)
Record low °F (°C)	−4 (−20)	4 (−16)	10 (−12)	25 (−4)	33 (1)	43 (6)	52 (11)	47 (8)	37 (3)	21 (−6)	12 (−11)	1 (−17)	−4 (−20)
Average precipitation inches (mm)	3.63 (92)	3.23 (82)	3.68 (93)	3.57 (91)	3.83 (97)	4.97 (126)	5.93 (151)	5.46 (139)	5.50 (140)	3.17 (81)	3.56 (90)	3.57 (91)	50.10 (1,273)
Average snowfall inches (cm)	1.0 (2.5)	0.2 (0.51)	0.3 (0.76)	0.0 (0.0)	0.0 (0.0)	0.0 (0.0)	0.0 (0.0)	0.0 (0.0)	0.0 (0.0)	0.0 (0.0)	0.0 (0.0)	0.6 (1.5)	2.1 (5.27)
Average precipitation days (≥ 0.01 in)	10.0	8.7	9.7	8.4	9.4	9.3	11.4	10.5	8.3	7.2	7.7	10.2	110.8
Average snowy days (≥ 0.1 in)	0.3	0.2	0.0	0.0	0.0	0.0	0.0	0.0	0.0	0.0	0.0	0.2	0.7
Source 1: NOAA
Source 2: National Weather Service

== Demographics ==
Historical population
Census	Pop.	Note	%±
1890	419		—
1900	1,072		155.8%
1910	1,823		70.1%
1920	2,805		53.9%
1930	4,558		62.5%
1940	5,256		15.3%
1950	6,316		20.2%
1960	7,566		19.8%
1970	8,302		9.7%
1980	8,962		7.9%
1990	8,336		−7.0%
2000	9,196		10.3%
2010	9,263		0.7%
2020	8,446		−8.8%
U.S. Decennial Census; 2013 Estimate

=== Racial and ethnic composition ===
Dunn city, North Carolina – Racial and ethnic composition Note: the US Census treats Hispanic/Latino as an ethnic category. This table excludes Latinos from the racial categories and assigns them to a separate category. Hispanics/Latinos may be of any race.
Race / Ethnicity (NH = Non-Hispanic)	Pop 2000	Pop 2010	Pop 2020	% 2000	% 2010	% 2020
White alone (NH)	4,948	4,516	3,882	53.81%	48.75%	45.96%
Black or African American alone (NH)	3,787	3,909	3,319	41.18%	42.20%	39.30%
Native American or Alaska Native alone (NH)	87	86	76	0.95%	0.93%	0.90%
Asian alone (NH)	54	76	57	0.59%	0.82%	0.67%
Native Hawaiian or Pacific Islander alone (NH)	6	4	2	0.07%	0.04%	0.02%
Other race alone (NH)	13	13	28	0.14%	0.14%	0.33%
Mixed race or Multiracial (NH)	95	168	298	1.03%	1.81%	3.53%
Hispanic or Latino (any race)	206	491	784	2.24%	5.30%	9.28%
Total	9,196	9,263	8,446	100.00%	100.00%	100.00%

=== 2020 census ===
As of the 2020 census, Dunn had a population of 8,446. The median age was 44.3 years. 22.4% of residents were under the age of 18 and 24.2% were 65 years of age or older. For every 100 females, there were 81.5 males, and for every 100 females age 18 and over, there were 75.5 males age 18 and over.

99.3% of residents lived in urban areas, while 0.7% lived in rural areas.

There were 3,728 households in Dunn, including 2,284 family households. Of all households, 27.4% had children under the age of 18 living in them, 33.4% were married-couple households, 18.4% had a male householder with no spouse or partner present, and 43.9% had a female householder with no spouse or partner present. About 37.1% of all households were made up of individuals, and 20.8% had someone living alone who was 65 years of age or older.

There were 4,150 housing units, of which 10.2% were vacant. The homeowner vacancy rate was 2.9% and the rental vacancy rate was 7.7%.

=== 2000 census ===
As of the census of 2000, there were 9,196 people, 3,797 households, and 2,422 families residing in the city. The population density was 1,482.2 people per square mile (572.3 people/km^{2}). There were 4,100 housing units at an average density of 660.8 per square mile (255.1/km^{2}). The racial makeup of the city was 54.56% White, 41.21% African American, 0.97% Native American, 0.60% Asian, 0.07% Pacific Islander, 1.28% from other races, and 1.32% from two or more races. Hispanic or Latino of any race were 2.24% of the population.

There were 3,797 households, out of which 27.7% had children under the age of 18 living with them, 40.6% were married couples living together, 19.8% had a female householder with no husband present, and 36.2% were non-families. 32.7% of all households were made up of individuals, and 15.9% had someone living alone who was 65 years of age or older. The average household size was 2.35 and the average family size was 2.99.

In the city, the population was spread out, with 25.1% under the age of 18, 7.8% from 18 to 24, 25.3% from 25 to 44, 23.5% from 45 to 64, and 18.4% who were 65 years of age or older. The median age was 39 years. For every 100 females, there were 79.9 males. For every 100 females age 18 and over, there were 74.2 males.

The median income for a household in the city was $28,550, and the median income for a family was $39,521. Males had a median income of $31,029 versus $21,961 for females. The per capita income for the city was $19,178. About 19.6% of families and 23.5% of the population were below the poverty line, including 32.2% of those under age 18 and 19.2% of those age 65 or over.

== Education ==
Dunn is home to four schools. Dunn Elementary is for preschool through fifth grade; Dunn Middle School is for grades six through eight. Dunn's students then attend either Triton High School in nearby Erwin, or the Dunn campus of Harnett County Early College.

Dunn is also home to private religious schools, including Dream Big Christian Academy, Calvary Christian Academy, Heritage Bible College, and Foundations Bible College and Theological Seminary.

=== School paddling controversy ===
In December 1981, three students at Dunn High School were spanked with a wooden paddle by the assistant principal, Glenn Varney, as punishment for skipping school. School corporal punishment is legal in the state of North Carolina and was at the time permitted by the Harnett County school district. The paddling led the parents of one of the students, 17-year-old Shelly Gaspersohn, to file a $55,000 lawsuit against Varney and the school the following May (Gaspersohn v. Harnett County Board of Education), claiming that the punishment was too severe. When Shelley reached the age of 18 in October, she took over as direct plaintiff. In December 1983, following one week of testimony and 15 minutes of deliberation, the jury found for the defendants, and the plaintiff's subsequent appeal was ultimately rejected two years later by the Supreme Court of North Carolina. The trial was chronicled by psychologist Irwin Hyman, who was a witness for the plaintiff, in his 1990 book, Reading, Writing and the Hickory Stick.

On October 17, 1984, Shelly Gaspersohn recounted her experience before the U.S. Senate Subcommittee on Juvenile Justice, led by the subcommittee chairman, Arlen Specter of Pennsylvania. She stated that the county medical examiner who treated her for bruises and external hemorrhaging in the days after she was paddled filed a child abuse charge against Varney (a fact that was not allowed to be presented at trial), but that "there is no agency that can investigate a charge of child abuse against a public school teacher." Shelly's mother, Marlene Gaspersohn, also testified during the same session. When asked if she believed schools had the right to administer corporal punishment to students," Mrs. Gaspersohn replied, "I used to think that they had that right, but after experiencing the trauma that it can create, I have changed my mind completely about it."

Shelly Gaspersohn also called for the abolition of school paddling in a guest column for USA Today, published October 23, 1984.

In 2008 Harnett County changed its policy to ban corporal punishment in schools.

== Notable people ==
- Dorothy F. Bailey, civil leader
- Kevin Barnes, NFL cornerback
- Renee Ellmers, congresswoman
- Beth Finch, politician and businesswoman
- Algeania Freeman, academic administrator
- Oscar N. Harris, politician
- Cal Lampley, record producer and composer
- William C. Lee, Army general
- David R. Lewis, former member of the North Carolina House of Representatives
- Debbi Morgan, actress
- James Toon, gridiron football player and coach
- Clayton White, football coach and player
- Link Wray, musician
