= Little Duck Creek (South Hyco Creek tributary) =

Stream in North Carolina, USA

Little Duck Creek Tributary to South Hyco Creek
- Location of Little Duck Creek mouth Little Duck Creek (South Hyco Creek tributary) (the United States)

Location
- Country: United States
- State: North Carolina
- County: Person

Physical characteristics
- Source: Satterfield Creek divide
  - location: about 0.5 miles south-southwest of Olive Hill, North Carolina
  - coordinates: 36°24′41″N 079°03′11″W
  - elevation: 612 ft (187 m)
- Mouth: South Hyco Creek
  - location: about 1.5 miles west of Concord, North Carolina
  - coordinates: 36°26′57″N 079°05′35″W
  - elevation: 410 ft (120 m)
- Length: 3.04 mi (4.89 km)
- Basin size: 4.45 square miles (11.5 km^{2})
- Discharge
  - location: South Hyco Creek
  - average: 5.66 cu ft/s (0.160 m^{3}/s) at mouth with South Hyco Creek

Basin features
- Progression: South Hyco Creek → Hyco River → Dan River → Roanoke River → Albemarle Sound
- River system: Roanoke River
- Tributaries
  - left: unnamed tributaries
  - right: unnamed tributaries
- Bridges: Beaver Creek Parkway, Winstead Farm Road, Gardner Road, Concord Church Road

Little Duck Creek is a 3.04 mi (4.89 km) long 2nd order tributary to South Hyco Creek in Person County, North Carolina. Little Duck Creek joins South Hyco Creek within Hyco Lake.

== Variant names ==
According to the Geographic Names Information System, it has also been known historically as:

- Duck Creek

== Course ==
Little Duck Creek rises about 0.5 miles south-southwest of Olive Hill, North Carolina and then flows northwest to join South Hyco Creek about 1.5 miles southeast of Concord.

== Watershed ==
Little Duck Creek drains 4.45 square miles (11.5 km^{2}) of area, receives about 46.4 in/year of precipitation, has a wetness index of 398.38, and is about 44% forested.
