= Cub Creek =

Cub Creek may refer to:

- Cub Creek (Courtois Creek), a stream in Iron County, Missouri, United States
- Cub Creek (Osage River), a stream in Miller County, Missouri, United States
- Cub Creek (South Hyco Creek tributary), a stream in Person County, North Carolina, United States
- Cub Creek (Tennessee River tributary), a stream in Tennessee
