= Cobbs Creek (Hyco Creek tributary) =

Stream in North Carolina, USA

Cobbs Creek Tributary to Hyco Creek
- Location of Cobbs Creek mouth Cobbs Creek (Hyco Creek tributary) (the United States)

Location
- Country: United States
- State: North Carolina
- County: Person; Caswell

Physical characteristics
- Source: South Hyco Creek divide
  - location: pond about 0.5 miles southeast of Leasburg, North Carolina
  - coordinates: 36°22′59″N 079°08′34″W
  - elevation: 585 ft (178 m)
- Mouth: Hyco Creek
  - location: about 3 miles southeast of Semora, North Carolina
  - coordinates: 36°28′41″N 079°06′18″W
  - elevation: 410 ft (120 m)
- Length: 7.08 mi (11.39 km)
- Basin size: 11.76 square miles (30.5 km^{2})
- Discharge
  - location: Hyco Creek
  - average: 14.27 cu ft/s (0.404 m^{3}/s) at mouth with Hyco Creek

Basin features
- Progression: north and northeast
- River system: Roanoke River
- Tributaries
  - left: unnamed tributaries
  - right: unnamed tributaries
- Bridges: Old Durham Road, US 158, NC 57

Cobbs Creek is a 7.08 mi (11.39 km) long 2nd order tributary to Hyco Creek in Person County, North Carolina. Cobbs Creek joins Hyco Creek within Hyco Lake.

== Course ==
Cobbs Creek rises in a pond about 0.5 miles southeast of Leasburg, North Carolina and then flows north and northeast to join Hyco Creek about 3 miles southeast of Semora, North Carolina. Cobbs Creek briefly flows into Caswell County before turning back into Person County.

== Watershed ==
Cobbs Creek drains 11.76 square miles (30.5 km^{2}) of area, receives about 46.2 in/year of precipitation, has a wetness index of 406.62, and is about 70% forested.
