= Donaldson Creek (Mayo Creek tributary) =

Stream in North Carolina, USA

Donaldson Creek Tributary to Mayo Creek
- Location of Mayo Creek mouth Donaldson Creek (Mayo Creek tributary) (the United States)

Location
- Country: United States
- State: North Carolina
- County: Person

Physical characteristics
- Source: Crooked Creek divide
  - location: pond about 2 miles southeast of Triple Springs, North Carolina
  - coordinates: 36°27′16″N 078°49′54″W
  - elevation: 625 ft (191 m)
- Mouth: Mayo Creek
  - location: about 2 miles southwest of Triple Springs, North Carolina
  - coordinates: 36°27′25″N 078°52′36″W
  - elevation: 402 ft (123 m)
- Length: 4.14 mi (6.66 km)
- Basin size: 5.38 square miles (13.9 km^{2})
- Discharge
  - location: Mayo Creek
  - average: 6.87 cu ft/s (0.195 m^{3}/s) at mouth with Mayo Creek

Basin features
- Progression: Mayo Creek → Hyco River → Dan River → Roanoke River → Albemarle Sound
- River system: Roanoke River
- Tributaries
  - left: unnamed tributaties
  - right: unnamed tributaries
- Bridges: Lawson Chapel Church Road (x2)

Donaldson Creek is a 4.14-mile (6.66 km) long order tributary to Mayo Creek in Person County, North Carolina.

== Course ==
Donaldson Creek rises in a pond about 2 miles southeast of Triple Springs, North Carolina, and then flows northwest to join Mayo Creek about 2 miles southwest of Triple Springs.

== Watershed ==
Donaldson Creek drains 5.38 square miles (13.9 km^{2}) of area, receives about 46.4 in/year of precipitation, has a wetness index of 402.03, and is about 63% forested.
