= Bowes Branch =

Stream in Virginia, USA

Bowes Branch Tributary to Hyco River
- Location of Bowes Branch mouth Bowes Branch (the United States)

Location
- Country: United States
- State: Virginia; North Carolina
- County: Halifax (VA); Person (NC)

Physical characteristics
- Source: unnamed tributary to Mayo Creek divide
  - location: about 1 mile northeast of Bethel Hill, North Carolina
  - coordinates: 36°30′58″N 078°54′25″W
  - elevation: 550 ft (170 m)
- Mouth: Hyco River
  - location: about 2 miles east of Harmony, Virginia
  - coordinates: 36°33′35″N 078°55′57″W
  - elevation: 328 ft (100 m)
- Length: 3.68 mi (5.92 km)
- Basin size: 4.51 square miles (11.7 km^{2})
- Discharge
  - location: Hyco River
  - average: 5.75 cu ft/s (0.163 m^{3}/s) at mouth with Hyco River

Basin features
- Progression: Hyco River → Dan River → Roanoke River → Albemarle Sound
- River system: Roanoke River
- Tributaries
  - left: unnamed tributaries
  - right: unnamed tributaries
- Bridges: US 501

Bowes Branch is a 3.68 mi (5.92 km) long 2nd order tributary to the Hyco River in Halifax County, Virginia. This is the only stream of this name in the United States.

== Course ==
Bowes Branch rises about 0.25 miles northeast of Bethel Hill, North Carolina, and then flows generally north into Halifax County, Virginia to join the Hyco River about 2 east of Harmony.

== Watershed ==
Bowes Branch drains 4.51 square miles (11.7 km^{2}) of area, receives about 46.0 in/year of precipitation, has a wetness index of 368.69, and is about 73% forested.
