= Dry Creek (Hyco River tributary) =

Stream in Virginia, USA

Dry Creek Tributary to Hyco River
- Location of Dry Creek mouth Dry Creek (Hyco River tributary) (the United States)

Location
- Country: United States
- State: Virginia
- County: Halifax

Physical characteristics
- Source: Little Bluewing Creek divide
  - location: about 1.5 miles east-southeast of Mayo, Virginia
  - coordinates: 36°34′02″N 078°51′27″W
  - elevation: 462 ft (141 m)
- Mouth: Hyco River
  - location: about 3 miles southeast of Cluster Springs, Virginia
  - coordinates: 36°35′42″N 078°52′32″W
  - elevation: 322 ft (98 m)
- Length: 2.59 mi (4.17 km)
- Basin size: 2.91 square miles (7.5 km^{2})
- Discharge
  - location: Hyco River
  - average: 3.75 cu ft/s (0.106 m^{3}/s) at mouth with Hyco River

Basin features
- Progression: Hyco River → Dan River → Roanoke River → Albemarle Sound
- River system: Roanoke River
- Tributaries
  - left: unnamed tributaries
  - right: unnamed tributaries
- Bridges: none

Dry Creek is a 2.59 mi (4.17 km) long 2nd order tributary to the Hyco River in Halifax County, Virginia.

== Course ==
Dry Creek rises about 1.5 miles east-southeast of Mayo, Virginia, and then flows northwest to join the Hyco River about 3 miles southeast of Cluster Springs.

== Watershed ==
Dry Creek drains 2.91 square miles (7.5 km^{2}) of area, receives about 45.8 in/year of precipitation, has a wetness index of 381.54, and is about 59% forested.
