= Cane Creek (Hyco River tributary) =

Stream in North Carolina, US

Cane Creek Tributary to Hyco River
- Location of Cane Creek mouth Cane Creek (Hyco River tributary) (the United States)

Location
- Country: United States
- State: North Carolina
- County: Person; Caswell

Physical characteristics
- Source: Country Line Creek divide
  - location: about 0.25 miles southeast of Semora, North Carolina
  - coordinates: 36°29′37″N 079°08′39″W
  - elevation: 555 ft (169 m)
- Mouth: Hyco River
  - location: about 1.5 miles west of McGehees Mill, North Carolina in Hyco Lake
  - coordinates: 36°30′43″N 079°03′55″W
  - elevation: 410 ft (120 m)
- Length: 5.10 mi (8.21 km)
- Basin size: 8.25 square miles (21.4 km^{2})
- Discharge
  - location: Hyco River
  - average: 10.19 cu ft/s (0.289 m^{3}/s) at mouth with Hyco River

Basin features
- Progression: northeast
- River system: Roanoke River
- Tributaries
  - left: unnamed tributaties
  - right: unnamed tributaries
- Bridges: Semora Road, Jeff Road

Cane Creek is a 5.10 mi (8.21 km) long 3rd order tributary to the Hyco River in Person County, North Carolina. Cane Creek joins the Hyco River within Hyco Lake.

== Variant names ==
According to the Geographic Names Information System, it has also been known historically as:

- Cain Creek

== Course ==
Cane Creek rises in a pond about 0.25 miles southeast of Semora, North Carolina in Caswell County, and then flows northeast into Person County to join the Hyco River about 1.5 miles west of McGehee Mills.

== Watershed ==
Cane Creek drains 8.25 square miles (21.4 km^{2}) of area, receives about 46.0 in/year of precipitation, has a wetness index of 411.27, and is about 54% forested.
