= Pensions Branch =

Stream in Virginia, USA

Pensions Branch Tributary to Hyco River
- Location of Pensions Branch mouth Pensions Branch (the United States)

Location
- Country: United States
- State: Virginia
- County: Halifax

Physical characteristics
- Source: Larkin Branch divide
  - location: pond about 1 mile north of Larrys Store, Virginia
  - coordinates: 36°37′01″N 078°47′42″W
  - elevation: 395 ft (120 m)
- Mouth: Hyco River
  - location: about 2 miles south-southeast of Omega, Virginia
  - coordinates: 36°38′29″N 078°47′39″W
  - elevation: 315 ft (96 m)
- Length: 2.58 mi (4.15 km)
- Basin size: 2.20 square miles (5.7 km^{2})
- Discharge
  - location: Hyco River
  - average: 2.85 cu ft/s (0.081 m^{3}/s) at mouth with Hyco River

Basin features
- Progression: Hyco River → Dan River → Roanoke River → Albemarle Sound
- River system: Roanoke River
- Tributaries
  - left: unnamed tributaries
  - right: unnamed tributaries
- Bridges: unnamed road

Pensions Branch is a 2.58 mi (4.15 km) long 1st order tributary to the Hyco River in Halifax County, Virginia. This is the only stream of this name in the United States.

== Course ==
Pensions Branch rises in a pond about 1 mile north of Larrys Store, Virginia and then flows generally north with curves to join the Hyco River about 2 miles south-southeast of Omega.

== Watershed ==
Pensions Branch drains 2.20 square miles (5.7 km^{2}) of area, receives about 45.6 in/year of precipitation, has a wetness index of 410.25, and is about 52% forested.

== See also ==
- List of rivers of Virginia
