= Flat Branch (Hyco River tributary) =

Stream in Virginia, USA

Flat Branch Tributary to Hyco River
- Location of Flat Branch mouth Flat Branch (Hyco River tributary) (the United States)

Location
- Country: United States
- State: Virginia
- County: Halifax

Physical characteristics
- Source: Morris Branch divide
  - location: about 1.5 miles west of Aarons Creek, Virginia
  - coordinates: 36°39′23″N 078°44′50″W
  - elevation: 398 ft (121 m)
- Mouth: Hyco River at John H. Kerr Reservoir
  - location: about 1 mile northwest of Aarons Creek, Virginia
  - coordinates: 36°40′23″N 078°44′27″W
  - elevation: 300 ft (91 m)
- Length: 1.11 mi (1.79 km)
- Basin size: 0.49 square miles (1.3 km^{2})
- Discharge
  - location: Hyco River
  - average: 0.66 cu ft/s (0.019 m^{3}/s) at mouth with Hyco River

Basin features
- Progression: Hyco River → Dan River → Roanoke River → Albemarle Sound
- River system: Roanoke River
- Tributaries
  - left: unnamed tributaries
  - right: unnamed tributaries
- Bridges: US 58

Flat Branch is a 1.11 mi (1.79 km) long 1st order tributary to the Hyco River in Halifax County, Virginia. Flat Branch joins Hyco River in John H. Kerr Reservoir (Buggs Island Reservoir in Virginia).

== Course ==
Flat Branch rises about 1.5 miles west of Aarons Creek, Virginia and then flows north-northeast to join the Hyco River in John H. Kerr Reservoir about 1 mile northwest of Aarons Creek.

== Watershed ==
Flat Branch drains 0.49 square miles (1.3 km^{2}) of area, receives about 45.4 in/year of precipitation, has a wetness index of 410.39, and is about 70% forested.

== See also ==
- List of rivers of Virginia
