= Panther Branch (Hyco Creek tributary) =

Stream in North Carolina, USA

Panther Branch Tributary to Hyco Creek
- Location of Panther Branch mouth Panther Branch (Hyco Creek tributary) (the United States)

Location
- Country: United States
- State: North Carolina
- County: Caswell

Physical characteristics
- Source: Sugartree Creek divide
  - location: Morgans Pond about 1 mile north of Prospect Hill, North Carolina
  - coordinates: 36°16′17″N 079°11′23″W
  - elevation: 698 ft (213 m)
- Mouth: Hyco Creek
  - location: about 1.5 miles west-southwest of Frogsboro, North Carolina
  - coordinates: 36°20′15″N 079°12′38″W
  - elevation: 462 ft (141 m)
- Length: 5.46 mi (8.79 km)
- Basin size: 5.62 square miles (14.6 km^{2})
- Discharge
  - location: Hyco Creek
  - average: 7.03 cu ft/s (0.199 m^{3}/s) at mouth with Hyco Creek

Basin features
- Progression: generally north
- River system: Roanoke River
- Tributaries
  - left: unnamed tributaries
  - right: unnamed tributaries
- Bridges: Ridgeville Road, Barnwell Road, Egypt Road, Innesbrook Way, John Oakley Road

Panther Branch is a 5.46 mi (8.79 km) long 2nd order tributary to Hyco Creek in Caswell County, North Carolina.

== Course ==
Panther Branch rises in Morgans Pond about 1 mile north of Prospect Hill, North Carolina, and then flows northerly to join Hyco Creek about 1.5 miles west-southwest of Frogsboro.

== Watershed ==
Panther Branch drains 5.62 square miles (14.6 km^{2}) of area, receives about 46.5 in/year of precipitation, has a topographic wetness index of 376.53, and is about 45% forested.
