= Crutchfield Branch (Mayo Creek tributary) =

Stream in Virginia, USA

Crutchfield Branch Tributary to Mayo Creek
- Location of Crutchfield Branch mouth Crutchfield Branch (Mayo Creek tributary) (the United States)

Location
- Country: United States
- State: Virginia; North Carolina
- County: Halifax (VA); Person (NC)

Physical characteristics
- Source: Mayo Creek divide
  - location: about 1.5 miles south of Mayo, Virginia
  - coordinates: 36°31′30″N 078°54′03″W
  - elevation: 521 ft (159 m)
- Mouth: Mayo Creek
  - location: about 2 miles northeast of Bethel Hill, North Carolina
  - coordinates: 36°33′01″N 078°52′51″W
  - elevation: 335 ft (102 m)
- Length: 2.16 mi (3.48 km)
- Basin size: 1.56 square miles (4.0 km^{2})
- Discharge
  - location: Mayo Creek
  - average: 2.08 cu ft/s (0.059 m^{3}/s) at mouth with Mayo Creek

Basin features
- Progression: Mayo Creek → Hyco River → Dan River → Roanoke River → Albemarle Sound
- River system: Roanoke River
- Tributaries
  - left: unnamed tributaries
  - right: unnamed tributaries
- Waterbodies: unnamed impoundment
- Bridges: Mayo Lake Road

Crutchfield Branch is a 2.16 mi (3.48 km) long 4th order tributary to Mayo Creek in Halifax County, Virginia.

== Course ==
Crutchfield Branch rises about 2 miles northeast of Bethel Hill, North Carolina, and then flows northeast into Halifax County, Virginia to join Mayo Creek about 1.5 miles south of Mayo.

== Watershed ==
Crutchfield Branch drains 1.56 square miles (4.0 km^{2}) of area, receives about 45.9 in/year of precipitation, has a wetness index of 485.76, and is about 45% forested.
