= Kilgore Creek (Hyco Creek tributary) =

Stream in North Carolina, USA

Kilgore Creek Tributary to Hyco Creek
- Location of Kilgore Creek mouth Kilgore Creek (Hyco Creek tributary) (the United States)

Location
- Country: United States
- State: North Carolina
- County: Caswell

Physical characteristics
- Source: South Hyco Creek divide
  - location: about 0.5 miles south of Leasburg, North Carolina
  - coordinates: 36°22′53″N 079°10′33″W
  - elevation: 608 ft (185 m)
- Mouth: Hyco Creek
  - location: about 2 miles northwest of Leasburg, North Carolina
  - coordinates: 36°25′07″N 079°10′44″W
  - elevation: 415 ft (126 m)
- Length: 3.27 mi (5.26 km)
- Basin size: 5.63 square miles (14.6 km^{2})
- Discharge
  - location: Hyco Creek
  - average: 7.01 cu ft/s (0.199 m^{3}/s) at mouth with Hyco Creek

Basin features
- Progression: generally north
- River system: Roanoke River
- Tributaries
  - left: unnamed tributaries
  - right: unnamed tributaries
- Bridges: US 158

Kilgore Creek is a 3.27 mi (5.26 km) long 2nd order tributary to Hyco Creek in Caswell County, North Carolina.

== Course ==
Kilgore Creek rises about 0.5 miles south of Leasburg, North Carolina, and then flows northerly to join Hyco Creek about 2 miles northwest of Leasburg.

== Watershed ==
Kilgore Creek drains 5.63 square miles (14.6 km^{2}) of area, receives about 46.3 in/year of precipitation, has a wetness index of 394.23, and is about 62% forested.
