= Bluewing Creek =

Stream in Virginia, USA

Bluewing Creek Tributary to Hyco River
- Location of Bluewing Creek mouth Bluewing Creek (the United States)

Location
- Country: United States
- State: Virginia; North Carolina
- County: Halifax (VA); Person (NC)

Physical characteristics
- Source: unnamed tributary to Mayo Reservoir divide
  - location: about 2.5 miles southeast of Triple Springs, North Carolina
  - coordinates: 36°27′41″N 078°50′05″W
  - elevation: 581 ft (177 m)
- Mouth: Hyco River
  - location: about 3 miles southeast of Centerville, Virginia
  - coordinates: 36°37′17″N 078°50′16″W
  - elevation: 319 ft (97 m)
- Length: 12.20 mi (19.63 km)
- Basin size: 26.42 square miles (68.4 km^{2})
- Discharge
  - location: Hyco River
  - average: 31.30 cu ft/s (0.886 m^{3}/s) at mouth with Hyco River

Basin features
- Progression: Hyco River → Dan River → Roanoke River → Albemarle Sound
- River system: Roanoke River
- Tributaries
  - left: Little Bluewing Creek
  - right: Cattail Branch; Bredlov Creek
- Bridges: Olive Branch Road, Tatum Road, NC 49, High View Church Road, VA 96, North Fork Church Road

Bluewing Creek is a 12.20 mi (19.63 km) long 3rd order tributary to the Hyco River in Halifax County, Virginia. This is the only stream of this name in the United States.

== Variant names ==
According to the Geographic Names Information System, it has also been known historically as:

- Big Bluewing Creek
- Blewing Creek
- Blue Wing Creek

== Course ==
Bluewing Creek rises in a pond about 2.5 miles southeast of Triple Springs, North Carolina, and then flows generally north to join the Hyco River about 3 miles southeast of Centerville, Virginia.

== Watershed ==
Bluewing Creek drains 26.42 square miles (68.4 km^{2}) of area, receives about 45.8 in/year of precipitation, has a wetness index of 394.32, and is about 57% forested.
