= Lick Branch (Dan River tributary) =

Stream in Virginia, USA

Lick Branch Tributary to Dan River
- Location of Lick Branch mouth Lick Branch (Dan River tributary) (the United States)

Location
- Country: United States
- State: Virginia
- County: Halifax

Physical characteristics
- Source: Hyco River divide
  - location: about 2 miles east-northeast of Omega, Virginia
  - coordinates: 36°40′43″N 078°46′35″W
  - elevation: 400 ft (120 m)
- Mouth
  - location: about 3.5 miles northeast of Omega, Virginia
  - coordinates: 36°41′53″N 078°46′36″W
  - elevation: 318 ft (97 m)
- Length: 1.49 mi (2.40 km)
- Basin size: 0.88 square miles (2.3 km^{2})
- Discharge
  - location: Dan River
  - average: 1.17 cu ft/s (0.033 m^{3}/s) at mouth with Dan River

Basin features
- Progression: Dan River → Roanoke River → Albemarle Sound → Pamlico Sound → Atlantic Ocean
- River system: Roanoke River
- Tributaries
  - left: unnamed tributaries
  - right: unnamed tributaries
- Bridges: Ramble Road

Lick Branch is a 1.49 mi (2.40 km) long 1st order tributary to the Dan River in Halifax County, Virginia.

== Course ==
Lick Branch rises about 2.0 miles east-northeast of Omega, Virginia, and then flows north to join the Dan River about 3.5 miles northeast of Omega.

== Watershed ==
Lick Branch drains 0.88 square miles (2.3 km^{2}) of area, receives about 45.5 in/year of precipitation, has a wetness index of 410.97, and is about 53% forested.

== See also ==
- List of Virginia Rivers
