= Coneys Creek =

Stream in North Carolina, USA

Coneys Creek Tributary to Hyco Creek
- Location of Coneys Creek mouth Coneys Creek (the United States)

Location
- Country: United States
- State: North Carolina
- County: Caswell

Physical characteristics
- Source: Sugartree Creek divide
  - location: pond about 0.25 miles north of Ridgeville, North Carolina
  - coordinates: 36°18′20″N 079°10′58″W
  - elevation: 672 ft (205 m)
- Mouth: Hyco Creek
  - location: about 1 mile west of Frogsboro, North Carolina
  - coordinates: 36°20′35″N 079°12′21″W
  - elevation: 455 ft (139 m)
- Length: 2.26 mi (3.64 km)
- Basin size: 2.81 square miles (7.3 km^{2})
- Discharge
  - location: Hyco Creek
  - average: 3.61 cu ft/s (0.102 m^{3}/s) at mouth with Hyco Creek

Basin features
- Progression: generally north
- River system: Roanoke River
- Tributaries
  - left: unnamed tributaries
  - right: unnamed tributaries
- Bridges: Amoswood Road

Coneys Creek is a 2.26 mi (3.64 km) long 1st order tributary to Hyco Creek in Caswell County, North Carolina. This stream is the only one of its name in the United States.

== Course ==
Coneys Creek rises in a pond about 0.25 miles north of Ridgeville, North Carolina, and then flows northerly to join Hyco Creek about 1 mile west of Frogsboro.

== Watershed ==
Coneys Creek drains 2.81 square miles (7.3 km^{2}) of area, receives about 46.5 in/year of precipitation, has a topographic wetness index of 368.52, and is about 64% forested.
