= Perrin Creek (Dan River tributary) =

Stream in Virginia, USA

Perrin Creek Tributary to Dan River
- Location of Perrin Creek mouth Perrin Creek (Dan River tributary) (the United States)

Location
- Country: United States
- State: Virginia
- County: Halifax

Physical characteristics
- Source: Grassy Creek divide
  - location: about 1.5 miles northwest of Centerville, Virginia
  - coordinates: 36°39′42″N 078°52′40″W
  - elevation: 410 ft (120 m)
- Mouth
  - location: southeast border of South Boston, Virginia
  - coordinates: 36°41′34″N 078°52′24″W
  - elevation: 318 ft (97 m)
- Length: 2.50 mi (4.02 km)
- Basin size: 2.62 square miles (6.8 km^{2})
- Discharge
  - location: Dan River
  - average: 3.39 cu ft/s (0.096 m^{3}/s) at mouth with Dan River

Basin features
- Progression: Dan River → Roanoke River → Albemarle Sound → Pamlico Sound → Atlantic Ocean
- River system: Roanoke River
- Tributaries
  - left: unnamed tributaries
  - right: unnamed tributaries
- Bridges: US 58

Perrin Creek is a 2.50 mi (4.02 km) long 2nd order tributary to the Dan River in Halifax County, Virginia.

== Course ==
Perrin Creek rises about 1.5 miles northwest of Centerville, Virginia, and then flows generally north to join the Dan River at the southeast border of South Boston.

== Watershed ==
Perrin Creek drains 2.62 square miles (6.8 km^{2}) of area, receives about 45.7 in/year of precipitation, has a wetness index of 415.55, and is about 52% forested.

== See also ==
- List of Virginia Rivers

== Watershed Maps ==
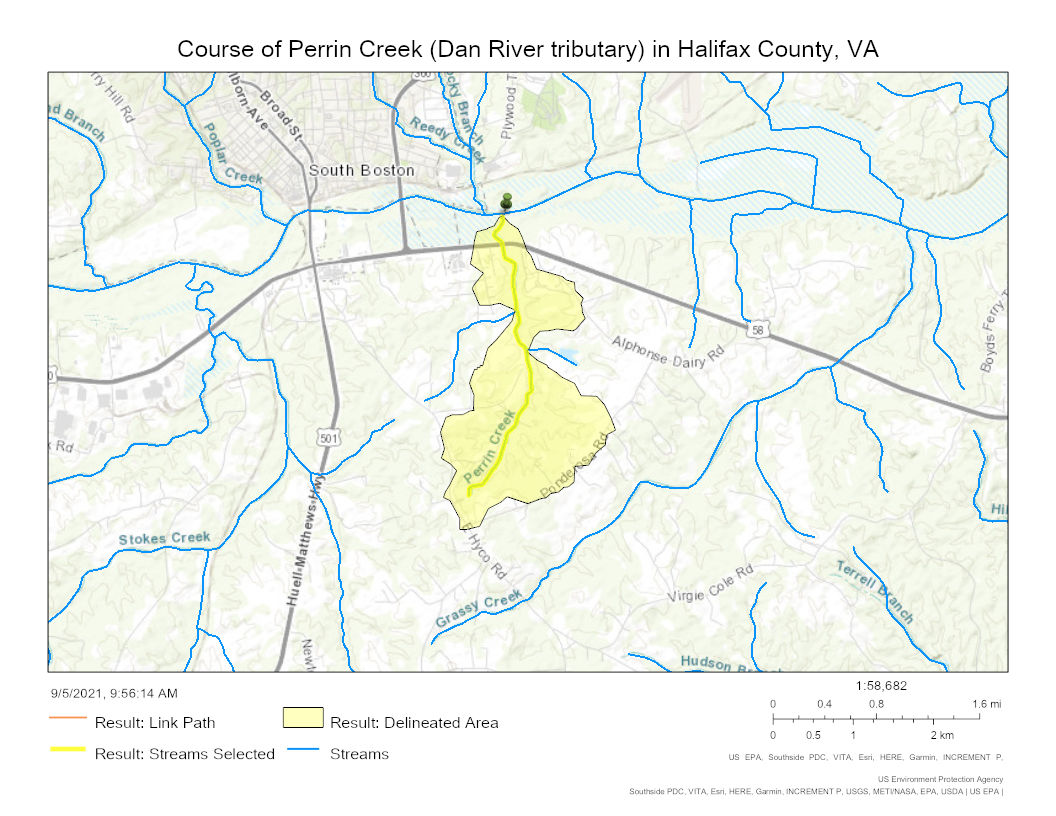
Course of Perrin Creek (Dan River tributary) in Halifax County, Virginia, USA

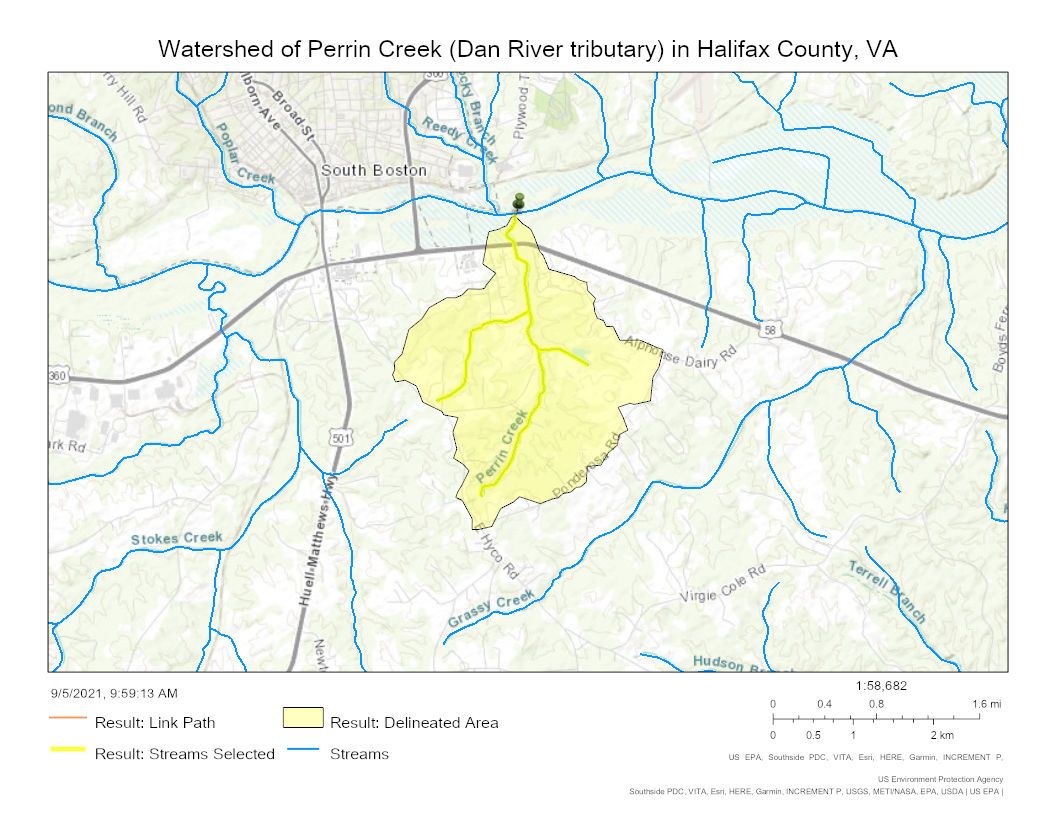
Watershed of Perrin Creek (Dan River tributary) in Halifax County, Virginia, USA
