= Double Creek (South Hyco Creek tributary) =

Stream in North Carolina, US

Double Creek Tributary to South Hyco Creek
- Location of Double Creek mouth Double Creek (South Hyco Creek tributary) (the United States)

Location
- Country: United States
- State: North Carolina
- County: Person

Physical characteristics
- Source: South Flat River divide
  - location: pond about 1 mile northeast of Bushy Fork, North Carolina
  - coordinates: 36°18′52″N 079°04′50″W
  - elevation: 660 ft (200 m)
- Mouth: South Hyco Creek
  - location: about 3 miles southeast of Leasburg, North Carolina
  - coordinates: 36°22′25″N 079°06′48″W
  - elevation: 422 ft (129 m)
- Length: 4.68 mi (7.53 km)
- Basin size: 18.10 square miles (46.9 km^{2})
- Discharge
  - location: South Hyco Creek
  - average: 22.00 cu ft/s (0.623 m^{3}/s) at mouth with South Hyco Creek

Basin features
- Progression: generally north
- River system: Roanoke River
- Tributaries
  - left: Broachs Mill Creek
  - right: unnamed tributaries
- Bridges: Hesters Store Road, Rolling Hills Road

Double Creek is a 4.68 mi (7.53 km) long 3rd order tributary to South Hyco Creek in Person County, North Carolina.

== Course ==
Double Creek rises in a pond about 1 mile northeast of Bushy Fork, North Carolina and then flows northerly to join South Hyco Creek about 3 miles southeast of Leasburg.

== Watershed ==
Double Creek drains 18.10 square miles (46.9 km^{2}) of area, receives about 46.6 in/year of precipitation, has a wetness index of 385.51, and is about 52% forested.
