= Ghent Creek =

Stream in North Carolina, USA

Ghent Creek Tributary to Hyco River
- Location of Ghent Creek mouth Ghent Creek (the United States)

Location
- Country: United States
- State: North Carolina
- County: Person

Physical characteristics
- Source: Storys Creek divide
  - location: pond about 1 northwest of Five Forks, North Carolina
  - coordinates: 36°26′51″N 079°02′22″W
  - elevation: 615 ft (187 m)
- Mouth: Hyco River
  - location: about 4 miles north-northwest of Woodsdale, North Carolina
  - coordinates: 36°31′44″N 078°59′00″W
  - elevation: 340 ft (100 m)
- Length: 6.70 mi (10.78 km)
- Basin size: 6.70 square miles (17.4 km^{2})
- Discharge
  - location: Hyco River
  - average: 8.40 cu ft/s (0.238 m^{3}/s) at mouth with Hyco River

Basin features
- Progression: northeast
- River system: Roanoke River
- Tributaries
  - left: unnamed tributaties
  - right: unnamed tributaries
- Bridges: McGhees Mill Road, Edwin Robertson Road

Ghent Creek is a 6.70 mi (10.78 km) long 4th order tributary to the Hyco River in Person County, North Carolina. This is the only stream of this name in the United States.

== Variant names ==
According to the Geographic Names Information System, it has also been known historically as:

- Ghents Creek

== Course ==
Ghent Creek rises in a pond about 0.5 miles northwest of Five Forks, North Carolina, and then flows northeast to join the Hyco River about 4 miles north-northwest of Woodsdale.

== Watershed ==
Ghent Creek drains 6.70 square miles (17.4 km^{2}) of area, receives about 46.1 in/year of precipitation, has a wetness index of 379.32, and is about 52% forested.
