= Coleman Creek (Hyco River tributary) =

Stream in Virginia, US

Coleman Creek Tributary to Hyco River
- Location of Coleman Creek mouth Coleman Creek (Hyco River tributary) (the United States)

Location
- Country: United States
- State: Virginia
- County: Halifax

Physical characteristics
- Source: Long Branch divide
  - location: about 0.25 miles northeast of Alton, Virginia
  - coordinates: 36°34′43″N 078°59′44″W
  - elevation: 545 ft (166 m)
- Mouth: Hyco River
  - location: about 3 miles southeast of Cluster Springs, Virginia
  - coordinates: 36°35′29″N 078°53′22″W
  - elevation: 321 ft (98 m)
- Length: 8.17 mi (13.15 km)
- Basin size: 13.59 square miles (35.2 km^{2})
- Discharge
  - location: Hyco River
  - average: 16.54 cu ft/s (0.468 m^{3}/s) at mouth with Hyco River

Basin features
- Progression: generally northeast
- River system: Roanoke River
- Tributaries
  - left: Little Coleman Creek; Bales Branch
  - right: unnamed tributaries
- Bridges: Trayham Grove Road, Paradise Road, US 501

Coleman Creek is a 8.17 mi (13.15 km) long 3rd order tributary to the Hyco River in Halifax County, Virginia.

== Variant names ==
According to the Geographic Names Information System, it has also been known historically as:

- Colemans Creek

== Course ==
Coleman Creek rises about 0.25 miles northeast of Alton, Virginia, and then flows northeast to join the Hyco River about 3 miles southeast of Cluster Springs.

== Watershed ==
Coleman Creek drains 13.59 square miles (35.2 km^{2}) of area, receives about 45.8 in/year of precipitation, has a wetness index of 407.40, and is about 52% forested.

== See also ==
- List of rivers of Virginia
