= Richland Creek (South Hyco Creek tributary) =

Stream in North Carolina, USA

Richland Creek Tributary to South Hyco Creek
- Location of Richland Creek mouth Richland Creek (South Hyco Creek tributary) (the United States)

Location
- Country: United States
- State: North Carolina
- County: Person

Physical characteristics
- Source: North Flat River divide
  - location: pond about 0.25 miles northeast of Roseville, North Carolina
  - coordinates: 36°21′47″N 079°01′59″W
  - elevation: 665 ft (203 m)
- Mouth: South Hyco Creek
  - location: about 3 miles southwest of Concord, North Carolina
  - coordinates: 36°25′30″N 079°06′13″W
  - elevation: 410 ft (120 m)
- Length: 6.95 mi (11.18 km)
- Basin size: 8.21 square miles (21.3 km^{2})
- Discharge
  - location: South Hyco Creek
  - average: 10.26 cu ft/s (0.291 m^{3}/s) at mouth with South Hyco Creek

Basin features
- Progression: northwest
- River system: Roanoke River
- Tributaries
  - left: unnamed tributaries
  - right: unnamed tributaries
- Bridges: US 158, Mill Hill Road, John Brewer Road

Richland Creek is a 6.95 mi (11.18 km) long 2nd order tributary to South Hyco Creek in Person County, North Carolina. Richland Creek joins South Hyco Creek within Hyco Lake.

== Variant names ==
According to the Geographic Names Information System, it has also been known historically as:

- Richard Creek

== Course ==
Richland Creek rises in a pond about 0.25 miles northeast of Roseville, North Carolina and then flows northwest to join South Hyco Creek about 3 miles southwest of Concord.

== Watershed ==
Richland Creek drains 8.21 square miles (21.3 km^{2}) of area, receives about 46.5 in/year of precipitation, has a wetness index of 410.23, and is about 49% forested.
