= Castle Creek (Hyco River tributary) =

Stream in North Carolina, US

Castle Creek Tributary to Hyco River
- Location of Castle Creek mouth Castle Creek (Hyco River tributary) (the United States)

Location
- Country: United States
- State: North Carolina
- County: Person

Physical characteristics
- Source: Mill Creek divide
  - location: about 2 miles south-southeast of Harmony, Virginia
  - coordinates: 36°27′23″N 078°55′41″W
  - elevation: 545 ft (166 m)
- Mouth: Hyco River
  - location: pond about 0.5 miles southwest of Gentry Store, North Carolina
  - coordinates: 36°35′29″N 078°53′22″W
  - elevation: 321 ft (98 m)
- Length: 6.67 mi (10.73 km)
- Basin size: 11.53 square miles (29.9 km^{2})
- Discharge
  - location: Hyco River
  - average: 14.21 cu ft/s (0.402 m^{3}/s) at mouth with Hyco River

Basin features
- Progression: Hyco River → Dan River → Roanoke River → Albemarle Sound
- River system: Roanoke River
- Tributaries
  - left: unnamed tributaries
  - right: Bamboo Branch
- Bridges: Haywood Bailey Road, Shiloh Church Road

Castle Creek is a 6.67 mi (10.73 km) long 3rd order tributary to the Hyco River in Person County, North Carolina.

== Course ==
Castle Creek rises in a pond about 0.5 miles southwest of Gentry Store, North Carolina, and then flows north to join the Hyco River about 2 miles south-southeast of Harmony, Virginia.

== Watershed ==
Castle Creek drains 11.53 square miles (29.9 km^{2}) of area, receives about 46.2 in/year of precipitation, has a wetness index of 373.81, and is about 55% forested.
