= Chatman Branch (Dan River tributary) =

Stream in Virginia, U.S.

Chatman Branch Tributary to Dan River
- Location of Chatman Branch mouth Chatman Branch (Dan River tributary) (the United States)

Location
- Country: United States
- State: Virginia
- County: Halifax

Physical characteristics
- Source: Hilly Creek divide
  - location: about 0.5 miles east of Omega, Virginia
  - coordinates: 36°40′15″N 078°47′45″W
  - elevation: 417 ft (127 m)
- Mouth
  - location: about 2 miles north-northeast of Omega, Virginia
  - coordinates: 36°41′52″N 078°47′45″W
  - elevation: 318 ft (97 m)
- Length: 2.05 mi (3.30 km)
- Basin size: 1.45 square miles (3.8 km^{2})
- Discharge
  - location: Dan River
  - average: 1.91 cu ft/s (0.054 m^{3}/s) at mouth with Dan River

Basin features
- Progression: Dan River → Roanoke River → Albemarle Sound → Pamlico Sound → Atlantic Ocean
- River system: Roanoke River
- Tributaries
  - left: unnamed tributaries
  - right: unnamed tributaries
- Bridges: none

Chatman Branch is a 2.05 mi (3.30 km) long 1st order tributary to the Dan River in Halifax County, Virginia.

== Course ==
Chatman Branch rises about 0.5 miles east of Omega, Virginia, and then flows north to join the Dan River about 2 miles north-northeast of Omega.

== Watershed ==
Chatman Branch drains 1.45 square miles (3.8 km^{2}) of area, receives about 45.6 in/year of precipitation, has a wetness index of 387.79, and is about 66% forested.

== See also ==
- List of Virginia Rivers
