= South Hyco Creek =

Stream in North Carolina, USA

South Hyco Creek Tributary to Hyco River
- Location of South Hyco Creek mouth South Hyco Creek (the United States)

Location
- Country: United States
- State: North Carolina
- County: Person; Caswell; Orange

Physical characteristics
- Source: East Fork Eno River divide
  - location: about 2.5 miles southeast of Prospect Hill, North Carolina
  - coordinates: 36°12′58″N 079°10′26″W
  - elevation: 705 ft (215 m)
- Mouth: Hyco River
  - location: about 3 miles east-southeast of Semora, North Carolina
  - coordinates: 36°28′59″N 079°05′42″W
  - elevation: 410 ft (120 m)
- Length: 23.56 mi (37.92 km)
- Basin size: 81.31 square miles (210.6 km^{2})
- Discharge
  - location: Hyco River
  - average: 92.46 cu ft/s (2.618 m^{3}/s) at mouth with Hyco River

Basin features
- Progression: Hyco River → Dan River → Roanoke River → Albemarle Sound
- River system: Roanoke River
- Tributaries
  - left: Sugartree Creek; Cub Creek
  - right: Double Creek; Richland Creek; Little Duck Creek
- Waterbodies: Lake Roxboro; Hyco Lake
- Bridges: Burton Road, Allison Road, Bama Road, NC 49, Gordonton Road, US 158, John Brewer Road, Concord Church Road, Semora Road

South Hyco Creek is a 23.56 mi (37.92 km) long 4th order tributary to the Hyco River in Person County, North Carolina. South Hyco Creek joins the Hyco River within Hyco Lake. South Hyco Creek forms the Hyco River along with Hyco Creek.

== Variant names ==
According to the Geographic Names Information System, it has also been known historically as:

- Sugartree Creek
- Sugar Tree Creek

== Course ==
South Hyco Creek rises about 2.5 miles southeast of Prospect Hill, North Carolina and then flows north-northeast to join the Hyco River about 3 miles east-southeast of Semora, North Carolina.

== Watershed ==
South Hyco Creek drains 81.31 square miles (210.6 km^{2}) of area, receives about 46.5 in/year of precipitation, has a wetness index of 400.00, and is about 54% forested.
