= Reedy Fork =

Reedy Fork may refer to:

- Reedy Fork (Haw River tributary), in Alamance County, North Carolina, United States
- Reedy Fork (Hyco Creek tributary), in Caswell County, North Carolina, United States
