= Halfway Creek (Hyco River tributary) =

Stream in Virginia, USA

Halfway Creek Tributary to Hyco River
- Location of Halfway Creek mouth Halfway Creek (Hyco River tributary) (the United States)

Location
- Country: United States
- State: Virginia
- County: Halifax

Physical characteristics
- Source: Stokes Creek divide
  - location: Cluster Springs, Virginia
  - coordinates: 36°37′02″N 078°55′28″W
  - elevation: 465 ft (142 m)
- Mouth: Hyco River
  - location: about 2.5 miles southeast of Cluster Springs, Virginia
  - coordinates: 36°36′41″N 078°52′58″W
  - elevation: 320 ft (98 m)
- Length: 2.54 mi (4.09 km)
- Basin size: 3.01 square miles (7.8 km^{2})
- Discharge
  - location: Hyco River
  - average: 3.89 cu ft/s (0.110 m^{3}/s) at mouth with Hyco River

Basin features
- Progression: east-southeast
- River system: Roanoke River
- Tributaries
  - left: unnamed tributaries
  - right: unnamed tributaries
- Bridges: US 501

Halfway Creek is a 2.54 mi (4.09 km) long 2nd order tributary to the Hyco River in Halifax County, Virginia.

== Course ==
Halfway Creek rises in Cluster Springs, Virginia, and then flows generally east-southeast to join the Hyco River about 2.5 miles southeast of Cluster Springs.

== Watershed ==
Halfway Creek drains 3.01 square miles (7.8 km^{2}) of area, receives about 45.8 in/year of precipitation, has a wetness index of 388.13, and is about 59% forested.

== See also ==
- List of rivers of Virginia
