= Cub Creek (South Hyco Creek tributary) =

Stream in Person County, North Carolina, United States

Cub Creek Tributary to South Hyco Creek
- Location of Cub Creek mouth Cub Creek (South Hyco Creek tributary) (the United States)

Location
- Country: United States
- State: North Carolina
- County: Person

Physical characteristics
- Source: Cobbs Creek divide
  - location: about 1 mile southeast of Leasburg, North Carolina
  - coordinates: 36°23′17″N 079°08′03″W
  - elevation: 560 ft (170 m)
- Mouth: South Hyco Creek
  - location: about 1.5 miles south-southwest of Longs Store, North Carolina
  - coordinates: 36°24′31″N 079°06′24″W
  - elevation: 410 ft (120 m)
- Length: 2.44 mi (3.93 km)
- Basin size: 1.86 square miles (4.8 km^{2})
- Discharge
  - location: South Hyco Creek
  - average: 2.44 cu ft/s (0.069 m^{3}/s) at mouth with South Hyco Creek

Basin features
- Progression: northeast
- River system: Roanoke River
- Tributaries
  - left: unnamed tributaries
  - right: unnamed tributaries
- Bridges: US 158

Cub Creek is a 2.44-mile-long (3.93 km) first-order tributary to South Hyco Creek in Person County, North Carolina. Cub Creek joins South Hyco Creek within Hyco Lake.

== Course ==
Cub Creek rises about 1 mile (1.6 km) southeast of Leasburg, North Carolina, and then flows northeast to join South Hyco Creek about 1.5 miles (2.4 km) south-southwest of Longs Store.

== Watershed ==
Cub Creek drains 1.86 square miles (4.8 km^{2}) of area, receives about 46.4 in/year (118 cm/year) of precipitation, has a wetness index of 385.84, and is about 57% forested.

== See also ==
- List of rivers in North Carolina
