= Hyco Creek =

Stream in North Carolina, USA

Hyco Creek Tributary to Hyco River
- Location of Hyco Creek mouth Hyco Creek (the United States)

Location
- Country: United States
- State: North Carolina
- County: Person; Caswell

Physical characteristics
- Source: Jordan Creek divide
  - location: about 2 miles east-southeast of Anderson, North Carolina
  - coordinates: 36°15′14″N 079°17′45″W
  - elevation: 718 ft (219 m)
- Mouth: Hyco River
  - location: about 3 miles east-southeast of Semora, North Carolina
  - coordinates: 36°28′59″N 079°05′41″W
  - elevation: 410 ft (120 m)
- Length: 25.25 mi (40.64 km)
- Basin size: 93.50 square miles (242.2 km^{2})
- Discharge
  - location: Hyco River
  - average: 100.69 cu ft/s (2.851 m^{3}/s) at mouth with Hyco River

Basin features
- Progression: north-northeast
- River system: Roanoke River
- Tributaries
  - left: Reedy Fork
  - right: Negro Creek; Lynch Creek; Panther Branch; Coneys Creek; Kilgore Creek; Cobbs Creek
- Bridges: Gunn Poole Road, NC 86, Grier Church Road, US 158, Briggs Road, Osmond Road, NC 57

Hyco Creek is a 25.25 mi (40.64 km) long 3rd order tributary to the Hyco River in Person County, North Carolina. Hyco Creek joins the Hyco River within Hyco Lake. Hyco Creek forms the Hyco River along with South Hyco Creek.

== Variant names ==
According to the Geographic Names Information System, it has also been known historically as:

- Hyco River
- North Hyco Creek

== Course ==
Hyco Creek rises in a pond about 2 miles east-southeast of Anderson, North Carolina and then flows north-northeast to join the Hyco River about 3 miles east-southeast of Semora, North Carolina.

== Watershed ==
Hyco Creek drains 93.50 square miles (242.2 km^{2}) of area, receives about 46.4 in/year of precipitation, has a wetness index of 376.74, and is about 58% forested.
