= Negro Creek (Hyco Creek tributary) =

Stream in North Carolina, USA

Negro Creek Tributary to Hyco Creek
- Location of Negro Creek mouth Negro Creek (Hyco Creek tributary) (the United States)

Location
- Country: United States
- State: North Carolina
- County: Caswell; Alamance

Physical characteristics
- Source: Stagg Creek divide
  - location: about 2.5 miles southeast of Baynea, North Carolina
  - coordinates: 36°14′20″N 079°16′55″W
  - elevation: 732 ft (223 m)
- Mouth: Hyco Creek
  - location: about 2 miles south-southeast of Hightowers, North Carolina
  - coordinates: 36°18′15″N 079°14′17″W
  - elevation: 488 ft (149 m)
- Length: 4.80 mi (7.72 km)
- Basin size: 8.05 square miles (20.8 km^{2})
- Discharge
  - location: Hyco Creek
  - average: 9.85 cu ft/s (0.279 m^{3}/s) at mouth with Hyco Creek

Basin features
- Progression: north-northeast
- River system: Roanoke River
- Tributaries
  - left: unnamed tributaries
  - right: unnamed tributaries
- Bridges: Old Collins Road, Gunn Poole Road, Hightower Road

Negro Creek is a 4.80 mi (7.72 km) long 2nd order tributary to Hyco Creek in Caswell County, North Carolina.

== Course ==
Negro Creek rises about 2.5 miles southeast of Baynea, North Carolina in Alamance County, and then flows northeasterly into Caswell County to join Hyco Creek about 2 miles south-southeast of Hightowers.

== Watershed ==
Negro Creek drains 8.05 square miles (20.8 km^{2}) of area, receives about 46.5 in/year of precipitation, has a topographic wetness index of 362.36, and is about 54% forested.
