= Larkin Branch (Hyco River tributary) =

Stream in Virginia, USA

Larkin Branch Tributary to Hyco River
- Location of Larkin Branch mouth Larkin Branch (Hyco River tributary) (the United States)

Location
- Country: United States
- State: Virginia
- County: Halifax

Physical characteristics
- Source: Bluewing Creek divide
  - location: about 0.25 miles southeast of Larrys Store, Virginia
  - coordinates: 36°35′54″N 078°47′25″W
  - elevation: 460 ft (140 m)
- Mouth: Hyco River
  - location: about 2.5 miles south of Omega, Virginia
  - coordinates: 36°38′11″N 078°48′22″W
  - elevation: 318 ft (97 m)
- Length: 3.82 mi (6.15 km)
- Basin size: 3.36 square miles (8.7 km^{2})
- Discharge
  - location: Hyco River
  - average: 4.28 cu ft/s (0.121 m^{3}/s) at mouth with Hyco River

Basin features
- Progression: Hyco River → Dan River → Roanoke River → Albemarle Sound
- River system: Roanoke River
- Tributaries
  - left: unnamed tributaries
  - right: unnamed tributaries
- Bridges: Cemetery Road, North Fork Church Road

Larkin Branch is a 3.82 mi (6.15 km) long 2nd order tributary to the Hyco River in Halifax County, Virginia.

== Course ==
Larkin Branch rises about 0.25 miles southeast of Larrys Store, Virginia, and then flows generally north with curves to join the Hyco River about 2.5 miles south of Omega.

== Watershed ==
Larkin Branch drains 3.36 square miles (8.7 km^{2}) of area, receives about 45.6 in/year of precipitation, has a wetness index of 398.74, and is about 50% forested.

== See also ==
- List of rivers of Virginia
