= Garland-Buford House =

Historic house in North Carolina, United States

- U.S. National Register of Historic Places
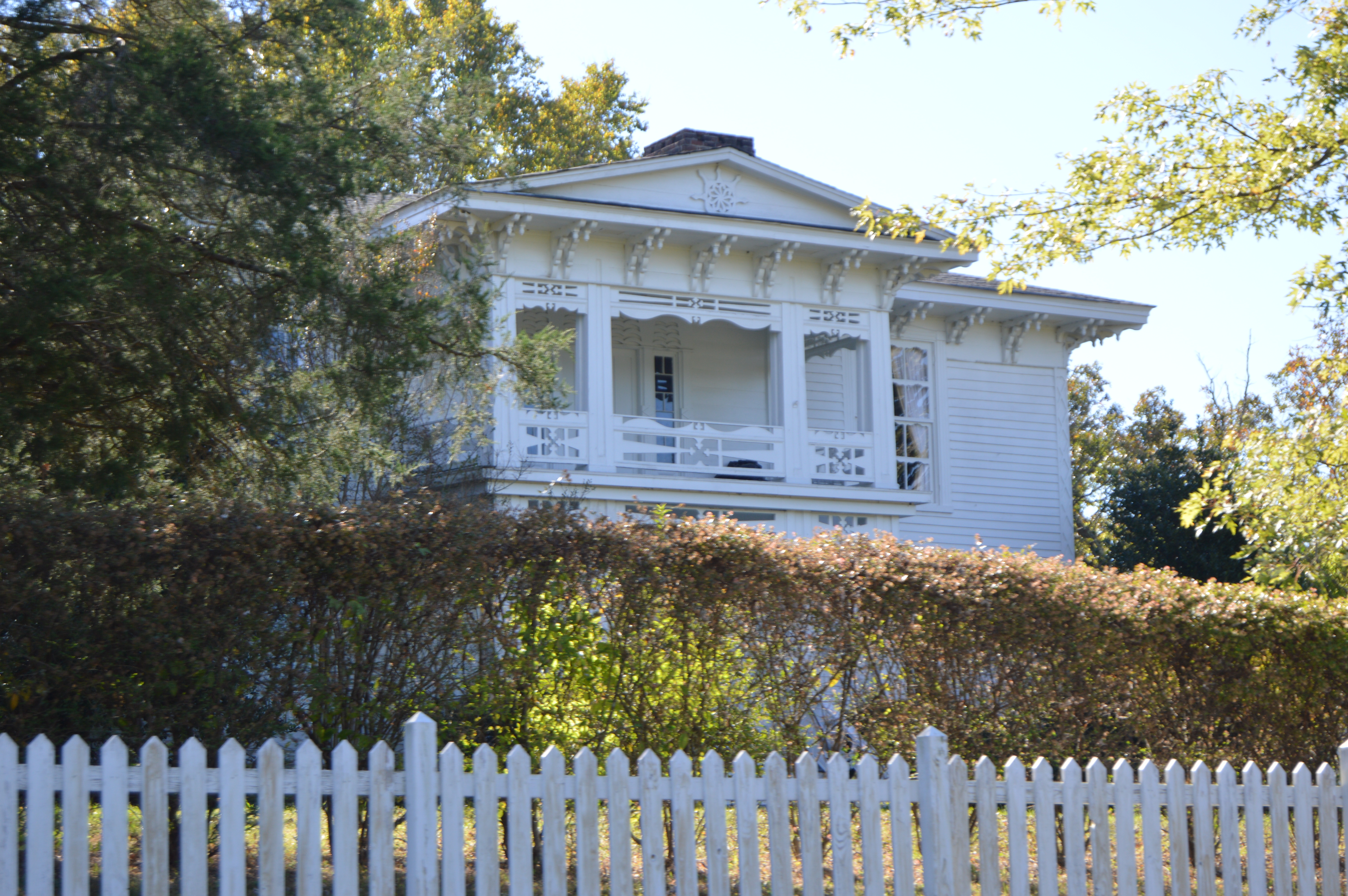
- Front of the house

- Location within North Carolina Location within the United States
- Location: North of Leasburg on SR 1561, near Leasburg, North Carolina
- Coordinates: 36°27′27″N 79°8′56.5″W
- Area: 9 acres (3.6 ha)
- Built: 1877
- Architectural style: Victorian
- NRHP reference No.: 74001333
- Added to NRHP: January 24, 1974

Garland-Buford House is a historic home located near Leasburg, Caswell County, North Carolina. It was built in 1877, and is a large two-story, rectangular Victorian frame house, with three bays wide and two deep. It is set on a fully-raised basement of fieldstone and brick. It features highly decorated, inventive, exuberant and stonework ornaments and a three-bay two-story pedimented front porch.

It was added to the National Register of Historic Places in 1974.
