= Reedy Fork (Hyco Creek tributary) =

Stream in North Carolina, USA

Reedy Fork Tributary to Hyco Creek
- Location of Reedy Fork mouth Reedy Fork (Hyco Creek tributary) (the United States)

Location
- Country: United States
- State: North Carolina
- County: Caswell

Physical characteristics
- Source: Country Line Creek divide
  - location: Hightowers, North Carolina
  - coordinates: 36°20′03″N 079°14′17″W
  - elevation: 645 ft (197 m)
- Mouth: Hyco Creek
  - location: about 0.75 miles west of Osmond, North Carolina
  - coordinates: 36°26′54″N 079°10′35″W
  - elevation: 410 ft (120 m)
- Length: 10.13 mi (16.30 km)
- Basin size: 15.97 square miles (41.4 km^{2})
- Discharge
  - location: Hyco Creek
  - average: 19.04 cu ft/s (0.539 m^{3}/s) at mouth with Hyco Creek

Basin features
- Progression: north-northeast
- River system: Roanoke River
- Tributaries
  - left: unnamed tributaries
  - right: unnamed tributaries
- Bridges: US 158, NC 119

Reedy Fork is a 10.13 mi (16.30 km) long 2nd order tributary to Hyco Creek in Caswell County, North Carolina. Reedy Fork joins Hyco Creek within Hyco Lake.

== Variant names ==
According to the Geographic Names Information System, it has also been known historically as:

- Reedy Creek Fork
- Reedy Fork Creek

== Course ==
Reedy Fork rises in Hightowers, North Carolina and then flows north-northeast to join Hyco Creek about 0.75 miles west of Osmond.

== Watershed ==
Reedy Fork drains 15.97 square miles (41.4 km^{2}) of area, receives about 46.2 in/year of precipitation, has a wetness index of 356.80, and is about 54% forested.
