= Wildwood (Semora, North Carolina) =

Historic house in North Carolina, United States

- U.S. National Register of Historic Places
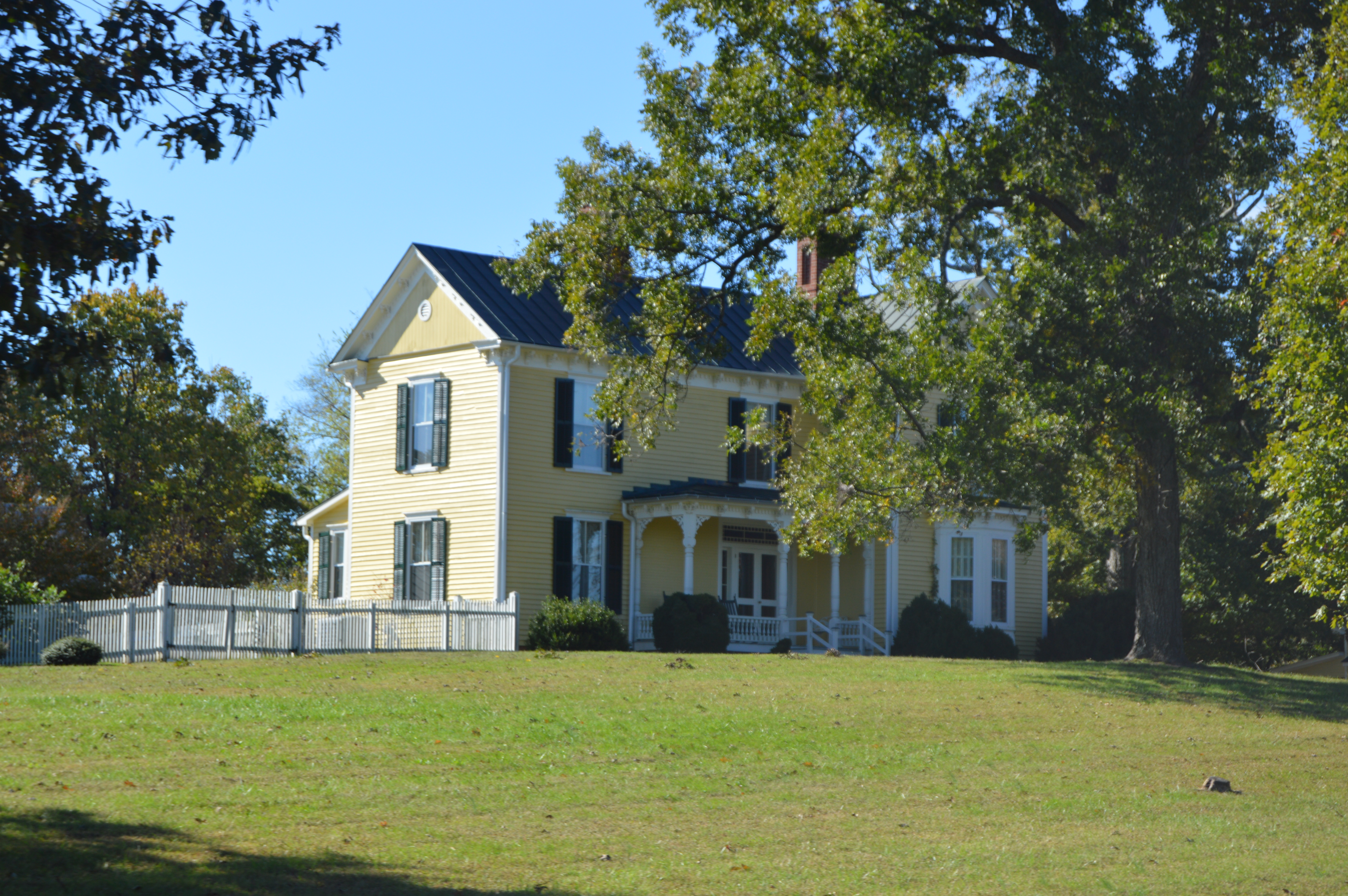
- Front of the house

- Location within North Carolina Location within the United States
- Location: 5680 Stephenton Rd., near Semora, North Carolina
- Coordinates: 36°27′20″N 79°11′47″W
- Area: 4.1 acres (1.7 ha)
- Built: 1893
- Built by: McCain & Buntin
- Architect: J.K. McIver
- Architectural style: Queen Anne, Greek Revival
- NRHP reference No.: 01001076
- Added to NRHP: October 5, 2001

Wildwood, also known as the Monroe Long House and Taylor Long Homeplace, is a historic home located near Semora, Caswell County, North Carolina. It was built in 1893, and is a two-story, frame T-shaped I-house. It has a two-story rear service wing. It sits on a brick foundation and is sheathed in weatherboard. It has Queen Anne and Greek Revival style design elements. Also on the property are a contributing smokehouse (c. 1895) and two original log tobacco barns (c. 1890).

It was added to the National Register of Historic Places in 1986.
