= Warren House and Warren's Store =

Historic buildings in North Carolina, United States

- U.S. National Register of Historic Places
- U.S. Historic district
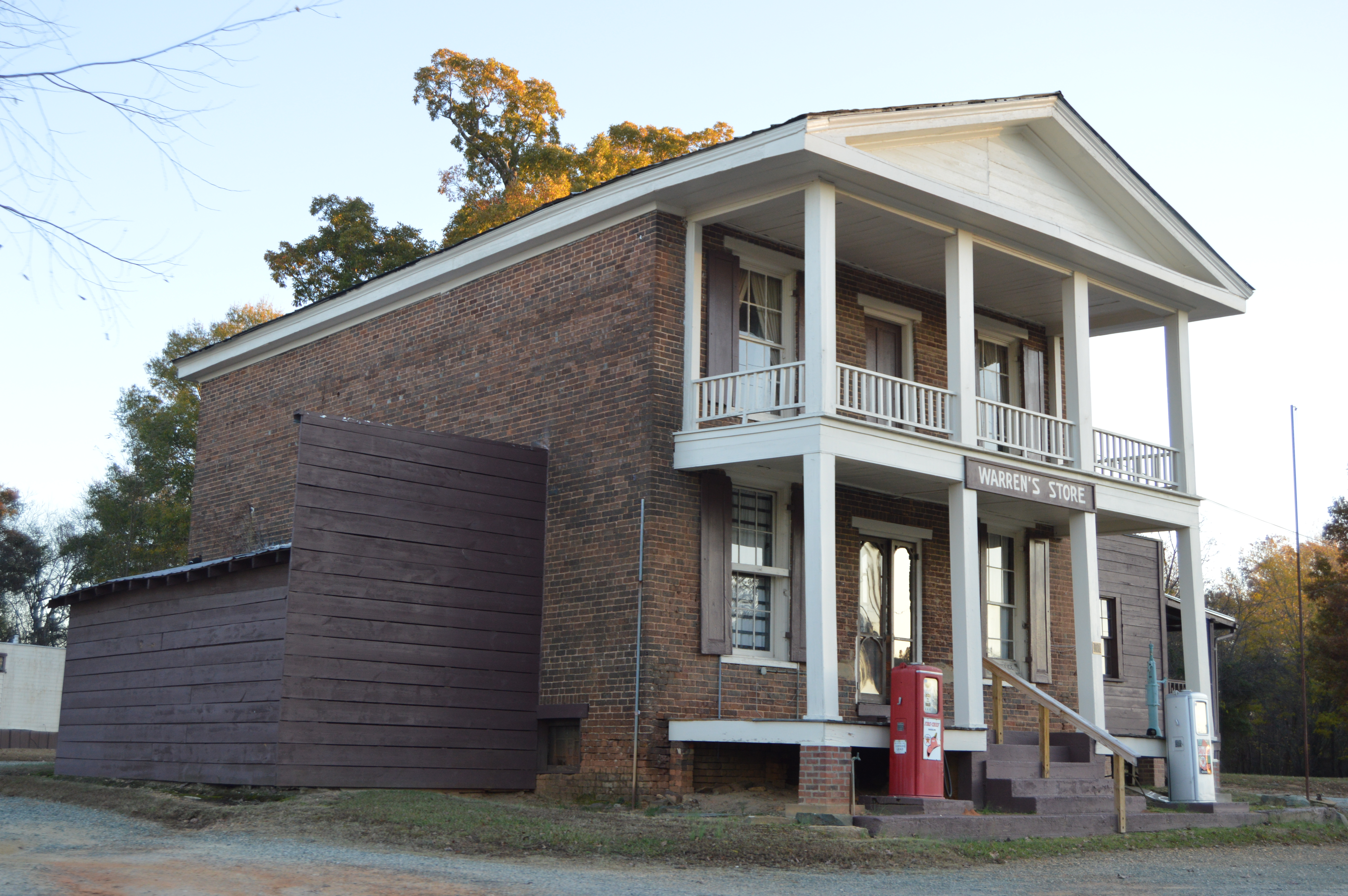
- Warren's Store

- Location within North Carolina Location within the United States
- Location: Main Street, Prospect Hill, North Carolina
- Coordinates: 36°14′56″N 79°11′24″W
- Area: 6 acres (2.4 ha)
- Built: 1858
- Architectural style: Greek Revival, Greek revival vernacular
- NRHP reference No.: 73001308
- Added to NRHP: June 19, 1973

Warren House and Warren's Store is a historic house and store and national historic district located at Prospect Hill, Caswell County, North Carolina. The house was built about 1858, and is a two-story, three-bay, Greek Revival style frame dwelling. It is set on a brick foundation and has a low hipped roof. The front facade features a two-story, three-bay, pedimented porch. Warren's Store and Post Office is located across from the house and is a two-story rectangular brick building of vernacular Greek Revival temple-form design. Also on the property is the contributing kitchen building.

It was added to the National Register of Historic Places in 1973.
