= Line Branch (Dan River tributary) =

Stream in Virginia, USA

Line Branch Tributary to Dan River
- Location of Line Branch mouth Line Branch (Dan River tributary) (the United States)

Location
- Country: United States
- State: Virginia
- County: Halifax

Physical characteristics
- Source: Sailor Creek divide (Brier Mountain)
  - location: about 1 mile southeast of Dryburg, Virginia
  - coordinates: 36°42′54″N 078°42′38″W
  - elevation: 390 ft (120 m)
- Mouth
  - location: about 1 mile northeast of Aarons Creek, Virginia
  - coordinates: 36°41′06″N 078°42′16″W
  - elevation: 300 ft (91 m)
- Length: 2.75 mi (4.43 km)
- Basin size: 2.41 square miles (6.2 km^{2})
- Discharge
  - location: Dan River
  - average: 3.00 cu ft/s (0.085 m^{3}/s) at mouth with Dan River

Basin features
- Progression: Dan River → Roanoke River → Albemarle Sound → Pamlico Sound → Atlantic Ocean
- River system: Roanoke River
- Tributaries
  - left: unnamed tributaries
  - right: unnamed tributaries
- Bridges: none

Line Branch is a 2.75 mi (4.43 km) long 1st order tributary to the Dan River in Halifax County, Virginia.

== Course ==
Line Branch rises about 1 mile southeast of Dryburg, Virginia, and then flows south-southeast to join the Dan River about 1 mile northeast of Aarons Creek.

== Watershed ==
Line Branch drains 2.41 square miles (6.2 km^{2}) of area, receives about 45.2 in/year of precipitation, has a wetness index of 464.12, and is about 88% forested.

== See also ==
- List of Virginia Rivers
