= Lynch Creek (Hyco Creek tributary) =

Stream in North Carolina, USA

Lynch Creek Tributary to Hyco Creek
- Location of Lynch Creek mouth Lynch Creek (Hyco Creek tributary) (the United States)

Location
- Country: United States
- State: North Carolina
- County: Caswell; Orange

Physical characteristics
- Source: Frank Creek divide
  - location: about 1.5 miles northwest of Carr, North Carolina
  - coordinates: 36°13′21″N 079°13′13″W
  - elevation: 702 ft (214 m)
- Mouth: Hyco Creek
  - location: about 1 mile southeast of Hightowers, North Carolina
  - coordinates: 36°19′20″N 079°13′15″W
  - elevation: 468 ft (143 m)
- Length: 7.79 mi (12.54 km)
- Basin size: 11.66 square miles (30.2 km^{2})
- Discharge
  - location: Hyco Creek
  - average: 14.12 cu ft/s (0.400 m^{3}/s) at mouth with Hyco Creek

Basin features
- Progression: north
- River system: Roanoke River
- Tributaries
  - left: unnamed tributaries
  - right: unnamed tributaries
- Bridges: Wade Loop, Dave Smith Road, Brooks Road, Old NC 86, NC 86, Corbett Ridge Road

Lynch Creek is a 7.79 mi (12.54 km) long 2nd order tributary to Hyco Creek in Caswell County, North Carolina, United States.

== Course ==
Lynch Creek rises about 1.5 miles northwest of Carr, North Carolina in Orange County, and then flows northerly to join Hyco Creek about 1 mile southeast of Hightowers.

== Watershed ==
Lynch Creek drains 11.66 square miles (30.2 km^{2}) of area, receives about 46.6 in/year of precipitation, has a topographic wetness index of 363.27, and is about 54% forested.
