= Pond Branch (Dan River tributary) =

Stream in Virginia, USA

Pond Branch Tributary to Dan River
- Location of Pond Branch mouth Pond Branch (Dan River tributary) (the United States)

Location
- Country: United States
- State: Virginia
- County: Halifax

Physical characteristics
- Source: Toots Creek divide
  - location: about 2 miles southwest of Centerville, Virginia
  - coordinates: 36°42′56″N 078°56′16″W
  - elevation: 485 ft (148 m)
- Mouth
  - location: about 0.5 miles southwest of South Boston, Virginia
  - coordinates: 36°41′06″N 078°55′43″W
  - elevation: 320 ft (98 m)
- Length: 1.67 mi (2.69 km)
- Basin size: 3.16 square miles (8.2 km^{2})
- Discharge
  - location: Dan River
  - average: 2.15 cu ft/s (0.061 m^{3}/s) at mouth with Dan River

Basin features
- Progression: Dan River → Roanoke River → Albemarle Sound → Pamlico Sound → Atlantic Ocean
- River system: Roanoke River
- Tributaries
  - left: unnamed tributaries
  - right: unnamed tributaries
- Bridges: Berry Hill Road

Pond Branch is a 1.67 mi (2.69 km) long 1st order tributary to the Dan River in Halifax County, Virginia.

== Course ==
Pond Branch rises about 2 miles southwest of Centerville, Virginia, and then flows generally southeast to join the Dan River about 0.5 miles southwest of South Boston.

== Watershed ==
Pond Branch drains 3.16 square miles (8.2 km^{2}) of area, receives about 45.6 in/year of precipitation, has a wetness index of 421.49, and is about 65% forested.

== See also ==
- List of Virginia Rivers

== Watershed Maps ==
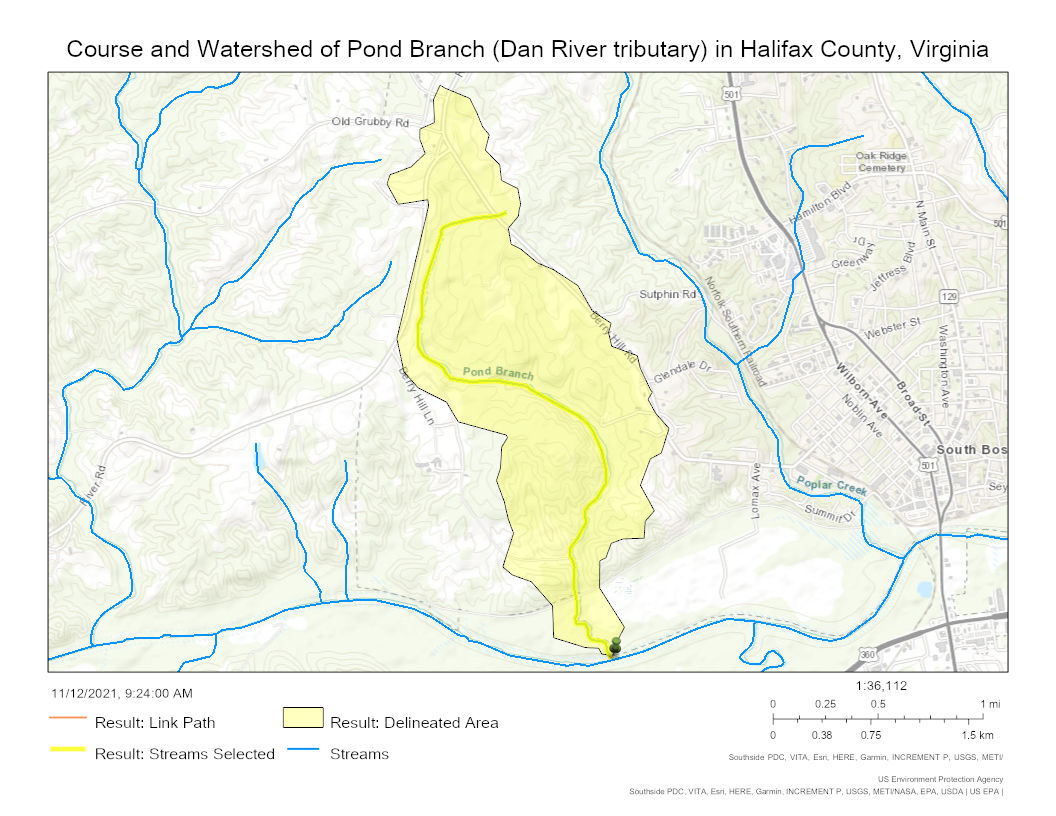
Course and Watershed of Pond Branch (Dan River tributary) in Halifax County, Virginia
