= Morris Branch (Hyco River tributary) =

Stream in Virginia, USA

Morris Branch Tributary to Hyco River
- Location of Morris Branch mouth Morris Branch (Hyco River tributary) (the United States)

Location
- Country: United States
- State: Virginia
- County: Halifax

Physical characteristics
- Source: North Fork Aarons Creek divide
  - location: Moffett, Virginia
  - coordinates: 36°37′48″N 078°45′20″W
  - elevation: 500 ft (150 m)
- Mouth: Hyco River at John H. Kerr Reservoir
  - location: about 0.5 miles north-northwest of Aarons Creek, Virginia
  - coordinates: 36°40′44″N 078°43′55″W
  - elevation: 300 ft (91 m)
- Length: 3.47 mi (5.58 km)
- Basin size: 3.55 square miles (9.2 km^{2})
- Discharge
  - location: Hyco River
  - average: 4.42 cu ft/s (0.125 m^{3}/s) at mouth with Hyco River

Basin features
- Progression: Hyco River → Dan River → Roanoke River → Albemarle Sound
- River system: Roanoke River
- Tributaries
  - left: unnamed tributaries
  - right: unnamed tributaries
- Bridges: US 58

Morris Branch is a 3.47 mi (5.58 km) long 2nd order tributary to the Hyco River in Halifax County, Virginia.

== Course ==
Morris Branch rises at Moffett, Virginia and then flows north to join the Hyco River about 0.5 miles north-northwest of Aarons Creek.

== Watershed ==
Morris Branch drains 3.55 square miles (9.2 km^{2}) of area, receives about 45.3 in/year of precipitation, has a wetness index of 430.34, and is about 49% forested.

== See also ==
- List of rivers of Virginia
