= Mayo Creek (Hyco River tributary) =

Stream in Virginia, USA

Mayo Creek Tributary to Hyco River
- Location of Mayo Creek mouth Mayo Creek (Hyco River tributary) (the United States)

Location
- Country: United States
- State: Virginia; North Carolina
- County: Halifax (VA); Person (NC)

Physical characteristics
- Source: Mill Creek divide
  - location: about 1.5 miles (2.4 km) north of Allensville, North Carolina
  - coordinates: 36°23′41″N 078°55′44″W
  - elevation: 660 ft (200 m)
- Mouth: Hyco River
  - location: about 1 mile (1.6 km) east-northeast of Mayo, Virginia
  - coordinates: 36°35′18″N 078°53′16″W
  - elevation: 322 ft (98 m)
- Length: 20.62 mi (33.18 km)
- Basin size: 60.95 square miles (157.9 km^{2})
- Discharge
  - location: Hyco River
  - average: 48.13 cu ft/s (1.363 m^{3}/s) at mouth with Hyco River

Basin features
- Progression: Hyco River → Dan River → Roanoke River → Albemarle Sound
- River system: Roanoke River
- Tributaries
  - left: Mill Creek; Crutchfield Branch
  - right: Donaldson Creek
- Waterbodies: Mayo Reservoir
- Bridges: Cedar Grove Church Road, Jack Brann Road, Allensville Road, Parham Road, Lawson Chapel Church Road, NC 49, Bowmantown Road, Mayo Lake Road, VA 96

Mayo Creek is a 20.62 mi (33.18 km) long 4th order tributary to the Hyco River in Halifax County, Virginia.

== Variant names ==
According to the Geographic Names Information System, it has also been known historically as:

- Maho Creek
- Mayho Creek
- Mayo River
- Sugar Tree Creek

== Course ==
Mayo Creek rises about 1.5 miles (2.4 km) west of Allensville, North Carolina, and then flows generally north into Halifax County, Virginia to join the Hyco River about 1 mile (1.6 km) north-northeast of Mayo.

== Watershed ==
Mayo Creek drains 60.95 square miles (157.9 km^{2}) of area, receives about 46.3 inches per year (118 cm/year) of precipitation, has a wetness index of 448.38, and is about 55% forested.
