= Hightowers, North Carolina =

- Unincorporated community
- Location of Hightowers in North Carolina Hightowers (the United States)
- Coordinates: 36°19′37″N 79°14′36″W
- Country: United States
- State: North Carolina
- County: Caswell
- Township: Hightowers
- Elevation: 712 ft (217 m)
- Time zone: UTC-5 (Eastern (EST))
  - Summer (DST): UTC-4 (EDT)
- Area code: 336
- GNIS feature ID: 1006239

Hightowers is an unincorporated community in Hightowers Township, Caswell County, North Carolina, United States, northwest of Prospect Hill. It is located around the intersection of North Carolina Highway 119, and Nicks Road, a former alignment of Highway 86.

Reedy Fork, a tributary to Hyco Creek, rises here.
