= Acorn Records =

American record label

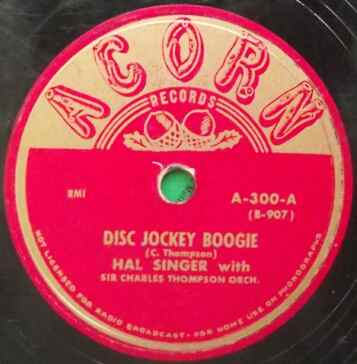
- Parent company: Savoy Records
- Founded: 1950
- Defunct: 1951
- Genre: Rhythm and blues, jazz, gospel
- Country of origin: United States
- Location: Newark, New Jersey

Acorn Records was a short-lived American record label which issued several singles by notable musical artists from 1950 to 1951.

== History ==
The label was formed in 1950. It was created by Herman Lubinsky in order to utilize distribution channels apart from its parent company, Savoy. Nevertheless, Savoy was listed as the selling agent. The label ceased production by the end of 1951.

== Artists ==
- Tommy Brown
- Carolina Slim
- Erroll Garner
- John Lee Hooker (as "The Boogie Man")
- Patterson Singers
- Jimmy Scott (as "Little Jimmy")
- Hal Singer
- Sir Charles Thompson
