= Reedy Creek (Dan River tributary) =

Stream in Virginia, USA

Reedy Creek Tributary to Dan River
- Location of Reedy Creek mouth Reedy Creek (Dan River tributary) (the United States)

Location
- Country: United States
- State: Virginia
- County: Halifax
- City: South Boston

Physical characteristics
- Source: Myers Creek divide
  - location: Loves Shop, Virginia
  - coordinates: 36°43′48″N 078°54′11″W
  - elevation: 470 ft (140 m)
- Mouth
  - location: South Boston, Virginia
  - coordinates: 36°41′37″N 078°52′33″W
  - elevation: 318 ft (97 m)
- Length: 3.32 mi (5.34 km)
- Basin size: 4.07 square miles (10.5 km^{2})
- Discharge
  - location: Dan River
  - average: 5.18 cu ft/s (0.147 m^{3}/s) at mouth with Dan River

Basin features
- Progression: Dan River → Roanoke River → Albemarle Sound → Pamlico Sound → Atlantic Ocean
- River system: Roanoke River
- Tributaries
  - left: Woods Creek
  - right: unnamed tributaries
- Bridges: Parker Avenue, Hamilton Avenue, College Street, Westmoreland Street, Orleans Avenue, US 360, Hodges Avenue, Ash Avenue

Reedy Creek is a 3.32 mi (5.34 km) long 3rd order tributary to the Dan River in Halifax County, Virginia.

== Course ==
Reedy Creek rises at Loves Shop, Virginia, and then flows generally southeast to join the Dan River at South Boston.

== Watershed ==
Reedy Creek drains 4.07 square miles (10.5 km^{2}) of area, receives about 45.6 in/year of precipitation, has a wetness index of 410.22, and is about 42% forested.

== See also ==
- List of Virginia Rivers

== Watershed Maps ==
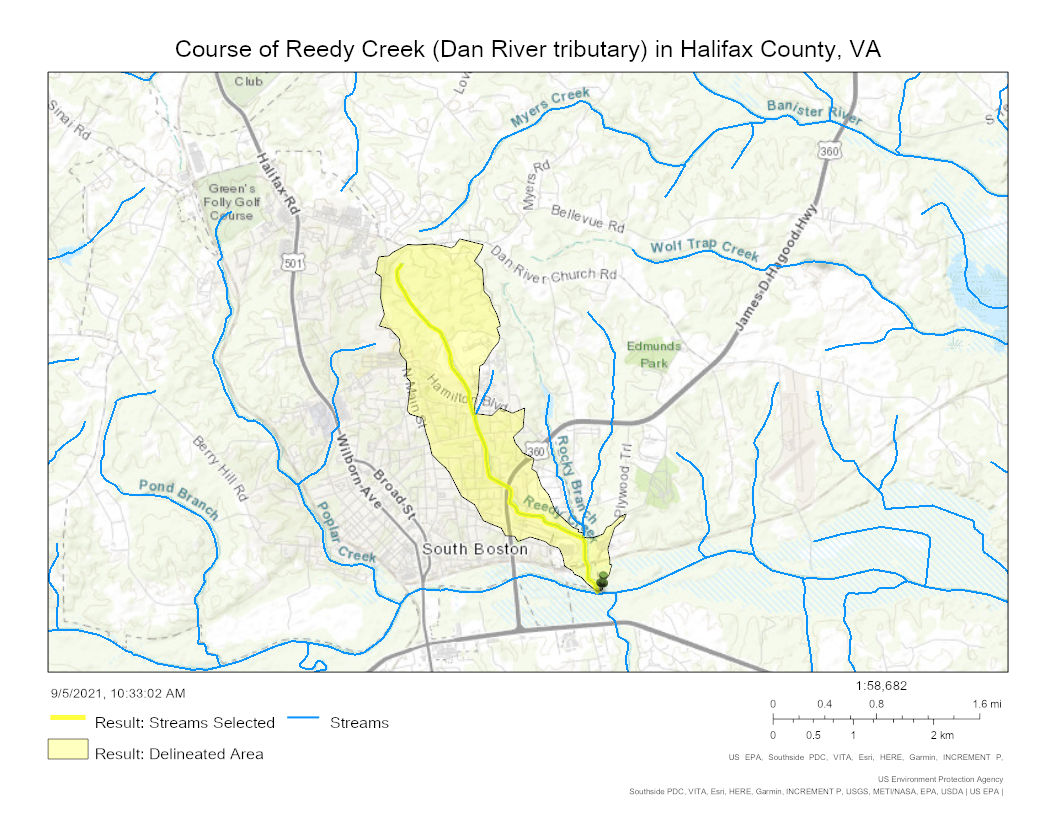
Course of Reedy Creek (Dan River tributary) in Halifax County, Virginia, USA

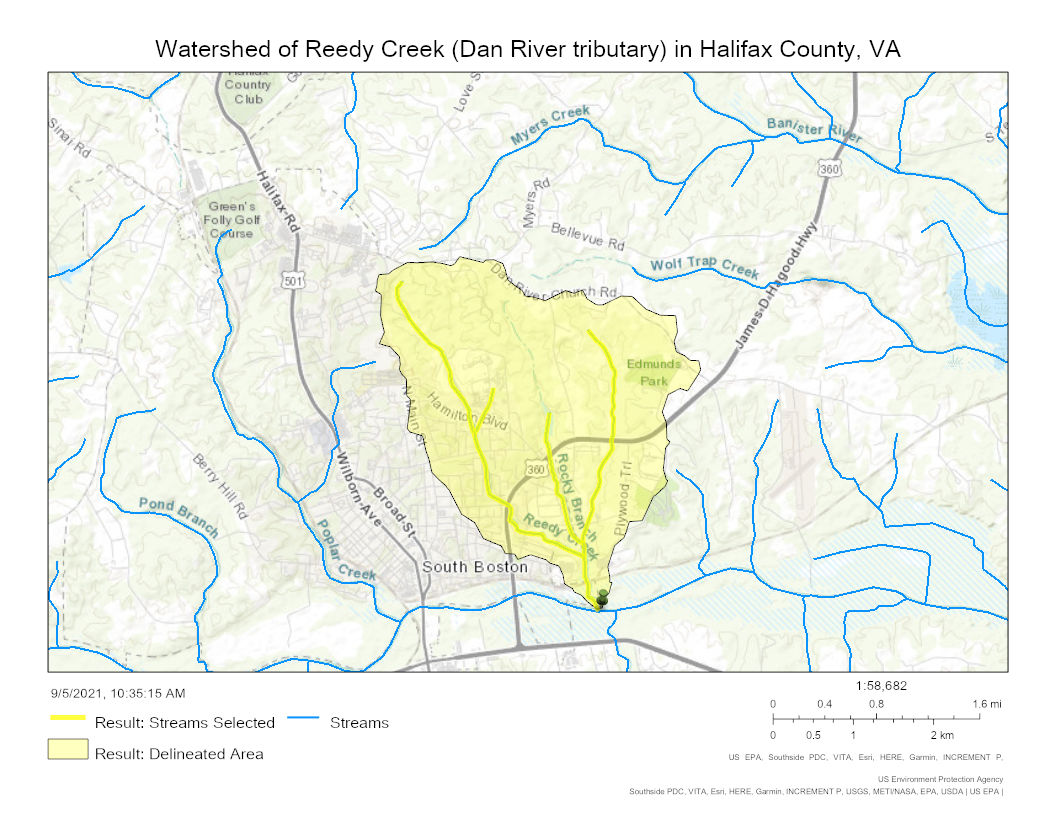
Watershed of Reedy Creek (Dan River tributary) in Halifax County, Virginia, USA
