= Carolina Slim =

American singer

Background information
- Also known as: Country Paul, Jammin' Jim, Lazy Slim Jim, Paul Howard
- Born: Edward P. Harris; August 22, 1923; Leasburg, North Carolina, United States
- Died: October 22, 1953 (aged 30) Newark, New Jersey, United States
- Genres: Piedmont blues
- Occupations: Guitarist, singer
- Instruments: Guitar, vocals
- Years active: 1950–1953
- Labels: Savoy, King

Edward P. Harris (August 22, 1923 – October 22, 1953), known as Carolina Slim, was an American Piedmont blues guitarist and singer. His best-known records are "Black Cat Trail" and "I'll Never Walk in Your Door". He used various pseudonyms during his brief recording career, including Country Paul, Jammin' Jim, Lazy Slim Jim and Paul Howard. He recorded 27 songs. Details of his life outside of his music career are scant, and the reasons for the use of different names are unclear.

== Biography ==
Harris was born in Leasburg, North Carolina. He learned to play the guitar from his father and was influenced by Lightnin' Hopkins and Blind Boy Fuller. He later found work as an itinerant musician around Durham, North Carolina.

In 1950, he relocated to Newark, New Jersey, and made his recording debut for Savoy Records, billed as Carolina Slim. His first single was "Black Chariot Blues" backed with "Mama's Boogie", recorded on July 24, 1950, and released by Acorn Records (Acorn 3015), a subsidiary of Savoy. In 1951 and 1952, he recorded eight tracks for King Records in New York City, this time using the name Country Paul. Henry Glover met Slim at these sessions and later commented that Slim was "a very sickly young man at the time". Slim's style blended Piedmont blues, prominent in songs such as "Carolina Boogie" and his cover version of Fuller's "Rag Mama Rag", with the influence of Hopkins steering him increasingly towards Texas blues. He occasionally incorporated a washboard as well as his guitar, as if to emphasise his Carolina roots.

His recordings were not hugely popular but sold in sufficient numbers for him to retain his recording contract. In June 1952, he recorded four more tracks for Savoy, which were his final recordings.

He died in Newark, New Jersey, from a heart attack, which occurred during surgery for a back complaint. He was 30 years old. In 2015 the Killer Blues Project placed a headstone for Carolina Slim at the Hyco Baptist church in Leasburg, North Carolina.

In 1994, Document Records released a compilation album, Complete Recorded Works 1950–1952, which incorporates all of his 27 tracks.

== Compilations ==
- Blues from the Cotton Fields (Sharp, 1960)
- Carolina Blues and Boogie (Flyright, 1972)
- Complete Recorded Works in Chronological Order 1950–1952 (Document, 1993)
- Carolina Blues 1950–1952 (EPM, 2003)

== See also ==
- List of Piedmont blues musicians
