= Poplar Creek (Dan River tributary) =

Stream in Virginia, USA

Poplar Creek Tributary to Dan River
- Location of Poplar Creek mouth Poplar Creek (Dan River tributary) (the United States)

Location
- Country: United States
- State: Virginia
- County: Halifax
- City: South Boston

Physical characteristics
- Source: unnamed tributary to Banister River divide
  - location: pond at Centerville, Virginia
  - coordinates: 36°44′06″N 078°55′39″W
  - elevation: 445 ft (136 m)
- Mouth
  - location: South Boston, Virginia
  - coordinates: 36°41′31″N 078°54′13″W
  - elevation: 320 ft (98 m)
- Length: 3.94 mi (6.34 km)
- Basin size: 5.02 square miles (13.0 km^{2})
- Discharge
  - location: Dan River
  - average: 6.34 cu ft/s (0.180 m^{3}/s) at mouth with Dan River

Basin features
- Progression: Dan River → Roanoke River → Albemarle Sound → Pamlico Sound → Atlantic Ocean
- River system: Roanoke River
- Tributaries
  - left: unnamed tributaries
  - right: unnamed tributaries
- Bridges: Sutphin Road, Porter Lane, Berry Hill Road, Summit Drive (x2)

Poplar Creek is a 3.94 mi (6.34 km) long 2nd order tributary to the Dan River in Halifax County, Virginia.

== Course ==
Poplar Creek rises in a pond at Centerville, Virginia, and then flows generally southeast to join the Dan River at South Boston.

== Watershed ==
Poplar Creek drains 5.02 square miles (13.0 km^{2}) of area, receives about 45.6 in/year of precipitation, has a wetness index of 392.35, and is about 29% forested.

== See also ==
- List of Virginia Rivers

== Watershed Maps ==
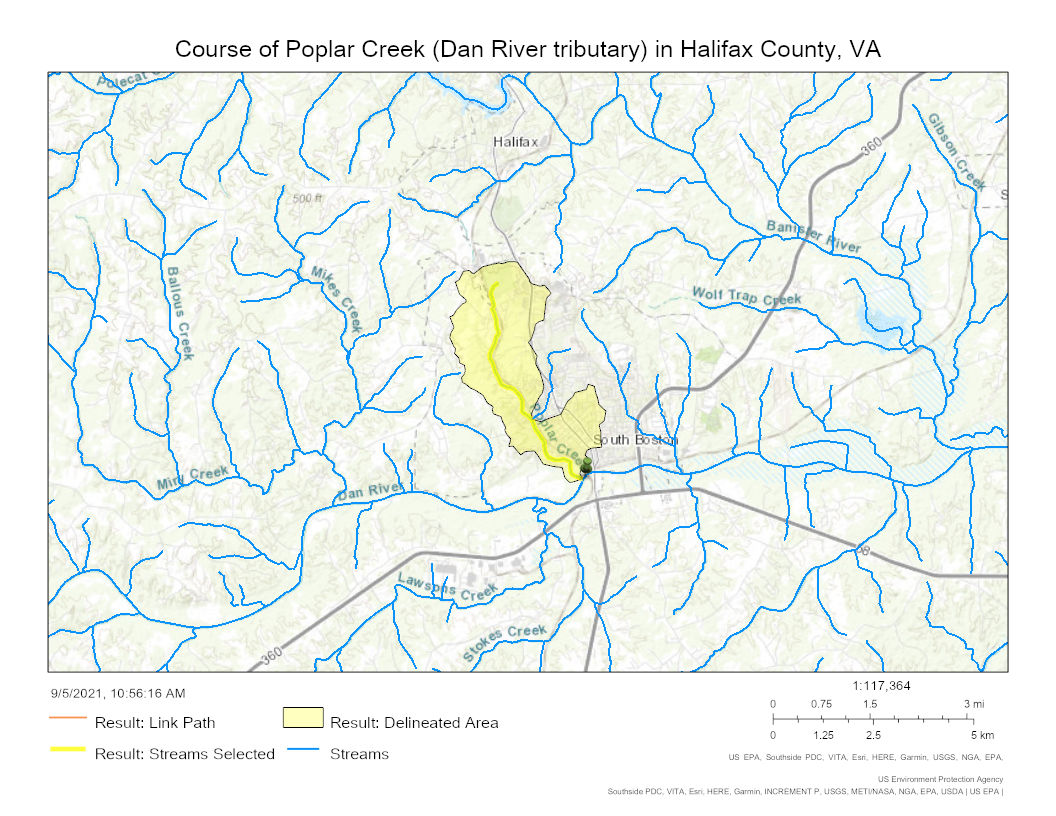
Course of Poplar Creek (Dan River tributary) in Halifax County, Virginia, USA

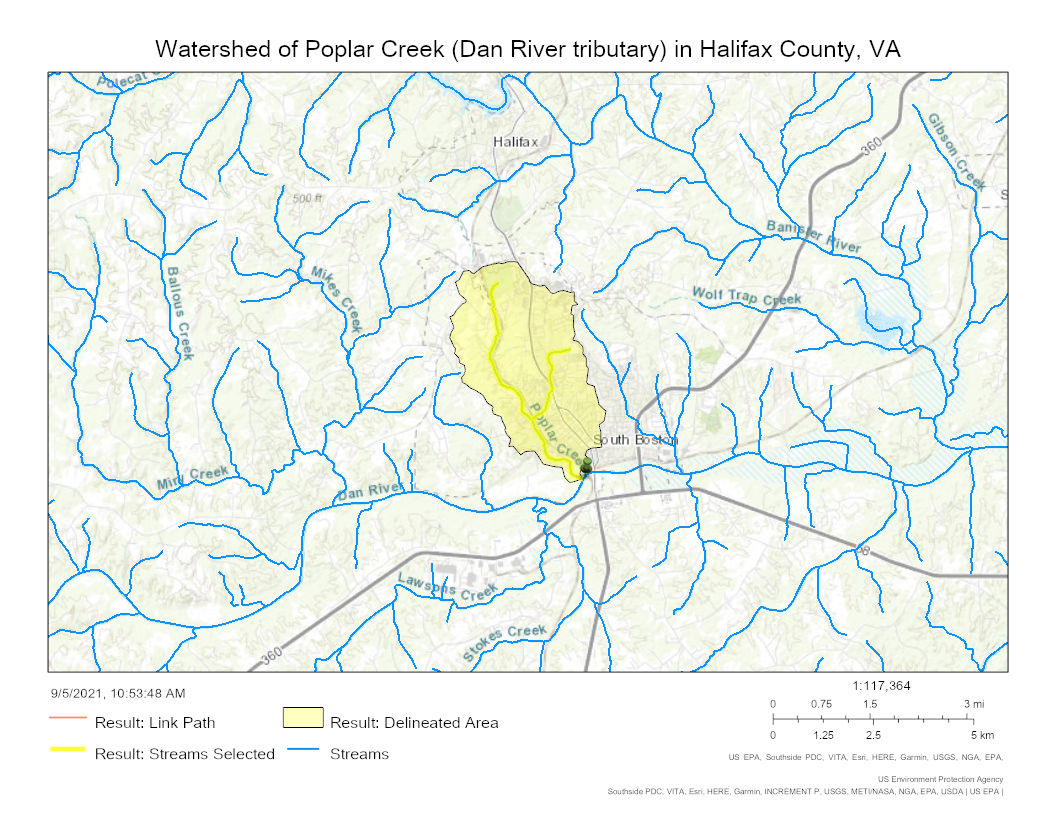
Watershed of Poplar Creek (Dan River tributary) in Halifax County, Virginia, USA
