= Storys Creek (Hyco River tributary) =

Stream in North Carolina, USA

Storys Creek Tributary to Hyco River
- Location of Storys Creek mouth Storys Creek (Hyco River tributary) (the United States)

Location
- Country: United States
- State: North Carolina
- County: Person

Physical characteristics
- Source: North Flat River divide
  - location: about 0.5 miles northeast of Roseville, North Carolina
  - coordinates: 36°21′56″N 079°01′49″W
  - elevation: 670 ft (200 m)
- Mouth: Hyco River
  - location: about 4 miles north-northwest of Woodsdale, North Carolina
  - coordinates: 36°31′33″N 078°58′38″W
  - elevation: 340 ft (100 m)
- Length: 12.51 mi (20.13 km)
- Basin size: 42.50 square miles (110.1 km^{2})
- Discharge
  - location: Hyco River
  - average: 50.24 cu ft/s (1.423 m^{3}/s) at mouth with Hyco River

Basin features
- Progression: Hyco River → Dan River → Roanoke River → Albemarle Sound
- River system: Roanoke River
- Tributaries
  - left: Satterfield Creek; Lick Branch
  - right: Marlowe Creek
- Waterbodies: Roxboro Lake; Chub Lake
- Bridges: Esther Road, Hickory Leaf Court, Dee Long Road, US 15, Semora Road, City Lake Road, Community House Road, Edwin Robertson Road

Storys Creek is a 12.51 mi (20.13 km) long 4th order tributary to the Hyco River in Person County, North Carolina.

== Variant names ==
According to the Geographic Names Information System, it has also been known historically as:

- Satterfield Creek
- Stony Creek
- Story Creek

== Course ==
Storys Creek rises about 0.5 miles northeast of Roseville, North Carolina, and then flows north-northeast to join the Hyco River about 4 miles north-northwest of Woodsdale.

== Watershed ==
Storys Creek drains 42.50 square miles (110.1 km^{2}) of area, receives about 46.4 in/year of precipitation, has a wetness index of 399.51, and is about 54% forested.
