= James Malone House =

Historic house in North Carolina, United States

- U.S. National Register of Historic Places
- Location within North Carolina Location within the United States
- Location: 7374 US 158, Leasburg, North Carolina
- Coordinates: 36°23′38″N 79°9′28″W
- Area: 1.7 acres (0.69 ha)
- Built: 1861
- Built by: Day, Thomas
- Architectural style: Italianate
- NRHP reference No.: 08000367
- Added to NRHP: April 30, 2008

James Malone House is a historic home located near Leasburg, Caswell County, North Carolina. It was built in 1861, and is a two-story, three bays wide, Italianate style frame house on a brick foundation. It has a hipped roof and features a two-story pedimented entrance porch and brick end chimneys. The interior and exterior features woodwork attributed to noted African-American cabinetmaker Thomas Day.

It was added to the National Register of Historic Places in 2008.
