= Sugartree Creek (South Hyco Creek tributary) =

Stream in North Carolina, USA

Sugartree Creek Tributary to South Hyco Creek
- Location of Sugartree Creek mouth Sugartree Creek (South Hyco Creek tributary) (the United States)

Location
- Country: United States
- State: North Carolina
- County: Caswell

Physical characteristics
- Source: Lynch Creek divide
  - location: pond at Prospect Hill, North Carolina
  - coordinates: 36°15′01″N 079°11′07″W
  - elevation: 695 ft (212 m)
- Mouth: South Hyco Creek
  - location: about 1 mile northwest of Gordonton, North Carolina
  - coordinates: 36°17′52″N 079°09′05″W
  - elevation: 485 ft (148 m)
- Length: 4.95 mi (7.97 km)
- Basin size: 4.51 square miles (11.7 km^{2})
- Discharge
  - location: South Hyco Creek
  - average: 5.70 cu ft/s (0.161 m^{3}/s) at mouth with South Hyco Creek

Basin features
- Progression: northeast
- River system: Roanoke River
- Tributaries
  - left: unnamed tributaries
  - right: unnamed tributaries
- Bridges: Painter Road, Wrenn Road

Sugartree Creek is a 4.95 mi (7.97 km) long 1st order tributary to South Hyco Creek in Caswell County, North Carolina.

== Course ==
Sugartree Creek rises in a pond in Prospect Hill, North Carolina and then flows northeast to join South Hyco Creek about 1 mile northwest of Gordonton.

== Watershed ==
Sugartree Creek drains 4.51 square miles (11.7 km^{2}) of area, receives about 46.6 in/year of precipitation, has a wetness index of 385.73, and is about 58% forested.
