= Grassy Creek (Dan River tributary) =

Stream in Virginia, USA

Grassy Creek Tributary to Dan River
- Location of Grassy Creek mouth Grassy Creek (Dan River tributary) (the United States)

Location
- Country: United States
- State: Virginia
- County: Halifax

Physical characteristics
- Source: unnamed tributary to Stokes Creek divide
  - location: about 0.5 miles (0.80 km) west of Centerville, Virginia
  - coordinates: 36°38′33″N 078°53′03″W
  - elevation: 458 ft (140 m)
- Mouth
  - location: about 2 miles (3.2 km) north-northwest of Omega, Virginia
  - coordinates: 36°41′28″N 078°49′01″W
  - elevation: 318 ft (97 m)
- Length: 4.45 mi (7.16 km)
- Basin size: 6.53 square miles (16.9 km^{2})
- Discharge
  - location: Dan River
  - average: 8.15 cu ft/s (0.231 m^{3}/s) at mouth with Dan River

Basin features
- Progression: Dan River → Roanoke River → Albemarle Sound → Pamlico Sound → Atlantic Ocean
- River system: Roanoke River
- Tributaries
  - left: unnamed tributaries
  - right: unnamed tributaries
- Bridges: E Hyco Road, US 58

Grassy Creek is a 4.45-mile-long (7.16 km) 2nd order tributary to the Dan River in Halifax County, Virginia.

== Course ==
Grassy Creek rises about 0.5 miles (0.80 km) west of Centerville, Virginia, and then flows northeast to join the Dan River about 2 miles (3.2 km) northwest of Omega.

== Watershed ==
Grassy Creek drains 6.53 square miles (16.9 km^{2}) of area, receives about 45.7 in/year (116 cm/year) of precipitation, has a wetness index of 421.95, and is about 54% forested.

== See also ==
- List of Virginia Rivers

== Watershed Maps ==
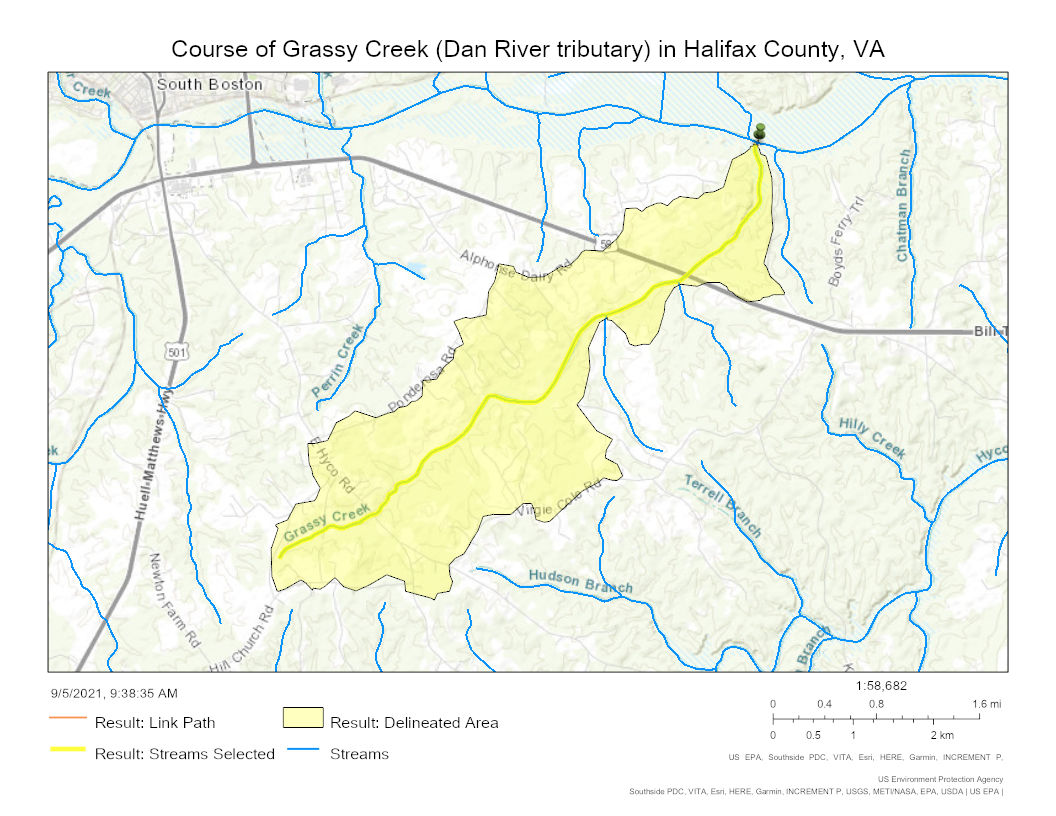
Course of Grassy Creek (Dan River tributary) in Halifax County, Virginia, USA

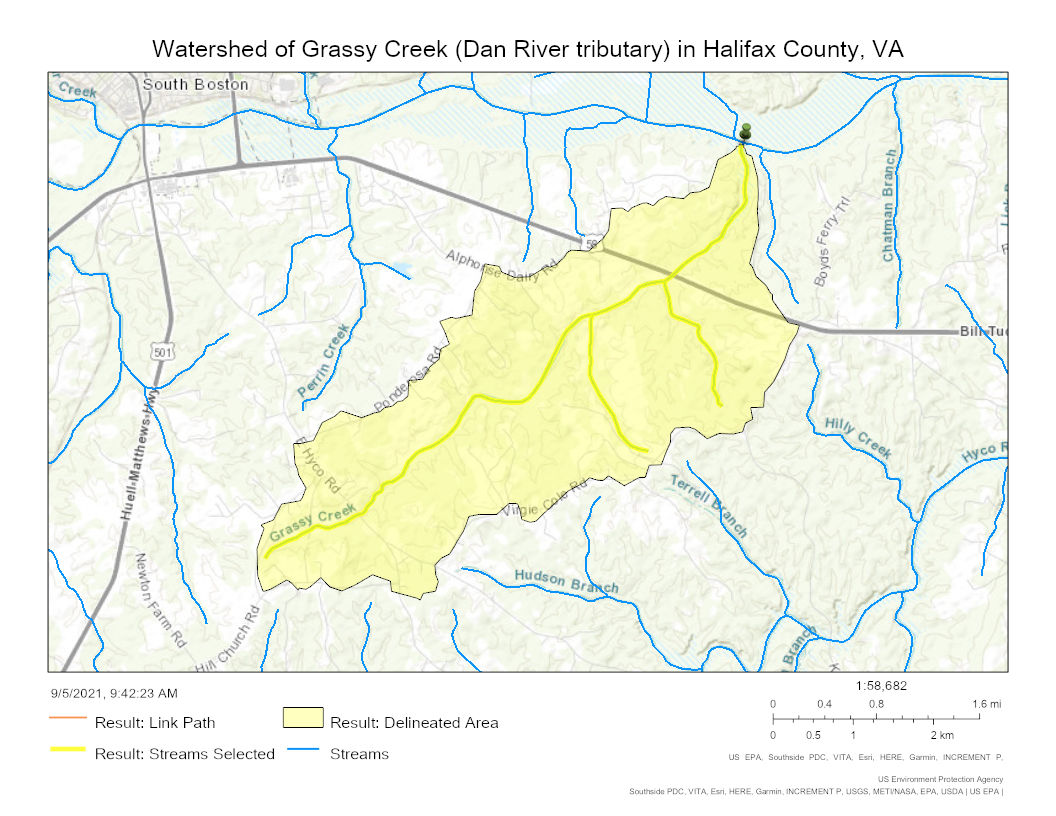
Watershed of Grassy Creek (Dan River tributary) in Halifax County, Virginia, USA
