= Cub Creek (Tennessee River tributary) =

Stream in Decatur County, Tennessee, United States

Coordinates: 35.6992338°N 88.0328105°W

Cub Creek is a stream in Decatur County, Tennessee, United States. It is a tributary to the Tennessee River.

Cub Creek was named for the fact bears were hunted there by pioneers.
