= Hilly Creek =

Stream in Virginia, U.S.

Hilly Creek Tributary to Hyco River
- Location of Hilly Creek mouth Hilly Creek (the United States)

Location
- Country: United States
- State: Virginia
- County: Halifax

Physical characteristics
- Source: Grassy Creek divide
  - location: pond at Omega, Virginia
  - coordinates: 36°40′08″N 078°48′50″W
  - elevation: 428 ft (130 m)
- Mouth: Hyco River at John H. Kerr Reservoir
  - location: about 1.5 miles south-southeast of Omega, Virginia
  - coordinates: 36°38′57″N 078°47′31″W
  - elevation: 300 ft (91 m)
- Length: 1.95 mi (3.14 km)
- Basin size: 1.63 square miles (4.2 km^{2})
- Discharge
  - location: Hyco River
  - average: 2.14 cu ft/s (0.061 m^{3}/s) at mouth with Hyco River

Basin features
- Progression: generally southeast
- River system: Roanoke River
- Tributaries
  - left: unnamed tributaries
  - right: unnamed tributaries
- Bridges: none

Hilly Creek is a 1.95 mi (3.14 km) long 1st order tributary to the Hyco River in Halifax County, Virginia. Flat Branch joins Hyco River in John H. Kerr Reservoir (Buggs Island Reservoir in Virginia). This is the only stream of this name in the United States.

== Course ==
Hilly Creek rises in a pond at Omega, Virginia and then flows southeast to join the Hyco River in John H. Kerr Reservoir about 1.5 miles south-southeast of Omega.

== Watershed ==
Hilly Creek drains 1.63 square miles (4.2 km^{2}) of area, receives about 45.6 in/year of precipitation, has a wetness index of 370.38, and is about 63% forested.

== See also ==
- List of rivers of Virginia
