= Olive Hill, North Carolina =

Township in North Carolina, US

Coordinates: 36.396°N 79.091°W

Olive Hill is a township located in Person County, North Carolina, United States. It has a population of approximately 2,840 people. Olive Hill is home to a public park.
