= Cub Creek (Osage River tributary) =

Stream in the US state of Missouri

Cub Creek is a stream in northern Miller County in the U.S. state of Missouri. It is a tributary of the Osage River.

The stream headwaters arise southeast of the community of Marys Home (at 38°18′14″N 92°20′53″W) and it flows generally southeast before turning east in a broad bend to enter the Osage (at 38°16′09″N 92°18′17″W). The confluence is about two miles north of Capps and two miles west of St. Elizabeth.

Cub Creek most likely was named for bear cubs in the area.

== See also ==
- List of rivers of Missouri
