= Hyco River =

Stream in North Carolina, USA

Hyco River Tributary to Dan River
- Native name: Hiḳaatmani (Tutelo)

Location
- Country: United States
- State: North Carolina; Virginia
- County: Person (NC); Halifax (VA)

Physical characteristics
- Source: confluence of Hyco Creek and South Hyco Creek
  - location: Hyco Lake
  - coordinates: 36°28′59″N 079°05′44″W
  - elevation: 410 ft (120 m)
- Mouth: Dan River
  - location: John H. Kerr Reservoir about 3 east-southeast of South Boston, Virginia
  - coordinates: 36°41′02″N 078°43′55″W
  - elevation: 300 ft (91 m)
- Length: 33.55 mi (53.99 km)
- Basin size: 429.09 square miles (1,111.3 km^{2})
- Discharge
  - location: Dan River (John H. Kerr Reservoir)
  - average: 407.14 cu ft/s (11.529 m^{3}/s) at mouth with Dan River

Basin features
- Progression: Dan River → Roanoke River → Albemarle Sound
- River system: Roanoke River
- Tributaries
  - left: Hyco Creek; Cane Creek; Powells Creek; Coleman Creek; Halfway Creek; Hudson Branch; Terrell Branch; Hilly Creek
  - right: South Hyco Creek; Sargents Creek; Ghent Creek; Storys Creek; Castle Creek; Bowes Branch; Mayo Creek; Dry Creek; Bluewing Creek; Larkin Branch; Pensions Branch; Flat Branch; Morris Branch
- Waterbodies: Hyco Lake; After Bay Reservoir; John H. Kerr Reservoir
- Bridges: Woodsdale Road, Bethel Hill Road, US 501, E Hyco Road, Kingwoods Road, Buckshoal Road, US 58

The Hyco River (from Tutelo Hyco-oto-moni or Hiḳaatmani 'Turkey buzzard river') is a tributary of the Dan River, which is a tributary of the Roanoke River. All three rivers flow through the U.S. states of North Carolina and Virginia. In Person County, North Carolina the Hyco River is impounded by a dam, forming Hyco Lake. The main part of the river flows through Allensville, North Carolina (a township of Roxboro), on Gentry's Ridge and Mill Creek roads as it flows into Virginia townships such as Alton, Virginia, and Cluster Springs, Virginia, then combining with the Dan River.

According to the USGS the Hyco River has been known by the variant names Hicootomony Creek, Hy Coyee River, Hyco Creek, and Hyco-o-tee River.

== Etymology ==
In 1728, William Byrd II was the chief commissioner for Virginia when the boundary line between North Carolina and Virginia was run by surveyors and commissioners from each state. Byrd hired two Saponi natives from Fort Christanna for guides and hunters for the expedition. One of the Saponi became ill and returned, but the other, named Bearskin, provided "nearly all that we have of the language and folklore of the Saponi tribe." The language of the Saponi was likely identical to or a dialect of the Tutelo language. Bearskin gave the local name for what is now known as Hyco River as Hyco-oto-moni, meaning Turkey buzzard river.

== See also ==
- List of rivers of Virginia
