= Leasburg, North Carolina =

Community in North Carolina, US

Coordinates: 36°23′41″N 79°09′16″W

Leasburg is an unincorporated community in and the former county seat of Caswell County, North Carolina, United States. The community has a partial presence in Person County. It was named in honor of longtime resident William Lea and is located along US 158 and NC 119 near Hyco Lake.

Leasburg is also the name of a Caswell County township. The township's population was 1,168 at the 2020 census.

== History ==
When Caswell County was created in 1777, the area that would become Leasburg was named as the county seat; however, a county courthouse was not built on the site until 1784, after the American Revolutionary War. When the area around the courthouse began to develop, the community decided to incorporate. The town of Leasburg was officially recognized by the North Carolina General Assembly in 1788.

When the eastern section of Caswell County split and became Person County, a more geographically central location for the Caswell county seat was needed; so, in 1792 the courthouse was moved to an area which became known as "Caswell Court House," which later changed its name to Yanceyville.

Leasburg continued to develop after the courthouse relocation and eventually became known as the regional center for education. Numerous mills, factories, and farms prospered in the town until competition from nearby Durham after the Civil War doomed the area's tobacco industry.

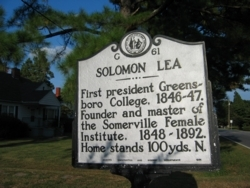
Solomon Lea Historical Marker in Leasburg

While the Civil War left Leasburg devastated, many antebellum residences still remain. Famous former residents of Leasburg include Solomon Lea, the son of William Lea and the first president of Greensboro College, and Jacob Thompson, who served under President James Buchanan as Secretary of the Interior. Leasburg was also the birthplace of the short-lived Piedmont blues musician, Carolina Slim.

The Garland-Buford House and James Malone House are listed on the National Register of Historic Places.

=== Caswell County Speedway ===
Caswell County Speedway was once in operation in Leasburg and offered dirt track kart racing. The 1/5 mile track's ruins are still present and can be seen from Solomon Lea Road.

== Nearby communities and municipalities ==
- Yanceyville
- Milton
- Prospect Hill
- Roxboro
- Semora
