= Cluster Springs, Virginia =

- Census-designated place
- Location within Virginia Location within the United States
- Coordinates: 36°37′16″N 78°55′18″W
- Country: United States
- State: Virginia
- County: Halifax

Area
  - Total: 8.6 sq mi (22.3 km^{2})
  - Land: 8.6 sq mi (22.2 km^{2})
  - Water: 0.039 sq mi (0.1 km^{2})
- Elevation: 495 ft (151 m)

Population (2020)
  - Total: 718
  - Density: 95/sq mi (36.5/km^{2})
- Time zone: UTC-5 (Eastern (EST))
  - Summer (DST): UTC-4 (EDT)
- ZIP code: 24535
- FIPS code: 51-17776
- GNIS feature ID: 1492788

Cluster Springs is an unincorporated community and census-designated place (CDP) in Halifax County, Virginia, United States. As of the 2020 census, Cluster Springs had a population of 718.

== Geography ==
The CDP is located in southern Halifax County, along U.S. Route 501, which leads north 5 miles (8 km) to South Boston and south 18 miles (29 km) to Roxboro, North Carolina.

According to the U.S. Census Bureau, the CDP has a total area of 8.6 square miles (22.3 km^{2}), of which 0.03 square miles (0.08 km^{2}), or 0.35%, are water. It is drained by tributaries of the Dan River and is part of the Roanoke River watershed.

== Demographics ==
Historical population
Census	Pop.	Note	%±
2010	811		—
2020	718		−11.5%
U.S. Decennial Census; 2010 2020

Cluster Springs was first listed as a census designated place in the 2010 U.S. census.
