= Semora, North Carolina =

- Unincorporated community
- Location within the state of North Carolina
- Coordinates: 36°29′55″N 79°08′56″W
- Country: United States
- State: North Carolina
- County: Caswell and Person
- Time zone: UTC-5 (Eastern (EST))
  - Summer (DST): UTC-4 (EDT)
- ZIP codes: 27343

Semora is an unincorporated community in Caswell County, North Carolina, United States. It lies just northwest of Hyco Lake and has some presence in Person County. Semora is home to one of the oldest churches in North Carolina, the Red House Presbyterian Church.

Neighboring North Carolina communities and municipalities include: Yanceyville, Milton, Roxboro, Leasburg, and Blanch. Alton, Virginia is a neighbor to the north.

The population was 1,656 at the 2020 census.

In addition to the Red House Presbyterian Church, Wildwood is listed on the National Register of Historic Places.
