= Prospect Hill, North Carolina =

- Unincorporated community
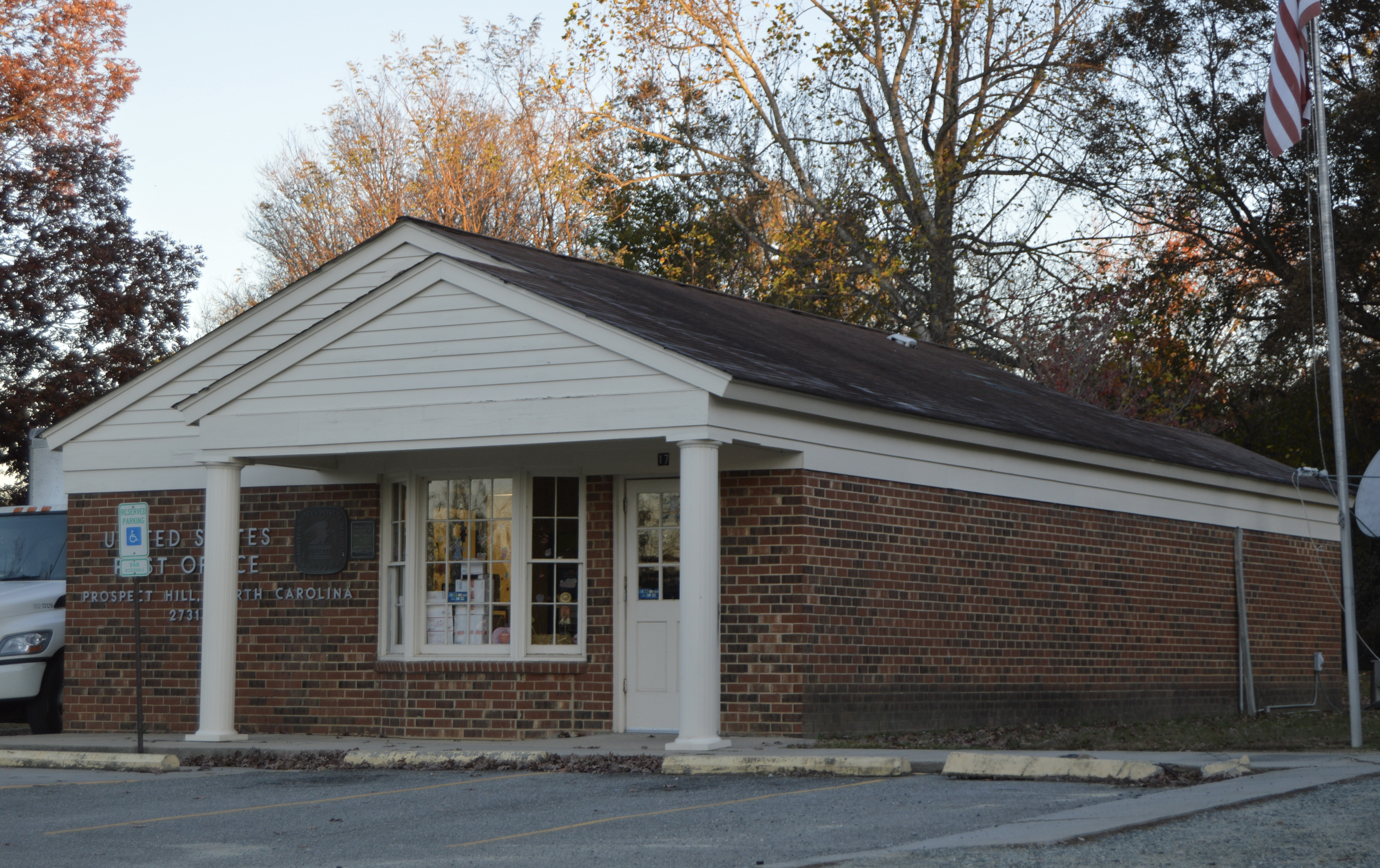
- Post office

- Location within the state of North Carolina
- Coordinates: 36°14′57″N 79°11′27″W
- Country: United States
- State: North Carolina
- County: Caswell
- Time zone: UTC-5 (Eastern (EST))
  - Summer (DST): UTC-4 (EDT)
- Area code: 336

Prospect Hill is a small unincorporated community in Hightowers Township, Caswell County, North Carolina, United States. It lies at the intersection of North Carolina Highways 49 and 86. It is in extreme southeastern Caswell County.

Warren House and Warren's Store were listed on the National Register of Historic Places in 1973.

Sugartree Creek, a tributary to South Hyco Creek, rises in this community.
