= Hyco Lake =

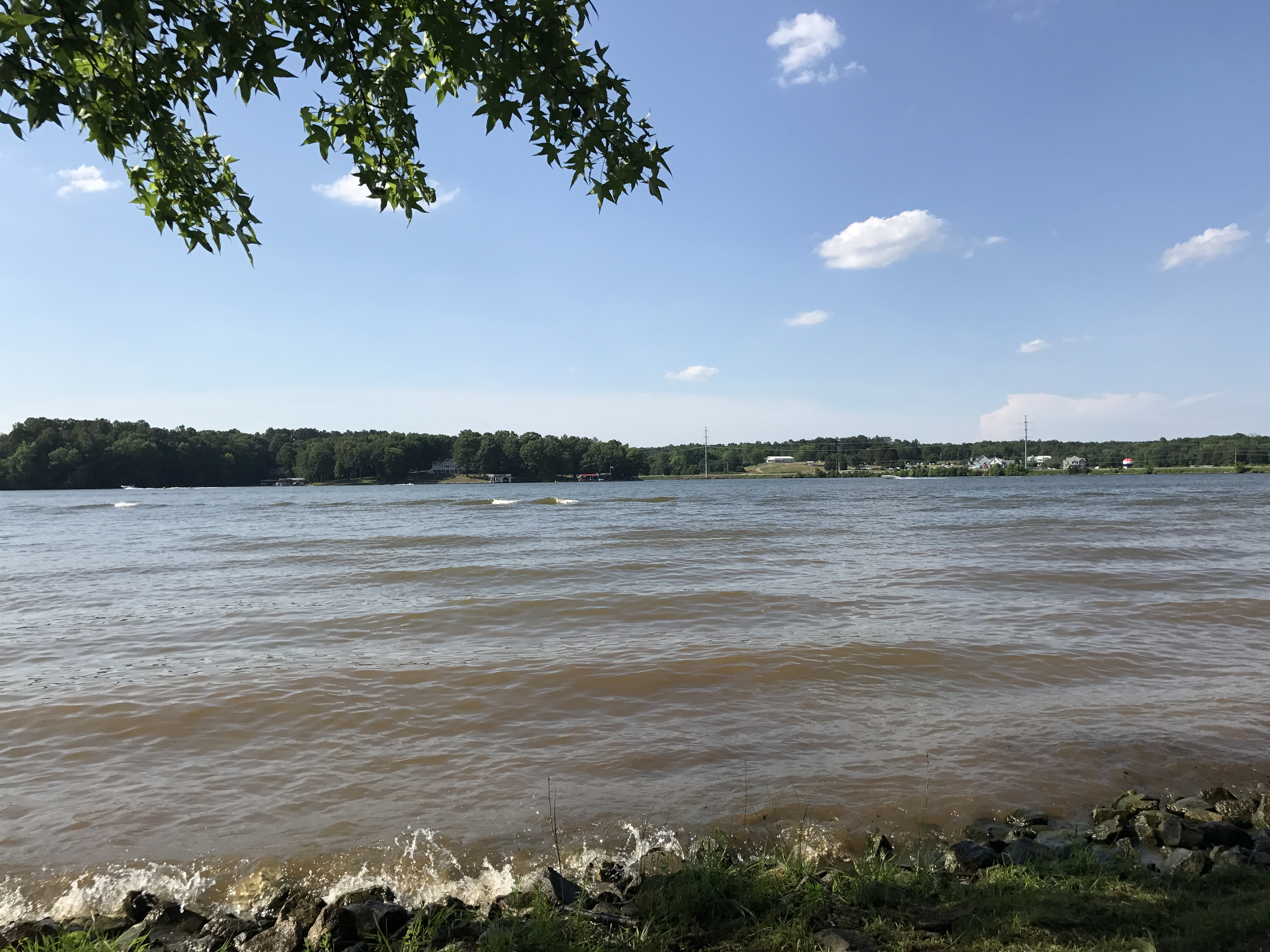

- Location within North Carolina Location within the United States
- Location: Person / Caswell counties, North Carolina, United States
- Coordinates: 36°30′46″N 079°02′49″W
- Type: Reservoir
- Primary inflows: Hyco River
- Catchment area: 189 sq mi (490 km^{2})
- Basin countries: United States
- Surface area: 3,750 acres (1,520 ha)
- Surface elevation: 411 ft (125 m)

Hyco Lake is a reservoir in Person and Caswell counties, North Carolina. It is the area's main destination for fishing, boating, water skiing, wake boarding, and recreation and is the larger of Person County's two lakes, the other being Mayo Lake. The lake was formed from the Hyco River and has three main tributaries; North Hyco Creek, South Hyco Creek, and Cobbs Creek. Interest in the lake for vacation homes has created numerous homes along its shores with relatively high property values. Over 1500 homes have been constructed around the lake with approximately 800 occupied year-round. It runs through the following municipalities: Semora, Leasburg, and the city of Roxboro located about ten miles (16 km) from the lake.

The name Hyco is derived from "Hicotaminy" which is what the native Indians called the area due to the number of turkey buzzards which were and still are in the area. Hicotaminy means "great turkey buzzard".

== History ==
Hyco Lake was constructed in the early 1960s by Carolina Power and Light Company (now Duke Energy Progress) as a cooling reservoir for their power generating plant. Since its establishment, the lake and its recreation park have been under the jurisdiction of the Person-Caswell Lake Authority. The water is regulated by the North Carolina Department of Environment and Natural Resources. Duke Energy Progress owns the land surrounding the lake up to the 420-foot (130 m) above-sea-level mark. The lake covers 3,750 acres (1,520 ha), containing about 25 billion US gallons (95,000,000 m^{3}) of water, with 120 miles (190 km) of shoreline. Hurricane Hilda elevated Hyco Lake's water level.

== 2025 flood ==
On July 6–7, 2025, Hyco Lake experienced major flooding following heavy rainfall from the remnants of Tropical Storm Chantal. After making landfall near Litchfield Beach, South Carolina, on July 6, the weakening tropical cyclone moved slowly across central North Carolina, producing more than 7 inches (180 mm) of rainfall in portions of Person County within a 24-hour period.

Rapid runoff from the lake's 189-square-mile (490 km^{2}) watershed caused Hyco Lake to crest at approximately 16.5 feet (5.0 m) on July 7. The flooding damaged homes, boat docks, boathouses, and other shoreline structures throughout Person and Caswell counties. Numerous roads surrounding the lake were flooded or washed out, while floating debris and displaced watercraft created navigation hazards after the water receded.

In the weeks following the flood, the Person-Caswell Lake Authority temporarily closed the lake to motorized boating while recovery efforts removed debris and evaluated submerged hazards. The North Carolina Collaboratory partnered with the Lake Authority and funded a sidescan sonar survey conducted by the University of North Carolina Wilmington's Center for Marine Science. Conducted from July 28 to July 31, 2025, the survey mapped much of the lakebed to identify submerged hazards to navigation, public health, and safety created by the flooding. The resulting data guided cleanup operations and contributed to the lake's reopening to recreational boating on August 16, 2025.

Although no fatalities occurred on Hyco Lake itself, the flooding formed part of a broader regional disaster in central North Carolina that resulted in multiple deaths, hundreds of road closures, and numerous water rescues.
