= Dan River (Virginia) =

River in the U.S. states of North Carolina and Virginia

Dan
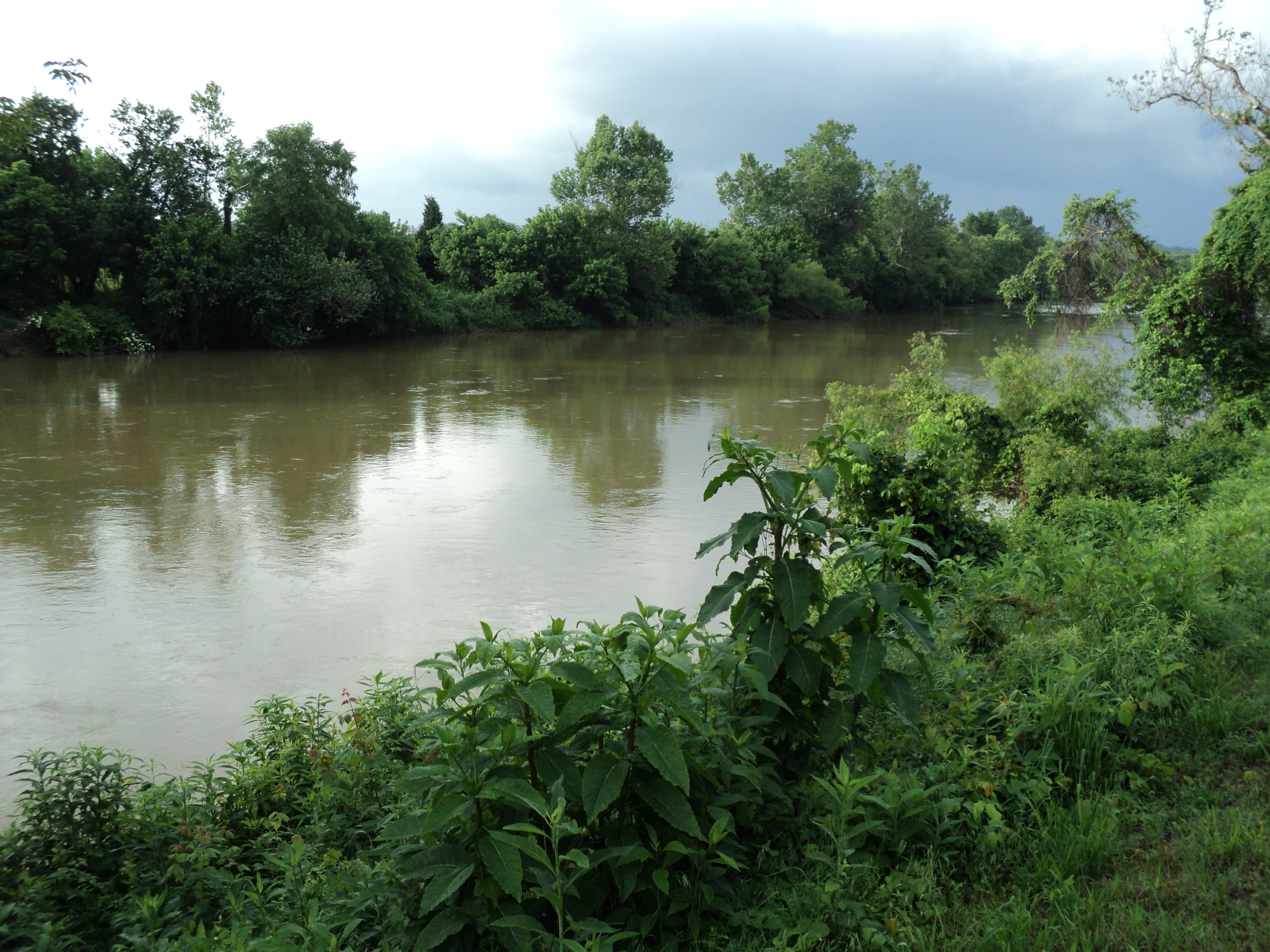
- View of the river at Danville

- Location of the river's mouth Dan River (Virginia) (the United States)

Location
- Country: United States
- States: Virginia, North Carolina

Physical characteristics
- Source
  - location: near Meadows of Dan
  - coordinates: 36.78401°N 80.35551°W
  - elevation: 3,170 ft (970 m)
- Mouth: Kerr Lake (Roanoke River)
  - location: Staunton River State Park
  - coordinates: 36.69232°N 78.64490°W
  - elevation: 300 ft (91 m)
- Length: 214 mi (344 km)
- Basin size: 3,300 mi^{2} (8,500 km^{2})
- Discharge
  - location: Kerr Lake
  - average: 4,136.06 cu ft/s (117.120 m^{3}/s)

Basin features
- Progression: Roanoke River→ Albemarle Sound
- Tributaries
  - left: Ivy Creek, Roaring Creek, Coxes Branch, Lickskillet Branch, Little Dan River, Peters Creek, Bonds Branch, Newman Branch, Seven Island Creek, Snow Creek, Blackies Branch, Reed Creek, Beaver Island Creek, Mayo River, Buffalo Creek, Matrimony Creek, Smith River, Covenant Branch, Cascade Creek, Trotters Creek, Childress Creek, Sandy River, Fall Creek, Barkers Branch, Hances Branch, Coy Creek, Cane Creek, Mineral Springs Branch, Sandy Creek, Wolfe Creek, Barker Creek, Double Creek, Byrds Branch, Toby Creek, Little Toby Creek, Birch Creek, Miry Creek, Pond Branch, Poplar Creek, Reedy Creek, Banister River, Peter Creek, Line Branch
  - right: Quaker Field Branch, Toggle Creek, Mill Creek, Round Meadow, Squall Creek, Squirrel Creek, Fall Creek, Big Branch, Big Creek, Double Creek, Cascade Creek, Indian Creek, Scott Branch, Town Fork Creek, Belews Creek, Hogans Creek, Jacobs Creek, Massy Creek, Roach Creek, Fishing Creek, Town Creek, Rock Creek, White Oak Creek, Williamson Creek, Wolf Island Creek, Jackson Branch, Pumpkin Creek, Hogans Creek, Moon Creek, Rattlesnake Creek, Little Rattlesnake Creek, Country Line Creek, Winns Creek, Powells Creek, Chalmers Creek, Locust Creek, Lawsons Creek, Perrin Creek, Grassy Creek, Chatman Branch, Lick Branch, Hyco River, Aarons Creek
- Waterbodies: Cockrum Millpond; Kerr Lake

The Dan River flows 214 miles (344 km) in the U.S. states of North Carolina and Virginia. It rises in Patrick County, Virginia, and crosses the state border into Stokes County, North Carolina. It then flows into Rockingham County. From there it flows back into Virginia through Pittsylvania County before reentering North Carolina near the border between Caswell County and Rockingham County. It flows into northern Caswell County and then back into southern Virginia (briefly Pittsylvania County, then into Halifax County) and finally into Kerr Reservoir on the Roanoke River.

The name of the river was first recorded by William Byrd II in 1728, during an expedition to survey the Virginia border, though Byrd did not explain the reason for the name. A variant name is "South Branch Roanoke River".

In 2014, a large amount of coal ash, a byproduct of coal combustion, spilled into the lower Dan River in Rockingham County, near Eden, North Carolina, prompting a cleanup process costing an estimated $300 million.

Dan River is also the name of the southeastern political district of Pittsylvania County, where a small section of the river serves as the boundary between Pittsylvania County and the city of Danville.

On June 25, 2021, the North Carolina General Assembly passed a law adding the river's paddle trail in Stokes and Rockingham Counties as its eleventh State Trail.

== See also ==
- List of rivers of North Carolina
- List of rivers of Virginia
