= 1952 United States presidential election in North Carolina =

- November 4, 1952

All 14 North Carolina votes to the Electoral College

Nominee	Adlai Stevenson	Dwight D. Eisenhower
Party	Democratic	Republican
Home state	Illinois	New York
Running mate	John Sparkman	Richard Nixon
Electoral vote	14	0
Popular vote	652,803	558,107
Percentage	53.91%	46.09%

Stevenson
50–60%
60–70%
70–80%
80–90%
90–100%
Eisenhower
50–60%
60–70%
70–80%
President before election
Harry S. Truman
Democratic
Elected President
Dwight D. Eisenhower
Republican

The 1952 United States presidential election in North Carolina took place on November 4, 1952, as part of the 1952 United States presidential election. North Carolina voters chose 14 representatives, or electors, to the Electoral College, who voted for president and vice president.

As a former Confederate state, North Carolina had a history of Jim Crow laws, disfranchisement of its African-American population and dominance of the Democratic Party in state politics. However, unlike the Deep South, the Republican Party had sufficient historic Unionist white support from the mountains and northwestern Piedmont to gain one-third of the statewide vote total in most general elections, where turnout was higher than elsewhere in the former Confederacy due substantially to the state's early abolition of the poll tax in 1920. Like Virginia, Tennessee and Oklahoma, the relative strength of Republican opposition meant that North Carolina did not have statewide white primaries, although certain counties did use the white primary. This persistent local Republican threat from mountain Unionist descendants meant that there was never any question of the state Democratic party bolting to support Strom Thurmond in 1948. Additionally, the greatest support for Thurmond was found in middle- and upper-class urban areas of the Piedmont, so that the best Dixiecrat counties correlated strongly with the largest urban areas.

During Truman's second term, there was little satisfaction in North Carolina with the President, due to unresolved Civil Rights struggles, strikes, and evidence of corruption in the Democratic Party. At the beginning of the presidential campaign, though, there was no indication that the state would not back new Democratic nominee Adlai Stevenson, and all state Democrats endorsed him. Stevenson began his campaign in North Carolina in late July, but did not return to the state as it was felt by September that Republican nominee and Columbia University President Dwight D. Eisenhower had less chance than in Florida, Texas or the Dixiecrat states of Louisiana and South Carolina. Stevenson was helped by the fact that, much more than in other Southern States, North Carolina's press largely endorsed him over Eisenhower, although in mid-October one of the two largest papers was endorsing the Republican. Nonetheless, polls ten days before the election suggested Stevenson was very likely to carry the state due to the party loyalty created by viable mountain and northwest Piedmont Republican opposition.

Because the Black Belt of the state, unlike the economically conservative Black Belts of the Deep South, was economically more liberal than the Piedmont region where the establishment Democratic faction led since 1929 by O. Max Gardner was based, its entirely white electorate stayed exceedingly loyal to Stevenson – much more so than the Black Belts of other Outer South states. This Democratic loyalty extended to the Outer Banks, which had been a center of anti-Catholic voting when Herbert Hoover carried the state in 1928, so that apart from a seven-vote win in Brunswick County, every county Eisenhower carried was in the urban Piedmont or traditionally GOP mountains. Thus, unlike Texas, Florida and Virginia, urban middle-class Republican voting was inadequate to carry the state for Eisenhower.

North Carolina was ultimately won by Governor Stevenson with 53.91 percent of the popular vote, against Eisenhower with 46.09 percent of the popular vote. Stevenson ran with Alabama Senator John Sparkman and Eisenhower with California Senator Richard Nixon.

== Results ==
1952 United States presidential election in North Carolina
Party	Candidate	Votes	%
Democratic	Adlai Stevenson	652,803	53.91%
Republican	Dwight D. Eisenhower	558,107	46.09%
Total votes		1,210,910	100%

=== Results by county ===
County	Adlai Stevenson Democratic		Dwight D. Eisenhower Republican		Margin		Total
County	#	%	#	%	#	%	Total
Alamance	13,402	54.06%	11,388	45.94%	2,014	8.12%	24,790
Alexander	2,665	42.56%	3,597	57.44%	-932	-14.88%	6,262
Alleghany	1,809	50.28%	1,789	49.72%	20	0.56%	3,598
Anson	4,143	69.21%	1,843	30.79%	2,300	38.42%	5,986
Ashe	4,536	49.85%	4,563	50.15%	-27	-0.30%	9,099
Avery	964	20.56%	3,725	79.44%	-2,761	-58.88%	4,689
Beaufort	5,429	69.31%	2,404	30.69%	3,025	38.62%	7,833
Bertie	3,557	90.26%	384	9.74%	3,173	80.52%	3,941
Bladen	3,506	67.22%	1,710	32.78%	1,796	34.44%	5,216
Brunswick	2,951	49.94%	2,958	50.06%	-7	-0.12%	5,909
Buncombe	22,425	47.85%	24,444	52.15%	-2,019	-4.30%	46,869
Burke	7,732	41.03%	11,113	58.97%	-3,381	-17.94%	18,845
Cabarrus	9,140	37.78%	15,053	62.22%	-5,913	-24.44%	24,193
Caldwell	7,533	45.13%	9,160	54.87%	-1,627	-9.74%	16,693
Camden	996	74.55%	340	25.45%	656	49.10%	1,336
Carteret	4,280	59.06%	2,967	40.94%	1,313	18.12%	7,247
Caswell	2,597	72.75%	973	27.25%	1,624	45.50%	3,570
Catawba	11,554	40.73%	16,814	59.27%	-5,260	-18.54%	28,368
Chatham	4,303	54.41%	3,606	45.59%	697	8.82%	7,909
Cherokee	3,363	51.02%	3,228	48.98%	135	2.04%	6,591
Chowan	1,448	72.95%	537	27.05%	911	45.90%	1,985
Clay	1,439	49.93%	1,443	50.07%	-4	-0.14%	2,882
Cleveland	9,709	56.07%	7,606	43.93%	2,103	12.14%	17,315
Columbus	6,941	69.81%	3,001	30.19%	3,940	39.62%	9,942
Craven	6,092	68.34%	2,822	31.66%	3,270	36.68%	8,914
Cumberland	8,839	54.18%	7,474	45.82%	1,365	8.36%	16,313
Currituck	1,471	78.04%	414	21.96%	1,057	56.08%	1,885
Dare	959	55.56%	767	44.44%	192	11.12%	1,726
Davidson	10,931	43.33%	14,299	56.67%	-3,368	-13.34%	25,230
Davie	2,406	37.50%	4,010	62.50%	-1,604	-25.00%	6,416
Duplin	6,392	75.14%	2,115	24.86%	4,277	50.28%	8,507
Durham	18,897	62.58%	11,301	37.42%	7,596	25.16%	30,198
Edgecombe	8,504	81.53%	1,927	18.47%	6,577	63.06%	10,431
Forsyth	24,535	48.14%	26,436	51.86%	-1,901	-3.72%	50,971
Franklin	5,376	87.90%	740	12.10%	4,636	75.80%	6,116
Gaston	17,781	48.14%	19,157	51.86%	-1,376	-3.72%	36,938
Gates	1,247	77.41%	364	22.59%	883	54.82%	1,611
Graham	1,590	53.54%	1,380	46.46%	210	7.08%	2,970
Granville	4,583	79.72%	1,166	20.28%	3,417	59.44%	5,749
Greene	2,976	94.12%	186	5.88%	2,790	88.24%	3,162
Guilford	29,028	46.57%	33,310	53.43%	-4,282	-6.86%	62,338
Halifax	8,807	79.94%	2,210	20.06%	6,597	59.88%	11,017
Harnett	7,595	63.82%	4,306	36.18%	3,289	27.64%	11,901
Haywood	8,761	58.86%	6,124	41.14%	2,637	17.72%	14,885
Henderson	3,803	30.25%	8,768	69.75%	-4,965	-39.50%	12,571
Hertford	2,859	83.16%	579	16.84%	2,280	66.32%	3,438
Hoke	1,761	74.08%	616	25.92%	1,145	48.16%	2,377
Hyde	919	69.36%	406	30.64%	513	38.72%	1,325
Iredell	8,580	42.09%	11,804	57.91%	-3,224	-15.82%	20,384
Jackson	4,296	53.86%	3,680	46.14%	616	7.72%	7,976
Johnston	9,997	64.81%	5,429	35.19%	4,568	29.62%	15,426
Jones	1,673	83.48%	331	16.52%	1,342	66.96%	2,004
Lee	4,688	69.01%	2,105	30.99%	2,583	38.02%	6,793
Lenoir	6,723	75.07%	2,233	24.93%	4,490	50.14%	8,956
Lincoln	5,389	46.39%	6,228	53.61%	-839	-7.22%	11,617
Macon	3,396	50.51%	3,327	49.49%	69	1.02%	6,723
Madison	3,666	43.55%	4,751	56.45%	-1,085	-12.90%	8,417
Martin	5,493	92.98%	415	7.02%	5,078	85.96%	5,908
McDowell	4,755	50.24%	4,710	49.76%	45	0.48%	9,465
Mecklenburg	33,044	42.70%	44,334	57.30%	-11,290	-14.60%	77,378
Mitchell	1,236	23.57%	4,009	76.43%	-2,773	-52.86%	5,245
Montgomery	3,176	49.96%	3,181	50.04%	-5	-0.08%	6,357
Moore	5,066	48.21%	5,442	51.79%	-376	-3.58%	10,508
Nash	10,424	79.82%	2,636	20.18%	7,788	59.64%	13,060
New Hanover	10,330	52.54%	9,330	47.46%	1,000	5.08%	19,660
Northampton	4,334	88.14%	583	11.86%	3,751	76.28%	4,917
Onslow	4,275	77.22%	1,261	22.78%	3,014	54.44%	5,536
Orange	5,156	57.49%	3,813	42.51%	1,343	14.98%	8,969
Pamlico	1,428	61.26%	903	38.74%	525	22.52%	2,331
Pasquotank	3,579	63.01%	2,101	36.99%	1,478	26.02%	5,680
Pender	2,029	63.78%	1,152	36.22%	877	27.56%	3,181
Perquimans	1,245	65.91%	644	34.09%	601	31.82%	1,889
Person	4,266	75.64%	1,374	24.36%	2,892	51.28%	5,640
Pitt	11,271	83.65%	2,203	16.35%	9,068	67.30%	13,474
Polk	2,741	51.70%	2,561	48.30%	180	3.40%	5,302
Randolph	8,975	41.93%	12,429	58.07%	-3,454	-16.14%	21,404
Richmond	7,340	68.59%	3,361	31.41%	3,979	37.18%	10,701
Robeson	9,311	69.29%	4,127	30.71%	5,184	38.58%	13,438
Rockingham	12,423	64.34%	6,885	35.66%	5,538	28.68%	19,308
Rowan	11,296	39.18%	17,535	60.82%	-6,239	-21.64%	28,831
Rutherford	7,755	48.04%	8,387	51.96%	-632	-3.92%	16,142
Sampson	6,956	51.89%	6,449	48.11%	507	3.78%	13,405
Scotland	2,912	64.68%	1,590	35.32%	1,322	29.36%	4,502
Stanly	7,202	41.64%	10,093	58.36%	-2,891	-16.72%	17,295
Stokes	4,504	54.29%	3,792	45.71%	712	8.58%	8,296
Surry	8,206	51.95%	7,591	48.05%	615	3.90%	15,797
Swain	1,949	53.71%	1,680	46.29%	269	7.42%	3,629
Transylvania	3,641	47.36%	4,047	52.64%	-406	-5.28%	7,688
Tyrrell	916	70.41%	385	29.59%	531	40.82%	1,301
Union	7,416	66.18%	3,790	33.82%	3,626	32.36%	11,206
Vance	5,697	76.80%	1,721	23.20%	3,976	53.60%	7,418
Wake	23,393	60.84%	15,057	39.16%	8,336	21.68%	38,450
Warren	2,960	81.68%	664	18.32%	2,296	63.36%	3,624
Washington	1,974	71.83%	774	28.17%	1,200	43.66%	2,748
Watauga	3,600	44.30%	4,527	55.70%	-927	-11.40%	8,127
Wayne	7,281	60.96%	4,662	39.04%	2,619	21.92%	11,943
Wilkes	7,143	38.43%	11,446	61.57%	-4,303	-23.14%	18,589
Wilson	8,684	77.17%	2,569	22.83%	6,115	54.34%	11,253
Yadkin	2,786	33.46%	5,540	66.54%	-2,754	-33.08%	8,326
Yancey	3,693	55.57%	2,953	44.43%	740	11.14%	6,646
Totals	652,803	53.91%	558,107	46.09%	94,696	7.82%	1,210,910

==== Counties that flipped from Democratic to Republican ====
- Ashe
- Buncombe
- Brunswick
- Caldwell
- Clay
- Cabarrus
- Forsyth
- Guilford
- Gaston
- Iredell
- Mecklenburg
- Montgomery
- Moore
- Rowan
- Rutherford
- Transylvania

== See also ==
- United States presidential elections in North Carolina
