= Burleigh (Concord, North Carolina) =

Historic house in North Carolina, United States

- U.S. National Register of Historic Places
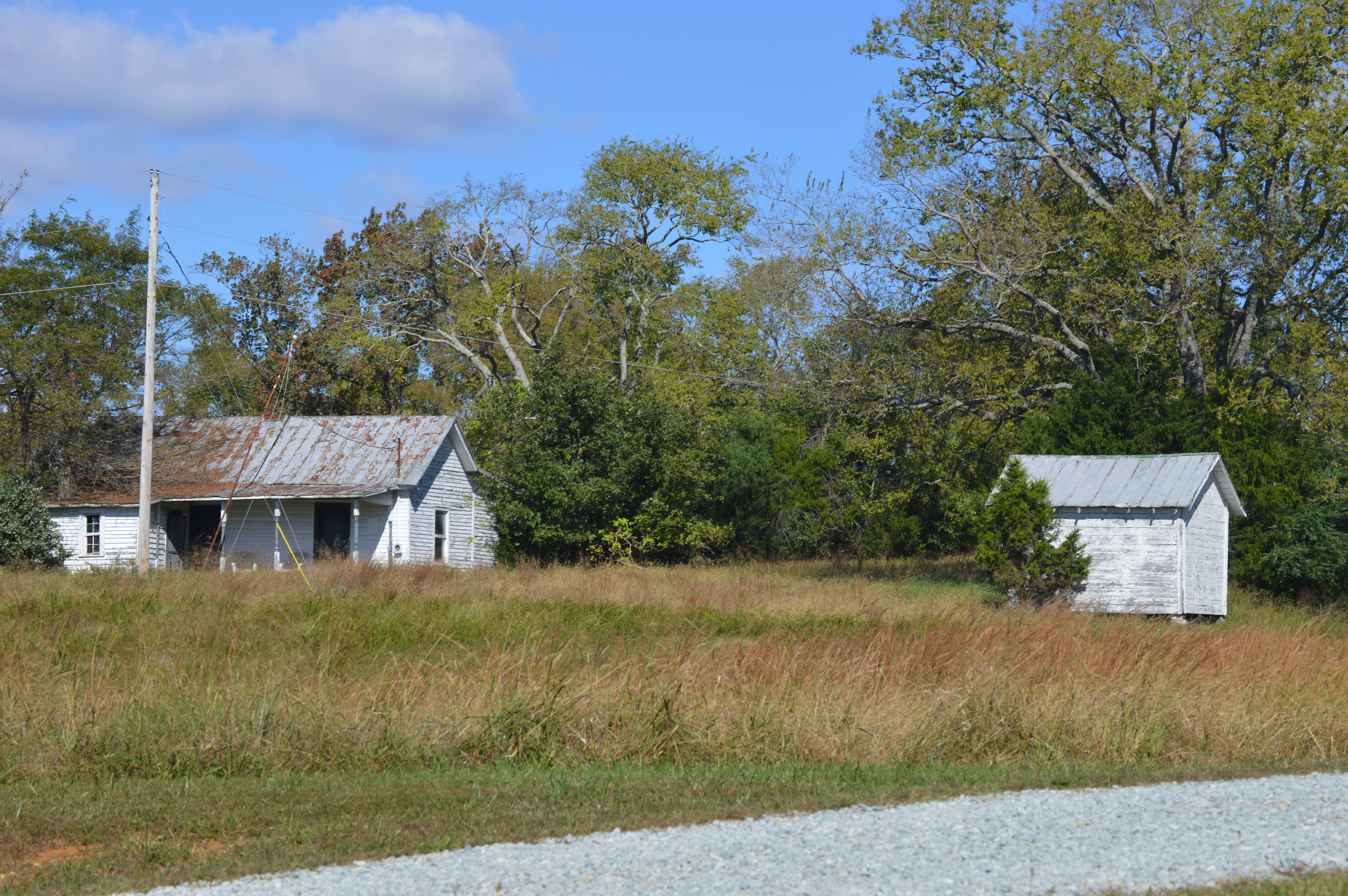
- Outbuildings south of the main house

- Location within North Carolina Location within the United States
- Location: NW of Concord on NC 57, near Concord, North Carolina
- Coordinates: 36°29′08″N 79°07′10″W
- Area: 133 acres (54 ha)
- Built: c. 1800-1820
- Architectural style: Greek Revival, Georgian, Federal
- NRHP reference No.: 80002893
- Added to NRHP: May 1, 1980

Burleigh, also known as the McGehee-Phifer Plantation, is a historic plantation house located near Concord, Person County, North Carolina. It was built between about 1800 and 1820, and is a 2 1/2-story, vernacular Late Georgian central hall plan symmetrical frame dwelling. The front and facades feature Greek Revival style, one-story, temple front porticoes with Doric order columns. The interior has Late Federal and Greek Revival style design elements.

The house was added to the National Register of Historic Places in 1980.
