= Holloway-Walker Dollarhite House =

Historic house in North Carolina, United States

- U.S. National Register of Historic Places
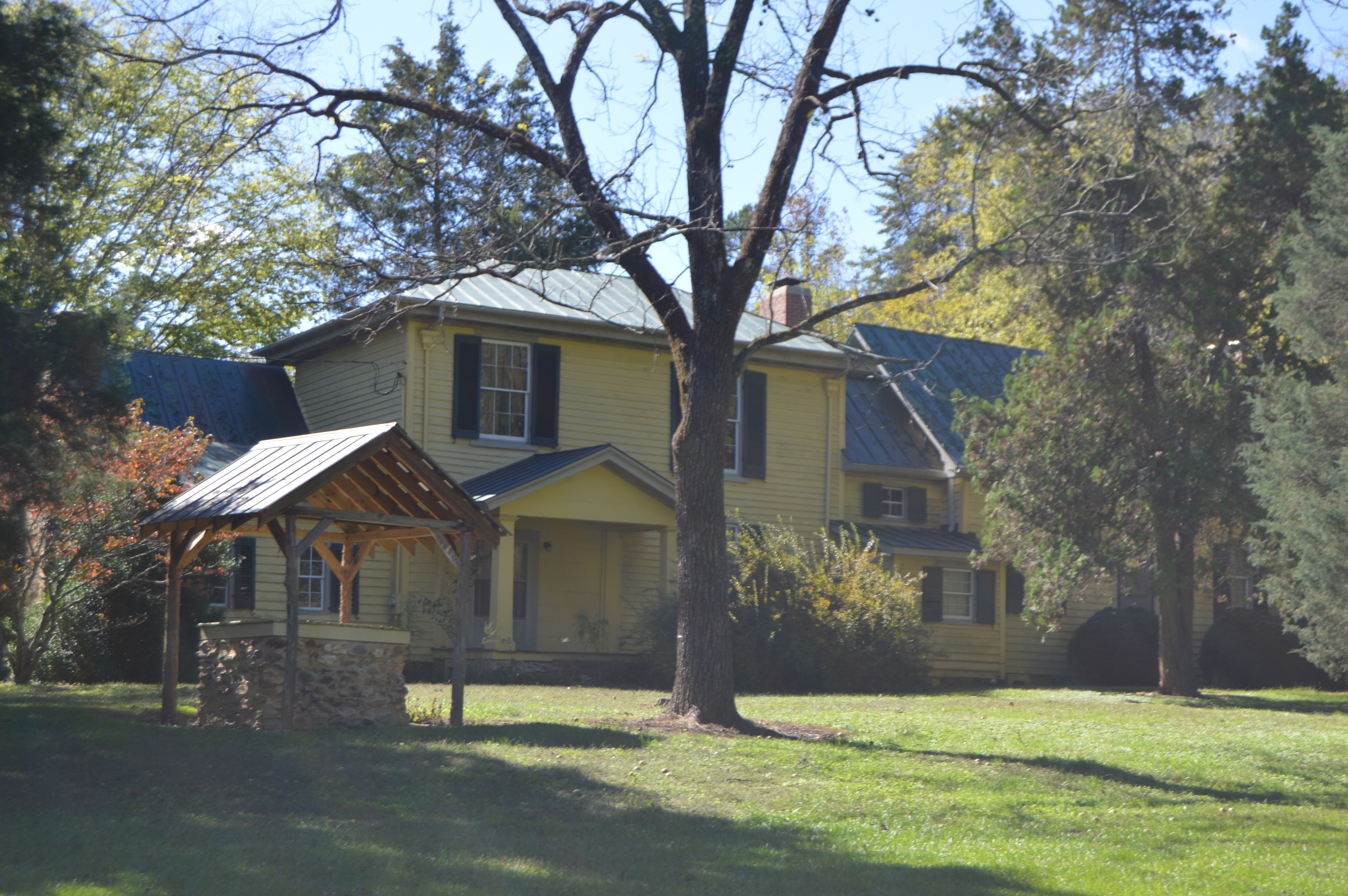
- Front of the house

- Location within North Carolina Location within the United States
- Location: SR 1514, near Bethel Hill, North Carolina
- Coordinates: 36°29′08″N 78°54′27″W
- Area: 11 acres (4.5 ha)
- Architectural style: Greek Revival, Georgian
- NRHP reference No.: 82003496
- Added to NRHP: June 1, 1982

Holloway-Walker-Dollarhite House is a historic home located near Bethel Hill, Person County, North Carolina. It consists of a 1 1/2-story block with a shed addition and Georgian details dated to the late-18th century; a two-story, mid-19th century central block with Greek Revival style trim; and a 1 1/2-story, early-19th century section moved to the property in 1976. The early-19th century section is connected to the main block by a modern addition.

The house was added to the National Register of Historic Places in 1982.
