= Two Dogs Site =

The Two Dogs Site (31PR92) is a lithic quarry site located in Person County, North Carolina. This precontact archaeological site dates to the Middle Archaic and Woodland Periods, and it is classified as a lithic quarry site due to the presence of thousands of lithic artifacts found there. Located in the Carolina Slate Belt, the stone materials present at Two Dogs provided precontact Indigenous peoples with openly accessible lithic resources, predominantly for toolmaking, as they passed through the site between other, more residential areas.

Two Dogs was excavated from 2004 to 2005 following shovel testing at the beginning of the decade. The lithic materials found at the Two Dogs Site were subjected to petrographic analysis, and isotopes were geochemically tested to confirm the origins of the stone artifacts. The Two Dogs site has been determined to be neither residential or agricultural; rather, this site was exclusively an area where people from nearby sedentary civilizations could access their necessary lithic resources.

== Excavation history ==
The Two Dogs Site was first identified when Environmental Services, Inc. conducted shovel tests over an area of almost 70,000 square meters, which was found to contain large amounts of lithic materials. Field Excavations were conducted at Two Dogs during the winter from 2004 to 2005, and the researchers developed a strategy to sample the site in order to manage the high volume of lithic materials to be excavated, catalogued, and analyzed. Following well-established archaeological field procedures, the site was split into five areas, denoted as areas A-E, and a random stratified survey was conducted at the site with a total of 225 test units initially sampled. No unit was tested within five meters of another unit or shovel test, which allowed the field archaeologists to avoid sampling the areas unevenly. Once these units were given GPS coordinates and mapped, the data from the 225 sampled units was combined with data from the previous 149 shovel tests conducted in 2001; this allowed for the identification of specific places within the Two Dogs Site where further excavation would provide the most useful results. Thirteen one meter by one meter units to be excavated more thoroughly were placed across the Two Dogs Site based on artifact density and patterns of different lithic material findings, and this excavation project yielded thousands of lithic artifacts and no distinct architectural features or indicators of war.

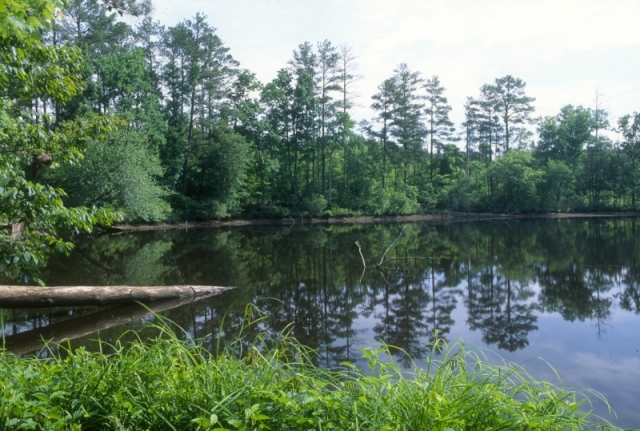
This is a view of the nearby Uwharrie National Forest today. Middle Archaic and Woodland Period Uwharrie groups have been connected to the Two Dogs Site using isotopic analysis of lithic artifacts.

== Analyzing the artifacts ==
Artifact density was assessed using GIS and statistical correlations, and it was determined that the stratification of larger artifacts remaining on the surface while smaller artifacts had been pushed below could be attributed to trees falling and disrupting the geomorphology of the site. Lithic samples of on and off-site materials from the excavation were also used for geochemical and petrological analysis, conducted independently. Excavation of the Two Dogs Site yielded 32,904 artifacts in total, which were found to mostly be dacite with some quartz and other materials appearing at significantly lower frequencies. Petrographic analysis indicated that all samples of local lithic materials were felsic volcanic rocks, and the samples of off-site lithics were found to be felsic volcanic siltstones. These lithic materials were shown experimentally to be very strong, and experts determined that the material holds a very sharp edge when shaped, so the lithic resources at the Two Dogs Site would have been very useful for manufacturing stone tools. Because of research interests in geomorphological analysis, five trenches in addition to the excavation units were dug using backhoes, and this additional site processing provided six lithic samples for such analysis. Geochemical analysis using isotopic markers confirmed that the lithic samples from Two Dogs belonged to the nearby Virgilina and Uwharrie natural regions.

== Site significance ==
Based on the results of excavation and analysis of artifacts, the Two Dogs Site has been interpreted as a lithic quarry site used primarily by ancient Indigenous peoples to manufacture or replace their tools while traveling between nearby residential sites. Civilizations in the Middle Archaic (6000–3000 BCE) and Woodland Periods (1000 BCE–1000 CE) are known to have been increasingly sedentary, so the majority of groups in the region lived in permanent, year-round dwellings and stayed within a consistent area for most of their subsistence. Thus, for the nearby civilizations, the Two Dogs Site was an area that provided sedentary populations with a secure and convenient supply of lithic resources, for the grounds did not require people to dig large pits to obtain stones; instead, Two Dogs offered lithic materials on the surface level of the ground, allowing for efficient production of strong stone tools.

Two Dogs is a significant archaeological site because, thus far, no evidence of being used for residential or agricultural purposes in this time period has been found there, and there is a distinct lack of weapon tips found at the site, suggesting that the Two Dogs Site's lithic resources were not fought over for one specific group to take control. The plentiful analytical findings at this site also give an impetus for future archaeologists to conduct detailed petrographic and geochemical analysis at other known quarry sites across the region, especially following mobility patterns of prehistoric civilizations, since the lithic materials from the Two Dogs Site have been analyzed more thoroughly than artifacts from other comparable sites in the region.
