= 1980 United States presidential election in North Carolina =

- November 4, 1980
- Turnout: 66.88% ▲1.18 pp

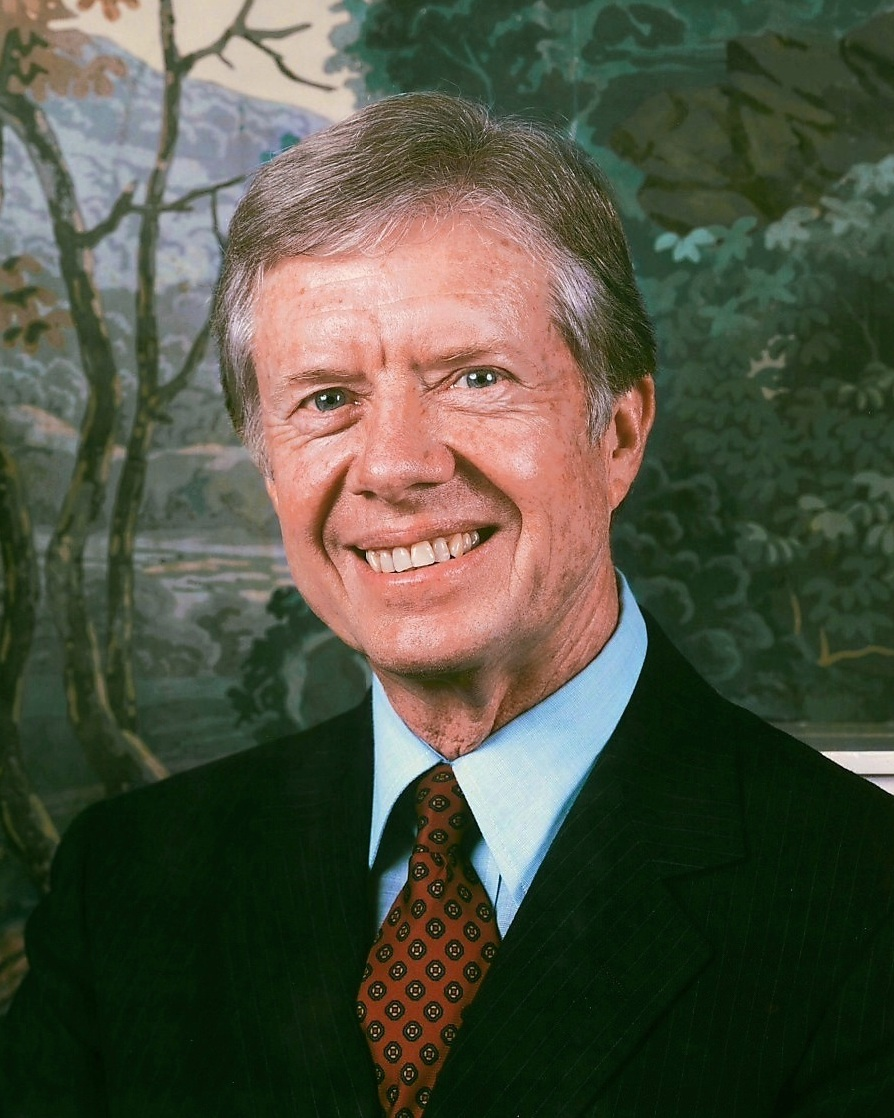
Nominee	Ronald Reagan	Jimmy Carter
Party	Republican	Democratic
Home state	California	Georgia
Running mate	George H. W. Bush	Walter Mondale
Electoral vote	13	0
Popular vote	915,018	875,635
Percentage	49.30%	47.18%

Reagan
40–50%
50–60%
60–70%
Carter
40–50%
50–60%
60–70%
70–80%
President before election
Jimmy Carter
Democratic
Elected President
Ronald Reagan
Republican

The 1980 United States presidential election in North Carolina took place on November 4, 1980, as part of the 1980 United States presidential election. Voters chose 13 representatives, or electors to the Electoral College, who voted for president and vice president.

North Carolina barely voted for the Republican nominee, Governor Ronald Reagan, over the Democratic nominee, President Jimmy Carter in a close battle. Independent John B. Anderson, won 2% of the vote from Reagan and Carter in the state. The final numbers were 49.30% for Reagan to 47.18% for Carter and 2.85% for Anderson.

As of the 2024 presidential election, this is the last election in which the following counties have voted for a Democratic presidential candidate: Cleveland, Currituck, Harnett, Lee, Person and Union.

Among white voters, 57% supported Reagan while 39% supported Carter.

== Campaign ==
=== Predictions ===
Source	Rating	As of
The Times and Democrat	Tossup	September 23, 1980
Bristol Herald Courier	Likely D	October 5, 1980
Boca Raton News	Likely D	October 12, 1980
Kansas City Star	Likely D	October 12, 1980
Fort Worth Star-Telegram	Lean D	October 31, 1980
The State	Safe D	November 2, 1980
Daily Press	Likely D	November 3, 1980

== Results ==
1980 United States presidential election in North Carolina
Party	Candidate	Votes	Percentage	Electoral votes
Republican	Ronald Reagan	915,018	49.30%	13
Democratic	Jimmy Carter (incumbent)	875,635	47.18%	0
Independent	John B. Anderson	52,800	2.85%	0
Libertarian	Edward Clark	9,677	0.52%	0
Citizens	Barry Commoner	2,287	0.12%	0
Socialist Workers	Clifton DeBerry	416	0.02%	0
Totals		1,855,833	100.0%	13
Voter turnout (Voting age/Registered voters)		54.52%/67.0%		—

=== Results by county ===
County	Ronald Reagan Republican		Jimmy Carter Democratic		John B. Anderson Independent		Ed Clark Libertarian		Various candidates Other parties		Margin		Total
County	#	%	#	%	#	%	#	%	#	%	#	%	Total
Alamance	18,077	53.06%	15,042	44.16%	760	2.23%	164	0.48%	23	0.07%	3,035	8.90%	34,066
Alexander	6,376	57.39%	4,546	40.92%	137	1.23%	44	0.40%	6	0.05%	1,830	16.47%	11,109
Alleghany	1,995	46.29%	2,198	51.00%	91	2.11%	24	0.56%	2	0.05%	-203	-4.71%	4,310
Anson	1,968	27.77%	4,973	70.17%	111	1.57%	23	0.32%	12	0.17%	-3,005	-42.40%	7,087
Ashe	5,643	54.72%	4,461	43.26%	154	1.49%	47	0.46%	7	0.07%	1,182	11.46%	10,312
Avery	3,480	67.16%	1,527	29.47%	147	2.84%	22	0.42%	6	0.12%	1,953	37.68%	5,183
Beaufort	6,773	51.95%	6,024	46.21%	186	1.43%	49	0.38%	5	0.04%	749	5.74%	13,037
Bertie	1,695	30.10%	3,863	68.59%	45	0.80%	16	0.28%	13	0.23%	-2,168	-38.49%	5,632
Bladen	2,745	30.70%	6,104	68.27%	64	0.72%	26	0.29%	2	0.02%	-3,359	-37.57%	8,941
Brunswick	5,897	45.35%	6,761	52.00%	265	2.04%	71	0.55%	9	0.07%	-864	-6.65%	13,003
Buncombe	26,124	48.80%	24,837	46.40%	2,153	4.02%	299	0.56%	117	0.22%	1,287	2.40%	53,530
Burke	12,956	50.97%	11,680	45.95%	558	2.20%	169	0.66%	54	0.21%	1,276	5.02%	25,417
Cabarrus	15,143	59.19%	9,768	38.18%	562	2.20%	96	0.38%	16	0.06%	5,375	21.01%	25,585
Caldwell	12,965	58.11%	8,738	39.17%	440	1.97%	135	0.61%	32	0.14%	4,227	18.94%	22,310
Camden	813	38.94%	1,212	58.05%	45	2.16%	12	0.57%	6	0.29%	-399	-19.11%	2,088
Carteret	7,733	52.37%	6,485	43.92%	460	3.12%	73	0.49%	16	0.11%	1,248	8.45%	14,767
Caswell	2,156	37.32%	3,529	61.09%	66	1.14%	21	0.36%	5	0.09%	-1,373	-23.77%	5,777
Catawba	22,873	60.39%	13,873	36.63%	866	2.29%	242	0.64%	24	0.06%	9,000	23.76%	37,878
Chatham	5,414	41.00%	7,144	54.10%	481	3.64%	99	0.75%	67	0.51%	-1,730	-13.10%	13,205
Cherokee	3,849	54.37%	3,114	43.99%	80	1.13%	33	0.47%	3	0.04%	735	10.38%	7,079
Chowan	1,424	38.91%	2,146	58.63%	71	1.94%	16	0.44%	3	0.08%	-722	-19.72%	3,660
Clay	2,136	60.22%	1,324	37.33%	53	1.49%	28	0.79%	6	0.17%	812	22.89%	3,547
Cleveland	10,828	46.08%	12,219	52.00%	333	1.42%	111	0.47%	7	0.03%	-1,391	-5.92%	23,498
Columbus	5,522	34.64%	10,212	64.07%	148	0.93%	55	0.35%	3	0.02%	-4,690	-29.43%	15,940
Craven	8,554	50.97%	7,781	46.36%	356	2.12%	81	0.48%	11	0.07%	773	4.61%	16,783
Cumberland	21,540	47.63%	22,073	48.80%	1,261	2.79%	293	0.65%	61	0.13%	-533	-1.17%	45,228
Currituck	1,668	44.06%	1,980	52.30%	97	2.56%	37	0.98%	4	0.11%	-312	-8.24%	3,786
Dare	2,794	49.76%	2,497	44.47%	260	4.63%	50	0.89%	14	0.25%	297	5.29%	5,615
Davidson	22,794	59.56%	14,579	38.10%	679	1.77%	202	0.53%	15	0.04%	8,215	21.46%	38,269
Davie	6,302	63.79%	3,289	33.29%	223	2.26%	63	0.64%	3	0.03%	3,013	30.50%	9,880
Duplin	5,403	41.34%	7,524	57.57%	109	0.83%	32	0.24%	1	0.01%	-2,121	-16.23%	13,069
Durham	19,276	40.24%	24,969	52.13%	3,052	6.37%	274	0.57%	330	0.69%	-5,693	-11.89%	47,901
Edgecombe	5,916	42.09%	7,945	56.52%	148	1.05%	36	0.26%	11	0.08%	-2,029	-14.43%	14,056
Forsyth	42,389	49.99%	38,870	45.84%	2,897	3.42%	527	0.62%	115	0.13%	3,519	4.15%	84,798
Franklin	3,508	38.63%	5,427	59.76%	104	1.15%	38	0.42%	4	0.04%	-1,919	-21.13%	9,081
Gaston	25,139	55.61%	19,016	42.07%	823	1.82%	201	0.44%	25	0.06%	6,123	13.54%	45,204
Gates	957	27.60%	2,435	70.23%	61	1.76%	11	0.32%	3	0.09%	-1,478	-42.63%	3,467
Graham	1,961	54.25%	1,608	44.48%	36	1.00%	6	0.17%	4	0.11%	353	9.77%	3,615
Granville	3,513	37.99%	5,556	60.09%	133	1.44%	29	0.31%	15	0.16%	-2,043	-22.10%	9,246
Greene	2,221	43.44%	2,835	55.45%	34	0.66%	20	0.39%	3	0.06%	-614	-12.01%	5,113
Guilford	53,291	51.93%	44,516	43.38%	4,019	3.92%	636	0.62%	160	0.16%	8,775	8.55%	102,622
Halifax	6,033	41.19%	8,364	57.10%	180	1.23%	56	0.38%	15	0.10%	-2,331	-15.91%	14,648
Harnett	7,284	44.70%	8,791	53.95%	165	1.01%	42	0.26%	13	0.08%	-1,507	-9.25%	16,295
Haywood	7,217	41.33%	9,814	56.20%	349	2.00%	66	0.38%	16	0.09%	-2,597	-14.87%	17,462
Henderson	13,573	61.19%	7,578	34.16%	901	4.06%	97	0.44%	32	0.15%	5,995	27.03%	22,181
Hertford	1,854	30.59%	4,102	67.69%	80	1.32%	20	0.33%	4	0.07%	-2,248	-37.10%	6,060
Hoke	1,168	25.24%	3,376	72.95%	56	1.21%	21	0.45%	7	0.15%	-2,208	-47.41%	4,628
Hyde	807	38.95%	1,221	58.93%	37	1.79%	5	0.24%	2	0.10%	-414	-19.98%	2,072
Iredell	14,926	53.70%	12,067	43.42%	624	2.25%	158	0.57%	19	0.07%	2,859	10.28%	27,794
Jackson	4,140	44.47%	4,857	52.17%	246	2.64%	50	0.54%	17	0.18%	-717	-7.70%	9,310
Johnston	10,444	51.26%	9,601	47.12%	271	1.33%	54	0.27%	6	0.03%	843	4.14%	20,376
Jones	1,401	38.60%	2,198	60.55%	18	0.50%	11	0.30%	2	0.06%	-797	-21.95%	3,630
Lee	4,847	45.84%	5,426	51.31%	251	2.37%	40	0.38%	10	0.09%	-579	-5.47%	10,574
Lenoir	9,832	55.50%	7,546	42.60%	263	1.48%	57	0.32%	16	0.09%	2,286	12.90%	17,714
Lincoln	9,009	52.39%	7,796	45.34%	299	1.74%	85	0.49%	7	0.04%	1,213	7.05%	17,196
Macon	4,727	52.34%	4,105	45.45%	153	1.69%	39	0.43%	7	0.08%	622	6.89%	9,031
Madison	2,629	44.02%	3,202	53.62%	108	1.81%	21	0.35%	12	0.20%	-573	-9.60%	5,972
Martin	2,564	34.59%	4,750	64.09%	81	1.09%	16	0.22%	1	0.01%	-2,186	-29.50%	7,412
McDowell	5,680	53.55%	4,703	44.34%	175	1.65%	44	0.41%	4	0.04%	977	9.21%	10,606
Mecklenburg	68,384	47.80%	66,995	46.83%	6,560	4.59%	956	0.67%	163	0.11%	1,389	0.97%	143,058
Mitchell	4,322	68.93%	1,765	28.15%	146	2.33%	32	0.51%	5	0.08%	2,557	40.78%	6,270
Montgomery	3,587	45.74%	4,129	52.65%	99	1.26%	25	0.32%	2	0.03%	-542	-6.91%	7,842
Moore	10,158	53.71%	8,084	42.75%	563	2.98%	91	0.48%	15	0.08%	2,074	10.96%	18,911
Nash	11,043	56.34%	8,184	41.75%	293	1.49%	74	0.38%	7	0.04%	2,859	14.59%	19,601
New Hanover	17,243	53.48%	13,670	42.40%	1,114	3.45%	182	0.56%	35	0.11%	3,573	11.08%	32,244
Northampton	1,847	26.92%	4,933	71.90%	62	0.90%	16	0.23%	3	0.04%	-3,086	-44.98%	6,861
Onslow	8,861	52.95%	7,371	44.04%	400	2.39%	90	0.54%	14	0.08%	1,490	8.91%	16,736
Orange	9,261	32.39%	15,226	53.26%	3,364	11.77%	300	1.05%	438	1.53%	-5,965	-20.87%	28,589
Pamlico	1,504	39.55%	2,224	58.48%	48	1.26%	20	0.53%	7	0.18%	-720	-18.93%	3,803
Pasquotank	3,340	43.39%	4,128	53.62%	179	2.33%	37	0.48%	14	0.18%	-788	-10.23%	7,698
Pender	3,018	40.05%	4,382	58.15%	103	1.37%	26	0.35%	7	0.09%	-1,364	-18.10%	7,536
Perquimans	1,210	42.40%	1,560	54.66%	63	2.21%	17	0.60%	4	0.14%	-350	-12.26%	2,854
Person	3,281	43.55%	4,111	54.57%	104	1.38%	34	0.45%	4	0.05%	-830	-11.02%	7,534
Pitt	12,816	48.60%	12,590	47.74%	827	3.14%	101	0.38%	37	0.14%	226	0.86%	26,371
Polk	3,021	53.86%	2,375	42.34%	160	2.85%	49	0.87%	4	0.07%	646	11.52%	5,609
Randolph	19,881	64.72%	10,107	32.90%	563	1.83%	145	0.47%	21	0.07%	9,774	31.82%	30,717
Richmond	3,911	33.69%	7,416	63.88%	224	1.93%	49	0.42%	9	0.08%	-3,505	-30.19%	11,609
Robeson	6,982	27.89%	17,618	70.39%	331	1.32%	72	0.29%	27	0.11%	-10,636	-42.50%	25,030
Rockingham	11,205	47.64%	11,708	49.77%	463	1.97%	130	0.55%	16	0.07%	-503	-2.13%	23,522
Rowan	18,566	59.68%	11,671	37.52%	707	2.27%	155	0.50%	10	0.03%	6,895	22.16%	31,109
Rutherford	8,363	49.29%	8,315	49.01%	203	1.20%	78	0.46%	7	0.04%	48	0.28%	16,966
Sampson	8,097	46.06%	9,090	51.71%	308	1.75%	58	0.33%	25	0.14%	-993	-5.65%	17,578
Scotland	2,133	31.45%	4,446	65.56%	155	2.29%	41	0.60%	7	0.10%	-2,313	-34.11%	6,782
Stanly	9,734	54.54%	7,784	43.62%	248	1.39%	69	0.39%	11	0.06%	1,950	10.92%	17,846
Stokes	7,275	54.93%	5,764	43.52%	151	1.14%	50	0.38%	5	0.04%	1,511	11.41%	13,245
Surry	10,065	51.86%	8,987	46.31%	256	1.32%	92	0.47%	8	0.04%	1,078	5.55%	19,408
Swain	1,457	41.39%	1,987	56.45%	70	1.99%	5	0.14%	1	0.03%	-530	-15.06%	3,520
Transylvania	4,826	52.60%	4,008	43.68%	274	2.99%	58	0.63%	9	0.10%	818	8.92%	9,175
Tyrrell	466	34.01%	887	64.74%	14	1.02%	3	0.22%	0	0.00%	-421	-30.73%	1,370
Union	9,012	45.77%	10,073	51.16%	487	2.47%	102	0.52%	14	0.07%	-1,061	-5.39%	19,688
Vance	4,217	43.15%	5,415	55.40%	101	1.03%	35	0.36%	6	0.06%	-1,198	-12.25%	9,774
Wake	49,768	47.31%	49,003	46.58%	5,455	5.19%	741	0.70%	226	0.22%	765	0.73%	105,193
Warren	1,582	29.13%	3,750	69.06%	74	1.36%	15	0.28%	9	0.17%	-2,168	-39.93%	5,430
Washington	1,943	38.57%	3,008	59.72%	68	1.35%	15	0.30%	3	0.06%	-1,065	-21.15%	5,037
Watauga	6,149	51.42%	5,022	42.00%	645	5.39%	105	0.88%	37	0.31%	1,127	9.42%	11,958
Wayne	12,860	56.31%	9,586	41.98%	322	1.41%	62	0.27%	6	0.03%	3,274	14.33%	22,836
Wilkes	14,462	62.74%	8,184	35.51%	282	1.22%	102	0.44%	19	0.08%	6,278	27.23%	23,049
Wilson	8,329	49.86%	8,042	48.14%	243	1.45%	71	0.43%	19	0.11%	287	1.72%	16,704
Yadkin	7,530	65.08%	3,850	33.28%	136	1.18%	50	0.43%	4	0.03%	3,680	31.80%	11,570
Yancey	3,363	44.57%	4,010	53.14%	110	1.46%	31	0.41%	32	0.42%	-647	-8.57%	7,546
Totals	915,018	49.30%	875,635	47.18%	52,800	2.85%	9,677	0.52%	2,703	0.15%	39,383	2.12%	1,855,833

==== Counties that flipped from Democratic to Republican ====
- Alamance
- Alexander
- Ashe
- Beaufort
- Buncombe
- Burke
- Caldwell
- Carteret
- Cherokee
- Clay
- Craven
- Dare
- Forsyth
- Gaston
- Graham
- Guilford
- Iredell
- Johnston
- Lincoln
- Macon
- McDowell
- Mecklenburg
- Nash
- New Hanover
- Onslow
- Pitt
- Polk
- Rowan
- Rutherford
- Stanly
- Stokes
- Surry
- Transylvania
- Wilson

== Works cited ==
- Black, Earl; Black, Merle (1992). The Vital South: How Presidents Are Elected. Harvard University Press. ISBN 0674941306.
