= Mount Tirzah, North Carolina =

Mount Tirzah
- Unincorporated community
- Location within the state of North Carolina
- Coordinates: 36°16′49″N 78°54′25″W
- Country: United States
- State: North Carolina
- County: Person
- Elevation: 673 ft (205 m)
- Time zone: UTC-5 (Eastern (EST))
  - Summer (DST): UTC-4 (EDT)
- ZIP Codes: 27583
- Area code: 336
- GNIS feature ID: 1021561

Mount Tirzah is an unincorporated community in Person County, North Carolina, United States.

== History ==
The location was named Mount Tirzah by Colonel Stephen Moore, a participant in the American Revolutionary War, in 1783. A United States Post Office operated in the community from 1795 until 1906.Stephen Moore was born 30 Oct 1734 in New York City. He was the 17th of 18 children of John Moore [1686 SC – 1749 New York City] and Frances Lambert [1692 – 1782]. His father was "Col. John Moore, a leading merchant in the early days of New York City".

The Moore family history is best preserved by the memoirs of John Moore, Esq. (1745–1828), from which we learn that Stephen was "brought up in business by John Watts". There is no indication as to Stephen's age at the time of this apprenticeship, but it would be typical of the times to have begun his training at about age 14. John Watts was a prominent merchant and a provision contractor to the British army during the French and Indian War.

Little is known about Stephen Moore’s formal education, although his remarkable penmanship attests to a thorough and careful education. The account books, ledgers, daybooks, and letters he produced demonstrate his skill as a writer and record keeper. Recent research indicates that he spent his late teens and early twenties working as a scribe or clerk. His distinctive and highly legible handwriting appears throughout most of New York Deed Book 14, all of Deed Book 15, and the opening portion of Deed Book 16.

At the age of 23, he was commissioned a Lieutenant in 1757 in the New York Provincial troops and participated in the French and Indian War, serving as Deputy Paymaster. His first child, Robert Charles Moore, the only child of Stephen Moore and "Julia", who was an actress, was born 5th Nov 1762. John Moore, Esq [1745-1828] tells of his uncle Stephen Moore in mid-winter 1762/3 delivering dispatches from General Haldimand in Quebec to Sir Jeffrey Amherst in New York City, in TEN days. With two Mohawk guides he went overland on snowshoes, then canoed down Lake Champlain & George, ice-skated down the Hudson as far as Yonkers, then walked the last 20 miles to New York City. All the principals are in the right places at the right time. Stephen often traveled this route afterward and the timing would have afforded him the opportunity of visiting his family, having been away as a participant of several years in the French and Indian War. At the conclusion of hostilities, Stephen was in Quebec, Canada, where he settled for about ten years and trading, shipping and doing mercantile business. Stephen Moore was married 25 Dec. 1768 in Quebec, Canada, by Rev. Mr. Montgomery, Chaplin of the King's 10th Regiment, to Grizey Phillips [of Boston, Mass].

[his business partner, Hugh Finlay, married Grizey's sister, Mary Phillips.]

Grizey Phillips was born 18 Feb 1749 in Boston, MA daughter of Capt John Phillips (1710–1773) and wife Anne Engs (1715 -1775)

Leaving Quebec in late 1770, Stephen settled his family at West Point, NY at the estate he inherited at the death of his father. Now– the move to NC may have been a result of the "rumor of war" and the strategic location of his home. By Sept 1776, his family was already established in Orange County and by 1777 he was acquiring land and building his estate, Mt. Tirzah in Caswell [later Person] county. From info provided by Terri Bradshaw O’Neill

In 1779, he was given charge of a Regiment of NC State Troops. He was in the 1st Battle of Camden [SC]. ” Moore, Stephen [NC] Lieutenant-Col. NC Militia – taken prisoner at Charleston, 12th May 1780".

in 1781, Robert Moore served a 3-month term as an express rider in a Militia unit at Post Mt. Tirzah.

"The elder Stephen Moore was the owner of West Point and sold it to the US Government in 1790".

Stephen Moore died at Mt Tirzah, Person County, NC 29 Dec 1799. Moore Family Bible #1900-Webb Papers, Southern Historical Col, UNC-Chapel Hill
