= Ai, North Carolina =

Ai
- Unincorporated community
- Location within the state of North Carolina Ai (the United States)
- Coordinates: 36°19′13″N 78°57′42″W
- Country: United States
- State: North Carolina
- County: Person
- Elevation: 610 ft (190 m)
- Time zone: UTC-5 (Eastern (EST))
  - Summer (DST): UTC-4 (EDT)
- GNIS ID: 1966761

Ai (pronounced EYE) is an unincorporated community in Person County, North Carolina, United States. Ai is home to Antioch Baptist Church.
