= Mayo Lake =

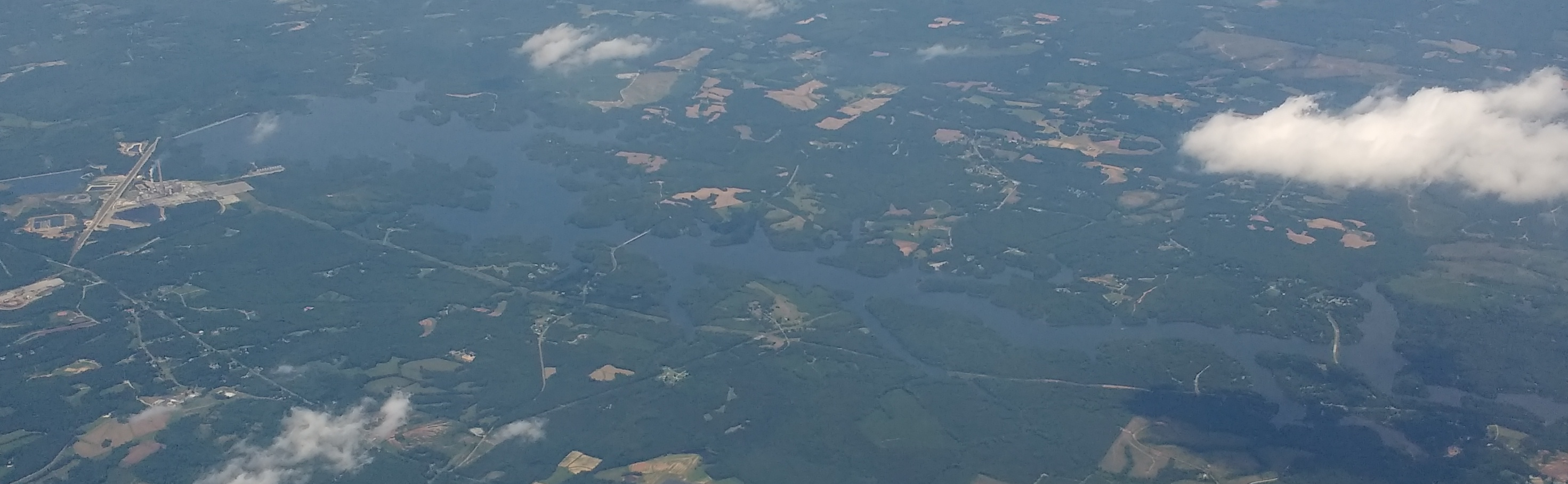
- Aerial view

- Location within North Carolina Location within the United States
- Location: Person County, North Carolina
- Coordinates: 36°31′31″N 78°52′2″W
- Type: reservoir
- Primary inflows: Mayo Creek
- Primary outflows: Mayo Creek
- Basin countries: United States
- Surface area: 2,800 acres (1,100 ha)
- Surface elevation: 433 ft (132 m)

Mayo Lake is a reservoir located in northeastern Person County, North Carolina. Boating entrance, walking trails, swimming access, picnic and camp site areas (collectively known as Mayo Park) are accessed from Neals Store Road about 9 miles north of the city of Roxboro along NC 49. It is smaller than Hyco Lake (located on the northwestern side of Person County).

Also known as Mayo Reservoir, it was created by an earthen dam impoundment of Mayo Creek (not to be confused with the Mayo River), which was completed in 1983. Construction of the reservoir was undertaken from 1978 to 1983 by Carolina Power & Light (now Duke Energy Progress, a subsidiary of Duke Energy).

The lake's shoreline is maintained in a natural state.
