= Allens Level, North Carolina =

Unincorporated community in Person County, North Carolina

Allens Level
- unincorporated community
- Interactive map of Allens Level
- Coordinates: 36.3254183°N 79.0208442°W
- Country: United States
- State: North Carolina
- County: Person County
- Elevation: 191 m (627 ft)
- Time zone: UTC-5 (Eastern Standard Time)
  - Summer (DST): UTC-4 (Eastern Daylight Time)

Allens Level is an unincorporated community in Person County, North Carolina, United States, about 5.4 miles (9 km) from the center of Roxboro, North Carolina. It is centered around the intersection of Hurdle Mills Road (also known as North Carolina Highway 157) and Flat River Church Road. Flat River Church Road becomes Huff Road west of Hurdle Mills Road.

== Geography ==
Allens Level has an elevation of 627 feet. It is part of the Eastern Standard Time Zone.

== Cemetery ==
The Roy Carver Family Cemetery is located in Allens Level.

== See also ==
- Roxboro, North Carolina
- Person County, North Carolina
