= Person County, North Carolina =

County in North Carolina, United States

- County
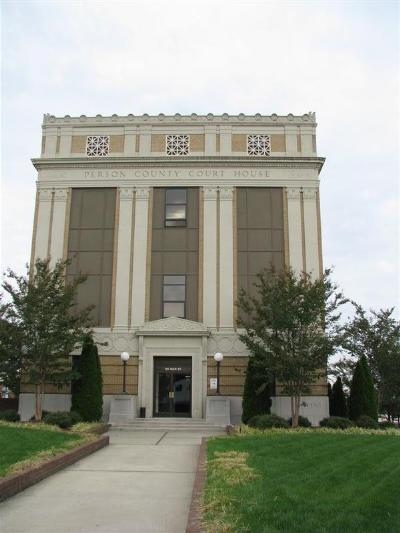
- Person County Courthouse

- Flag Seal Logo
- Motto: "Everything is Better in Person"
- Location within the U.S. state of North Carolina
- Coordinates: 36.39°N 78.97°W
- Country: United States
- State: North Carolina
- Founded: 1792
- Named for: Thomas Person
- Seat: Roxboro
- Largest community: Roxboro

Area
  - Total: 404.39 sq mi (1,047.4 km^{2})
  - Land: 392.34 sq mi (1,016.2 km^{2})
  - Water: 12.05 sq mi (31.2 km^{2}) 2.98%

Population (2020)
  - Total: 39,097
  - Estimate (2025): 40,636 ▲
  - Density: 99.65/sq mi (38.48/km^{2})
- Time zone: UTC−5 (Eastern)
  - Summer (DST): UTC−4 (EDT)
- Congressional district: 13th
- Website: www.personcountync.gov

Person County is a county located in the U.S. state of North Carolina. The population was 39,097 as of the 2020 census. The county seat is Roxboro.

Person County is included in the Durham-Chapel Hill, NC Metropolitan Statistical Area, which is also included in the Raleigh-Durham-Cary, NC Combined Statistical Area, which had an estimated population of 2,368,947 in 2023.

== History ==
The colonial government established Person County as part of Edgecombe County in 1746. County designations kept changing, and it was part of Granville County from 1746 to 1752; included in Orange County until 1778; and part of Caswell County until 1791/1792. By dividing Caswell County into two squares–each side measuring approximately twenty 20 mi (30 km) in length, the state formed two counties of 400 square miles (1,000 km^{2}) each. The county was named after Brigadier General Thomas Person, a Revolutionary War patriot, who made significant contributions to Person County and surrounding areas.

The area was first inhabited by Native Americans more than 10,000 years ago. An ancient lithic quarry, the Two Dogs Site, is located in present-day Person County, North Carolina.

The Indigenous tribes encountered here by early Spanish explorers were generally Siouan language-speaking, including the Saponi, Occaneechi, and other groups.

Settlement by immigrants of Scots-Irish, English, French Huguenot, German, and free Black ancestry began in the mid-18th and continued into the 19th centuries. The majority of settlers were yeoman farmers, and few owned any slaves.

Religious affiliation in the county reflects the early settlers and is predominantly Protestant. Due to Person County's nearness to Virginia, the Carolina coast, and the Appalachian foothills, a wide variety of Southern American English dialects can be heard here, including Virginia Piedmont, Coastal Southern, South Midland, and African-American English.

=== Revolutionary and Civil Wars ===
The county was named for Brigadier General Thomas Person, a Revolutionary War patriot, who made significant contributions to Person County and surrounding areas. He was a trustee of the University of North Carolina at Chapel Hill. His generous donations were recognized by the construction and naming of Person Hall.

Lieutenant Colonel Stephen Moore, Deputy Quartermaster General of the Hillsborough district, was another Revolutionary War hero, commanding the Person County militia at the disastrous Battle of Camden. He was captured and held on the prison ship Torbay. In 1775-1776 he had purchased property in the south of Person County and named his plantation Mt. Tirzah. His home, constructed in 1778, has been renovated recently. Stephen Moore was buried in the family cemetery.

During the Civil War, Person County supplied between 800 and 1000 soldiers to the Confederate Army. A granite monument at the Courthouse honors E. Fletcher Satterfield, who carried the Confederate flag at Gettysburg.

=== Late 19th century ===
J.A. Long, W.W. Kitchin, A.R. Foushee, J.S. Bradsher, J.C. Pass, W.F. Reade, and R.E. Long were key leaders who helped make a transition to a more diversified economic base after the Civil War. The arrival of the newly constructed Norfolk and Western Railroad was a major influence around 1890, as it enabled the addition of tobacco processing plants and warehouses to the rural economy. Although the processing plants disappeared many years ago, a few of the warehouses still stand.

J.A. Long established Peoples Bank in 1891 and the Roxboro Cotton Mill in 1899, later known as Tultex Yarns. His home at Roxboro, the James A. and Laura Thompson Long House, was added to the National Register of Historic Places in 2005. Long died in 1915 but was succeeded by his son, J.A. Long, Jr., who began attracting new business to Roxboro. Baker Company opened here in 1923, making textile manufacturing a major contributor to the local economy for decades. Baker was merged with Collins and Aikman Corporation (C&A), becoming a major industry in Person County for several decades before closing in August 2006. Textile manufacturers have moved to other locations in the US and overseas.

=== 20th and 21st centuries ===
Residential and commercial development have grown steadily over the past few years in part due to the county's location near Treyburn Corporate Park in northern Durham County, home to numerous companies and the Research Triangle region. The Hyco Lake area and southern portion of the county have had an influx of new home and commercial development in the late 20th and early 21st century.

GKN Driveline closed its Timberlake, NC plant in 2024 eliminating 500 jobs locally to consolidate North American machining and assembly operations into its Alamance County facility. The business opened in January 1994.

The Holloway-Walker Dollarhite House, Henry-Vernon House, Burleigh, and Waverly Plantation are listed on the National Register of Historic Places outside Roxboro.

== Geography ==
Interactive map of Person County

According to the U.S. Census Bureau, the county has a total area of 404.39 square miles (1,047.4 km^{2}), of which 392.34 square miles (1,016.2 km^{2}) is land and 12.05 square miles (31.2 km^{2}) (2.98%) is water.

Person County contains parts of three major river basins: the Neuse, the Roanoke and the Tar, providing essential clean drinking water to the south and east of the state. The origin of the Tar River is in southeast Person County. In the northwest section of the county is Hyco Lake, with Mayo Reservoir in the northeast section. Both lakes are used for electrical power generation and recreation. Near the western border with Caswell County is Lake Roxboro. Part of the Neuse River begins here with the Flat River, where it combines with the Little and Eno rivers to go into Falls Lake and create the Neuse.

The Uwharrie Mountains, part of North Carolina's easternmost mountain range, are the oldest mountain range in North America. They are the lowest mountain range in the state. The Uwharries begin in Montgomery County and terminate at Hager's Mountain in the hills of northern Person County.

The county is largely covered by rolling hills divided by farmlands and forest. The area's ridges are not narrow and sharp like those in some parts of the Piedmont, and the gullies and ditches are not as abrupt. The northern part of the county between the lakes is skirted by a plateau. The highest point of the county is a prominent hill in Roxboro, where the county seat has located its water reservoir tank. Person County claims three small mountains. Hager's Mountain is north of Roxboro. Red Mountain and Mt. Tirzah are in the southeastern part of the county. The geology of the county is dominated by igneous formation, overlaid by a variety of soils. Granite boulders are strewn across the county.

=== State and local protected areas ===
- Hagers Mountain
- Hyco Game Land
- Mayo Lake Park
- Mayo Game Land

=== Major water bodies ===
- After Bay Reservoir
- Byrds Creek
- Castle Creek
- Flat River
- Ghent Creek
- Hyco Lake
- Mayo Lake
- Mill Creek
- Richland Creek
- Roxboro Lake
- South Hyco Creek
- Storys Creek
- Tar River

=== Adjacent counties ===
- Halifax County, Virginia - north
- Granville County – east
- Durham County – south
- Orange County – south
- Caswell County – west

=== Major highways ===
- US 501
- US 158
- NC 49
- NC 57
- NC 157

Interstate 85 is the closest interstate highway to the county, located 29 miles south in Durham.

=== Major infrastructure ===
- Norfolk Southern, freight rail service
- Raleigh Regional Airport at Person County, located 6 miles (10 km) south of Roxboro on U.S. Route 501

Raleigh-Durham International Airport, located 42 miles (68 km) south of Roxboro. Piedmont Triad International Airport, located 82 miles (132 km) southwest of Roxboro.

== Demographics ==
Historical population
Census	Pop.	Note	%±
1800	6,402		—
1810	6,642		3.7%
1820	9,029		35.9%
1830	10,027		11.1%
1840	9,790		−2.4%
1850	10,781		10.1%
1860	11,221		4.1%
1870	11,170		−0.5%
1880	13,719		22.8%
1890	15,151		10.4%
1900	16,685		10.1%
1910	17,356		4.0%
1920	18,973		9.3%
1930	22,039		16.2%
1940	25,029		13.6%
1950	24,361		−2.7%
1960	26,394		8.3%
1970	25,914		−1.8%
1980	29,164		12.5%
1990	30,180		3.5%
2000	35,623		18.0%
2010	39,464		10.8%
2020	39,097		−0.9%
2025 (est.)	40,636	▲	3.9%
U.S. Decennial Census; 1790–1960 1900–1990; 1990–2000 2010 2020

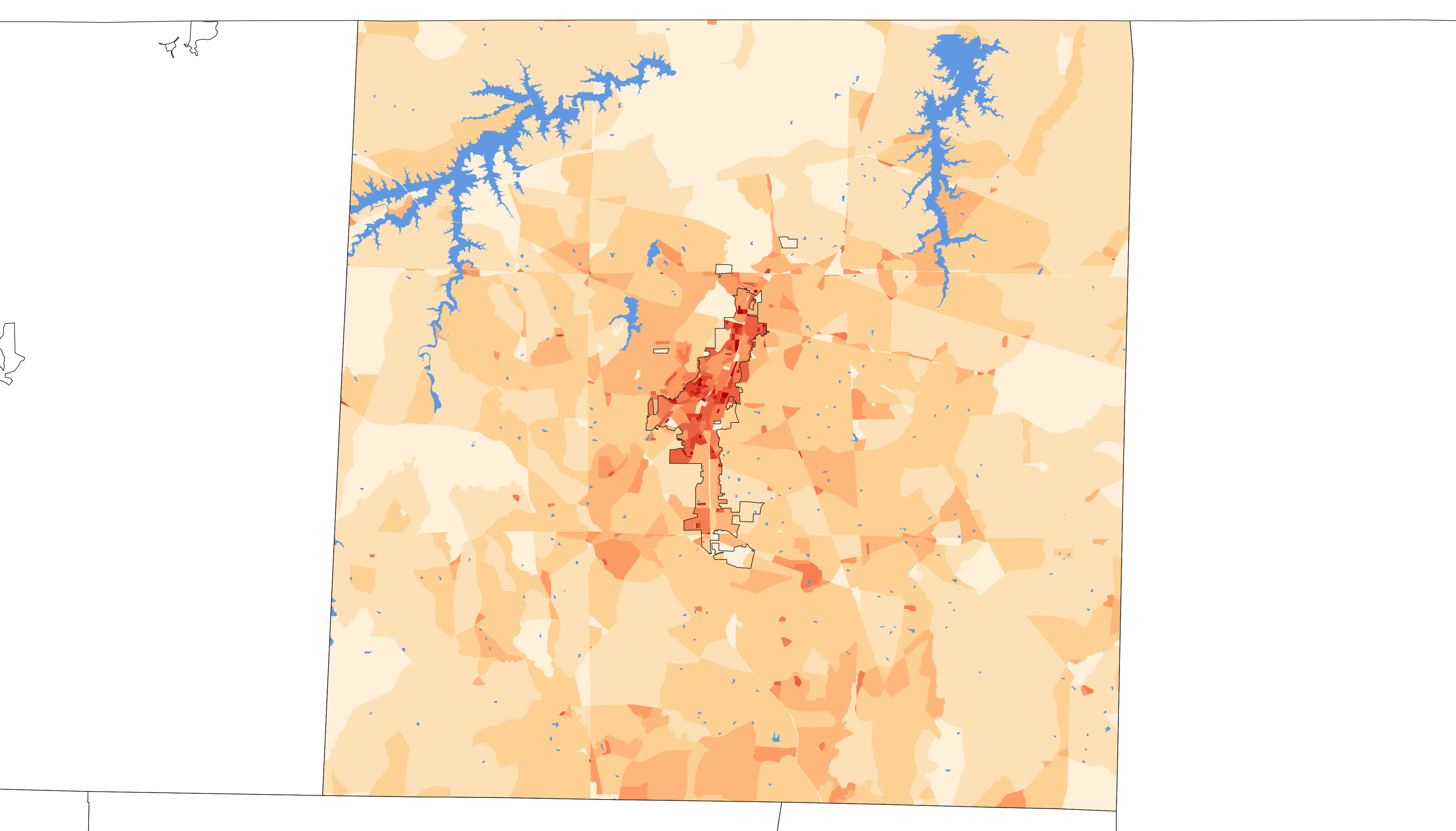
2020 population density of Person County NC by census block

=== Racial and ethnic composition ===
Person County, North Carolina – Racial and ethnic composition Note: the US Census treats Hispanic/Latino as an ethnic category. This table excludes Latinos from the racial categories and assigns them to a separate category. Hispanics/Latinos may be of any race.
Race / Ethnicity (NH = Non-Hispanic)	Pop 1980	Pop 1990	Pop 2000	Pop 2010	Pop 2020	% 1980	% 1990	% 2000	% 2010	% 2020
White alone (NH)	19,658	20,655	24,277	26,354	25,132	67.41%	68.44%	68.15%	66.78%	64.28%
Black or African American alone (NH)	9,053	9,080	10,018	10,599	9,879	31.04%	30.09%	28.12%	26.86%	25.27%
Native American or Alaska Native alone (NH)	169	179	215	244	240	0.58%	0.59%	0.60%	0.62%	0.61%
Asian alone (NH)	32	14	53	115	124	0.11%	0.05%	0.15%	0.29%	0.32%
Native Hawaiian or Pacific Islander alone (NH)	x	x	4	4	8	x	x	0.01%	0.01%	0.02%
Other race alone (NH)	16	3	45	51	121	0.05%	0.01%	0.13%	0.13%	0.31%
Mixed race or Multiracial (NH)	x	x	265	504	1,398	x	x	0.74%	1.28%	3.58%
Hispanic or Latino (any race)	236	249	746	1,593	2,195	0.81%	0.83%	2.09%	4.04%	5.61%
Total	29,164	30,180	35,623	39,464	39,097	100.00%	100.00%	100.00%	100.00%	100.00%

=== 2020 census ===
As of the 2020 census, there were 39,097 people, 15,896 households, and 10,695 families residing in the county. The median age was 45.2 years, with 20.8% of residents under the age of 18 and 20.7% of residents 65 years of age or older. For every 100 females there were 93.2 males, and for every 100 females age 18 and over there were 90.6 males age 18 and over.

The racial makeup of the county was 65.4% White, 25.4% Black or African American, 0.7% American Indian and Alaska Native, 0.3% Asian, <0.1% Native Hawaiian and Pacific Islander, 3.2% from some other race, and 5.0% from two or more races. Hispanic or Latino residents of any race comprised 5.6% of the population.

24.3% of residents lived in urban areas, while 75.7% lived in rural areas.

There were 16,176 households in the county, of which 28.7% had children under the age of 18 living in them. Of all households, 45.5% were married-couple households, 18.1% were households with a male householder and no spouse or partner present, and 30.1% were households with a female householder and no spouse or partner present. About 28.3% of all households were made up of individuals and 13.7% had someone living alone who was 65 years of age or older.

There were 18,284 housing units, of which 11.5% were vacant. Among occupied housing units, 72.7% were owner-occupied and 27.3% were renter-occupied. The homeowner vacancy rate was 1.4% and the rental vacancy rate was 6.4%.

=== 2010 census ===
At the 2010 census, there were 39,464 people, 15,826 households, and 10,979 families residing in the county. The population density was 91 people per square mile (35 people/km^{2}). There were 15,504 housing units at an average density of 40 units per square mile (15 units/km^{2}). The racial makeup of the county was 68.1% White, 28.3% Black, 0.61% Native American, 0.15% Asian, 0.01% Pacific Islander, 1.37% from other races, and 0.86% from two or more races. Hispanic or Latino people of any race were 2.09% of the population.

There were 14,085 households, out of which 31.5% had children under the age of 18 living with them, 53.8% were married couples living together, 13.8% had a female householder with no husband present, and 28.2% were non-families. 24.2% of all households were made up of individuals, and 10.1% had someone living alone who was 65 years of age or older. The average household size was 2.50 and the average family size was 2.95.

In the county, the population was spread out, with 24.0% under the age of 18, 7.4% from 18 to 24, 30.6% from 25 to 44, 24.2% from 45 to 64, and 13.3% who were 65 years of age or older. The median age was 38 years. For every 100 females there were 93.2 males. For every 100 females age 18 and over, there were 90.2 males.

The median income for a household in the county was $42,559 and the median income for a family was $54,474. Males had a median income of $30,970 versus $22,804 for females. The per capita income for the county was $22,189. About 9.4% of families and 12.0% of the population were below the poverty line, including 14.9% of those under age 18 and 17.3% of those age 65 or over.

== Law, government, and politics ==
Person County is a member of the Kerr-Tar Regional Council of Governments. The county government is administered by an elected county commission, and county law enforcement is administered by an elected sheriff and his officers. The county is politically conservative and Republican. No Democratic presidential candidate has carried Person County since Jimmy Carter in 1980. Before being won by George Wallace in 1968, Person County had been part of the Democratic "Solid South", voting Democrat in most elections between 1880 and 1964, except the elections in 1892 and 1908, with six consecutive Democratic presidential nominees receiving 75 percent of the county's vote between 1932 and 1952.

United States presidential election results for Person County, North Carolina
Year	Republican		Democratic		Third party(ies)	
Year	No.	%	No.	%	No.	%
1912	784	43.85%	820	45.86%	184	10.29%
1916	917	49.04%	953	50.96%	0	0.00%
1920	1,566	48.75%	1,646	51.25%	0	0.00%
1924	1,025	39.36%	1,576	60.52%	3	0.12%
1928	1,123	47.63%	1,235	52.37%	0	0.00%
1932	660	21.65%	2,372	77.80%	17	0.56%
1936	384	11.70%	2,898	88.30%	0	0.00%
1940	432	11.77%	3,239	88.23%	0	0.00%
1944	607	19.49%	2,507	80.51%	0	0.00%
1948	480	12.79%	3,087	82.28%	185	4.93%
1952	1,374	24.36%	4,266	75.64%	0	0.00%
1956	1,740	33.64%	3,433	66.36%	0	0.00%
1960	1,926	30.91%	4,305	69.09%	0	0.00%
1964	2,162	31.32%	4,740	68.68%	0	0.00%
1968	2,138	24.17%	2,644	29.89%	4,065	45.95%
1972	5,941	71.89%	2,246	27.18%	77	0.93%
1976	3,038	43.20%	3,977	56.55%	18	0.26%
1980	3,281	43.55%	4,111	54.57%	142	1.88%
1984	5,854	62.30%	3,528	37.54%	15	0.16%
1988	4,832	56.00%	3,777	43.78%	19	0.22%
1992	4,460	43.60%	4,323	42.26%	1,447	14.14%
1996	4,883	48.68%	4,540	45.26%	607	6.05%
2000	6,722	56.81%	5,042	42.61%	69	0.58%
2004	8,973	58.98%	6,198	40.74%	43	0.28%
2008	10,030	53.83%	8,446	45.33%	156	0.84%
2012	10,496	54.94%	8,418	44.06%	192	1.00%
2016	11,185	57.02%	7,833	39.93%	597	3.04%
2020	13,184	60.22%	8,465	38.66%	245	1.12%
2024	13,509	61.30%	8,295	37.64%	232	1.05%

=== Elected officials ===
Elected officials in Person County (as of 2024):

- Valerie Foushee (D), representative for North Carolina's 4th congressional district
- Graig Meyer (D), representative for North Carolina's 23rd Senate district
- Ray Jeffers (D), representative for North Carolina's 2nd House district
- Jason Wilborn (R), sheriff
- Sherry Wilborn (R), county commissioner
- Gordon Powell (R), county commissioner
- Kyle W. Puryear (R), county commissioner (chair)
- Antoinetta Cash-Royster (D), county commissioner
- Jason D. Thomas (R), county commissioner (vice-chair)
- Margaret Bradsher, school board member
- Phillip Gillis, school board vice-chair
- Harriett Tillet, school board member
- Freda Tillman, school board chair
- Jason Torian, school board member

== Economy ==
The economy of Person County is dominated by electrical, textile, administrative, manufacturing, aerodynamics, viticulture, brokering, food processing, automotive, aluminum and paper products. Diversification from traditional flue cured tobacco to include burley tobacco and other modes of agriculture is underway.

Person County is home to two industrial parks: Person County Business and Industrial Center (PCBIC), located on Durham Road (US 501), and North Park, located north of Roxboro on North Park Drive.

Person County is also near Treyburn Corporate Park in northern Durham County, home to several companies.

Person County offers a strategic location for business and industry, as it is within an hour's drive of North Carolina's two major economic centers, the Research Triangle (Durham, Chapel Hill and Raleigh) and the Piedmont Triad (Greensboro, Winston-Salem and High Point), and within a two-hour drive of Richmond, Virginia.

Microsoft Corporation purchased the 1,350-acre Person County Mega Park in October 2024 for about $27 million.

The county's current largest employers are Duke Energy, Eaton Corporation, Georgia-Pacific Corporation, Polywood, Spuntech and Person County schools.

== Healthcare ==
- Person Memorial Hospital. Affiliated with the Duke University Health System
- Roxboro MedAccess
- Person County Medical and Dental

== Education ==
=== Higher education ===
- Piedmont Community College offers associate degrees, technical training programs, and college credit which is transferable to local state supported colleges/universities. There is a satellite campus in neighboring Caswell County.

=== Public education ===
==== Person County School System ====
Public education is provided by the Person County School System, which administers a single unified school district with a K-12 program. As of fiscal 2018–2019, the school system consists of:

- 4,364 students
- 555+ staff

Person County schools
Name	Principal/Director	Mascot	Colors	Enrollment as of 2021-2022
Earl Bradsher Pre-School Center (Pre-K)	Treco Lea-Jeffers, Director	Shining Stars		186
Early Intervention & Family Services (Pre-K)	Dana Faulkner, Director			
Helena Elementary (K-5)	Sherita Fuller, Principal	Hornets	Black, yellow	500
Carolina Community Academy (K-2)	Daniel Watson, Principal	Tarheels	Blue, white	217
North End Elementary (K-5)	Melody Wilson, Principal	Jets	Red, blue	179
Oak Lane Elementary (K-5)	Heather Bowling, Principal	Cougars	Green, white	223
Stories Creek Elementary (K-5)	Dwayne Johnson, Principal	Gators	Green, yellow	377
South Elementary (K-5)	Rhonda Daye, Principal	Shooting Stars	Orange, yellow	356
Woodland Elementary (K-5)	Ashley Warren, Principal	Lakers	Blue, white	213
Northern Middle (6-8)	Dusty Martin, Principal	Raiders	Purple, blue, black	418
Southern Middle (6-8)	Whitney Sharlow, Principal	Panthers	Blue, white	485
Person High (9-12)	Sam Wilkins, Principal	Rockets	Blue, white, cardinal	1,080
Person County Learning Academy (6-10)	Jennifer Tong, Director			50
Person County Schools Virtual Academy (4-12)	Dr. Tisha Duncan, Principal			134
Person Early College for Innovation & Leadership	Shirlona Johnson, Principal	Mavericks	Green, White, Orange	151

==== Charter schools ====
The State of North Carolina also provides for a certain number of charter schools. These are administered separately from the Person County School System. Roxboro has two charter schools:

- Bethel Hill Charter School, an alternative public school that offers young kids an alternative for grades K–5, opened for the 2000–2001 school year. Previously the school served up to grade 6. However, it was eliminated starting in the 2016–17 school year. Total enrollment is 385.
- Roxboro Community School, an alternative to the state public school system, is located in uptown Roxboro. It is housed in the historic Roxboro Cotton Mill/Tultex building, which is on the National Register of Historic Places. The school opened for the 2006–2007 school year. Currently serves grades 6–12. Total enrollment is 700.

=== Private education ===
- Legacy Christian Academy was founded in 2022 and serves a PreK-12 program. Total enrollment is 40.
- Zion Christian Academy was founded in 2002 and offers a 1-12 program. Total enrollment is 30.

== Communities ==
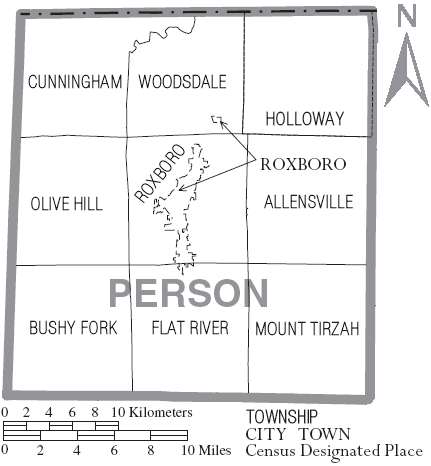
Map of Person County with municipal and township labels

=== City ===
- Roxboro (county seat and largest community)

=== Census-designated place ===
- Rougemont (also in Durham County)

=== Townships ===
- Allensville
- Bushy Fork
- Cunningham
- Flat River
- Holloway
- Mount Tirzah
- Olive Hill
- Roxboro
- Woodsdale

=== Unincorporated communities ===
- Ai
- Allens Level
- Allensville
- Bethel Hill
- Brooksdale
- Bushy Fork
- Ca-Vel
- Ceffo
- Concord
- Cunningham
- Denny Store
- Five Forks
- Gentry Store
- Gordonton
- Hesters Store
- Hurdle Mills (also in Orange County)
- Leasburg (part; mostly in Caswell County)
- Longhurst
- Longs Store
- Moriah
- Mount Tirzah
- Olive Hill
- Paynes Tavern
- Peeds Store
- Roseville
- Semora (part; mostly in Caswell County)
- Somerset
- Surl
- Timberlake
- Triple Springs
- Whitt Town
- Woodsdale

== Notable people ==
- Henry Atkinson, soldier
- Leonidas Berry, medical doctor, inventor of Eder-Berry biopsy gastroscope
- Robert L. Blackwell, one of two soldiers from North Carolina to receive the Medal of Honor for service during World War I; killed in action on October 11, 1918
- Margie Bowes, country music singer
- Mic'hael Brooks, defensive tackle for the Seattle Seahawks
- Anderson Clayton, chairperson of the North Carolina Democratic Party
- Carl Long, NASCAR driver
- Tom Long (CEO), former President and CEO of Miller Brewing Company
- Darius McGhee, professional basketball player
- Wendy Palmer, former WNBA player
- James E. Ramsey, politician, North Carolina House of Representatives, former Speaker of the North Carolina House of Representatives
- Ray Scott, country music singer
- Enos Slaughter or "Country", St. Louis Cardinals, and Baseball Hall of Fame inductee
- Jim Thorpe, Champions Tour golfer
- Luke Torian, politician, Virginia House of Delegates 52nd district

== See also ==
- List of counties in North Carolina
- National Register of Historic Places listings in Person County, North Carolina
- Sappony, state-recognized tribe that resides in the county
