= 1968 United States presidential election in North Carolina =

- November 5, 1968

| Nominee | Richard Nixon | George Wallace | Hubert Humphrey |
| Party | Republican | American Independent | Democratic |
| Home state | New York (Note: Although he was born in California and he served as a U.S. senator from California, in 1968 Richard Nixon's official state of residence was New York, because he moved there to practice law after his defeat in the 1962 California gubernatorial election. During his first term as president, Nixon re-established his residency in California. Consequently, most reliable reference books list Nixon's home state as New York in the 1968 election and his home state as California in the 1972 (and 1960) election.) | Alabama | Minnesota |
| Running mate | Spiro T. Agnew | Curtis LeMay | Edmund Muskie |
| Electoral vote | 12 | 1 | 0 |
| Popular vote | 627,192 | 496,188 | 464,113 |
| Percentage | 39.51% | 31.26% | 29.24% |

Nixon
30–40%
40–50%
50–60%
60–70%
70–80%
Wallace
30–40%
40–50%
50–60%
Humphrey
30–40%
40–50%
50–60%
President before election
Lyndon B. Johnson
Democratic
Elected President
Richard Nixon
Republican

The 1968 United States presidential election in North Carolina took place on November 5, 1968, and was part of the 1968 United States presidential election. Voters chose 13 representatives, or electors to the Electoral College, who voted for president and vice president. Whereas in the Deep South, Black Belt whites had deserted the national Democratic Party in 1948, in North Carolina, where they had historically been an economically liberalizing influence on the state Democratic Party, the white landowners of the Black Belt had stayed exceedingly loyal to the party until after the Voting Rights Act. This allowed North Carolina to be, along with Arkansas, the only state to vote for Democrats in all four presidential elections between 1952 and 1964. Indeed, the state had not voted Republican since anti-Catholic fervor lead it to support Herbert Hoover over Al Smith in 1928; and other than that the state had not voted Republican once in the century since the Reconstruction era election of 1872. Nonetheless, in 1964 Republican Barry Goldwater may have won a small majority of white voters, (Note: Other election scholars have doubted Goldwater won the white vote in the state, which undoubtedly was extremely close.) although he was beaten by virtually universal support for incumbent President Lyndon Johnson by a black vote estimated at 175 thousand.

However, with the Voting Rights Act's passage, a reaction set in amongst these, and indeed amongst almost all Southern poor whites outside the unionized coalfields of Appalachia. Former Alabama Governor George Wallace, running in North Carolina under the moniker of the “American Party”, appealed very strongly to most white voters in the eastern half of the state who had become extremely critical of black protesters, student radicals, and rising crime rates.

In early polls it was thought that Wallace would carry the state, but a major swing against him and toward Republican nominee Richard Nixon during October and November saw Nixon win the state, with 39.5 percent of the vote, whilst Wallace's 31.3 percent still pushed Democratic nominee and incumbent Vice-President Hubert Humphrey into third on 29.2 percent. The Alabama segregationist carried almost all of the Piedmont and Outer Banks, and some Black Belt areas where black voter registration was still limited – the very areas that had allowed John F. Kennedy and Adlai Stevenson II to carry North Carolina when other Outer South states went Republican. In these previously loyal regions whites felt President Johnson had moved much too far on civil rights issues, and consequent support for highly segregationist candidates in Democratic primary elections led them naturally to Wallace. Humphrey had very limited support outside of black voters, who were estimated to comprise well over half his total vote in the state, with his share of the white vote totaling less than 20 percent and coming mainly from some traditionally Democratic mountain counties and the university communities of Orange and Durham counties. Among white voters, 48% supported Nixon, 41% supported Wallace, and 12% supported Humphrey.

Nixon won twelve of the state's electoral votes, while one faithless elector that had been pledged to Nixon voted instead for Wallace. As of the 2020 presidential election, this is the last election in which Wayne County and Lenoir County did not vote for the Republican presidential candidate.

== Results ==
1968 United States presidential election in North Carolina
| Party | Candidate | Votes | Percentage | Electoral votes |
|---|---|---|---|---|
| Republican | Richard Nixon | 627,192 | 39.51% | 12 |
| American | George Wallace | 496,188 | 31.26% | 1 |
| Democratic | Hubert Humphrey | 464,113 | 29.24% | 0 |
| Totals | | 1,587,493 | 100.0% | 13 |
| Voter turnout | | | | — |

=== Results by county ===
| County | Richard Nixon Republican | | George Wallace American Independent | | Hubert Humphrey Democratic | | Margin | | Total |
| County | # | % | # | % | # | % | # | % | Total |
|---|---|---|---|---|---|---|---|---|---|
| Alamance | 12,310 | 36.54% | 13,139 | 39.00% | 8,241 | 24.46% | -829 | -2.46% | 33,690 |
| Alexander | 4,379 | 52.03% | 2,203 | 26.18% | 1,834 | 21.79% | 2,176 | 25.85% | 8,416 |
| Alleghany | 1,695 | 45.80% | 904 | 24.43% | 1,102 | 29.78% | 593 (Note: In this county where Wallace did run third behind both Nixon and Humphrey, margin given is Nixon vote minus Humphrey vote and percentage margin Nixon percentage minus Humphrey percentage.) | 16.02% | 3,701 |
| Anson | 1,474 | 18.39% | 3,571 | 44.56% | 2,969 | 37.05% | -602 (Note: In this county where Nixon ran third behind both Wallace and Humphrey, margin given is Humphrey vote minus Wallace vote and percentage margin Humphrey percentage minus Wallace percentage.) | -7.51% | 8,014 |
| Ashe | 4,894 | 53.15% | 888 | 9.64% | 3,426 | 37.21% | 1,468 | 15.94% | 9,208 |
| Avery | 3,197 | 70.76% | 690 | 15.27% | 631 | 13.97% | 2,507 | 55.49% | 4,518 |
| Beaufort | 2,669 | 23.03% | 5,686 | 49.07% | 3,232 | 27.89% | -2,454 | -21.18% | 11,587 |
| Bertie | 811 | 11.38% | 3,108 | 43.61% | 3,207 | 45.00% | 99 | 1.39% | 7,126 |
| Bladen | 1,746 | 20.79% | 3,897 | 46.41% | 2,754 | 32.80% | -1,143 | -13.61% | 8,397 |
| Brunswick | 2,404 | 27.52% | 3,358 | 38.45% | 2,972 | 34.03% | -386 | -4.42% | 8,734 |
| Buncombe | 21,031 | 44.23% | 11,889 | 25.01% | 14,624 | 30.76% | 6,407 | 13.47% | 47,544 |
| Burke | 11,068 | 48.84% | 5,892 | 26.00% | 5,704 | 25.17% | 5,176 | 22.84% | 22,664 |
| Cabarrus | 13,226 | 52.35% | 6,538 | 25.88% | 5,501 | 21.77% | 6,688 | 26.47% | 25,265 |
| Caldwell | 10,433 | 51.46% | 5,095 | 25.13% | 4,746 | 23.41% | 5,338 | 26.33% | 20,274 |
| Camden | 180 | 9.06% | 1,100 | 55.36% | 707 | 35.58% | -393 | -19.78% | 1,987 |
| Carteret | 4,593 | 40.23% | 3,061 | 26.81% | 3,762 | 32.95% | 831 | 7.28% | 11,416 |
| Caswell | 1,036 | 17.20% | 2,851 | 47.33% | 2,137 | 35.47% | -714 | -11.86% | 6,024 |
| Catawba | 18,393 | 56.33% | 7,285 | 22.31% | 6,974 | 21.36% | 11,108 | 34.02% | 32,652 |
| Chatham | 3,845 | 36.22% | 3,239 | 30.51% | 3,532 | 33.27% | 313 | 2.95% | 10,616 |
| Cherokee | 3,768 | 53.18% | 915 | 12.91% | 2,402 | 33.90% | 1,366 | 19.28% | 7,085 |
| Chowan | 798 | 21.60% | 1,696 | 45.90% | 1,201 | 32.50% | -495 | -13.40% | 3,695 |
| Clay | 1,390 | 54.94% | 293 | 11.58% | 847 | 33.48% | 543 | 21.46% | 2,530 |
| Cleveland | 7,298 | 32.28% | 9,649 | 42.68% | 5,661 | 25.04% | -2,351 | -10.40% | 22,608 |
| Columbus | 3,881 | 26.19% | 6,693 | 45.17% | 4,243 | 28.64% | -2,450 | -16.53% | 14,817 |
| Craven | 2,991 | 21.77% | 6,509 | 47.37% | 4,240 | 30.86% | -2,269 | -16.51% | 13,740 |
| Cumberland | 9,143 | 31.95% | 9,539 | 33.33% | 9,938 | 34.72% | 399 | 1.39% | 28,620 |
| Currituck | 363 | 14.11% | 1,471 | 57.19% | 738 | 28.69% | -733 | -28.50% | 2,572 |
| Dare | 1,035 | 40.13% | 844 | 32.73% | 700 | 27.14% | 191 | 7.40% | 2,579 |
| Davidson | 16,678 | 46.57% | 11,544 | 32.23% | 7,594 | 21.20% | 5,134 | 14.34% | 35,816 |
| Davie | 3,866 | 49.04% | 2,515 | 31.90% | 1,502 | 19.05% | 1,351 | 17.14% | 7,883 |
| Duplin | 2,724 | 22.22% | 6,082 | 49.62% | 3,451 | 28.16% | -2,631 | -21.46% | 12,257 |
| Durham | 12,705 | 29.68% | 13,542 | 31.63% | 16,563 | 38.69% | 3,021 | 7.06% | 42,810 |
| Edgecombe | 3,198 | 22.36% | 5,861 | 40.98% | 5,243 | 36.66% | -618 | -4.32% | 14,302 |
| Forsyth | 31,623 | 46.79% | 15,681 | 23.20% | 20,281 | 30.01% | 11,342 | 16.79% | 67,585 |
| Franklin | 1,375 | 14.10% | 5,525 | 56.64% | 2,855 | 29.27% | -2,670 | -27.37% | 9,755 |
| Gaston | 18,741 | 43.77% | 13,973 | 32.64% | 10,100 | 23.59% | 4,768 | 11.13% | 42,814 |
| Gates | 406 | 14.58% | 1,227 | 44.07% | 1,151 | 41.34% | -76 | -2.73% | 2,784 |
| Graham | 1,570 | 52.44% | 363 | 12.12% | 1,061 | 35.44% | 509 | 17.00% | 2,994 |
| Granville | 1,837 | 21.50% | 4,071 | 47.64% | 2,638 | 30.87% | -1,433 | -16.77% | 8,546 |
| Greene | 650 | 12.71% | 2,906 | 56.80% | 1,560 | 30.49% | -1,346 | -26.31% | 5,116 |
| Guilford | 38,996 | 46.23% | 19,751 | 23.42% | 25,604 | 30.35% | 13,392 | 15.88% | 84,351 |
| Halifax | 3,148 | 20.72% | 7,116 | 46.84% | 4,927 | 32.43% | -2,189 | -14.41% | 15,191 |
| Harnett | 5,184 | 32.97% | 6,531 | 41.54% | 4,007 | 25.49% | -1,347 | -8.57% | 15,722 |
| Haywood | 6,205 | 39.26% | 3,898 | 24.66% | 5,703 | 36.08% | 502 | 3.18% | 15,806 |
| Henderson | 9,334 | 57.45% | 3,861 | 23.76% | 3,053 | 18.79% | 5,473 | 33.69% | 16,248 |
| Hertford | 1,125 | 17.04% | 2,203 | 33.36% | 3,275 | 49.60% | 1,072 | 16.24% | 6,603 |
| Hoke | 812 | 17.88% | 1,545 | 34.02% | 2,185 | 48.11% | 640 | 14.09% | 4,542 |
| Hyde | 401 | 20.02% | 833 | 41.59% | 769 | 38.39% | -64 | -3.20% | 2,003 |
| Iredell | 10,557 | 43.17% | 9,021 | 36.89% | 4,878 | 19.95% | 1,536 | 6.28% | 24,456 |
| Jackson | 3,747 | 48.14% | 1,080 | 13.88% | 2,956 | 37.98% | 791 | 10.16% | 7,783 |
| Johnston | 6,764 | 33.05% | 9,212 | 45.01% | 4,492 | 21.95% | -2,448 | -11.96% | 20,468 |
| Jones | 361 | 10.72% | 1,780 | 52.88% | 1,225 | 36.39% | -555 | -16.49% | 3,366 |
| Lee | 2,586 | 29.32% | 3,711 | 42.07% | 2,524 | 28.61% | -1,125 | -12.75% | 8,821 |
| Lenoir | 3,844 | 24.43% | 8,036 | 51.08% | 3,853 | 24.49% | -4,183 | -26.59% | 15,733 |
| Lincoln | 6,188 | 46.20% | 3,161 | 23.60% | 4,044 | 30.19% | 2,144 | 16.01% | 13,393 |
| Macon | 3,295 | 50.48% | 1,162 | 17.80% | 2,070 | 31.71% | 1,225 | 18.77% | 6,527 |
| Madison | 3,130 | 49.18% | 1,034 | 16.25% | 2,201 | 34.58% | 929 | 14.60% | 6,365 |
| Martin | 1,221 | 14.97% | 3,818 | 46.81% | 3,118 | 38.22% | -700 | -8.59% | 8,157 |
| McDowell | 4,740 | 46.01% | 3,018 | 29.30% | 2,543 | 24.69% | 1,722 | 16.71% | 10,301 |
| Mecklenburg | 56,325 | 52.40% | 20,070 | 18.67% | 31,102 | 28.93% | 25,223 | 23.47% | 107,497 |
| Mitchell | 3,778 | 72.65% | 603 | 11.60% | 819 | 15.75% | 2,959 | 56.90% | 5,200 |
| Montgomery | 3,070 | 39.67% | 2,259 | 29.19% | 2,410 | 31.14% | 660 | 8.53% | 7,739 |
| Moore | 5,322 | 43.74% | 3,263 | 26.82% | 3,583 | 29.45% | 1,739 | 14.29% | 12,168 |
| Nash | 4,602 | 24.08% | 9,230 | 48.29% | 5,283 | 27.64% | -3,947 | -20.65% | 19,115 |
| New Hanover | 10,020 | 37.03% | 9,291 | 34.33% | 7,750 | 28.64% | 729 | 2.70% | 27,061 |
| Northampton | 860 | 10.86% | 2,986 | 37.71% | 4,072 | 51.43% | 1,086 | 13.72% | 7,918 |
| Onslow | 3,444 | 28.08% | 5,542 | 45.18% | 3,281 | 26.75% | -2,098 | -17.10% | 12,267 |
| Orange | 6,097 | 33.30% | 3,845 | 21.00% | 8,366 | 45.70% | -2,269 | -12.40% | 18,308 |
| Pamlico | 745 | 21.46% | 1,447 | 41.68% | 1,280 | 36.87% | -167 | -4.81% | 3,472 |
| Pasquotank | 1,430 | 18.84% | 3,597 | 47.39% | 2,564 | 33.78% | -1,033 | -13.61% | 7,591 |
| Pender | 1,007 | 17.76% | 2,720 | 47.98% | 1,942 | 34.26% | -778 | -13.72% | 5,669 |
| Perquimans | 468 | 15.37% | 1,554 | 51.03% | 1,023 | 33.60% | -531 | -17.43% | 3,045 |
| Person | 2,138 | 24.17% | 4,065 | 45.95% | 2,644 | 29.89% | -1,421 | -16.06% | 8,847 |
| Pitt | 5,745 | 25.41% | 9,167 | 40.55% | 7,696 | 34.04% | -1,471 | -6.51% | 22,608 |
| Polk | 2,550 | 45.89% | 1,484 | 26.71% | 1,523 | 27.41% | 1,027 | 18.48% | 5,557 |
| Randolph | 13,450 | 52.35% | 6,892 | 26.82% | 5,351 | 20.83% | 6,558 | 25.53% | 25,693 |
| Richmond | 2,865 | 22.78% | 5,457 | 43.38% | 4,257 | 33.84% | -1,200 | -9.54% | 12,579 |
| Robeson | 4,526 | 23.55% | 6,441 | 33.52% | 8,248 | 42.92% | 1,807 | 9.40% | 19,215 |
| Rockingham | 8,095 | 33.46% | 9,324 | 38.54% | 6,774 | 28.00% | -1,229 | -5.08% | 24,193 |
| Rowan | 15,207 | 46.79% | 9,220 | 28.37% | 8,074 | 24.84% | 5,987 | 18.42% | 32,501 |
| Rutherford | 7,785 | 46.11% | 4,476 | 26.51% | 4,622 | 27.38% | 3,163 | 18.73% | 16,883 |
| Sampson | 6,597 | 41.44% | 4,527 | 28.43% | 4,797 | 30.13% | 1,800 | 11.31% | 15,921 |
| Scotland | 1,717 | 28.69% | 2,016 | 33.68% | 2,252 | 37.63% | 236 | 3.95% | 5,985 |
| Stanly | 9,428 | 51.43% | 4,706 | 25.67% | 4,199 | 22.90% | 4,722 | 25.76% | 18,333 |
| Stokes | 4,781 | 45.25% | 3,410 | 32.28% | 2,374 | 22.47% | 1,371 | 12.97% | 10,565 |
| Surry | 9,638 | 51.19% | 4,103 | 21.79% | 5,088 | 27.02% | 4,550 | 24.17% | 18,829 |
| Swain | 1,494 | 45.86% | 537 | 16.48% | 1,227 | 37.66% | 267 | 8.20% | 3,258 |
| Transylvania | 4,033 | 46.85% | 2,365 | 27.47% | 2,210 | 25.67% | 1,668 | 19.38% | 8,608 |
| Tyrrell | 291 | 22.61% | 415 | 32.25% | 581 | 45.14% | 166 | 12.89% | 1,287 |
| Union | 5,290 | 38.67% | 4,761 | 34.80% | 3,630 | 26.53% | 529 | 3.87% | 13,681 |
| Vance | 2,252 | 19.84% | 5,244 | 46.21% | 3,852 | 33.94% | -1,392 | -12.27% | 11,348 |
| Wake | 28,928 | 43.08% | 17,250 | 25.69% | 20,979 | 31.24% | 7,949 | 11.84% | 67,157 |
| Warren | 796 | 14.79% | 2,294 | 42.62% | 2,293 | 42.60% | -1 | -0.02% | 5,383 |
| Washington | 1,016 | 21.26% | 1,866 | 39.04% | 1,898 | 39.71% | 32 | 0.67% | 4,780 |
| Watauga | 5,081 | 55.88% | 1,060 | 11.66% | 2,952 | 32.46% | 2,129 | 23.42% | 9,093 |
| Wayne | 5,678 | 28.79% | 8,709 | 44.15% | 5,338 | 27.06% | -3,031 | -15.36% | 19,725 |
| Wilkes | 11,195 | 60.29% | 2,876 | 15.49% | 4,497 | 24.22% | 6,698 | 36.07% | 18,568 |
| Wilson | 4,053 | 25.13% | 7,903 | 49.00% | 4,173 | 25.87% | -3,730 | -23.13% | 16,129 |
| Yadkin | 5,885 | 60.51% | 2,397 | 24.65% | 1,443 | 14.84% | 3,488 | 35.86% | 9,725 |
| Yancey | 2,448 | 45.21% | 752 | 13.89% | 2,215 | 40.90% | 233 | 4.31% | 5,415 |
| Totals | 627,192 | 39.51% | 496,188 | 31.26% | 464,113 | 29.24% | 131,004 | 8.25% | 1,587,493 |

==== Counties that flipped from Democratic to Republican ====
- Watauga
- Ashe
- Clay
- Graham
- Cherokee
- Jackson
- Mecklenburg
- Madison
- Macon
- Yancey
- Surry
- Swain
- Caldwell
- Forsyth
- Guilford
- Lincoln
- Alleghany
- Rutherford
- Transylvania
- Buncombe
- Polk
- Rowan
- Wake
- Moore
- McDowell
- Haywood
- Carteret
- Sampson
- Stokes
- Gaston
- Montgomery
- Dare
- Chatham
- Union
- New Hanover

==== Counties that flipped from Democratic to American Independent ====
- Alamance
- Harnett
- Rockingham
- Cleveland
- Brunswick
- Pitt
- Johnston
- Lee
- Wayne
- Onslow
- Edgecombe
- Columbus
- Pamlico
- Richmond
- Hyde
- Person
- Nash
- Wilson
- Chowan
- Craven
- Bladen
- Beaufort
- Granville
- Halifax
- Anson
- Vance
- Lenoir
- Duplin
- Warren
- Pasquotank
- Gates
- Caswell
- Pender
- Martin
- Jones
- Perquimans
- Currituck
- Franklin
- Greene
- Camden

== Works cited ==
- Black, Earl; Black, Merle (1992). The Vital South: How Presidents Are Elected. Harvard University Press. ISBN 0674941306.
