= 1948 United States presidential election in North Carolina =

- November 2, 1948

All 14 North Carolina votes to the Electoral College

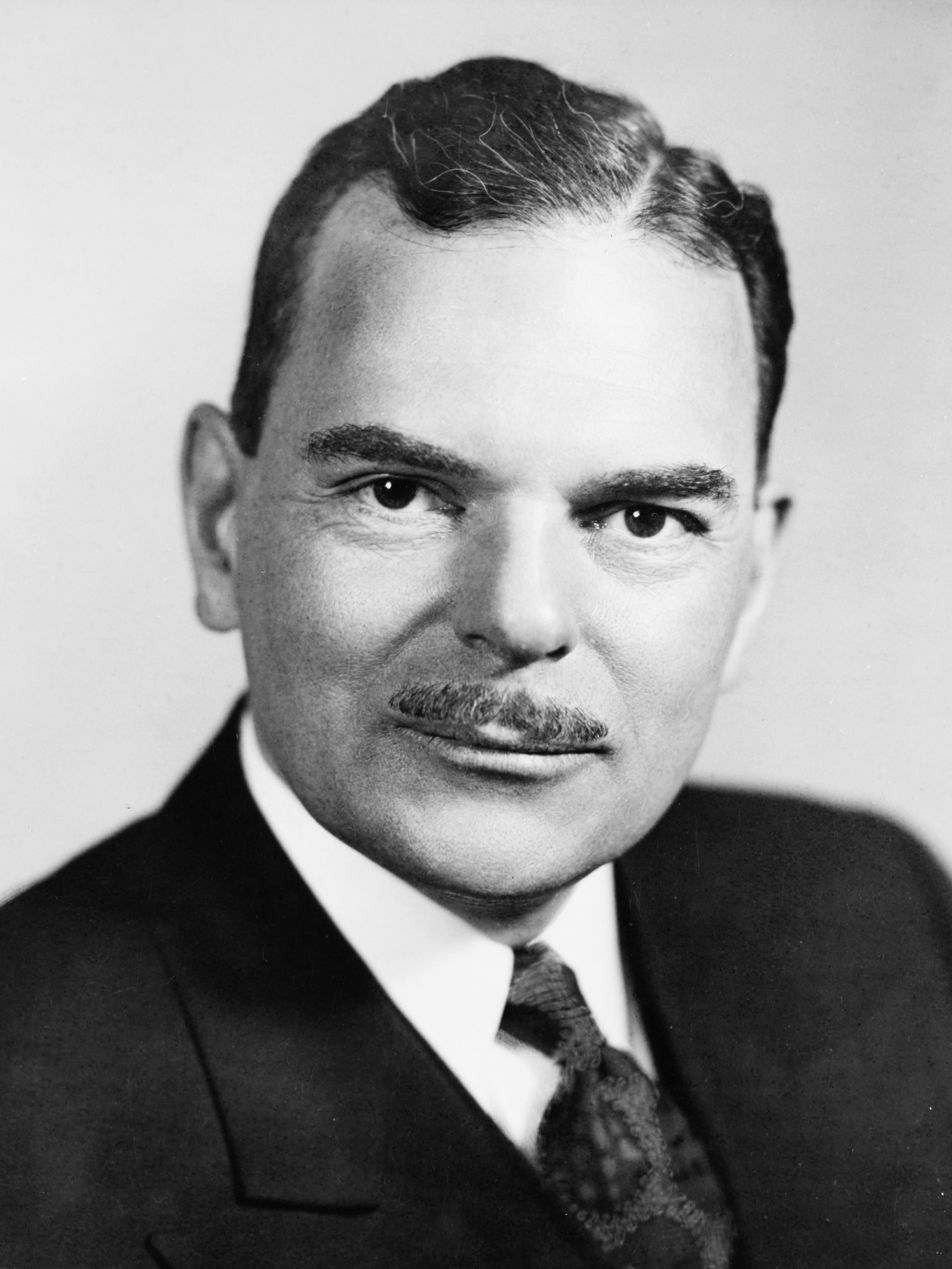

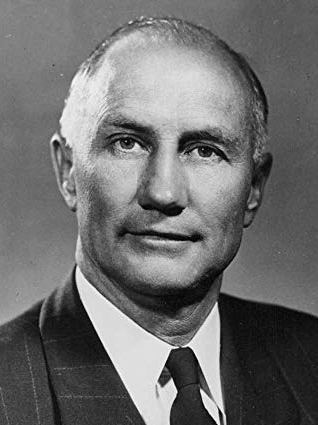
Nominee	Harry S. Truman	Thomas E. Dewey	Strom Thurmond
Party	Democratic	Republican	States’ Rights Democratic
Home state	Missouri	New York	South Carolina
Running mate	Alben W. Barkley	Earl Warren	Fielding L. Wright
Electoral vote	14	0	0
Popular vote	459,070	258,572	69,652
Percentage	58.02%	32.68%	8.80%
County results
Truman
30–40%
40–50%
50–60%
60–70%
70–80%
80–90%
90–100%
Dewey
40–50%
50–60%
60–70%
70–80%
President before election
Harry S. Truman
Democratic
Elected President
Harry S. Truman
Democratic

The 1948 United States presidential election in North Carolina took place on November 2, 1948, as part of the 1948 United States presidential election. North Carolina voters chose 14 representatives, or electors, to the Electoral College, who voted for president and vice president.

As a former Confederate state, North Carolina had a history of Jim Crow laws, disfranchisement of its African-American population and dominance of the Democratic Party in state politics. However, unlike the Deep South, the Republican Party had sufficient historic Unionist white support from the mountains and northwestern Piedmont to gain one-third of the statewide vote total in most general elections, where turnout was higher than elsewhere in the former Confederacy due substantially to the state's early abolition of the poll tax in 1920. Like Virginia, Tennessee and Oklahoma, the relative strength of Republican opposition meant that North Carolina did not have statewide white primaries, although certain counties did use the white primary. Consequently, local response to the landmark 1944 court case of Smith v. Allwright was generally calm.

Nevertheless, the state was highly dissatisfied with the influence of blacks and labor unions on the national Democratic Party, and was initially satisfied when liberal Vice-president Henry A. Wallace was replaced on the Democratic ticket in 1944. However, by the beginning of 1946 most white North Carolinians were disapproving of President Truman, primarily because he appointed the first black federal judge and made overtures – though symbolic – toward civil rights. When Truman actually developed a proposal for black civil rights titled To Secure These Rights, however, North Carolina was the only Southern state where there was relatively little overt anger, and the state provided the only three votes from the former Confederacy for Truman as Democratic nominee during the party's 1948 National Convention. Combined with the persistent local Republican threat from mountain Unionist descendants, this meant that there was never any question of the state Democratic Party supporting South Carolina Governor Strom Thurmond.

Thurmond won 9% of white voters.

== Polls ==
Source	Ranking	As of
Chattanooga Daily Times	Likely D	October 15, 1948
The Montgomery Advertiser	Safe D	October 24, 1948
The Miami News	Safe D	October 25, 1948
The Charlotte Observer	Likely D	October 27, 1948
Mount Vernon Argus	Lean D	November 1, 1948
Oakland Tribune	Safe D	November 1, 1948

== Results ==
1948 United States presidential election in North Carolina
Party	Candidate	Votes	%
Democratic	Harry S. Truman (inc.)	459,070	58.02%
Republican	Thomas E. Dewey	258,572	32.68%
States’ Rights	Strom Thurmond	69,652	8.80%
Progressive	Henry A. Wallace	3,915	0.49%
Total votes		791,209	100%

=== Results by county ===
1948 United States presidential election in North Carolina by county
County	Harry S. Truman Democratic		Thomas Edmund Dewey Republican		James Strom Thurmond States’ Rights		Henry Agard Wallace Progressive		Margin	
County	%	#	%	#	%	#	%	#	%	#
Greene	96.45%	2,687	2.33%	65	1.18%	33	0.04%	1	94.11%	2,622
Bertie	95.71%	3,034	2.68%	85	1.48%	47	0.13%	4	93.03%	2,949
Martin	95.53%	4,636	3.36%	163	1.07%	52	0.04%	2	92.17%	4,473
Northampton	92.17%	3,591	4.59%	179	3.05%	119	0.18%	7	87.58%	3,412
Franklin	91.55%	4,538	4.72%	234	3.57%	177	0.16%	8	86.83%	4,304
Pitt	89.47%	8,519	6.32%	602	3.40%	324	0.81%	77	83.14%	7,917
Edgecombe	89.75%	6,410	6.69%	478	3.00%	214	0.56%	40	83.06%	5,932
Hertford	88.80%	2,165	8.04%	196	2.67%	65	0.49%	12	80.76%	1,969
Nash	88.50%	7,590	7.98%	684	3.38%	290	0.14%	12	80.53%	6,906
Lenoir	88.54%	5,445	8.37%	515	2.63%	162	0.46%	28	80.16%	4,930
Jones	88.05%	1,238	8.04%	113	3.70%	52	0.21%	3	80.01%	1,125
Halifax	86.82%	6,172	7.10%	505	5.95%	423	0.13%	9	79.72%	5,667
Onslow	87.34%	3,318	8.32%	316	4.32%	164	0.03%	1	79.02%	3,002
Warren	85.75%	2,376	6.93%	192	7.25%	201	0.07%	2	78.49% (Note: In this county where Thurmond ran second ahead of Dewey, margin given is Truman vote minus Thurmond vote and percentage margin Truman percentage minus Thurmond percentage.)	2,175
Gates	86.94%	939	8.24%	89	4.63%	50	0.19%	2	78.70%	850
Granville	85.25%	3,513	8.10%	334	6.16%	254	0.49%	20	77.14%	3,179
Wilson	86.25%	6,008	9.55%	665	3.57%	249	0.63%	44	76.70%	5,343
Chowan	83.99%	1,070	9.73%	124	5.65%	72	0.63%	8	74.25%	946
Currituck	83.63%	1,144	9.50%	130	6.36%	87	0.51%	7	74.12%	1,014
Hoke	80.71%	1,339	8.56%	142	10.61%	176	0.12%	2	70.10%	1,163
Person	82.28%	3,087	12.79%	480	4.80%	180	0.13%	5	69.48%	2,607
Craven	80.26%	5,039	11.87%	745	7.66%	481	0.21%	13	68.40%	4,294
Vance	79.51%	3,679	11.87%	549	8.06%	373	0.56%	26	67.65%	3,130
Perquimans	80.09%	849	12.74%	135	6.98%	74	0.19%	2	67.36%	714
Duplin	81.25%	5,866	14.18%	1,024	4.47%	323	0.10%	7	67.06%	4,842
Robeson	77.26%	7,056	11.34%	1,036	10.79%	985	0.61%	56	65.91%	6,020
Washington	81.43%	1,675	16.19%	333	1.70%	35	0.68%	14	65.24%	1,342
Anson	72.54%	2,692	12.05%	447	15.20%	564	0.22%	8	57.34%	2,128
Beaufort	77.53%	4,675	17.50%	1,055	4.89%	295	0.08%	5	60.03%	3,620
Columbus	74.79%	5,511	15.00%	1,105	10.06%	741	0.16%	12	59.79%	4,406
Bladen	72.33%	2,831	12.77%	500	14.67%	574	0.23%	9	57.66%	2,257
Richmond	71.95%	4,376	14.24%	866	13.58%	826	0.23%	14	57.71%	3,510
Camden	73.94%	576	16.30%	127	9.11%	71	0.64%	5	57.64%	449
Scotland	69.42%	1,957	12.74%	359	17.45%	492	0.39%	11	51.97%	1,465
Hyde	76.05%	800	20.34%	214	3.61%	38	0.00%	0	55.70%	586
Lee	74.38%	3,234	20.03%	871	5.47%	238	0.11%	5	54.35%	2,363
Caswell	68.82%	1,651	14.63%	351	16.22%	389	0.33%	8	52.61%	1,262
Wake (Note: In this county there were two write-in votes for national Socialist Party of America candidate Norman Thomas.)	73.45%	17,939	19.86%	4,850	5.90%	1,441	0.79%	193	53.59%	13,089
Wayne	73.20%	6,111	19.86%	1,658	6.62%	553	0.31%	26	53.34%	4,453
Union	66.23%	3,407	14.35%	738	19.23%	989	0.19%	10	47.01%	2,418
Harnett	74.11%	6,608	22.26%	1,985	3.50%	312	0.12%	11	51.85%	4,623
Pender	62.39%	1,334	14.22%	304	21.94%	469	1.45%	31	40.46%	865
Johnston	70.69%	9,188	24.71%	3,211	4.39%	571	0.21%	27	45.99%	5,977
Haywood	71.82%	7,373	26.14%	2,684	1.97%	202	0.07%	7	45.68%	4,689
Rockingham	68.89%	8,553	23.65%	2,936	7.24%	899	0.22%	27	45.24%	5,617
Cleveland	65.21%	6,039	20.57%	1,905	13.77%	1,275	0.45%	42	44.64%	4,134
Pasquotank	67.76%	1,976	24.04%	701	7.72%	225	0.48%	14	43.72%	1,275
Durham (Note: In this county there was one write-in vote for national Socialist candidate Norman Thomas and two votes for other write-in candidates.)	65.45%	11,530	25.72%	4,531	5.61%	989	3.20%	563	39.73%	6,999
Carteret	67.66%	3,491	29.46%	1,520	2.60%	134	0.29%	15	38.20%	1,971
Cumberland	55.13%	4,996	19.21%	1,741	25.26%	2,289	0.40%	36	29.87%	2,707
Tyrrell	65.77%	732	30.19%	336	3.86%	43	0.18%	2	35.58%	396
Dare	66.06%	802	30.72%	373	3.05%	37	0.16%	2	35.34%	429
Pamlico	62.36%	1,370	31.18%	685	6.14%	135	0.32%	7	31.18%	685
Orange	60.29%	3,523	31.03%	1,813	6.20%	362	2.48%	145	29.27%	1,710
Chatham	58.60%	3,396	34.65%	2,008	6.59%	382	0.16%	9	23.95%	1,388
Jackson	59.55%	4,005	37.47%	2,520	2.74%	184	0.24%	16	22.08%	1,485
Alamance	53.88%	8,287	33.32%	5,124	12.61%	1,939	0.20%	30	20.57%	3,163
Yancey	59.69%	3,481	39.13%	2,282	1.13%	66	0.05%	3	20.56%	1,199
New Hanover	47.92%	5,364	28.25%	3,162	23.24%	2,601	0.59%	66	19.67%	2,202
Surry	56.77%	6,956	37.89%	4,643	5.13%	629	0.20%	25	18.88%	2,313
Buncombe	55.34%	17,072	37.15%	11,460	6.94%	2,140	0.58%	179	18.19%	5,612
Swain	56.67%	1,908	41.25%	1,389	1.96%	66	0.12%	4	15.41%	519
McDowell	53.20%	3,805	37.88%	2,709	8.63%	617	0.29%	21	15.32%	1,096
Graham	56.24%	1,527	41.07%	1,115	2.43%	66	0.26%	7	15.17%	412
Gaston (Note: In this county there was one write-in vote for Socialist candidate Norman Thomas.)	47.27%	8,966	32.58%	6,180	19.80%	3,755	0.35%	67	14.69%	2,786
Stokes	56.15%	4,431	41.71%	3,291	1.96%	155	0.18%	14	14.45%	1,140
Rutherford	51.00%	5,992	36.95%	4,342	11.86%	1,394	0.19%	22	14.04%	1,650
Polk	52.07%	2,078	40.99%	1,636	6.82%	272	0.13%	5	11.07%	442
Iredell	47.47%	5,761	36.59%	4,441	15.76%	1,913	0.17%	21	10.88%	1,320
Moore	51.80%	3,341	42.16%	2,719	5.81%	375	0.23%	15	9.64%	622
Alleghany	51.43%	1,667	42.39%	1,374	5.86%	190	0.31%	10	9.04%	293
Guilford	48.73%	17,224	40.08%	14,167	10.06%	3,557	1.13%	401	8.65%	3,057
Mecklenburg (Note: In this county there were four write-in votes for national Socialist candidate Norman Thomas and five votes for other write-in candidates.)	43.24%	14,353	34.70%	11,518	21.61%	7,172	0.43%	142	8.54%	2,835
Forsyth	49.35%	12,201	41.04%	10,147	6.79%	1,679	2.82%	698	8.31%	2,054
Macon	52.46%	2,785	44.98%	2,388	2.45%	130	0.11%	6	7.48%	397
Rowan	43.30%	6,799	36.44%	5,722	20.04%	3,146	0.22%	35	6.86%	1,077
Cabarrus	39.44%	5,059	33.48%	4,294	26.80%	3,437	0.28%	36	5.96%	765
Montgomery	47.50%	2,165	43.33%	1,975	9.10%	415	0.07%	3	4.17%	190
Ashe	50.76%	4,633	46.74%	4,266	2.39%	218	0.11%	10	4.02%	367
Clay	50.76%	1,307	47.11%	1,213	1.90%	49	0.23%	6	3.65%	94
Brunswick	43.82%	2,052	40.49%	1,896	15.27%	715	0.43%	20	3.33%	156
Cherokee	49.73%	2,771	46.93%	2,615	2.98%	166	0.36%	20	2.80%	156
Transylvania	48.27%	2,975	46.42%	2,861	5.05%	311	0.26%	16	1.85%	114
Caldwell	46.67%	5,033	46.24%	4,987	6.89%	743	0.20%	22	0.43%	46
Sampson	47.07%	4,965	46.76%	4,932	5.75%	607	0.42%	44	0.31%	33
Lincoln	42.71%	3,570	43.49%	3,635	13.58%	1,135	0.22%	18	-0.78%	-65
Burke	46.16%	6,226	47.26%	6,374	6.47%	872	0.12%	16	-1.10%	-148
Catawba	44.36%	8,844	47.50%	9,471	7.90%	1,576	0.23%	46	-3.14%	-627
Davidson	46.15%	7,991	49.32%	8,539	4.33%	750	0.20%	34	-3.17%	-548
Alexander	42.65%	2,057	47.98%	2,314	9.10%	439	0.27%	13	-5.33%	-257
Watauga	45.66%	3,379	52.04%	3,851	2.14%	158	0.16%	12	-6.38%	-472
Randolph	41.88%	6,567	53.39%	8,372	4.62%	724	0.12%	19	-11.51%	-1,805
Stanly	37.82%	4,415	50.56%	5,902	11.39%	1,330	0.23%	27	-12.74%	-1,487
Madison	42.67%	2,558	55.73%	3,341	1.32%	79	0.28%	17	-13.06%	-783
Davie	38.66%	1,917	54.02%	2,679	7.10%	352	0.22%	11	-15.37%	-762
Wilkes	40.17%	5,784	57.18%	8,234	2.50%	360	0.15%	22	-17.01%	-2,450
Henderson	34.38%	3,311	51.61%	4,971	13.69%	1,319	0.32%	31	-17.23%	-1,660
Yadkin	35.10%	2,083	61.19%	3,631	3.51%	208	0.20%	12	-26.09%	-1,548
Avery	23.28%	933	74.73%	2,995	1.77%	71	0.22%	9	-51.45%	-2,062
Mitchell	21.48%	818	76.35%	2,908	1.97%	75	0.21%	8	-54.87%	-2,090

==== Counties that flipped from Democratic to Republican ====
- Lincoln
- Burke
- Catawba
- Davidson
- Henderson

==== Counties that flipped from Republican to Democratic ====
- Sampson

== Analysis ==
North Carolina was won by incumbent President Harry S. Truman (D–Missouri), running with Senator Alben W. Barkley, with 58.02 percent of the popular vote, against Governor Thomas E. Dewey (R–New York), running with Governor Earl Warren, with 32.68 percent of the popular vote. North Carolina was the worst former Confederate state for Thurmond, and one of only two, the other being Texas, in which he did not win at least one county. Because the Black Belt of the state, unlike the economically conservative Black Belts of the Deep South, was economically more liberal than the Piedmont region where the establishment Democratic faction led since 1929 by O. Max Gardner was based, its entirely white electorate stayed exceedingly loyal to Truman. The greatest support for Thurmond was instead found in middle- and upper-class urban areas of the Piedmont, to such an extent that the best Dixiecrat counties correlated strongly with the largest urban areas.

As of the 2020 presidential election, this is the last election in which Cabarrus County voted for a Democratic presidential candidate. This is also the last time a Democratic candidate won North Carolina by at least 15 points.

== See also ==
- United States presidential elections in North Carolina

== Works cited ==
- Black, Earl; Black, Merle (1992). The Vital South: How Presidents Are Elected. Harvard University Press. ISBN 0674941306.
