= 1928 United States presidential election in North Carolina =

- November 6, 1928

| Nominee | Herbert Hoover | Al Smith |
| Party | Republican | Democratic |
| Home state | California | New York |
| Running mate | Charles Curtis | Joseph T. Robinson |
| Electoral vote | 12 | 0 |
| Popular vote | 348,923 | 286,227 |
| Percentage | 54.94% | 45.06% |
County results
Hoover
50–60%
60–70%
70–80%
80–90%
Smith
50–60%
60–70%
70–80%
80–90%
President before election
Calvin Coolidge
Republican
Elected President
Herbert Hoover
Republican

The 1928 United States presidential election in North Carolina was held on November 6, 1928. North Carolina voters chose twelve electors to the Electoral College, who voted for president and vice president.

As a former Confederate state, North Carolina had a history of Jim Crow laws, disfranchisement of its African-American population and dominance of the Democratic Party in state politics. However, unlike the Deep South, the Republican Party had sufficient historic Unionist White support from the mountains and northwestern Piedmont to gain a stable one-third of the statewide vote total in most general elections, where turnout was higher than elsewhere in the former Confederacy due substantially to the state's early abolition of the poll tax in 1920. A rapid move following disenfranchisement to a completely "lily-white" state GOP also helped maintain Republican support amongst the state's voters. Like Virginia, Tennessee and Oklahoma, the relative strength of Republican opposition meant that North Carolina did not have statewide White primaries, although certain counties did use the White primary.

At the beginning of October, polls were suggesting that despite the divide in the state's Democrats, Smith would carry the state, and he visited Raleigh in mid-October. This prediction of a Smith victory despite Protestant opposition to his Catholicism and his anti-Prohibition views seemed confirmed in the days before the poll. However, with late counting, it became apparent that Smith had lost the state alongside Virginia, Florida and Texas.

Hoover's victory was due to a combination of anti-Catholicism – at its strongest in the fishing communities of the Outer Banks, where he carried several counties that had gone to John W. Davis in 1924 by four- or five-to-one margins – with increasing middle-class Republican voting in such cities as Charlotte, Durham and Greensboro. Although the state's Black Belt remained extremely loyal to Smith, this was not enough to come close to holding the state against traditional Appalachian Republicanism alongside urban and Outer Banks trends against him. Overall, Hoover won North Carolina by 9.88 percent, which made it his second-best state in the former Confederacy after Florida, and the only occasion between 1876 and 1964 in which North Carolina would vote Republican. The state would subsequently vote solidly Democratic until Richard Nixon won it in 1968.

As of the 2024 presidential election, this is the last election in which Orange County voted for a Republican presidential candidate.

== Results ==
1928 United States presidential election in North Carolina
| Party | Candidate | Votes | % |
|---|---|---|---|
| Republican | Herbert Hoover | 348,923 | 54.94% |
| Democratic | Al Smith | 286,227 | 45.06% |
| Total votes | | 635,150 | 100.00% |

=== Results by county ===
1928 United States presidential election in North Carolina by county
| County | Herbert Clark Hoover Republican | | Alfred Emmanuel Smith Democratic | | Margin | |
| County | % | # | % | # | % | # |
|---|---|---|---|---|---|---|
| Avery | 89.35% | 3,273 | 10.65% | 390 | 78.71% | 2,883 |
| Yadkin | 83.60% | 3,878 | 16.40% | 761 | 67.19% | 3,117 |
| Madison | 81.38% | 4,776 | 18.62% | 1,093 | 62.75% | 3,683 |
| Mitchell | 80.60% | 3,436 | 19.40% | 827 | 61.20% | 2,609 |
| Wilkes | 73.59% | 7,808 | 26.41% | 2,802 | 47.18% | 5,006 |
| Davie | 73.17% | 2,959 | 26.83% | 1,085 | 46.34% | 1,874 |
| Sampson | 70.94% | 5,579 | 29.06% | 2,285 | 41.89% | 3,294 |
| Forsyth | 66.63% | 13,258 | 33.37% | 6,639 | 33.27% | 6,619 |
| Durham | 66.06% | 8,723 | 33.94% | 4,482 | 32.12% | 4,241 |
| Surry | 65.79% | 7,015 | 34.21% | 3,647 | 31.59% | 3,368 |
| Stokes | 65.61% | 3,759 | 34.39% | 1,970 | 31.23% | 1,789 |
| Brunswick | 65.48% | 1,931 | 34.52% | 1,018 | 30.96% | 913 |
| Caldwell | 64.74% | 4,207 | 35.26% | 2,291 | 29.49% | 1,916 |
| Burke | 63.94% | 5,108 | 36.06% | 2,881 | 27.88% | 2,227 |
| Randolph | 63.90% | 7,414 | 36.10% | 4,188 | 27.81% | 3,226 |
| Davidson | 63.19% | 8,960 | 36.81% | 5,220 | 26.38% | 3,740 |
| Cherokee | 62.89% | 3,239 | 37.11% | 1,911 | 25.79% | 1,328 |
| Guilford | 62.62% | 16,541 | 37.38% | 9,872 | 25.25% | 6,669 |
| Rowan | 62.46% | 7,957 | 37.54% | 4,783 | 24.91% | 3,174 |
| Henderson | 62.33% | 5,210 | 37.67% | 3,149 | 24.66% | 2,061 |
| Rockingham | 62.08% | 5,585 | 37.92% | 3,411 | 24.17% | 2,174 |
| Alamance | 61.52% | 6,810 | 38.48% | 4,260 | 23.04% | 2,550 |
| New Hanover | 60.62% | 4,248 | 39.38% | 2,760 | 21.23% | 1,488 |
| Catawba | 60.58% | 7,556 | 39.42% | 4,916 | 21.17% | 2,640 |
| Stanly | 60.51% | 4,597 | 39.49% | 3,000 | 21.02% | 1,597 |
| Carteret | 60.51% | 3,133 | 39.49% | 2,045 | 21.01% | 1,088 |
| Johnston | 60.42% | 7,696 | 39.58% | 5,041 | 20.84% | 2,655 |
| Alexander | 60.20% | 2,605 | 39.80% | 1,722 | 20.41% | 883 |
| Gaston | 59.14% | 9,702 | 40.86% | 6,702 | 18.29% | 3,000 |
| Swain | 59.04% | 2,484 | 40.96% | 1,723 | 18.09% | 761 |
| Orange | 58.77% | 2,564 | 41.23% | 1,799 | 17.53% | 765 |
| Rutherford | 58.16% | 5,762 | 41.84% | 4,146 | 16.31% | 1,616 |
| Iredell | 58.12% | 6,712 | 41.88% | 4,836 | 16.25% | 1,876 |
| Jones | 57.52% | 658 | 42.48% | 486 | 15.03% | 172 |
| Lincoln | 57.43% | 3,930 | 42.57% | 2,913 | 14.86% | 1,017 |
| Cabarrus | 57.35% | 6,548 | 42.65% | 4,869 | 14.71% | 1,679 |
| Buncombe | 57.22% | 16,590 | 42.78% | 12,405 | 14.43% | 4,185 |
| Harnett | 57.15% | 4,740 | 42.85% | 3,554 | 14.30% | 1,186 |
| Macon | 56.99% | 2,903 | 43.01% | 2,191 | 13.98% | 712 |
| Washington | 56.85% | 1,183 | 43.15% | 898 | 13.70% | 285 |
| Montgomery | 56.82% | 2,653 | 43.18% | 2,016 | 13.64% | 637 |
| Graham | 56.68% | 1,260 | 43.32% | 963 | 13.36% | 297 |
| Pender | 56.57% | 1,300 | 43.43% | 998 | 13.14% | 302 |
| Transylvania | 55.70% | 2,165 | 44.30% | 1,722 | 11.40% | 443 |
| Ashe | 55.64% | 4,337 | 44.36% | 3,458 | 11.28% | 879 |
| Pamlico | 55.59% | 1,099 | 44.41% | 878 | 11.18% | 221 |
| Moore | 55.49% | 3,290 | 44.51% | 2,639 | 10.98% | 651 |
| Mecklenburg | 55.41% | 12,041 | 44.59% | 9,690 | 10.82% | 2,351 |
| Chatham | 55.32% | 3,318 | 44.68% | 2,680 | 10.64% | 638 |
| Columbus | 55.32% | 3,533 | 44.68% | 2,854 | 10.63% | 679 |
| Bladen | 55.18% | 1,911 | 44.82% | 1,552 | 10.37% | 359 |
| Clay | 55.05% | 1,106 | 44.95% | 903 | 10.10% | 203 |
| Watauga | 54.94% | 3,159 | 45.06% | 2,591 | 9.88% | 568 |
| Onslow | 53.89% | 1,253 | 46.11% | 1,072 | 7.78% | 181 |
| Wayne | 53.85% | 4,340 | 46.15% | 3,720 | 7.69% | 620 |
| Polk | 53.68% | 1,873 | 46.32% | 1,616 | 7.37% | 257 |
| Hyde | 53.62% | 682 | 46.38% | 590 | 7.23% | 92 |
| Jackson | 52.55% | 3,512 | 47.45% | 3,171 | 5.10% | 341 |
| Duplin | 52.37% | 2,911 | 47.63% | 2,647 | 4.75% | 264 |
| Yancey | 52.27% | 2,712 | 47.73% | 2,476 | 4.55% | 236 |
| Cumberland | 51.73% | 3,534 | 48.27% | 3,297 | 3.47% | 237 |
| Haywood | 51.73% | 4,472 | 48.27% | 4,173 | 3.46% | 299 |
| Tyrrell | 51.53% | 505 | 48.47% | 475 | 3.06% | 30 |
| McDowell | 49.95% | 3,423 | 50.05% | 3,430 | -0.10% | -7 |
| Perquimans | 49.63% | 600 | 50.37% | 609 | -0.74% | -9 |
| Gates | 49.38% | 558 | 50.62% | 572 | -1.24% | -14 |
| Cleveland | 49.24% | 4,766 | 50.76% | 4,914 | -1.53% | -148 |
| Alleghany | 49.17% | 1,368 | 50.83% | 1,414 | -1.65% | -46 |
| Dare | 47.97% | 814 | 52.03% | 883 | -4.07% | -69 |
| Person | 47.63% | 1,123 | 52.37% | 1,235 | -4.75% | -112 |
| Craven | 47.28% | 2,237 | 52.72% | 2,494 | -5.43% | -257 |
| Union | 46.29% | 2,448 | 53.71% | 2,840 | -7.41% | -392 |
| Lee | 45.23% | 1,416 | 54.77% | 1,715 | -9.55% | -299 |
| Caswell | 44.45% | 749 | 55.55% | 936 | -11.10% | -187 |
| Wake | 41.84% | 6,720 | 58.16% | 9,341 | -16.32% | -2,621 |
| Beaufort | 41.64% | 2,521 | 58.36% | 3,533 | -16.72% | -1,012 |
| Richmond | 40.74% | 2,045 | 59.26% | 2,975 | -18.53% | -930 |
| Vance | 37.70% | 1,449 | 62.30% | 2,395 | -24.61% | -946 |
| Robeson | 36.91% | 2,767 | 63.09% | 4,730 | -26.18% | -1,963 |
| Lenoir | 35.68% | 1,311 | 64.32% | 2,363 | -28.63% | -1,052 |
| Wilson | 35.35% | 1,933 | 64.65% | 3,535 | -29.30% | -1,602 |
| Nash | 32.72% | 2,066 | 67.28% | 4,249 | -34.57% | -2,183 |
| Greene | 31.46% | 542 | 68.54% | 1,181 | -37.09% | -639 |
| Pasquotank | 29.52% | 814 | 70.48% | 1,943 | -40.95% | -1,129 |
| Camden | 28.19% | 245 | 71.81% | 624 | -43.61% | -379 |
| Hertford | 27.62% | 393 | 72.38% | 1,030 | -44.76% | -637 |
| Chowan | 27.33% | 352 | 72.67% | 936 | -45.34% | -584 |
| Scotland | 25.03% | 588 | 74.97% | 1,761 | -49.94% | -1,173 |
| Pitt | 23.09% | 1,395 | 76.91% | 4,646 | -53.82% | -3,251 |
| Granville | 22.46% | 858 | 77.54% | 2,962 | -55.08% | -2,104 |
| Hoke | 21.23% | 311 | 78.77% | 1,154 | -57.54% | -843 |
| Northampton | 20.93% | 456 | 79.07% | 1,723 | -58.15% | -1,267 |
| Franklin | 20.48% | 729 | 79.52% | 2,831 | -59.04% | -2,102 |
| Anson | 19.77% | 726 | 80.23% | 2,947 | -60.47% | -2,221 |
| Edgecombe | 18.93% | 977 | 81.07% | 4,184 | -62.14% | -3,207 |
| Bertie | 15.75% | 374 | 84.25% | 2,000 | -68.49% | -1,626 |
| Warren | 15.69% | 379 | 84.31% | 2,037 | -68.63% | -1,658 |
| Halifax | 15.42% | 890 | 84.58% | 4,882 | -69.16% | -3,992 |
| Martin | 12.73% | 411 | 87.27% | 2,818 | -74.54% | -2,407 |
| Currituck | 11.70% | 166 | 88.30% | 1,253 | -76.60% | -1,087 |

== Analysis ==
With all other prominent Democrats sitting the election out, the party nominated Alfred E. Smith, four-term Governor of New York as its nominee for 1928, with little opposition. The response in the South was one of anger, because Smith was a devout Catholic, opposed to Prohibition, linked with New York City's Tammany Hall political machine, and the son of Irish and Italian immigrants. Whilst it is generally thought that the South would have accepted a man possessing one of those characteristics, the combination proved a bitter dose for many of North Carolina's loyal Democrats. Bishop James M. Cannon summoned a meeting of church leaders in Asheville on July 18 to

organize for the "defeat of the wet Tammany candidate for president"

At this Asheville assembly Bishop Horace DuBose said that Smith's candidacy posed

the greatest moral crisis in the nation's history and perhaps in the history of mankind.

The loyalties of the state Democratic Party – less factionalized than other southern parties because of the consistent Republican opposition – became further strained when long-serving Senator Furnifold McLendel Simmons refused to support the New York Governor. He argued firstly that Smith's nomination would be extremely dangerous because it would produce a "vexatious" campaign unreasonably focused on religion and Prohibition, and secondly that Smith's followers wanted to eliminate him. With the aid of Frank R. McNich and church leaders, Simmons created the "Anti-Smith Democrats", who became opposed by other leading Democrats such as Josiah W. Bailey (who would unseat Simmons from his Senate seat) and Josephus Daniels. The state's press was equally split over Smith, with The Charlotte Observer and Charlotte News especially unwilling to endorse him against Republican nominee, Secretary of Commerce Herbert Hoover.
