= List of United States tornadoes from October to November 2021 =

List of tornadoes in the United States

United States tornadoes from October to November 2021
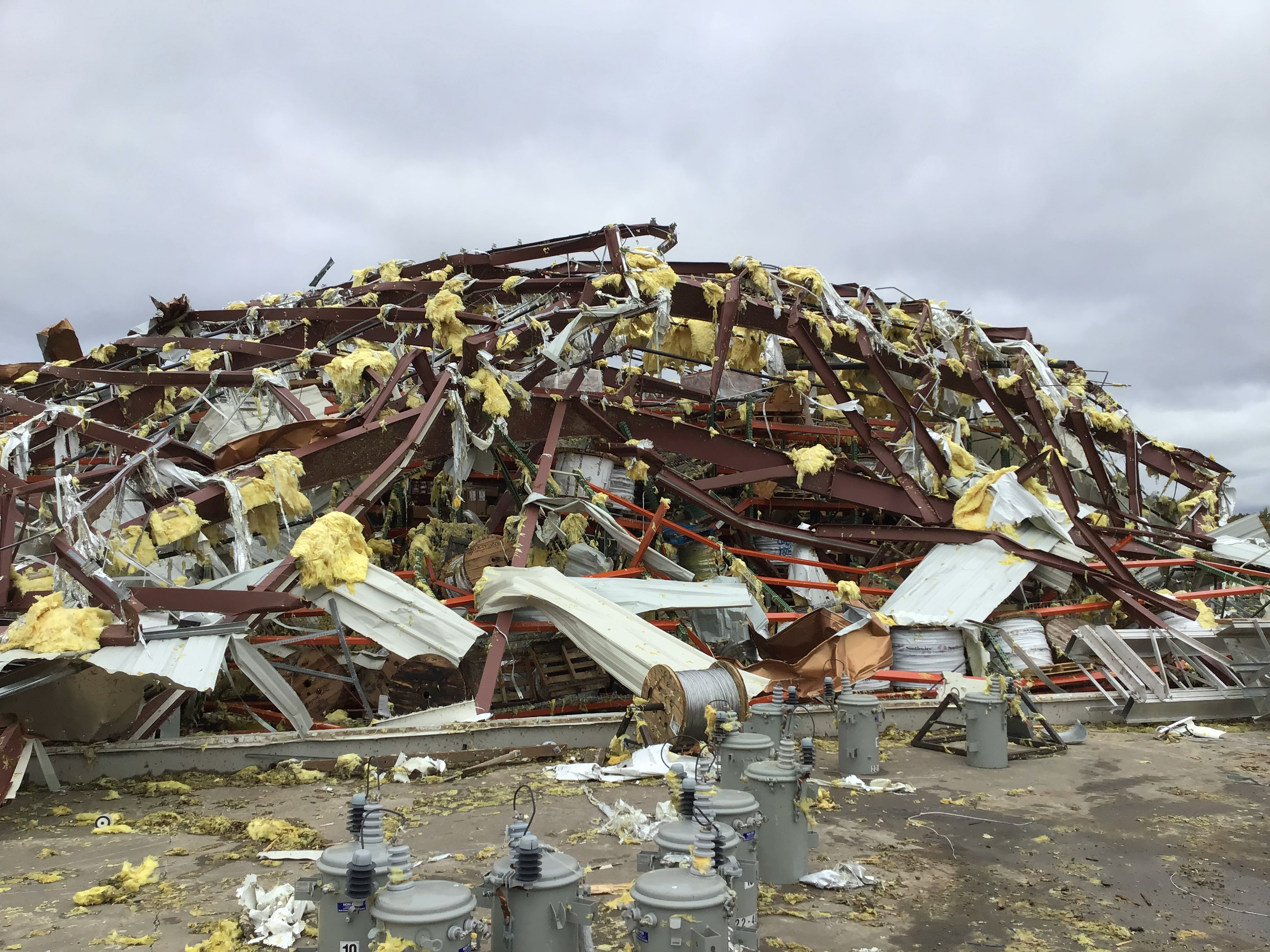
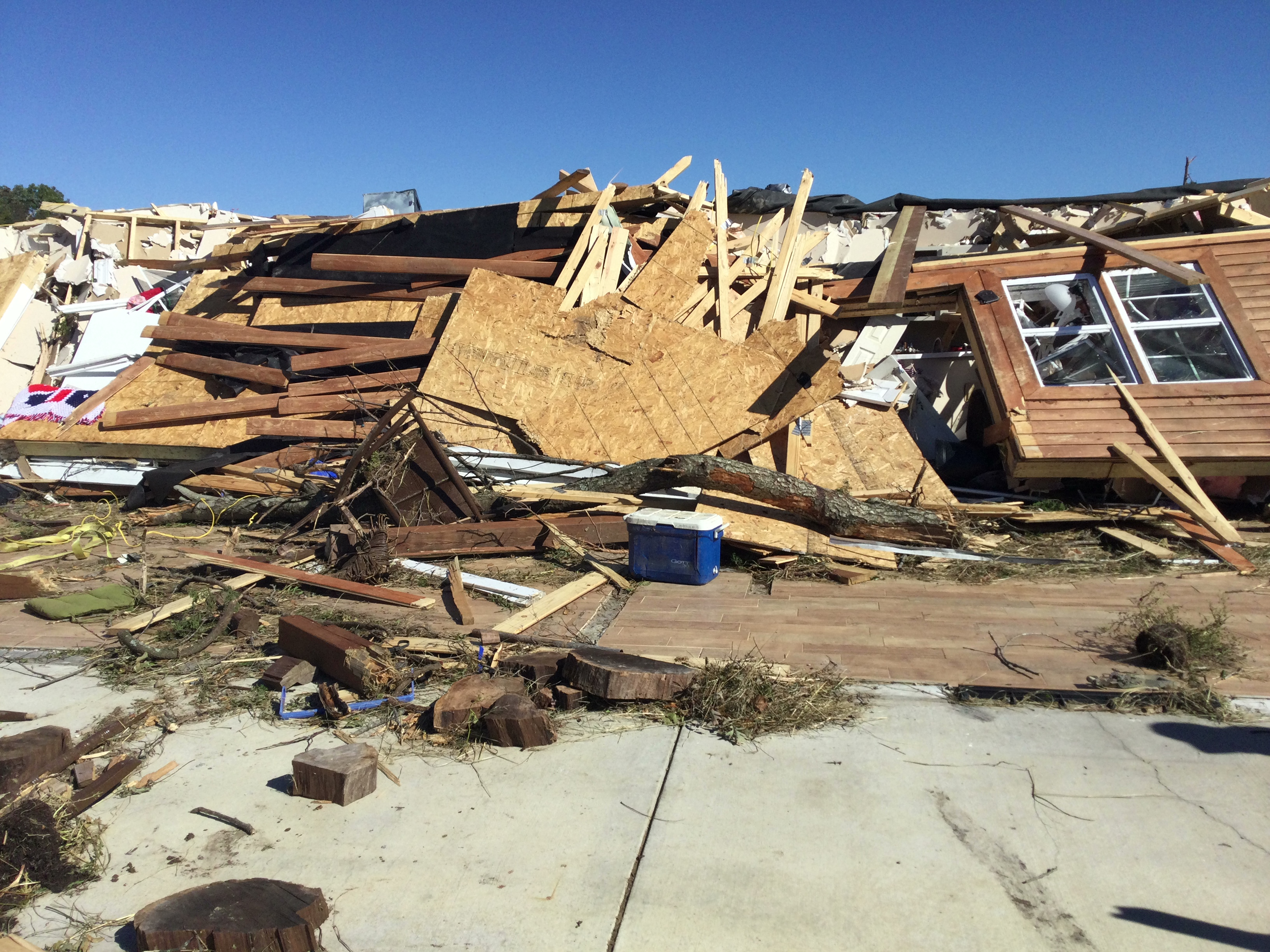
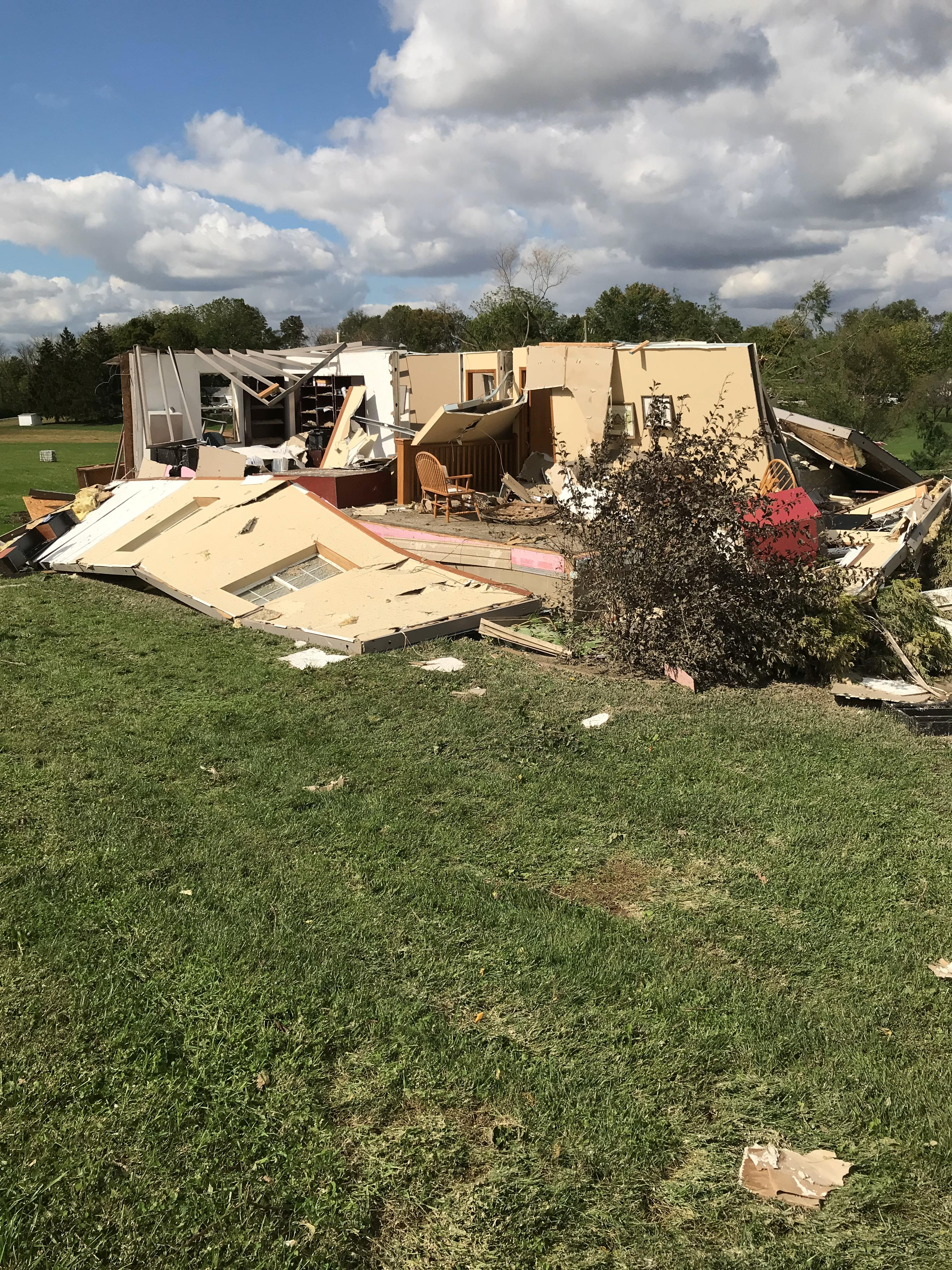
- Clockwise from top: EF3 tornado damage to a metal building in Catherine Place, Missouri on October 24; A home South Salem, Ohio damaged after a short-lived EF2 tornado on October 16; A home after an EF3 tornado passed near Avon, Missouri on October 24.
- Timespan: October 3 – November 13
- Maximum rated tornado: EF3 tornado: Coffman, Missouri on October 24; Catherine Place, Missouri on October 24
- Tornadoes: 172
- Fatalities: 1
- Injuries: 7

This page documents all tornadoes confirmed by various weather forecast offices of the National Weather Service in the United States from October to November 2021. On average, there are 61 confirmed tornadoes in the United States in October, but steady activity throughout the month, plus several smaller outbreaks, pushed the total to a new monthly record of 151 despite the lack of any major tornado outbreaks. By contrast, November saw only 21 tornadoes, all of which occurred during a four-day period in the middle of the month and all were weak. This was well below the average of 58.

== United States yearly total ==
Confirmed tornadoes by Enhanced Fujita rating
EFU	EF0	EF1	EF2	EF3	EF4	EF5	Total
210	545	433	103	21	3	0	1,315

== October ==
Confirmed tornadoes by Enhanced Fujita rating
EFU	EF0	EF1	EF2	EF3	EF4	EF5	Total
20	60	59	10	2	0	0	151

=== October 3 event ===
List of confirmed tornadoes – Sunday, October 3, 2021 (Note: All dates are based on the local time zone where the tornado touched down; however, all times are in Coordinated Universal Time for consistency.)
EF#	Location	County / Parish	State	Start Coord.	Time (UTC)	Path length	Max width
EFU	ENE of New Carlisle	St. Joseph	IN	41.72°N 86.47°W	19:47–19:48	0.01 mi (0.016 km)	1 yd (0.91 m)
EFU	A landspout remained nearly stationary in an open field and lofted dust. No damage was reported.						
EFU	NW of Ashkum	Iroquois	IL	40.9199°N 88.028°W	20:26–20:27	0.1 mi (0.16 km)	30 yd (27 m)
EFU	A brief tornado touched down in a corn field. No damage was found.						
EF0	W of Mount Juliet	Wilson	TN	36.1625°N 86.5594°W	21:36–21:52	2.51 mi (4.04 km)	25 yd (23 m)
EF0	A weak tornado caught on video downed a few trees along an intermittent path that moved across Interstate 40.						
EF0	ESE of Holly	Oakland	MI	42.7826°N 83.5149°W	22:19–22:22	0.76 mi (1.22 km)	75 yd (69 m)
EF0	A brief tornado caused minor siding damage to two homes, broke numerous large tree limbs, and uprooted a few small trees.						

=== October 6 event ===
List of confirmed tornadoes – Wednesday, October 6, 2021
EF#	Location	County / Parish	State	Start Coord.	Time (UTC)	Path length	Max width
EF1	N of Crossville	Cumberland	TN	36.0135°N 85.0337°W	22:59–23:03	0.99 mi (1.59 km)	50 yd (46 m)
EF1	At least six homes and several outbuildings were damaged, with three homes and another under construction sustaining significant roof and exterior damage. Numerous trees were snapped or uprooted in all directions, and power lines were downed. This was the first known tornado to occur in the month of October in Cumberland County.						

=== October 9 event ===
List of confirmed tornadoes – Saturday, October 9, 2021
EF#	Location	County / Parish	State	Start Coord.	Time (UTC)	Path length	Max width
EF0	WSW of Brentford	Spink	SD	45.14°N 98.4°W	21:12–21:14	1.19 mi (1.92 km)	100 yd (91 m)
EF0	Twelve large hay bales were rolled, some over a fence.						
EF0	W of Langford	Marshall	SD	45.6°N 97.88°W	22:12	0.01 mi (0.016 km)	10 yd (9.1 m)
EF0	A tornado very briefly touched down.						
EF0	NW of Roslyn	Day	SD	45.52°N 97.52°W	22:31	0.01 mi (0.016 km)	10 yd (9.1 m)
EF0	A brief tornado was reported by the local fire department.						
EF0	SSE of Lidgerwood	Richland	ND	45.98°N 97.09°W	23:40–23:42	0.1 mi (0.16 km)	10 yd (9.1 m)
EF0	A trained spotter caught this tornado on video near Highway 18. The tornado remained over an open field.						
EF0	SW of Dumont	Traverse	MN	45.68°N 96.46°W	00:10–00:12	0.84 mi (1.35 km)	10 yd (9.1 m)
EF0	One farmstead had sheet metal tossed, an uprooted tree and downed tree branches. A pole barn at a second farmstead sustained damage to its roof and walls. Large tree branches were downed.						
EF0	WSW of Herman	Traverse	MN	45.76°N 96.29°W	00:21–00:23	1.6 mi (2.6 km)	10 yd (9.1 m)
EF0	This tornado damaged trees and outbuildings, including a grain bin which was lofted and rolled about 0.4 mi (0.64 km) to the northeast.						
EF1	Park Rapids	Hubbard	MN	46.90°N 95.06°W	03:35–03:38	0.21 mi (0.34 km)	25 yd (23 m)
EF1	Several large metal roof panels were torn off a church. Roof panels and siding were torn off a car dealership building. A road sign on US 71 was torn out of the ground and landed 50 yd (46 m) away. One power pole was snapped. Several mature spruce trees were uprooted.						

=== October 10 event ===
List of confirmed tornadoes – Sunday, October 10, 2021
EF#	Location	County / Parish	State	Start Coord.	Time (UTC)	Path length	Max width
EFU	SSW of Cooperton	Kiowa	OK	34.8165°N 98.897°W	22:59	0.1 mi (0.16 km)	20 yd (18 m)
EFU	Several storm chasers observed this tornado. No damage was found.						
EF2	East Cook, MN	Cook (MN), Thunder Bay (ON)	MN, ON	48.0440°N 90.2960°W	23:10–23:20	4.13 mi (6.65 km)	500 yd (460 m)
EF2	This tornado initially caused tree damage at a campground near Adler Lake. Sporadic tree damage continued as it moved north until it reached Rocky Lake where tree damage became more concentrated in an area roughly 270 yards (250 m) wide. Further north, significant tree damage was observed from north of Clearwater Lake to the United States/Canada international border. Tree damage continued just north of the international border before the tornado dissipated north of Mountain Lake.						
EF1	E of Cooperton	Kiowa	OK	34.885°N 98.725°W	23:13–23:18	2.89 mi (4.65 km)	200 yd (180 m)
EF1	This tornado was observed by several storm chasers, including an off-duty meteorologist from the Storm Prediction Center, before the tornado became wrapped in rain. A trailer was destroyed and trees were damaged.						
EF1	W of Boone	Caddo	OK	34.9°N 98.619°W	23:20–23:25	4.4 mi (7.1 km)	50 yd (46 m)
EF1	One home sustained significant roof damage. Several power poles were snapped. Trees were damaged.						
EF2	Anadarko	Caddo	OK	35.044°N 98.295°W	23:45–23:59	8.1 mi (13.0 km)	100 yd (91 m)
EF2	A hangar was damaged at the Anadarko airport south of town, and several other buildings were damaged in and around town. The most significant damage from this tornado occurred east of Anadarko, where the roof of a home was removed.						
EFU	SW of Verden	Caddo, Grady	OK	35.055°N 98.112°W	00:02–00:05	1.83 mi (2.95 km)	50 yd (46 m)
EFU	Storm chasers observed this tornado. No damage was found.						
EFU	NE of Chickasha	Grady	OK	35.105°N 97.931°W	00:16	0.2 mi (0.32 km)	50 yd (46 m)
EFU	A storm chaser observed a tornado. No damage was reported.						
EF0	N of Harrah	Oklahoma, Lincoln	OK	35.535°N 97.179°W	01:21–01:26	3.32 mi (5.34 km)	250 yd (230 m)
EF0	One mobile home sustained roof damage. Trees were damaged along the path.						
EF0	Western Warwick	Lincoln	OK	35.679°N 97.013°W	01:41–01:42	1.1 mi (1.8 km)	30 yd (27 m)
EF0	A barn was destroyed and trees were damaged in the western part of town.						
EF0	SW of Dale	Pottawatomie	OK	35.368°N 97.063°W	01:41–01:43	1.6 mi (2.6 km)	50 yd (46 m)
EF0	A service station canopy and trees were damaged just north of Interstate 40. A barn west of Dale was also damaged.						
EF0	Johnson	Pottawatomie	OK	35.396°N 96.867°W	01:54–01:58	1.6 mi (2.6 km)	50 yd (46 m)
EF0	Several trees were damaged in Johnson, including one that damaged a home.						
EF1	NNW of Paden	Okfuskee	OK	35.579°N 96.552°W	02:26–02:32	2.7 mi (4.3 km)	300 yd (270 m)
EF1	Several outbuildings were damaged. Trees were snapped or uprooted.						
EF1	W of Ada to E of Byng	Pontotoc	OK	34.78°N 96.723°W	02:26–02:36	7.31 mi (11.76 km)	300 yd (270 m)
EF1	Several barns and metal buildings were damaged. A few homes sustained roof, garage door, or patio damage. Trees were damaged along the path.						
EFU	SE of Gypsy	Creek	OK	35.6854°N 96.4099°W	02:42–02:43	1 mi (1.6 km)	100 yd (91 m)
EFU	A tornado debris signature appeared on radar in association with this tornado. However, no damage rating could be assigned as there were no roads accessing the area.						
EF0	E of Beggs	Okmulgee	OK	35.732°N 96.070°W	03:05–03:12	2.2 mi (3.5 km)	300 yd (270 m)
EF0	Several homes sustained roof damage, and large tree limbs were snapped.						
EFU	SSE of Bixby	Tulsa	OK	35.8596°N 95.8518°W	03:30–03:32	0.7 mi (1.1 km)	100 yd (91 m)
EFU	A tornado debris signature appeared on radar in association with this tornado. However, no damage rating could be assigned as there were no roads accessing the area.						
EF1	Coweta	Wagoner	OK	35.936°N 95.647°W	03:45–03:52	3.4 mi (5.5 km)	700 yd (640 m)
EF1	Homes and businesses in Coweta sustained minor to moderate damage, and some outbuildings were destroyed. Several buildings at Coweta High School were damaged, and trees and power poles were downed.						
EF1	ESE of Warner to NW of Paradise Hill	Muskogee, Sequoyah	OK	35.483°N 95.253°W	04:30–04:47	13.7 mi (22.0 km)	900 yd (820 m)
EF1	Homes were damaged, outbuildings were destroyed, trees were snapped or uprooted and power poles were blown down.						
EF1	SE of Eucha	Delaware	OK	36.302°N 94.834°W	05:10–05:18	5.9 mi (9.5 km)	200 yd (180 m)
EF1	Trees were snapped or uprooted along the path.						
EF0	E of Layneville	Barton	MO	37.48°N 94.09°W	05:55–06:01	2.26 mi (3.64 km)	50 yd (46 m)
EF0	Intermittent tree damage occurred along the path.						

=== October 11 event ===
List of confirmed tornadoes – Monday, October 11, 2021
EF#	Location	County / Parish	State	Start Coord.	Time (UTC)	Path length	Max width
EF1	SW of Neosho	Newton	MO	36.7894°N 94.4301°W	06:08–06:15	3.34 mi (5.38 km)	90 yd (82 m)
EF1	One manufactured home was blown off its foundation and a farm building sustained collapsed doors. Several trees were snapped or uprooted.						
EF0	SSW of Golden City	Jasper, Barton	MO	37.32°N 94.12°W	09:44–09:48	2.35 mi (3.78 km)	50 yd (46 m)
EF0	The roof of a barn was blown off and a center pivot irrigation system was overturned. Some trees were snapped or uprooted.						
EF2	Western Wrights	Greene	IL	39.3547°N 90.3002°W	19:37–19:45	5.83 mi (9.38 km)	75 yd (69 m)
EF2	This low-end EF2 tornado touched down along the western fringes of Wrights, where two new, well-built farm buildings were completely destroyed, with one being ripped from its foundation. Two more farm buildings were destroyed to the northeast. A camper was rolled onto a boat, and trees were snapped along the path as well.						
EF0	NW of Alexander	Morgan	IL	39.729°N 90.053°W	20:26–20:28	1.37 mi (2.20 km)	50 yd (46 m)
EF0	Large trees were damaged along the path. A semi-truck was blown over as the tornado crossed Interstate 72.						
EFU	N of Roanoke	Woodford	IL	40.835°N 89.203°W	21:28–21:30	0.26 mi (0.42 km)	30 yd (27 m)
EFU	A tornado briefly touched down in an open field, causing no damage.						
EF0	ESE of Washburn	Woodford, Marshall	IL	40.894°N 89.23°W	21:45–21:51	2.47 mi (3.98 km)	75 yd (69 m)
EF0	The roof and walls of a barn were damaged, and an outbuilding was also damaged. A couple of trees were damaged as well.						
EF0	SW of St. John, IN	Will (IL), Lake (IN)	IL, IN	41.4045°N 87.5291°W	22:10–22:13	1.56 mi (2.51 km)	70 yd (64 m)
EF0	There was minor damage to trees and a farm building. Fencing was blown down and at least one soccer net was overturned.						
EFU	W of El Paso	Woodford	IL	40.712°N 89.046°W	22:39–22:44	2.51 mi (4.04 km)	50 yd (46 m)
EFU	This tornado was observed by storm chasers. No damage was found.						
EFU	W of McNabb	Putnam	IL	41.18°N 89.31°W	22:47–22:48	0.02 mi (0.032 km)	10 yd (9.1 m)
EFU	A storm chaser reported a brief tornado. No damage was found.						
EFU	NE of Troy Grove	LaSalle	IL	41.4873°N 89.0287°W	23:30–23:31	0.4 mi (0.64 km)	40 yd (37 m)
EFU	A brief tornado occurred but caused no damage.						

=== October 12 event ===
List of confirmed tornadoes – Tuesday, October 12, 2021
EF#	Location	County / Parish	State	Start Coord.	Time (UTC)	Path length	Max width
EF0	NNW of Retrop	Beckham	OK	35.2092°N 99.3973°W	23:48	0.1 mi (0.16 km)	10 yd (9.1 m)
EF0	A storm chaser reported a brief tornado. No damage was found.						
EFU	S of Foss	Washita	OK	35.4166°N 99.17°W	00:24	0.1 mi (0.16 km)	25 yd (23 m)
EFU	A storm chaser photographed this tornado. No damage was found.						
EF0	S of Sharon Springs	Wallace	KS	38.8723°N 101.791°W	00:25–00:33	3.32 mi (5.34 km)	100 yd (91 m)
EF0	At the Sharon Springs Golf Course, several outbuildings were damaged, a power pole leaned over, and some tree limbs were snapped. A nearby combine had broken windows, and two wooden beams pierced the door of a tractor-trailer.						
EF0	SW of Frederick	Tillman	OK	34.3388°N 99.082°W	00:38	0.4 mi (0.64 km)	30 yd (27 m)
EF0	Several storm chasers, including an off-duty meteorologist from the Storm Prediction Center, observed this brief tornado. No damage was found.						
EF1	W of Frederick to ESE of Tipton	Tillman	OK	34.372°N 99.077°W	00:41–00:58	7.26 mi (11.68 km)	300 yd (270 m)
EF1	One barn sustained significant wall damage. A few pivot irrigation systems were tipped over. Trees and power poles were damaged along the path.						
EF1	Eastern Clinton to SSE of Custer City	Custer	OK	35.515°N 98.961°W	00:55–01:25	9.6 mi (15.4 km)	400 yd (370 m)
EF1	As the tornado developed on the eastern side of Clinton, it damaged a car body shop and a warehouse building. As it moved northeast, it damaged trees at a golf course. Several hangars were damaged or destroyed as the tornado struck Clinton Regional Airport. Farther northeast, a roof was blown off an outbuilding, a street sign was thrown 200 yd (180 m) and damaged trees.						
EFU	NE of Clinton	Custer	OK	35.5305°N 98.9449°W	01:01	0.2 mi (0.32 km)	20 yd (18 m)
EFU	This tornado was believed to be a satellite tornado to the previous EF1 tornado near Clinton. No damage was found.						
EF1	SE of Snyder	Tillman, Kiowa	OK	34.591°N 98.893°W	01:19–01:21	0.9 mi (1.4 km)	300 yd (270 m)
EF1	The roof of a barn and a few trees were damaged near the county line.						
EF1	ESE of Snyder to NW of Indiahoma	Kiowa, Comanche	OK	34.621°N 98.857°W	01:26–01:44	8.4 mi (13.5 km)	900 yd (820 m)
EF1	In Kiowa County, the tornado damaged trees and power poles. In Comanche County, the tornado damaged the roofs of one home and one mobile home. A barn door was blown in. Trees were damaged.						
EFU	W of Meers	Comanche	OK	34.778°N 98.685°W	02:00–02:07	2.6 mi (4.2 km)	50 yd (46 m)
EFU	A tornado debris signature appeared on radar in association with this tornado. However, no damage rating could be assigned as there were no roads accessing the area.						
EF1	SSE of Sublette to NW of Copeland	Haskell, Gray	KS	37.3983°N 100.802°W	02:23–02:37	13.5 mi (21.7 km)	150 yd (140 m)
EF1	Several pivot irrigation systems were flipped, and farm outbuildings were damaged.						
EFU	NW of Boone	Caddo	OK	34.9512°N 98.5224°W	02:35–02:36	0.5 mi (0.80 km)	30 yd (27 m)
EFU	A storm chaser photographed this tornado. No damage was found.						
EF1	S of Cimarron	Gray	KS	37.7074°N 100.3277°W	03:02–03:05	1.94 mi (3.12 km)	75 yd (69 m)
EF1	This brief tornado destroyed a pivot irrigation sprinkler.						
EF1	WNW of Dodge City	Ford	KS	37.7411°N 100.1814°W	03:12–03:22	7.14 mi (11.49 km)	75 yd (69 m)
EF1	This tornado mostly tracked over open fields, but damaged a farm outbuilding and destroyed a pivot irrigation system near the beginning of its path.						
EF1	NNW of Spearville to S of Hanston	Ford, Hodgeman	KS	37.888°N 99.7807°W	03:39–03:51	10.72 mi (17.25 km)	75 yd (69 m)
EF1	Several pivot irrigation systems were flipped, and farm outbuildings were damaged.						
EF1	E of Ford	Ford	KS	37.6303°N 99.6789°W	04:22–04:24	2.05 mi (3.30 km)	75 yd (69 m)
EF1	This brief tornado heavily damaged a pivot irrigation system and snapped large tree branches.						
EF1	ENE of Bucklin	Ford	KS	37.584°N 99.5728°W	04:38–04:39	0.89 mi (1.43 km)	50 yd (46 m)
EF1	Trees were snapped and uprooted in a shelter belt.						
EFU	NW of Greensburg	Kiowa	KS	37.6399°N 99.3576°W	04:48–04:54	4.59 mi (7.39 km)	75 yd (69 m)
EFU	This tornado remained over open fields, and caused no documented damage.						
EF1	NW of Greensburg	Kiowa	KS	37.6611°N 99.3871°W	04:49–04:54	3.48 mi (5.60 km)	75 yd (69 m)
EF1	This tornado occurred simultaneously with the previous tornado, and flipped a pivot irrigation system.						
EF1	W of Fellsburg	Edwards	KS	37.763°N 99.2557°W	04:59–05:08	6.32 mi (10.17 km)	100 yd (91 m)
EF1	Several pivot irrigation systems were damaged.						
EF1	NW of Trousdale	Edwards	KS	37.7538°N 99.1067°W	05:05–05:12	6.58 mi (10.59 km)	100 yd (91 m)
EF1	This tornado touched down near Trousdale, where an extremely narrow vortex flipped a center pivot irrigation sprinkler. As it moved northeast, a silo was toppled and trees were damaged. Considerable damage occurred at a farm shortly before the tornado lifted.						

=== October 13 event ===
List of confirmed tornadoes – Wednesday, October 13, 2021
EF#	Location	County / Parish	State	Start Coord.	Time (UTC)	Path length	Max width
EF1	Mustang to Southwestern Oklahoma City	Canadian	OK	35.39°N 97.776°W	09:59–10:06	6.4 mi (10.3 km)	150 yd (140 m)
EF1	Trees, powerlines, and roofs were damaged in Mustang and in the southwestern part of Oklahoma City. A parked pickup truck was flipped.						
EF1	Oklahoma City	Oklahoma	OK	35.475°N 97.562°W	10:15–10:19	3.25 mi (5.23 km)	75 yd (69 m)
EF1	This tornado primarily damaged trees as it moved just northwest of downtown Oklahoma City.						
EF0	W of Forest Park to N of Spencer	Oklahoma	OK	35.508°N 97.4595°W	10:22–10:28	4.24 mi (6.82 km)	50 yd (46 m)
EF0	Sporadic tree damage was observed.						
EF0	SW of Onida	Sully	SD	44.69°N 100.09°W	18:15–18:16	0.24 mi (0.39 km)	10 yd (9.1 m)
EF0	A very brief tornado produced no damage.						
EF0	S of Goodwill	Roberts	SD	45.46°N 97.1°W	20:03–20:08	2.35 mi (3.78 km)	10 yd (9.1 m)
EF0	A trained spotter reported a brief tornado.						
EF0	NE of Wilmot	Roberts	SD	45.44°N 96.76°W	20:25–20:26	0.15 mi (0.24 km)	10 yd (9.1 m)
EF0	The public reported a brief tornado.						
EF0	NE of Corona	Roberts	SD	45.3985°N 96.5952°W	20:30–20:31	0.09 mi (0.14 km)	10 yd (9.1 m)
EF0	A trained spotter reported a brief tornado as it became a waterspout over Big Stone Lake.						
EF0	N of Odessa	Big Stone	MN	45.3°N 96.34°W	20:33–20:34	0.05 mi (0.080 km)	10 yd (9.1 m)
EF0	A photograph caught this tornado.						
EF0	NW of Clinton	Big Stone	MN	45.51°N 96.5°W	20:42–20:43	0.35 mi (0.56 km)	10 yd (9.1 m)
EF0	The Graceville fire department reported this tornado.						
EF0	S of Barry	Big Stone	MN	45.5°N 96.56°W	20:46–20:47	0.04 mi (0.064 km)	10 yd (9.1 m)
EF0	A photograph caught this tornado.						
EF0	NW of Stirum	Sargent	ND	46.23°N 97.92°W	21:04–21:08	5.42 mi (8.72 km)	25 yd (23 m)
EF0	No damage was found as this tornado remained over open grassland.						
EF1	NE of White Rock, SD	Traverse	MN	45.9346°N 96.5524°W	21:18–21:24	2.8 mi (4.5 km)	20 yd (18 m)
EF1	A north-moving tornado tossed a quarter of a metal pole barn's roof, damaging a nearby power line. Another pole barn was demolished, with its poles lifted completely out of the ground on the southwest side of the structure. Trees were downed. A grain auger and a hay trailer were flipped over.						
EF0	W of Herman	Traverse	MN	45.8019°N 96.293°W	21:20–21:24	0.43 mi (0.69 km)	10 yd (9.1 m)
EF0	A tree was uprooted, damaging the deck of a house upon falling. Minor shingle damage occurred to two houses. Several farm implements were slid or displaced several feet from their locations. A large machine shed had a quarter of its roof ripped off and tossed about 80 yd (73 m). A corn crop field was also damaged.						

=== October 14 event ===
List of confirmed tornadoes – Friday, October 14, 2021
EF#	Location	County / Parish	State	Start Coord.	Time (UTC)	Path length	Max width
EF0	Grant Township	St. Clair	MI	43.0921°N 82.6055°W	22:12–22:14	0.43 mi (0.69 km)	120 yd (110 m)
EF0	This brief weak tornado damaged a carport, snapped pine trees, and caused minor damage to a home.						

=== October 15 event ===
List of confirmed tornadoes – Friday, October 15, 2021
EF#	Location	County / Parish	State	Start Coord.	Time (UTC)	Path length	Max width
EF1	E of Winslow to W of Combs	Washington, Madison	AR	35.807°N 94.029°W	10:22–10:34	7.8 mi (12.6 km)	500 yd (460 m)
EF1	This tornado moved through the rural community of Sunset, where a mobile home was damaged, a chicken house was destroyed, and several trees were snapped or uprooted.						
EF0	NNE of Clyde to WSW of Castalia	Sandusky	OH	41.3896°N 82.936°W	19:42–19:49	3.82 mi (6.15 km)	50 yd (46 m)
EF0	A house lost shingles and plywood with a wooden deck and detached garage moved. Another house sustained damage to gutters and a TV antenna. Tree limbs were downed and spiral marks were left in fields.						
EF0	N of Macon	Pulaski	AR	34.939°N 92.1654°W	20:20–20:24	2.5 mi (4.0 km)	100 yd (91 m)
EF0	Trees were downed and outbuildings were damaged along the path.						
EF1	SE of Gentryville	Spencer	IN	38.0852°N 87.0117°W	01:10–01:14	1 mi (1.6 km)	50 yd (46 m)
EF1	A barn was pushed about 20 feet (6.1 m) off its foundation and a house was hit by a falling tree. Several trees were snapped and swirl marks were left in a corn field.						
EF0	NE of New Pekin	Washington	IN	38.543°N 85.9602°W	02:12–02:15	2.7 mi (4.3 km)	70 yd (64 m)
EF0	Homes sustained minor roof damage. Trees and tree limbs were downed, with some falling on homes, causing significant damage to a carport and a pickup truck.						
EF0	Lexington	Scott	IN	38.6491°N 85.6355°W	02:40-02:41	0.6 mi (0.97 km)	75 yd (69 m)
EF0	Homes in town sustained shingle damage and nearby loose objects were thrown. Numerous trees were uprooted, twisted or snapped. Power poles were snapped and cracked.						
EF0	SE of Allensburg	Highland	OH	39.1881°N 83.7364°W	04:53–04:56	1.77 mi (2.85 km)	50 yd (46 m)
EF0	The roof of a home was damaged and windows were broken. An outbuilding sustained roof damage, and trees were uprooted or damaged.						

=== October 16 event ===
List of confirmed tornadoes – Saturday, October 16, 2021
EF#	Location	County / Parish	State	Start Coord.	Time (UTC)	Path length	Max width
EF1	NE of Hillsboro	Highland	OH	39.2454°N 83.5936°W	05:03–05:08	3.06 mi (4.92 km)	70 yd (64 m)
EF1	Several outbuildings were severely damaged. A garage door was blown in at a house, causing damage to an exterior wall. Numerous trees were snapped or uprooted. About 1 mi (1.6 km) of the tornado's path couldn't be surveyed due to lack of road availability.						
EF0	WSW of South Salem	Ross	OH	39.326°N 83.340°W	05:25–05:26	0.12 mi (0.19 km)	20 yd (18 m)
EF0	A large shipping container and several outbuildings were blown from their original positions. Nearly the entire roof covering on a manufactured home was removed. One child sustained minor injuries due to flying glass.						
EF2	South Salem	Ross	OH	39.3375°N 83.3086°W	05:28–05:31	0.86 mi (1.38 km)	100 yd (91 m)
EF2	A brief but damaging tornado touched down in South Salem. One outbuilding structure that was bolted to a concrete foundation was lofted and completely destroyed. One home sustained major structural damage, and lost nearly all of its exterior walls. The roof of the home was removed, and pieces of the roof were found scattered throughout in South Salem. Trees were damaged, some significantly, and other structures in town sustained minor to moderate damage. Power lines were downed as well.						
EF0	ENE of Frankfort to W of Andersonville	Ross	OH	39.421°N 83.118°W	05:42–05:48	3.42 mi (5.50 km)	75 yd (69 m)
EF0	Part of the roof of a home was blown off and landed across the street. The back porch of a home was destroyed, and trees were uprooted along the path.						
EF1	NW of Kingston	Pickaway	OH	39.4890°N 82.9518°W	05:59–06:03	2.72 mi (4.38 km)	80 yd (73 m)
EF1	The tornado struck a two-story home, lifting the roof off the home and throwing it nearly 400 yd (370 m) away. A home on the other side of the street sustained roof and siding damage. The roof of a metal shed was torn off, and numerous trees were snapped or uprooted.						
EF1	N of Chandlersville	Muskingum	OH	39.9006°N 81.8391°W	07:44–07:47	1.37 mi (2.20 km)	350 yd (320 m)
EF1	Several homes sustained roof and siding damage. Some farm buildings were considerably damaged, with some roof debris being found up to 1 mi (1.6 km) downwind. A cement silo that survived the June 2012 North American derecho was damaged. Trees were snapped or uprooted.						
EF0	SSE of New Concord	Guernsey	OH	39.9640°N 81.7219°W	07:53–07:54	0.31 mi (0.50 km)	25 yd (23 m)
EF0	A cinder-block outbuilding was destroyed and the roof of a barn was partially removed. Minor tree damage was observed.						
EF0	Shippingport	Beaver	PA	40.6269°N 80.428°W	10:06–10:07	0.94 mi (1.51 km)	50 yd (46 m)
EF0	The roof of a pavilion in town was blown off. Trees were uprooted and tree branches were snapped.						
EF1	S of Monaca to E of Freedom	Beaver	PA	40.674°N 80.270°W	10:16–10:18	2.11 mi (3.40 km)	200 yd (180 m)
EF1	In Monaca, the roof of a mobile home was torn off and trees were uprooted. One tree landed onto a car, damaging the car's windshield. The tornado crossed the Ohio River into Freedom, where at least 30 trees were uprooted. The awning of a front porch was damaged by a falling tree.						
EF1	ENE of Clarington	Jefferson, Elk	PA	41.35°N 79.05°W	12:08–12:10	0.75 mi (1.21 km)	260 yd (240 m)
EF1	This brief, low-end EF1 tornado touched down in Clear Creek State Park on the south side of Clarion River in Jefferson County, and crossed over into Elk County before dissipating. Several trees were snapped or uprooted, especially in the latter county where one tree fell on a cabin. One injury was reported.						

=== October 21 event ===
List of confirmed tornadoes – Thursday, October 21, 2021
EF#	Location	County / Parish	State	Start Coord.	Time (UTC)	Path length	Max width
EF1	Hinckley Township	Medina	OH	41.2182°N 81.7679°W	20:36–20:42	2.57 mi (4.14 km)	50 yd (46 m)
EF1	Trees were downed and a home suffered roof and siding damage.						
EF0	ENE of Seville	Medina	OH	41.0171°N 81.8154°W	20:44–20:45	0.29 mi (0.47 km)	50 yd (46 m)
EF0	A spiraling damage path was left in a corn field.						
EF1	Wickliffe	Lake	OH	41.6079°N 81.4525°W	20:49–20:50	0.18 mi (0.29 km)	50 yd (46 m)
EF1	Several homes were damaged in Wickliffe, one of which sustained considerable damage. Trees were snapped near the Pine Ridge Country Club as well.						
EF0	Hudson	Summit	OH	41.2686°N 81.4409°W	21:08–21:11	0.78 mi (1.26 km)	25 yd (23 m)
EF0	Intermittent tree damage occurred in Hudson.						
EF1	W of North Canton	Stark	OH	40.8632°N 81.4877°W	21:10–21:15	2.96 mi (4.76 km)	50 yd (46 m)
EF1	Trees and buildings sustained high-end EF1 damage in Jackson Township. A large garage and multiple recreational buildings were heavily damaged at North Park. Some businesses were damaged as well.						
EF1	Southern Mecca	Trumbull	OH	41.3796°N 80.736°W	22:15-22:18	0.66 mi (1.06 km)	50 yd (46 m)
EF1	Several homes were damaged in a subdivision in the southern part of Mecca, and trees were snapped or uprooted.						
EF0	E of Mecca	Trumbull	OH	41.3865°N 80.6642°W	22:20–22:21	0.08 mi (0.13 km)	20 yd (18 m)
EF0	A very brief tornado damaged some trees.						
EF0	SSE of Aurora	Portage	OH	41.2852°N 81.3307°W	22:21–22:22	0.22 mi (0.35 km)	25 yd (23 m)
EF0	An AC unit on top of a four-story building was blown over. The four-story building sustained minor roof damage. Tree limbs were snapped.						
EF1	NNE of New Galilee	Beaver	PA	40.8442°N 80.3791°W	22:56–22:59	1.64 mi (2.64 km)	40 yd (37 m)
EF1	Numerous tree branches were broken and one softwood tree was uprooted. A tree limb fell on a garage, damaging its roof.						
EF1	SW of Mount Pleasant	Jefferson	OH	40.1652°N 80.8291°W	23:03–23:05	0.43 mi (0.69 km)	70 yd (64 m)
EF1	One house lost shingles. Damage was otherwise limited to trees that were snapped, uprooted, or had broken branches.						
EF1	Loomis to E of Warnock	Belmont	OH	40.029°N 81.0045°W	23:06–23:09	7.86 mi (12.65 km)	50 yd (46 m)
EF1	An intermittent tornado blew the roof off a business, destroyed a shed, and toppled a motor home onto two sports cars, damaging them. Trees were downed and had broken branches.						
EF1	ESE of Ellport to NW of Harmony	Beaver, Butler	PA	40.843°N 80.1983°W	23:11–23:16	2.63 mi (4.23 km)	110 yd (100 m)
EF1	Numerous hardwood and softwood trees were uprooted, snapped, or had large branches broken.						
EF2	NE of Bethany, WV to N of Houston, PA	Washington	PA	40.2283°N 80.507°W	23:30–23:57	15.67 mi (25.22 km)	700 yd (640 m)
EF2	This tornado caused significant damage as it moved through Buffalo Township. A two-story house lost its roof, with portions of its walls collapsed and foundation blocks shifted. Another house was also unroofed and its attached garage was destroyed, along with a farm building. A mobile home sustained roof damage and a well-built deck was torn off. Other structures were damaged along the path and many large trees were uprooted and snapped.						
EF0	NW of Butler to NNE of East Butler	Butler	PA	40.88°N 79.95°W	23:33–23:51	8.72 mi (14.03 km)	300 yd (270 m)
EF0	Numerous trees were uprooted and snapped and flagpoles were bent.						
EF0	Mount Nebo	Allegheny	PA	40.5347°N 80.0713°W	23:41–23:42	0.54 mi (0.87 km)	100 yd (91 m)
EF0	A brief tornado blew out glass doors and damaged a sign at a Target store, caused minor tree damage, and blew down tall grass.						
EF1	Allison Park to W of Indianola	Allegheny	PA	40.5637°N 79.9813°W	23:47–23:55	4.7 mi (7.6 km)	400 yd (370 m)
EF1	This tornado was spawned by the same circulation as the Mount Nebo tornado. A cinder block outbuilding was destroyed, homes sustained minor damage, and numerous trees were uprooted and snapped. One home was struck by a falling tree.						
EF1	West Finley Township	Washington	PA	39.998°N 80.365°W	23:58–00:00	0.53 mi (0.85 km)	50 yd (46 m)
EF1	A barn was destroyed, a shed sustained roof damage, and trees were snapped and uprooted.						
EF1	East Finley Township	Washington	PA	40.06°N 80.364°W	23:59–00:00	0.38 mi (0.61 km)	30 yd (27 m)
EF1	Trees were snapped and a distinct convergent pattern was observed in a grassy open pasture.						
EF1	Peters Township	Washington	PA	40.2534°N 80.0961°W	00:07–00:10	1.52 mi (2.45 km)	200 yd (180 m)
EF1	Several homes had shingle and window damage, and a garage door was blown out. Trees were uprooted and snapped as well.						

=== October 24 event ===
List of confirmed tornadoes – Sunday, October 24, 2021
EF#	Location	County / Parish	State	Start Coord.	Time (UTC)	Path length	Max width
EF0	N of Bendena to NW of Troy	Doniphan	KS	39.7587°N 95.1728°W	19:03–19:12	4.35 mi (7.00 km)	25 yd (23 m)
EF0	Trees were downed and a few structures were damaged.						
EF1	WSW of Kingston	Clinton, Caldwell	MO	39.6181°N 94.2138°W	20:27–20:33	4.64 mi (7.47 km)	40 yd (37 m)
EF1	A metal barn was heavily damaged, a house lost some shingles, and trees were downed.						
EF0	NW of Pattonsburg	Daviess	MO	40.0218°N 94.1748°W	20:36–20:37	0.14 mi (0.23 km)	20 yd (18 m)
EF0	A very brief tornado destroyed an empty grain bin and damaged a few others. An open ended outbuilding was also destroyed.						
EF0	NW of Chillicothe	Livingston	MO	39.8385°N 93.6487°W	21:16–21:17	0.15 mi (0.24 km)	50 yd (46 m)
EF0	A brief tornado heavily damaged a barn.						
EF2	NE of Chillicothe to S of Purdin to SE of Winigan	Livingston, Linn	MO	39.8778°N 93.4205°W	21:31–22:18	31.37 mi (50.49 km)	150 yd (140 m)
EF2	This strong tornado first caused roof, window, and gutter damage to a few homes, and destroyed outbuildings near Chillicothe. The most severe damage occurred south of Purdin, where a house had its roof torn off, and an office trailer was rolled and destroyed at a propane plant. The tornado then caused additional roof and outbuilding damage before dissipating. Many large trees were snapped or uprooted along the path.						
EF0	S of Sedalia	Pettis	MO	38.6651°N 93.2226°W	21:54–21:55	0.47 mi (0.76 km)	10 yd (9.1 m)
EF0	A weak tornado produced narrow corn swirls in a field.						
EF0	Eastern Sedalia	Pettis	MO	38.6954°N 93.1778°W	21:59–22:00	1.22 mi (1.96 km)	10 yd (9.1 m)
EF0	A weak tornado impacted the eastern outskirts of Sedalia, causing minor damage to trees and homes.						
EF1	NE of Gladden	Dent	MO	37.49°N 91.45°W	23:34–23:46	8.16 mi (13.13 km)	400 yd (370 m)
EF1	Numerous trees were downed, and a home sustained structural damage.						
EF1	NW of Richland	Camden	MO	37.8961°N 92.4145°W	23:53–23:57	2.17 mi (3.49 km)	100 yd (91 m)
EF1	The roof was blown off a house, a barn was damaged, and trees were uprooted, with large tree limbs being snapped off as well.						
EF1	NNW of Lesterville	Reynolds	MO	37.5267°N 90.8578°W	00:43–00:46	1.17 mi (1.88 km)	100 yd (91 m)
EF1	Widespread tree damage occurred in Johnson's Shut-Ins State Park.						
EF3	S of Farmington to NE of Coffman	St. Francois, Ste. Genevieve	MO	37.70°N 90.41°W	01:23–01:49	16.91 mi (27.21 km)	400 yd (370 m)
EF3	A strong tornado touched down south of Farmington and rapidly intensified as it crossed US 67 and moved northeast, where multiple homes sustained partial to total roof loss, some had exterior walls collapsed, and one was completely destroyed. Barns and outbuildings were also destroyed, and many trees and power poles were snapped along this segment of the path as well. The tornado weakened as it moved through the small community of Coffman, where homes, a church, and a brewery sustained roof and window damage, an outbuilding next to the church was destroyed, fencing was blown over, and trees and power poles were downed. One person sustained minor injuries.						
EF1	NE of Annapolis to SW of Fredericktown	Iron, Madison	MO	37.449°N 90.609°W	01:29–01:44	10.23 mi (16.46 km)	250 yd (230 m)
EF1	A site-built home and a mobile home were damaged. Many trees were uprooted or damaged as the tornado crossed through a densely wooded area of the Mark Twain National Forest.						
EF3	W of Fredericktown to NE of Junction City	Madison, Perry	MO	37.5425°N 90.3921°W	01:47–02:15	18.84 mi (30.32 km)	880 yd (800 m)
EF3	This large and destructive tornado touched down southwest of Fredericktown and intensified as it moved to the northeast, snapping and uprooting numerous trees. A few homes sustained significant roof damage along this portion of the path, outbuildings were damaged or destroyed, a manufactured home was rolled onto its side, and a pickup truck was lifted and dropped onto a car. The tornado then crossed Route 72 and US 67 at peak strength as it impacted the northwestern fringes of Fredericktown. Numerous homes and business were severely damaged or destroyed in this area, and debris was scattered long distances across fields. At least one poorly anchored home was leveled, other homes were left with only a few walls standing, and multiple self-storage buildings and some outbuildings were obliterated. A church was also damaged, and a few large metal-framed warehouses were completely destroyed, including one at the Black River Electric Co-op, where several other buildings were damaged or destroyed on the property. The tornado then weakened and crossed City Lake, but still caused considerable damage as it struck Junction City, where homes and businesses sustained heavy damage to roofs, windows, and siding, outbuildings and garages were destroyed, and trees were downed. It continued to the northeast past Junction City, where a house lost its roof and sustained some collapse of exterior walls. Additional damage to trees, roofs, and outbuildings occurred before the tornado dissipated. One person was injured.						
EF2	SW of St. Mary, MO to northwestern Chester, IL to NE of Bremen, IL	Ste. Genevieve (MO), Randolph (IL)	MO, IL	37.86°N 89.98°W	02:02–02:28	16.74 mi (26.94 km)	400 yd (370 m)
EF2	This strong tornado, which came from the same supercell as the Farmington/Coffman EF3, touched down southwest of St. Mary before directly striking the town, destroying garages and outbuildings, severely damaging several homes, flipping cars, and downing numerous trees and power lines. A large antique mall in St. Mary had its roof torn off, and sustained some collapse of brick exterior walls. A tornado emergency was issued as the tornado crossed the Mississippi River into Illinois and struck the town of Chester, where homes sustained roof damage, a few smaller homes were unroofed, and a shed and a well-built garage building were destroyed. A hardware store in town had its back exterior wall bowed out, and a nursing home had roofing peeled off and HVAC units blown off the roof. The weakening tornado then moved along IL 150 and impacted Bremen, where homes sustained mostly minor roof and siding damage, tree damage occurred, and some outbuildings were damaged or destroyed. Minor tree limb damage occurred farther northeast of Bremen before the tornado dissipated.						
EF1	SW of Perryville	Perry	MO	37.61°N 90.06°W	02:42–02:45	2.3 mi (3.7 km)	25 yd (23 m)
EF1	Trees were snapped or uprooted.						
EF0	NW of Richview	Washington	IL	38.393°N 89.204°W	02:54–02:55	2.05 mi (3.30 km)	180 yd (160 m)
EF0	A barn sustained roof loss and structural damage, a house sustained roof and siding damage, and numerous trees were downed.						
EF1	N of Shook to NE of Glennon	Wayne, Bollinger	MO	37.0968°N 90.32°W	04:04–04:30	24.49 mi (39.41 km)	400 yd (370 m)
EF1	The roof of a school gym was damaged in Zalma, with air conditioner units being blown off the school's roof. The top half of a two-story barn was destroyed, and the roof of a chicken house was damaged. Numerous trees were snapped or uprooted along the path.						

=== October 25 event ===
List of confirmed tornadoes – Monday, October 25, 2021
EF#	Location	County / Parish	State	Start Coord.	Time (UTC)	Path length	Max width
EF1	NW of Turbeville	Halifax	VA	36.6796°N 79.1481°W	00:02–00:08	2.32 mi (3.73 km)	75 yd (69 m)
EF1	Trees were snapped or uprooted along the path.						

=== October 26 event ===
List of confirmed tornadoes – Tuesday, October 26, 2021
EF#	Location	County / Parish	State	Start Coord.	Time (UTC)	Path length	Max width
EFU	WNW of Leedey	Roger Mills	OK	35.908°N 99.479°W	01:55	0.2 mi (0.32 km)	50 yd (46 m)
EFU	A storm chaser reported a brief tornado.						
EF0	Turon	Reno	KS	37.809°N 98.4275°W	03:10–03:15	0.43 mi (0.69 km)	275 yd (251 m)
EF0	A weak tornado moved through Turon, damaging tree tops. Roof panels were removed from a structure as well.						
EF0	Southern Union City	Canadian	OK	35.388°N 97.942°W	04:54	0.3 mi (0.48 km)	20 yd (18 m)
EF0	Trees and two barns were damaged at the south edge of town.						
EF1	Northeastern Norman	Cleveland	OK	35.258°N 97.413°W	05:36–05:45	6.6 mi (10.6 km)	50 yd (46 m)
EF1	This tornado moved from the northeastern part of Norman to just southeast of Lake Stanley Draper, damaging homes and trees.						

=== October 27 event ===
List of confirmed tornadoes – Wednesday, October 27, 2021
EF#	Location	County / Parish	State	Start Coord.	Time (UTC)	Path length	Max width
EF0	SW of Porter Heights	Montgomery	TX	30.12°N 95.36°W	13:50	0.02 mi (0.032 km)	20 yd (18 m)
EF0	A very brief tornado was caught on video near Grand Oaks High School. The only apparent damage was a flipped soccer goal.						
EF0	Port Acres	Jefferson	TX	29.9036°N 94.0196°W	13:54–13:55	0.33 mi (0.53 km)	100 yd (91 m)
EF0	A brief tornado damaged outbuildings, caused minor damage to homes, and downed numerous tree limbs in the Port Acres neighborhood of Port Arthur.						
EFU	W of Bridge City	Orange	TX	30.0094°N 93.9226°W	14:21–14:24	3.23 mi (5.20 km)	Unknown
EFU	A tornado was caught on video and a tornado debris signature appeared on radar, but the tornado touched down in an inaccessible area and the path couldn't be surveyed.						
EF2	NW of Pinehurst	Orange	TX	30.1108°N 93.8337°W	14:33–14:39	2.06 mi (3.32 km)	50 yd (46 m)
EF2	A brick home was severely damaged and lost a significant portion of its roofing, and a large storage shed nearby was destroyed. Trees were downed, and an RV camper was thrown 25 yd (23 m). A truck was flipped, three vehicles were pushed out of a driveway, and an ATV was lofted and thrown across Interstate 10. Large metal garage buildings were also damaged and had their metal overhead doors blown in at a Texas Department of Transportation maintenance facility.						
EF2	SE of Mauriceville to S of Deweyville	Orange, Newton	TX	30.1772°N 93.8033°W	14:45–14:59	6.89 mi (11.09 km)	100 yd (91 m)
EF2	A few mobile homes were damaged or destroyed, including a double-wide mobile home that was flipped, critically injuring one person. Multiple site-built homes were damaged, including some that had their roofs torn off, and one that had an exterior wall blown out. Storage sheds and garages were also heavily damaged or destroyed, and trees were downed along the path.						
EF1	SW of Fields	Beauregard	LA	30.4258°N 93.6528°W	15:35–15:38	1.86 mi (2.99 km)	100 yd (91 m)
EF1	Trees were snapped and uprooted.						
EFU	NE of Starks	Calcasieu	LA	30.3346°N 93.6165°W	16:44–16:45	0.62 mi (1.00 km)	1 yd (0.91 m)
EFU	A tornado debris signature was detected in an area without roads. No damage could be seen from the nearest highway.						
EFU	W of Hackberry	Cameron	LA	29.94°N 93.55°W	16:49–16:55	3.98 mi (6.41 km)	Unknown
EFU	A tornado debris signature appeared on radar with this tornado. The tornado remained over inaccessible marshland.						
EF1	SE of Vinton	Calcasieu	LA	30.1263°N 93.5235°W	16:52–16:56	2.8 mi (4.5 km)	85 yd (78 m)
EF1	A home and some trees were damaged.						
EF2	Southern Lake Charles	Calcasieu	LA	30.1518°N 93.2668°W	17:20–17:23	2.2 mi (3.5 km)	300 yd (270 m)
EF2	A dozen homes sustained significant damage as this strong tornado moved through a residential area in the southern part of Lake Charles. Several of the homes had roofs torn off, and a few sustained collapse of some exterior walls. Two people were injured by flying debris.						
EF1	Eastern Lake Charles	Calcasieu	LA	30.2078°N 93.1775°W	17:28–17:29	0.92 mi (1.48 km)	50 yd (46 m)
EF1	A brief tornado touched impacted the east side of Lake Charles, where two large warehouse buildings had sections of their roofs and exterior walls collapsed. Trees were snapped or uprooted as well.						
EF0	NE of Lettsworth	Concordia	LA	31.012°N 91.6317°W	20:56–20:58	1.75 mi (2.82 km)	25 yd (23 m)
EF0	A brief tornado snapped large tree limbs and uprooted trees. The path may have been longer as a portion of it was not accessible to the ground survey team.						
EF0	Mandeville	St. Tammany	LA	30.3685°N 90.0926°W	21:52–21:53	0.22 mi (0.35 km)	25 yd (23 m)
EF0	A brief tornado moved off of Lake Pontchartrain, damaging the tin roofs of a house and another structure, and damaging a small tree.						
EF1	Eastern Picayune	Pearl River	MS	30.5196°N 89.6734°W	23:49–23:53	2.44 mi (3.93 km)	125 yd (114 m)
EF1	This high-end EF1 tornado moved through the east side of Picayune, where a mobile home was completely destroyed, and another was spun 180 degrees and badly damaged. Carports and sections of roofing were ripped off of homes, and other minor structural damage occurred. Trees were downed and many tree branches were snapped in town.						
EF1	Moss Point	Jackson	MS	30.4003°N 88.5177°W	01:31–01:35	0.86 mi (1.38 km)	50 yd (46 m)
EF1	1 death – The tornado struck a car traveling along MS 63, with the driver being fatally injured after losing control of the vehicle and being ejected. A house lost a large section of its roof, and other structures in town sustained minor roof damage. Trees were damaged, and parked cars were moved and had windows blown out.						

=== October 28 event ===
List of confirmed tornadoes – Thursday, October 28, 2021
EF#	Location	County / Parish	State	Start Coord.	Time (UTC)	Path length	Max width
EFU	NW of Myakka City	Manatee	FL	27.39°N 82.22°W	18:16–18:23	2.82 mi (4.54 km)	50 yd (46 m)
EFU	A tornado debris signature appeared on radar in association with this tornado. No damage was found.						

== November ==
Confirmed tornadoes by Enhanced Fujita rating
EFU	EF0	EF1	EF2	EF3	EF4	EF5	Total
1	15	5	0	0	0	0	21

=== November 10 event ===
List of confirmed tornadoes – Wednesday, November 10, 2021
EF#	Location	County / Parish	State	Start Coord.	Time (UTC)	Path length	Max width
EFU	SE of Bray	Stephens	OK	34.61°N 97.76°W	00:35–00:48	4 mi (6.4 km)	100 yd (91 m)
EFU	A tornado was observed by multiple storm chasers. No damage was reported.						
EF0	Tulsa	Tulsa	OK	36.132°N 95.976°W	01:14–01:16	0.5 mi (0.80 km)	150 yd (140 m)
EF0	This brief tornado developed over Woodward Park and moved east. Trees were uprooted and large tree limbs were snapped along the path before the tornado dissipated near Utica Square.						
EF0	NNE of Broken Arrow	Wagoner	OK	36.118°N 95.761°W	01:26–01:27	0.4 mi (0.64 km)	100 yd (91 m)
EF0	A barn and a small grain silo were damaged. Large tree limbs were snapped.						
EF0	SW of Catoosa	Rogers	OK	36.179°N 95.764°W	01:29–01:30	0.3 mi (0.48 km)	80 yd (73 m)
EF0	Large tree limbs were snapped.						

=== November 11 event ===
List of confirmed tornadoes – Thursday, November 11, 2021
EF#	Location	County / Parish	State	Start Coord.	Time (UTC)	Path length	Max width
EF0	NW of Elysian Fields	Harrison	TX	32.4005°N 94.2352°W	06:40–06:41	0.58 mi (0.93 km)	50 yd (46 m)
EF0	A tornado debris signature appeared on radar in association with this tornado. Only minor tree damage was found.						
EF1	S of Waskom	Harrison	TX	32.4021°N 94.1055°W	06:51–06:53	2.63 mi (4.23 km)	50 yd (46 m)
EF1	Trees and large tree branches were snapped.						
EF1	SSW of Blanchard	Caddo	LA	32.5302°N 93.9118°W	07:02–07:03	0.16 mi (0.26 km)	100 yd (91 m)
EF1	Trees were snapped or uprooted, some of which landed onto outdoor sheds and a home causing significant damage.						
EF0	S of Ringgold	Bienville	LA	32.2551°N 93.2998°W	08:06–08:07	1.17 mi (1.88 km)	40 yd (37 m)
EF0	Tree limbs were snapped.						
EF0	ESE of Santuck	Elmore	AL	32.6170°N 86.0858°W	21:03–21:04	0.36 mi (0.58 km)	270 yd (250 m)
EF0	A brief tornado occurred with an isolated supercell, uprooting about a dozen large trees and breaking off tree limbs. One tree fell on a barn, and a manufactured home had its roof partially removed and minor damage to the deck and skirting.						

=== November 12 event ===
List of confirmed tornadoes – Friday, November 12, 2021
EF#	Location	County / Parish	State	Start Coord.	Time (UTC)	Path length	Max width
EF1	E of Millbrook	Dutchess	NY	41.766°N 73.664°W	16:12–16:16	2.44 mi (3.93 km)	200 yd (180 m)
EF1	The tornado moved through Washington to the east of the village of Millbrook, destroying a farm shed and downing numerous trees, some of which fell on homes and vehicles.						

=== November 13 event ===
List of confirmed tornadoes – Saturday, November 13, 2021
EF#	Location	County / Parish	State	Start Coord.	Time (UTC)	Path length	Max width
EF0	Woodmere to Levittown	Nassau	NY	40.6249°N 73.7198°W	19:37–19:55	13.14 mi (21.15 km)	50 yd (46 m)
EF0	This skipping tornado first touched down in Woodmere, where several trees and power lines were downed. It touched down again in Uniondale, where the roof of a two-story colonial building was ripped off and thrown onto a nearby house. It touched down for the final time in Levittown, where a large tree was downed onto a house. The total path length on the ground was a quarter mile.						
EF0	East Islip	Suffolk	NY	40.7178°N 73.1972°W	20:20–20:22	0.52 mi (0.84 km)	50 yd (46 m)
EF0	Several homes sustained minor roof and siding damage. A few dozen large trees were snapped or uprooted. Some trees had large branches sheared off.						
EF0	Cheshire	New Haven	CT	41.4875°N 72.9355°W	20:30–20:34	3.57 mi (5.75 km)	100 yd (91 m)
EF0	An SUV and RV were both crushed by fallen trees. Trees were uprooted.						
EF0	North Bellport	Suffolk	NY	40.7868°N 72.9423°W	20:40–20:42	1.28 mi (2.06 km)	35 yd (32 m)
EF0	A recycling center sustained extensive roof damage and blown out garage doors, a large road sign was flattened, and numerous trees were downed.						
EF1	Shirley to Manorville	Suffolk	NY	40.7982°N 72.8712°W	20:42–20:50	5.3 mi (8.5 km)	50 yd (46 m)
EF1	A 5-ton air conditioning unit on top of a supermarket was flipped. A covered walkway collapsed at a Chipotle Mexican Grill located in the same shopping center. Flashing was ripped off of the southern side of an Applebee's and an adjacent unoccupied retail store. The entire roof of a two-story home was torn off, which landed in the backyard of a neighboring home. This same roof also impaled itself into the side of its neighboring home to the north, causing the vertical structure of the home to become skewed. Later on, the tornado flipped or moved several single-engine planes at Brookhaven Airport. Other homes along the path sustained minor damage. Trees were snapped, uprooted, and sheared along the path.						
EF0	Branford	New Haven	CT	41.2776°N 72.7951°W	20:44–20:46	1.94 mi (3.12 km)	300 yd (270 m)
EF0	Several light tower generators in a school field were toppled. Trees were snapped or uprooted.						
EF0	Remsenburg to Westhampton	Suffolk	NY	40.8086°N 72.6949°W	20:53–21:00	3.5 mi (5.6 km)	35 yd (32 m)
EF0	Several homes sustained minor roof and siding damage, a reinforced cinder block wall was blown out of a salt barn (possibly a result of the roof lifting slightly), and several trees, shrubs, and power lines were downed.						
EF0	Hampton Bays to North Sea	Suffolk	NY	40.8513°N 72.5341°W	21:08–21:14	8.2 mi (13.2 km)	35 yd (32 m)
EF0	Several homes in Hampton Bays sustained minor damage, and outdoor furniture was tossed. The tornado then crossed Shinnecock Bay and entered North Sea, with intermittent tree damage occurring along the path before the tornado lifted.						
EF0	Plainfield, CT to Foster, RI	Windham (CT), Providence (RI)	CT, RI	41.7039°N 71.8663°W	21:48–22:02	6.13 mi (9.87 km)	100 yd (91 m)
EF0	A large trailer was moved 50 ft (15 m). Trees were uprooted and sheared along the path.						
EF1	Stonington, CT to Westerly, RI	New London (CT), Washington (RI)	CT, RI	41.3822°N 71.8364°W	21:54–22:00	1.36 mi (2.19 km)	100 yd (91 m)
EF1	In Connecticut, a metal shed was lofted and flipped before being crushed by a tree limb. One home lost a gutter while another home lost shutters. Several street signs were snapped at their bases. Several trampolines were lofted, with one becoming stuck in power lines. After crossing into Rhode Island, a wooden outbuilding was flipped onto its side before the tornado dissipated. Trees were snapped or uprooted along the path.						
EF0	North Kingstown to Wickford	Washington	RI	41.5656°N 71.4811°W	22:18–22:24	1.5 mi (2.4 km)	150 yd (140 m)
EF0	Four to five power poles were snapped in half. Trees were snapped or uprooted along the path, including one which fell onto a home causing roof and window damage. A few standing trees were sheared at the top.						

== See also ==
- Tornadoes of 2021
- List of United States tornadoes from July to September 2021
- List of United States tornadoes in December 2021
