= Bowle Spring Branch =

Stream in Virginia, US

Bowle Spring Branch Tributary to Stokes Creek
- Location of Bowle Spring Branch mouth Bowle Spring Branch (the United States)

Location
- Country: United States
- State: Virginia
- County: Halifax

Physical characteristics
- Source: Jerimy Creek divide
  - location: pond about 1.5 miles west of Cluster Springs, Virginia
  - coordinates: 36°37′17″N 078°57′32″W
  - elevation: 482 ft (147 m)
- Mouth
  - location: about 1 mile north-northwest of Cluster Springs, Virginia
  - coordinates: 36°38′27″N 078°56′17″W
  - elevation: 375 ft (114 m)
- Length: 1.86 mi (2.99 km)
- Basin size: 1.37 square miles (3.5 km^{2})
- Discharge
  - location: Stokes Creek
  - average: 1.83 cu ft/s (0.052 m^{3}/s) at mouth with Stokes Creek

Basin features
- Progression: Stokes Creek → Lawsons Creek → Dan River → Roanoke River → Albemarle Sound → Pamlico Sound → Atlantic Ocean
- River system: Roanoke River
- Tributaries
  - left: unnamed tributaries
  - right: unnamed tributaries
- Bridges: none

Bowle Spring Branch is a 1.86 mi (2.99 km) long 1st order tributary to Stokes Creek in Halifax County, Virginia.

== Course ==
Bowle Spring Branch rises in a pond about 1,5 miles west of Cluster Springs, Virginia, and then flows northeast to join Stokes Creek about 1 mile north-northwest of Cluster Springs.

== Watershed ==
Bowle Spring Branch drains 1.37 square miles (3.5 km^{2}) of area, receives about 45.7 in/year of precipitation, has a wetness index of 416.04, and is about 59% forested.

== See also ==
- List of Virginia Rivers

== Watershed Maps ==
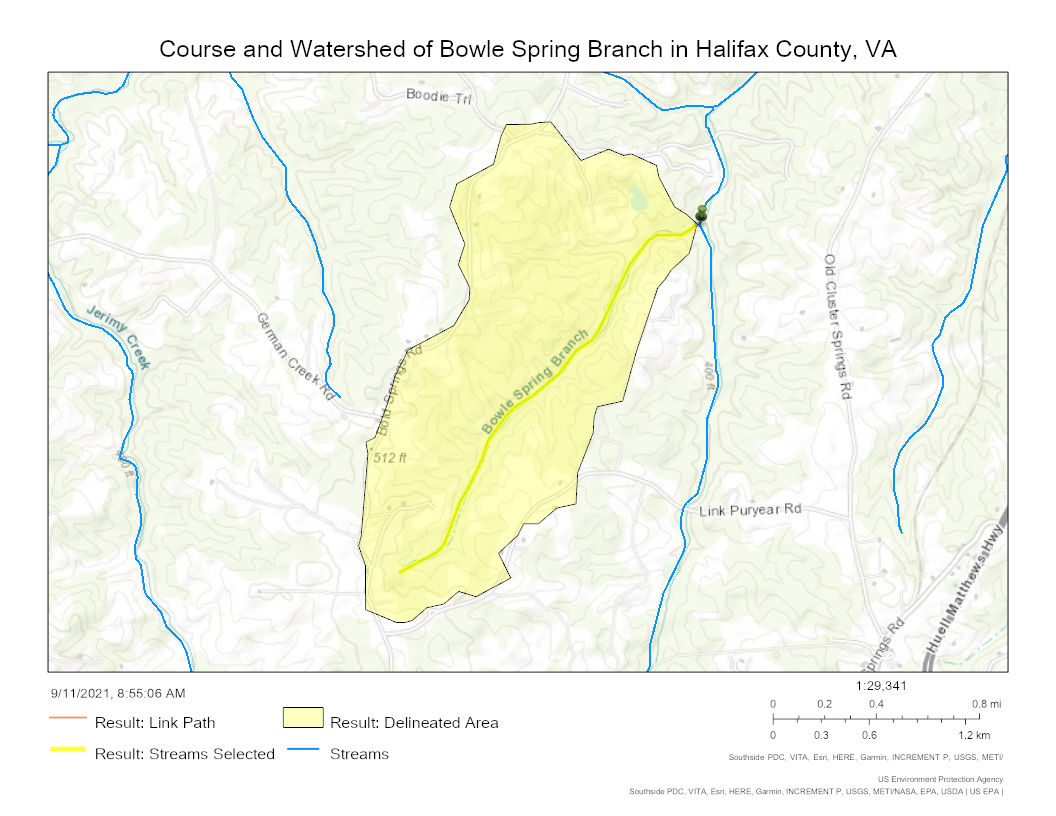
Course and Watershed of Bowle Spring Branch in Halifax County, Virginia, USA
