= Long Branch (Lawsons Creek tributary) =

Stream in Virginia, USA

Long Branch Tributary to Lawsons Creek
- Location of Long Branch mouth Long Branch (Lawsons Creek tributary) (the United States)

Location
- Country: United States
- State: Virginia
- County: Halifax

Physical characteristics
- Source: unnamed tributary to Powells Creek divide
  - location: Alton, Virginia
  - coordinates: 36°34′32″N 079°00′39″W
  - elevation: 540 ft (160 m)
- Mouth
  - location: about 1.5 miles southeast of Turbeville, Virginia
  - coordinates: 36°36′21″N 079°01′51″W
  - elevation: 420 ft (130 m)
- Length: 2.24 mi (3.60 km)
- Basin size: 3.53 square miles (9.1 km^{2})
- Discharge
  - location: Lawsons Creek
  - average: 4.58 cu ft/s (0.130 m^{3}/s) at mouth with Lawsons Creek

Basin features
- Progression: Lawsons Creek → Dan River → Roanoke River → Albemarle Sound → Pamlico Sound → Atlantic Ocean
- River system: Roanoke River
- Tributaries
  - left: West Branch Long Branch
  - right: unnamed tributaries
- Bridges: none

Long Branch is a 2.24 mi (3.60 km) long 3rd order tributary to Lawsons Creek in Halifax County, Virginia.

== Course ==
Long Branch rises in Alton, Virginia and then flows northwest and to join Lawsons Creek about 1.5 miles southeast of Turbeville.

== Watershed ==
Long Branch drains 3.53 square miles (9.1 km^{2}) of area, receives about 45.8 in/year of precipitation, has a wetness index of 385.81, and is about 50% forested.

== See also ==
- List of Virginia Rivers

== Watershed Maps ==
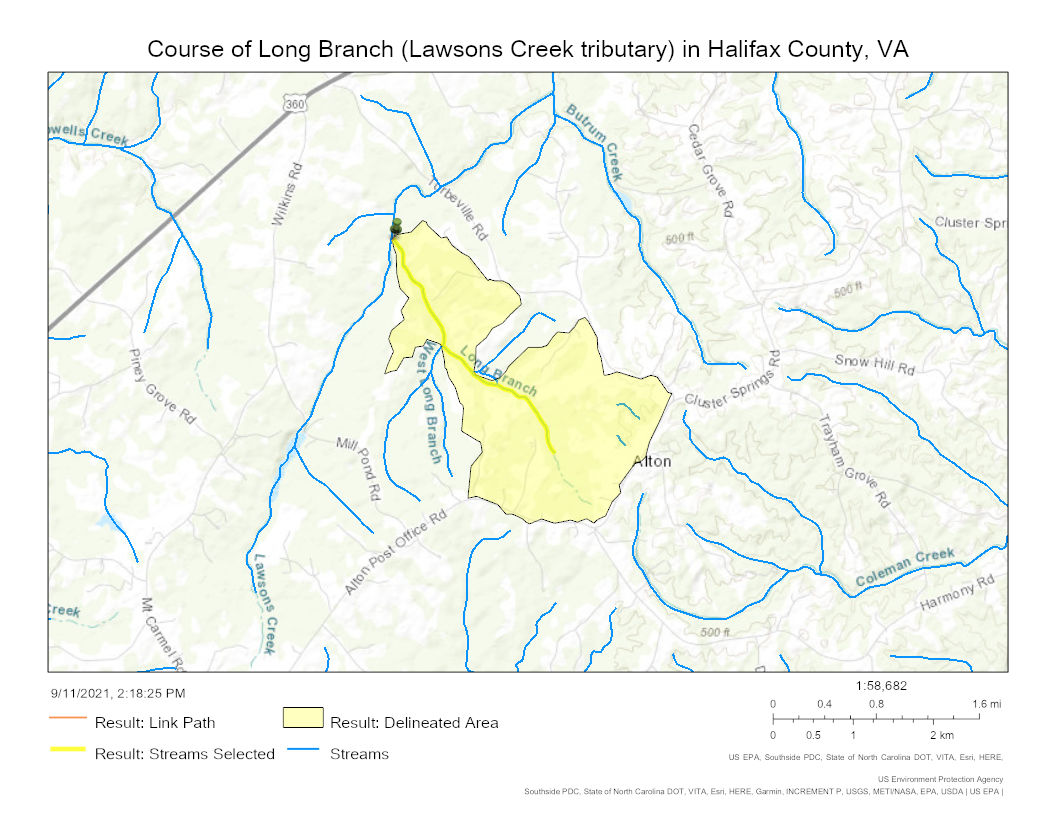
Course of Long Branch (Lawsons Creek tributary) in Halifax County, Virginia, USA

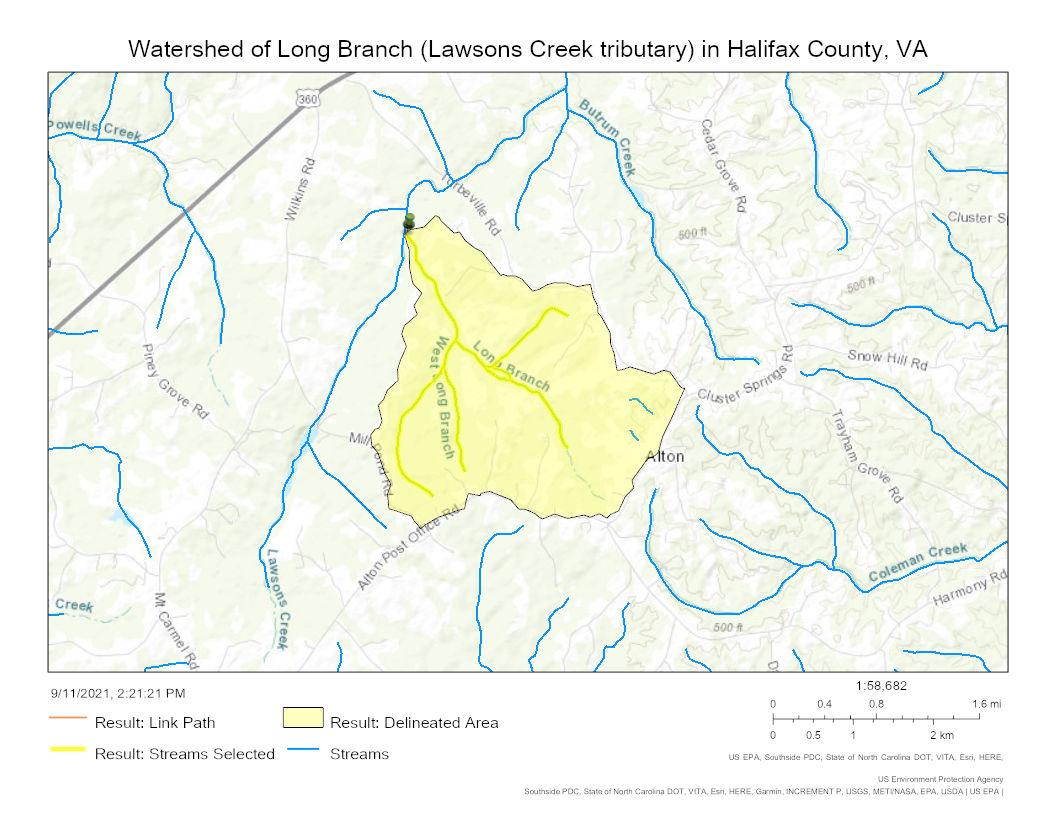
Watershed of Long Branch (Lawsons Creek tributary) in Halifax County, Virginia, USA
