= West Mecca, Ohio =

- Unincorporated community
- Location within Ohio Location within the United States
- Coordinates: 41°23′25″N 80°46′35″W
- Country: United States
- State: Ohio
- County: Trumbull

Area
  - Water: 0 sq mi (0 km^{2})
- Elevation: 932 ft (284 m)

Population (2010)
  - Total: 203,751 (Trumbull County)
- Time zone: UTC-5 (Eastern (EST))
  - Summer (DST): UTC-4 (EDT)
- Area code: 330
- GNIS feature ID: 1061744

West Mecca is an unincorporated community in Trumbull County, in the U.S. state of Ohio.

== History ==
A post office called West Mecca was established in 1875, and remained in operation until 1903. The community was founded sometime later than neighboring Mecca (formerly East Mecca). The name Mecca comes from Mecca, in the Middle East.
