= Lawsons Creek (Dan River tributary) =

Stream in Virginia, USA

Lawsons Creek Tributary to Dan River
- Location of Lawsons Creek mouth Lawsons Creek (Dan River tributary) (the United States)

Location
- Country: United States
- State: Virginia
- County: Halifax
- City: South Boston

Physical characteristics
- Source: Powells Creek divide
  - location: about 3 miles northeast of Cunningham, North Carolina
  - coordinates: 36°33′25″N 079°03′02″W
  - elevation: 525 ft (160 m)
- Mouth
  - location: southwest end of South Boston, Virginia
  - coordinates: 36°41′14″N 078°54′59″W
  - elevation: 320 ft (98 m)
- Length: 13.44 mi (21.63 km)
- Basin size: 39.80 square miles (103.1 km^{2})
- Discharge
  - location: Dan River
  - average: 46.44 cu ft/s (1.315 m^{3}/s) at mouth with Dan River

Basin features
- Progression: Dan River → Roanoke River → Albemarle Sound → Pamlico Sound → Atlantic Ocean
- River system: Roanoke River
- Tributaries
  - left: unnamed tributaries
  - right: Long Branch; Butrum Creek; Jerimy Creek; Stokes Creek
- Waterbodies: Wilkins Pond
- Bridges: Mill Pond Road, Turbeville Road, Cedar Grove Road, US 360

Lawsons Creek is a 13.44 mi (21.63 km) long 4th order tributary to the Dan River in Halifax County, Virginia.

== Course ==
Lawsons Creek rises about 3 miles northeast of Cunningham, North Carolina, and then flows northeast to join the Dan River at the southwest side of South Boston.

== Watershed ==
Lawsons Creek drains 39.80 square miles (103.1 km^{2}) of area, receives about 45.7 in/year of precipitation, has a wetness index of 425.97, and is about 43% forested.

== See also ==
- List of Virginia Rivers

== Watershed Maps ==
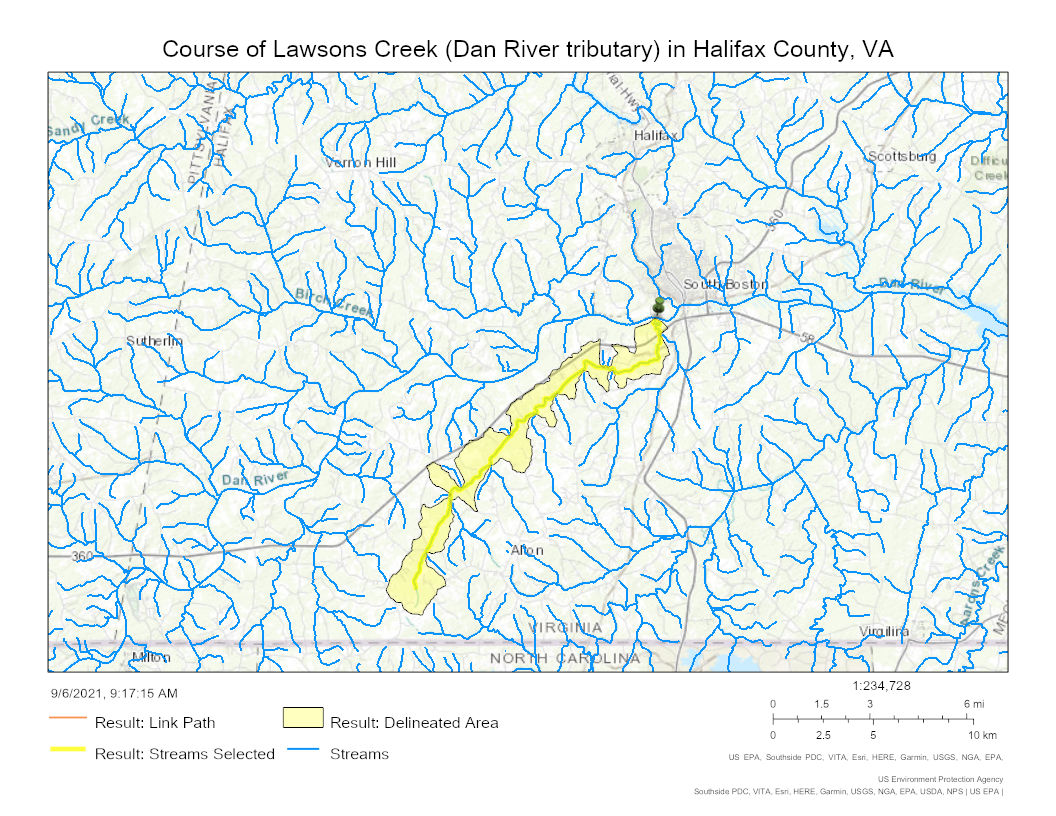
Course of Lawsons Creek (Dan River tributary) in Halifax County, Virginia, USA

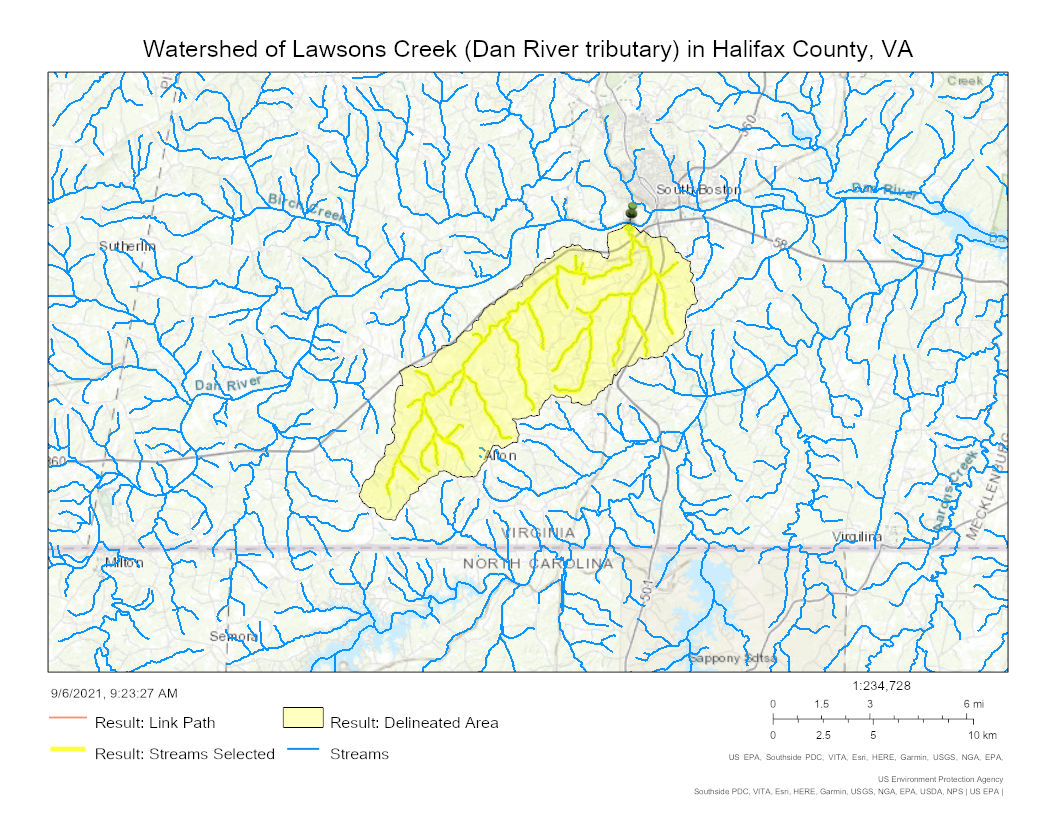
Watershed of Lawsons Creek (Dan River tributary) in Halifax County, Virginia, USA
