= Clearwater, Missouri =

Unincorporated community in Missouri, U.S.

- unincorporated community
- Location of Ste. Genevieve County, Missouri
- Coordinates: 37°45′56″N 90°08′18″W
- Country: United States
- State: Missouri
- County: Sainte Genevieve
- Township: Saline
- Elevation: 564 ft (172 m)
- Time zone: UTC-6 (Central (CST))
  - Summer (DST): UTC-5 (CDT)
- ZIP code: 63670
- Area code: 573
- FIPS code: 29-14716
- GNIS feature ID: 735962

Clearwater is an unincorporated community in Saline Township in Sainte Genevieve County, Missouri, United States. It is located approximately fifteen miles southwest of Sainte Genevieve on Missouri Supplemental Route W.

== History ==
Clearwater was named by the town's first postmaster, J. C. Nations, for Clearwater, Florida, where his cousin lived. The town is on the west coast of Florida, near Tampa.

A post office was established at Clearwater in 1929, and remained in operation until 1981.
