= Stokes Creek (Lawson Creek tributary) =

Stream in Virginia, USA

Stokes Creek Tributary to Lawsons Creek
- Location of Stokes Creek mouth Stokes Creek (Lawson Creek tributary) (the United States)

Location
- Country: United States
- State: Virginia
- County: Halifax

Physical characteristics
- Source: Bowles Spring Branch divide
  - location: about 1.5 miles west-southwest of Cluster Springs, Virginia
  - coordinates: 36°36′54″N 078°57′28″W
  - elevation: 495 ft (151 m)
- Mouth
  - location: about 0.5 miles southwest of Riverdale, Virginia
  - coordinates: 36°40′45″N 078°54′48″W
  - elevation: 320 ft (98 m)
- Length: 6.38 mi (10.27 km)
- Basin size: 13.15 square miles (34.1 km^{2})
- Discharge
  - location: Lawsons Creek
  - average: 16.04 cu ft/s (0.454 m^{3}/s) at mouth with Lawsons Creek

Basin features
- Progression: Lawsons Creek → Dan River → Roanoke River → Albemarle Sound → Pamlico Sound → Atlantic Ocean
- River system: Roanoke River
- Tributaries
  - left: Bowle Spring Branch
  - right: unnamed tributaries
- Bridges: Link Puryear Road, Old Cluster Springs Road (x2)

Stokes Creek is a 6.38 mi (10.27 km) long 3rd order tributary to Lawsons Creek in Halifax County, Virginia.

== Course ==
Stokes Creek rises about 1.5 miles west-southwest of Cluster Springs, Virginia, and then flows northeast and turns northwest to join Lawsons Creek about 0.5 miles southwest of Riverdale.

== Watershed ==
Stokes Creek drains 13.15 square miles (34.1 km^{2}) of area, receives about 45.7 in/year of precipitation, has a wetness index of 436.45, and is about 45% forested.

== See also ==
- List of Virginia Rivers

== Watershed Maps ==
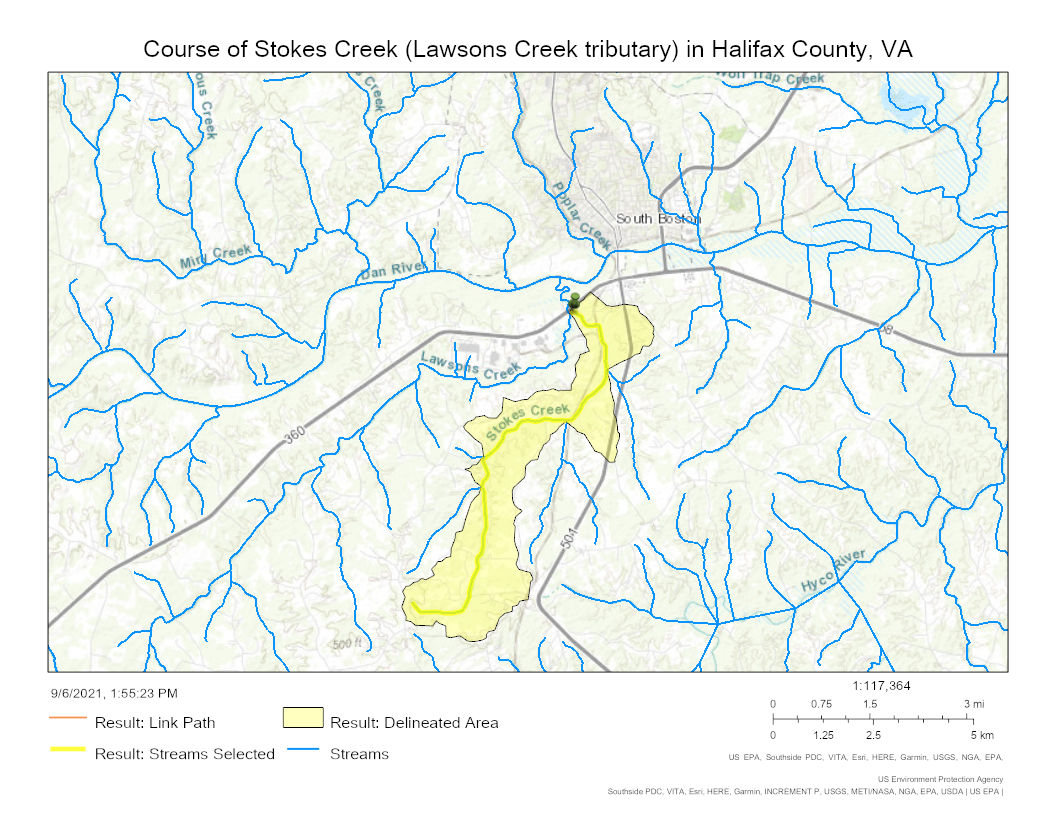
Course of Stokes Creek (Lawsons Creek tributary) in Halifax County, Virginia, USA

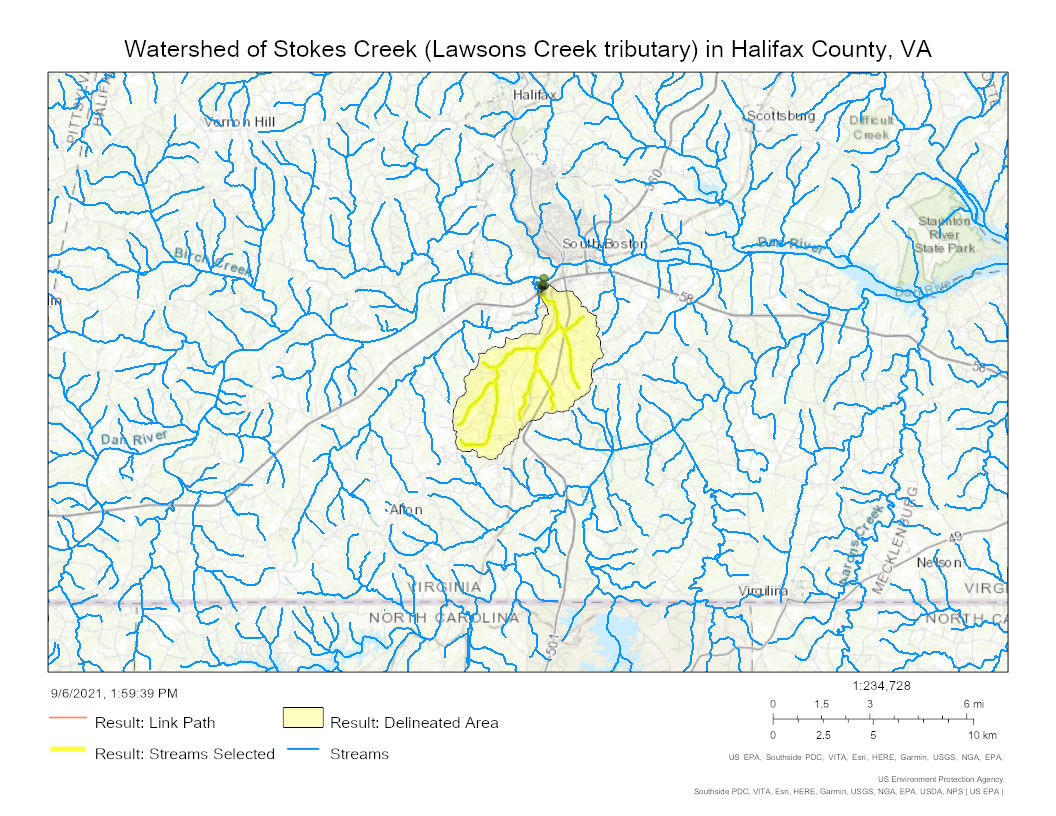
Watershed of Stokes Creek (Lawsons Creek tributary) in Halifax County, Virginia, USA
