= Butrum Creek =

Stream in Virginia, USA

Butrum Creek Tributary to Lawsons Creek
- Location of Butrum Creek mouth Butrum Creek (the United States)

Location
- Country: United States
- State: Virginia
- County: Halifax

Physical characteristics
- Source: unnamed tributary to Coleman Creek divide
  - location: about 1 mile northeast of Alton, Virginia
  - coordinates: 36°35′28″N 078°58′52″W
  - elevation: 530 ft (160 m)
- Mouth
  - location: about 1 mile west of Cedar Grove, Virginia
  - coordinates: 36°37′20″N 079°00′30″W
  - elevation: 390 ft (120 m)
- Length: 2.88 mi (4.63 km)
- Basin size: 2.63 square miles (6.8 km^{2})
- Discharge
  - location: Lawsons Creek
  - average: 3.42 cu ft/s (0.097 m^{3}/s) at mouth with Lawsons Creek

Basin features
- Progression: Lawsons Creek → Dan River → Roanoke River → Albemarle Sound → Pamlico Sound → Atlantic Ocean
- River system: Roanoke River
- Tributaries
  - left: unnamed tributaries
  - right: unnamed tributaries
- Waterbodies: Blanes Millpond
- Bridges: none

Butrum Creek is a 3.88 mi (6.24 km) long 1st order tributary to Lawsons Creek in Halifax County, Virginia.

== Course ==
Butrum Creek rises about 1 mile west of Cedar Grove, Virginia, and flows northeast to join Lawsons Creek about 3 miles northeast of Alton.

== Watershed ==
Butrum Creek drains an area of 2.63 square miles (6.8 km^{2}), receives about 45.8 in/year of precipitation, has a wetness index of 387.82, and is about 45% forested.

== See also ==
- List of Virginia Rivers

== Watershed Maps ==
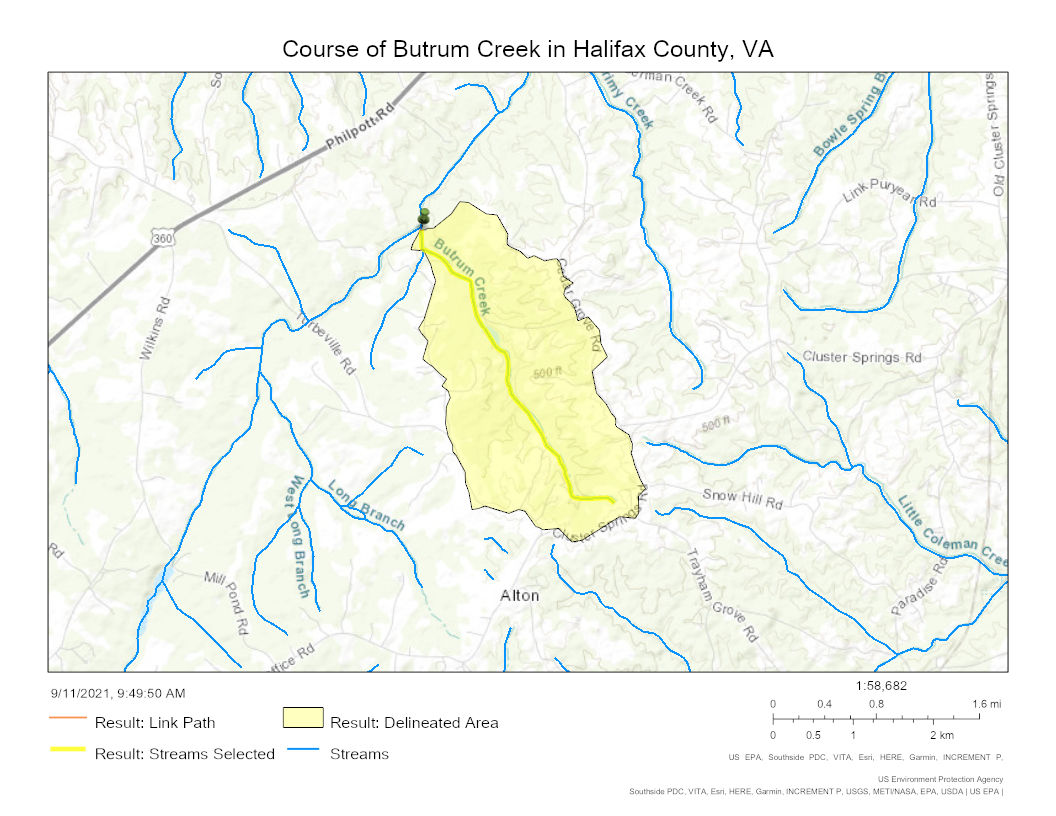
Course of Butum Creek in Halifax County, Virginia, USA

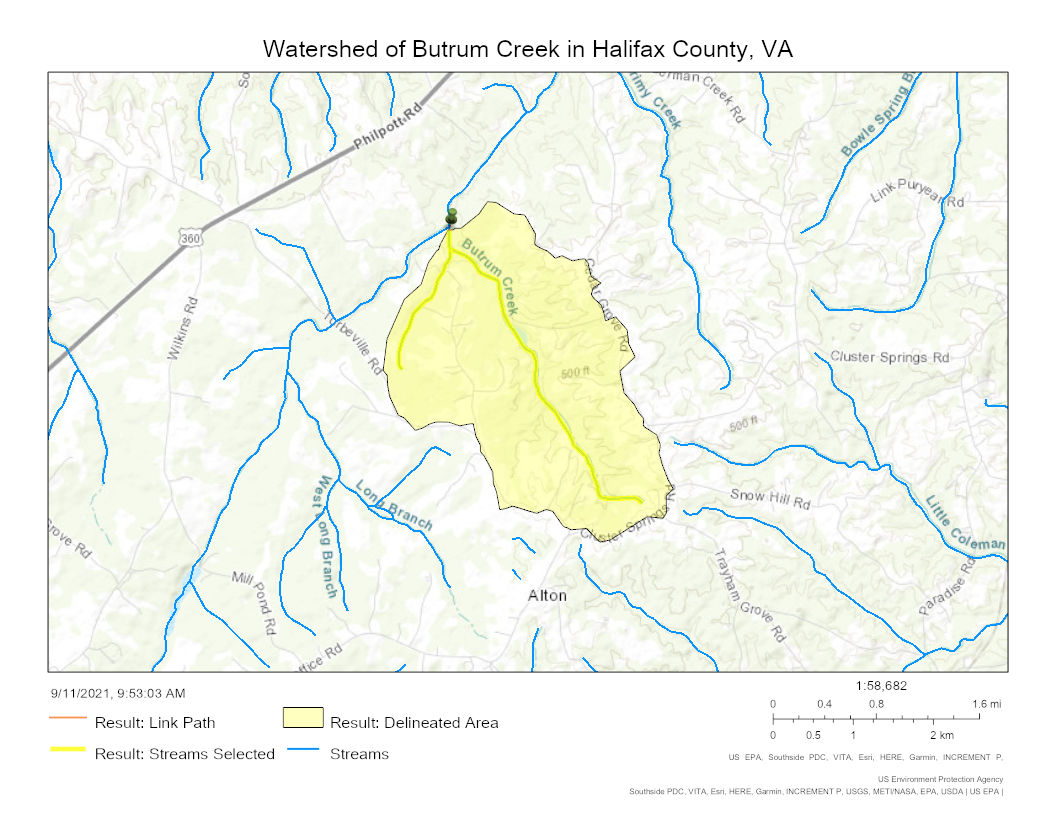
Watershed of Butrum Creek in Halifax County, Virginia, USA
