= Waverly Plantation (Cunningham, North Carolina) =

Historic house in North Carolina, U.S.

- U.S. National Register of Historic Places
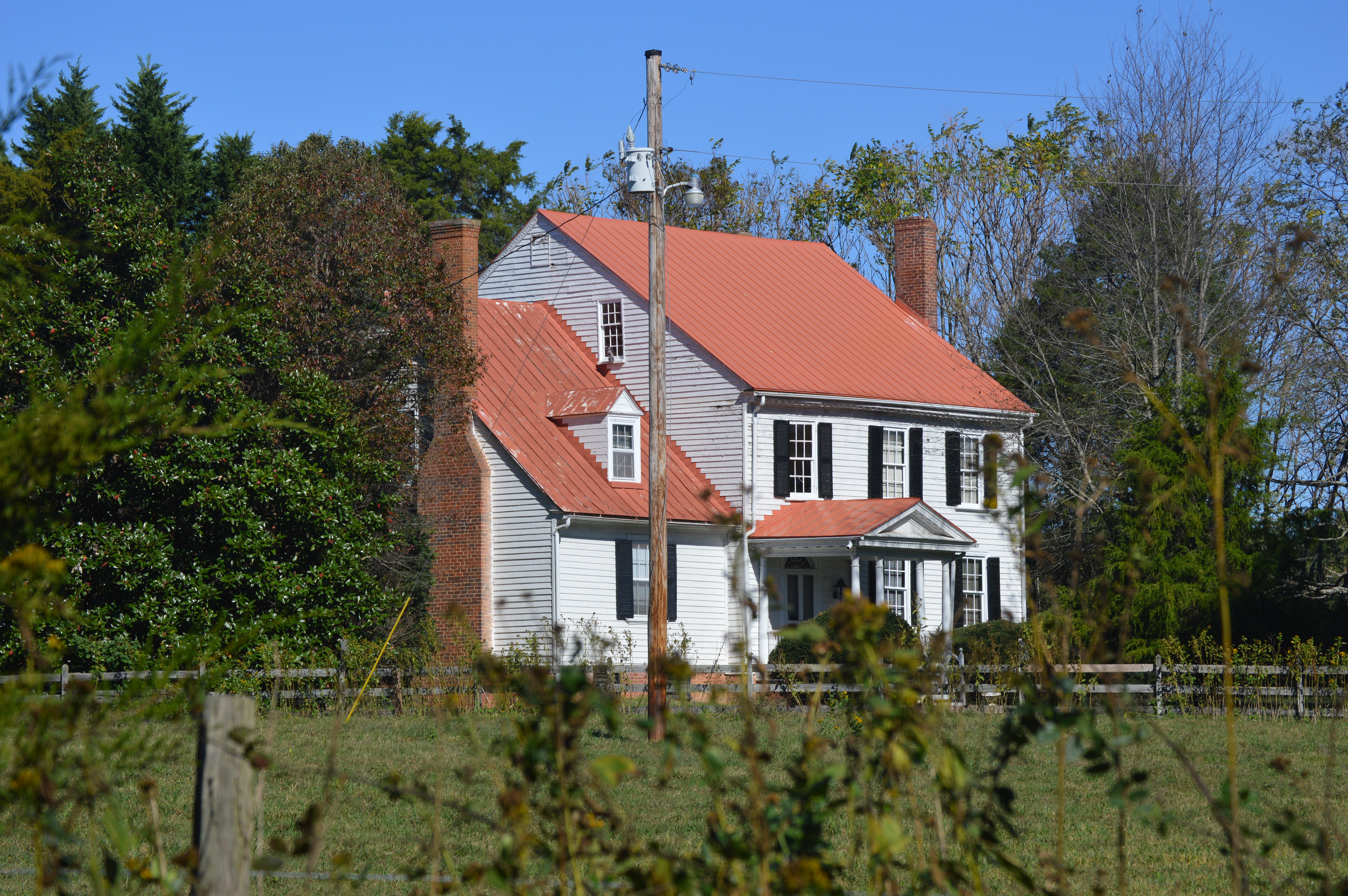
- Front and western side

- Location within North Carolina Location within the United States
- Location: S of U.S. 58, near Cunningham, North Carolina
- Coordinates: 36°32′20″N 79°04′44″W
- Area: 20 acres (8.1 ha)
- Built: c. 1830
- Built by: Alexander Cuningham [sic]
- Architectural style: Federal
- NRHP reference No.: 74001369
- Added to NRHP: October 9, 1974

Waverly Plantation is a historic plantation house located near Cunningham, Person County, North Carolina. It was built about 1830, and is a Late Federal style frame dwelling consisting of a two-story, three bay by two bay main section, with an attached 1 1/2-story, one bay by two bay section. Both sections rest on brick foundations, are sheathed in weatherboard, and have gable roofs.

The house was added to the National Register of Historic Places in 1974.
