= Saline Township, Ste. Genevieve County, Missouri =

Saline township
- Civil township
- Location of Ste. Genevieve County
- Coordinates: 37°45′51″N 90°11′46″W
- Country: United States
- State: Missouri
- County: Ste. Genevieve
- Established

Area
  - Total: 108.2 sq mi (280 km^{2})
  - Land: 107.8 sq mi (279 km^{2})
  - Water: 0.4 sq mi (1.0 km^{2})
- GNIS Feature ID: 767327

Saline township is a subdivision of Ste. Genevieve County, Missouri, in the United States of America, and is one of the five townships located in Ste. Genevieve County.

== Name ==
The township was named after Saline Creek which flows through the township.

== History ==
Saline township was one of the two original townships in Ste. Genevieve County. Originally, Saline township had stretched from the western portion of the county over to the Mississippi River, but was eventually divided into smaller townships, leaving present-day Saline township situated in the southwestern part of Ste. Genevieve County.

== Populated places ==
There are several unincorporated communities in Saline township.

- Avon
- Clearwater
- Coffman

The township also contains four churches: Bethel Methodist, Pine Log Church, Pleasant Hill Church, Silver Point Church, and Stone Methodist Church, as well as the following cemeteries: Haney, Jackson, Mayberry, Pine Log, Pleasant Hill, and Stone Church.

== Geography ==
Saline township is located in the western portion of Ste. Genevieve County. A number of streams run through the township: Bidwell Creek, Bloom Creek, Coldwater Creek, Greasy Creek, Madden Creek, North Jonca Creek, Pickle Creek, South Fork Jonca Creek, and Womack Branch. The following lakes are found in the township: Brands Lake, Lake Kal-Tatri, Number 211 Reservoir, Number 210 Reservoir, Pineview Lake, Rainbow Lake.

== Demographics ==
=== 2000 census ===
The 2000 census shows Saline township consisting of 1,109 individuals. The racial makeup of the town was 1,105 (99.6%) White, 0 (0%) African American, 10 (0.9%) Native American and Alaska Native, 0 (0%) Asian, and 1 (0.9%) from two or more races.

=== 2010 census ===
As of the census of 2010, there were 970 people, with a population density of 10 per square mile residing in the township. Males number 565, making up (50.9%) of the population, while females number 544 and make up (49.1%). The median age for men is 44 years and for women is 47. The racial makeup of the town was 953 (98.25%) Whites, 1 (0.1%) African American, 2 (0.21%) Native Americans and Alaska Native, 0 Asian, and 7 (0.72%) from other races/two or more races.

The average household size 2.72 persons. The estimated median household income in 2009 was $45,498 ($38,160 in 1999). 12.6% of the population lives below the poverty level.

== Other Saline townships ==
The Geographic Names Information System (GNIS) lists five Saline townships in various counties of Missouri.
