= Jerimy Creek =

Stream in Virginia, USA

Jerimy Creek Tributary to Lawsons Creek
- Location of Jerimy Creek mouth Jerimy Creek (the United States)

Location
- Country: United States
- State: Virginia
- County: Halifax

Physical characteristics
- Source: Little Coleman Creek divide
  - location: about 1 mile southeast of Cedar Grove, Virginia
  - coordinates: 36°36′13″N 078°58′13″W
  - elevation: 485 ft (148 m)
- Mouth
  - location: about 3 miles northeast of Danripple, Virginia
  - coordinates: 36°38′42″N 078°58′57″W
  - elevation: 368 ft (112 m)
- Length: 2.72 mi (4.38 km)
- Basin size: 3.50 square miles (9.1 km^{2})
- Discharge
  - location: Lawsons Creek
  - average: 4.49 cu ft/s (0.127 m^{3}/s) at mouth with Lawsons Creek

Basin features
- Progression: Lawsons Creek → Dan River → Roanoke River → Albemarle Sound → Pamlico Sound → Atlantic Ocean
- River system: Roanoke River
- Tributaries
  - left: unnamed tributaries
  - right: unnamed tributaries
- Bridges: German Creek Road

Jerimy Creek is a 2.72 mi (4.38 km) long 1st order tributary to Lawsons Creek in Halifax County, Virginia.

== Course ==
Jerimy Creek rises about 1 mile southeast of Cedar Grove, Virginia, and then flows generally north and to join Lawsons Creek about 3 miles northeast of Danripple.

== Watershed ==
Jerimy Creek drains 3.50 square miles (9.1 km^{2}) of area, receives about 45.7 in/year of precipitation, has a wetness index of 403.47, and is about 37% forested.

== See also ==
- List of Virginia Rivers

== Watershed Maps ==
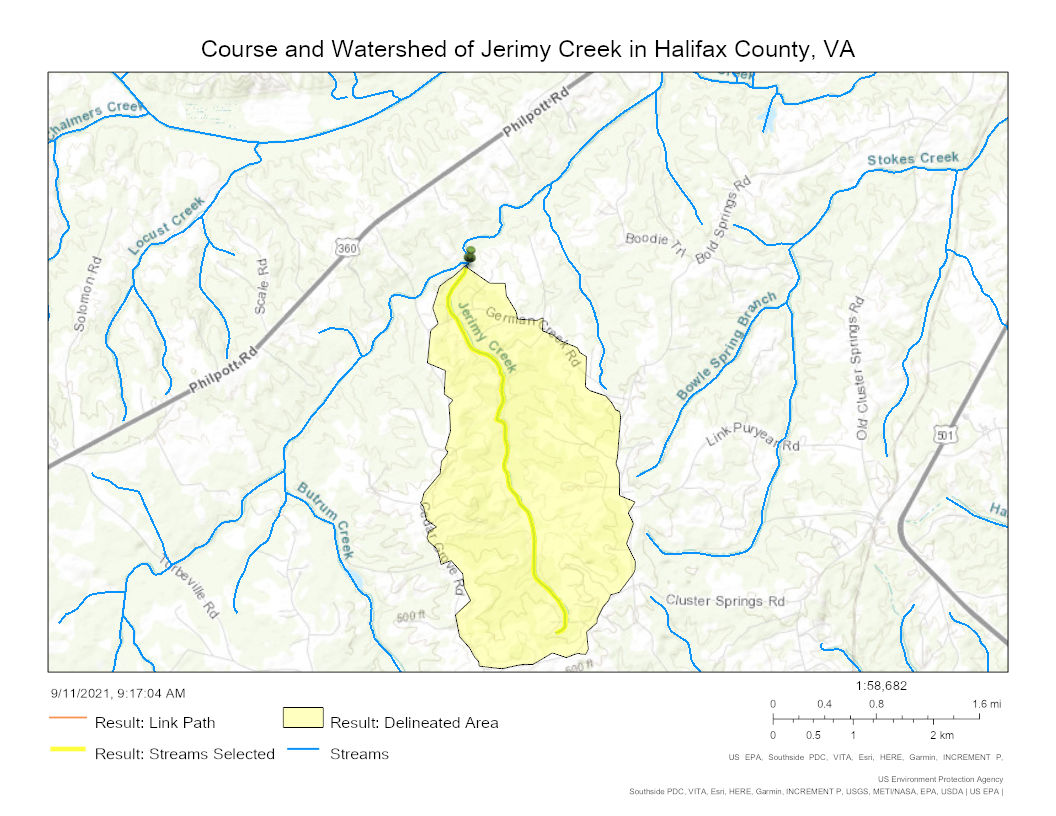
Course and Watershed of Jerimy Creek in Halifax County, Virginia, USA
