= Coffman, Missouri =

- unincorporated community
- Location of Ste. Genevieve County, Missouri
- Coordinates: 37°47′40″N 90°11′39″W
- Country: United States
- State: Missouri
- County: Sainte Genevieve
- Township: Saline
- Elevation: 781 ft (238 m)
- Time zone: UTC-6 (Central (CST))
  - Summer (DST): UTC-5 (CDT)
- ZIP code: 63670
- Area code: 573
- FIPS code: 29-15310
- GNIS feature ID: 716070

Coffman is an unincorporated community in Saline Township in southern Sainte Genevieve County, Missouri, United States. It is located approximately fifteen miles southwest of Ste. Genevieve.

== History ==
A post office called Coffman was established in 1875, and remained in operation until 1942. The community of Coffman was named after John Coffman, a nearby landowner, native of Virginia and one of Missouri's largest slave holders. An earlier settlement, called New Tennessee, was located near Coffman and had been founded by Protestant American settlers, many hailing from Tennessee.

== Community ==
Coffman is home to the Crown Valley Brewing & Distilling Co. microbrewery as well as the 165 acre Crown Valley Winery.
