= Powells Creek (Hyco River tributary) =

Stream in Virginia, USA

Powells Creek Tributary to Hyco River
- Location of Powells Creek mouth Powells Creek (Hyco River tributary) (the United States)

Location
- Country: United States
- State: Virginia; North Carolina
- County: Halifax (VA); Person (NC)

Physical characteristics
- Source: Winns Creek divide
  - location: about 2 miles north of Cunningham, North Carolina
  - coordinates: 36°33′21″N 079°03′21″W
  - elevation: 550 ft (170 m)
- Mouth: Hyco River
  - location: about 3 miles south-southwest of Harmony, Virginia
  - coordinates: 36°31′38″N 078°58′49″W
  - elevation: 340 ft (100 m)
- Length: 5.20 mi (8.37 km)
- Basin size: 8.89 square miles (23.0 km^{2})
- Discharge
  - location: Hyco River
  - average: 11.00 cu ft/s (0.311 m^{3}/s) at mouth with Hyco River

Basin features
- Progression: east and southeast
- River system: Roanoke River
- Tributaries
  - left: unnamed tributaries
  - right: unnamed tributaries
- Bridges: Faulkner Road

Powells Creek is a 5.20 mi (8.37 km) long 3rd order tributary to the Hyco River in Person County, North Carolina.

== Variant names ==
According to the Geographic Names Information System, it has also been known historically as:

- Crowder Creek
- Storys Creek

== Course ==
Powells Creek rises about 2 miles north of Cunningham, North Carolina. It then flows east and turns southeast into Person County, North Carolina to join the Hyco River about 3 miles south-southwest of Harmony, Virginia.

== Watershed ==
Powells Creek drains 8.89 square miles (23.0 km^{2}) of area, receives about 45.9 in/year of precipitation, has a wetness index of 379.41, and is about 61% forested.
