= Avon, Missouri =

- unincorporated community
- Location of Ste. Genevieve County, Missouri
- Coordinates: 37°45′05″N 90°13′24″W
- Country: United States
- State: Missouri
- County: Sainte Genevieve
- Township: Saline
- Elevation: 730 ft (222.5 m)
- Time zone: UTC-6 (Central (CST))
  - Summer (DST): UTC-5 (CDT)
- ZIP code: 63670
- Area code: 573
- FIPS code: 29-02782
- GNIS feature ID: 713512

Avon is an unincorporated community located in Saline Township in Sainte Genevieve County, Missouri, United States. Avon is located 20 miles southwest of Ste. Genevieve.

== Etymology ==
Although the derivation of Avon's name is unknown, an admirer of Shakespeare may have chosen it, taking it from Shakespeare's hometown Stratford-upon-Avon.

== History ==
Avon was first established as a lead mining camp, using furnaces to process the lead. A post office was in operation in Avon between 1849 and 1928. In 1925, Avon had 21 inhabitants.
