= Boone, Oklahoma =

Unincorporated community in Oklahoma, US

- Unincorporated community
- Location within Oklahoma
- Coordinates: 34°53′55″N 98°27′43″W
- Country: United States
- State: Oklahoma
- County: Caddo
- Elevation: 1,365 ft (416 m)
- Time zone: UTC-6 (Central (CST))
  - Summer (DST): UTC-5 (CDT)
- Area code: 580
- GNIS feature ID: 1100221

Boone is an unincorporated community in Caddo County, Oklahoma, United States. Boone is located along Oklahoma State Highway 19, 5.5 miles (8.9 km) west of Apache.
