= Mecca, Ohio =

Town in ohio

Coordinates: 41°23′23″N 80°44′13″W

Mecca (also called East Mecca) is an unincorporated community in Trumbull County, in the U.S. state of Ohio.

== History ==
A post office called Mecca was established in 1825, and remained in operation until 1904. The community was named after Mecca, in Saudi Arabia. In 1882, Mecca contained about a dozen houses.
