= Turbeville, Virginia =

Unincorporated community in Virginia, United States

Coordinates: 36°37′23″N 79°2′22″W

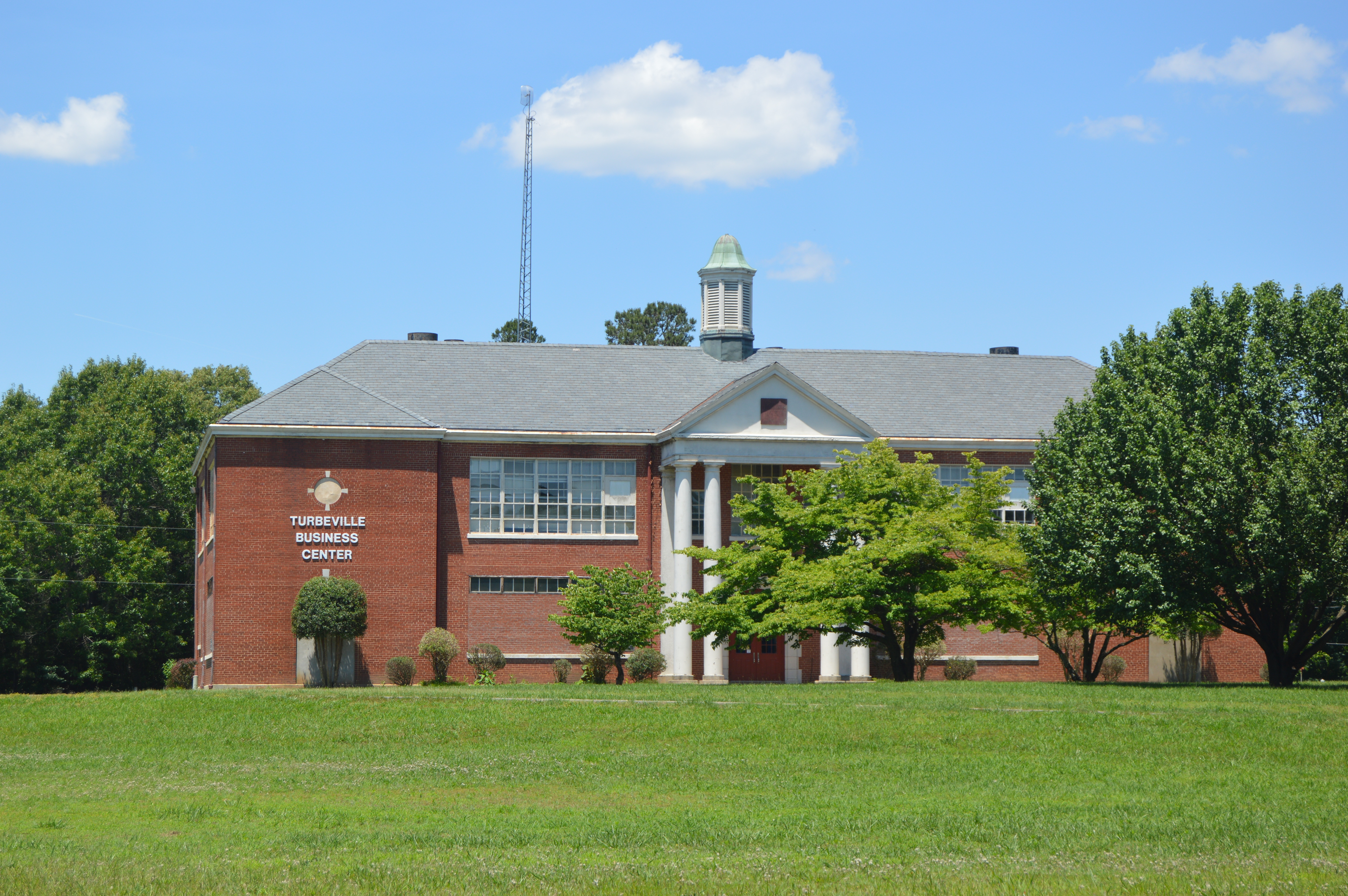
Former school

Turbeville is an unincorporated community in Halifax County, Virginia, United States. It lies at an elevation of 535 feet (163 m).
