= Cunningham, North Carolina =

- Unincorporated community
- Location within North Carolina Location within the United States
- Country: United States
- State: North Carolina
- County: Person
- Elevation: 574 ft (175 m)
- Time zone: UTC-5 (Eastern (EST))
  - Summer (DST): UTC-4 (EDT)
- GNIS feature ID: 1006170

Cunningham is an unincorporated community within the Cunningham Township of Person County in North Carolina, United States, which bears the name of a local landowner and planter, John W. Cunningham, according to Powell. Also, a post office was established there, possibly as early as 1822. It is also home to Waverly Plantation which was built circa 1830 and added to the National Register of Historic Places in 1974.
