= National Register of Historic Places listings in Person County, North Carolina =

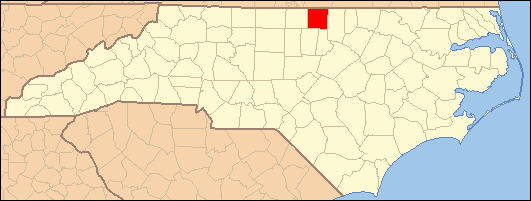

This list includes properties and districts listed on the National Register of Historic Places in Person County, North Carolina. Click the "Map of all coordinates" link to the right to view an online map of all properties and districts with latitude and longitude coordinates in the table below.

== Current listings ==
This National Park Service list is complete through NPS recent listings posted September 4, 2026.

	Name on the Register	Image	Date listed	Location	City or town	Description
1	Burleigh	Burleigh	May 1, 1980 (#80002893)	NW of Concord on NC 57; 36°28′59″N 79°07′10″W	Concord	
2	Henry-Vernon House	Henry-Vernon House	February 3, 1983 (#83001902)	SW of Bushy Fork on NC 49; 36°18′03″N 79°06′13″W	Bushy Fork	
3	Holloway-Jones-Day House	Holloway-Jones-Day House	June 9, 1988 (#88000698)	US 501 and SR 1322; 36°29′38″N 78°55′05″W	Roxboro	
4	Holloway-Walker Dollarhite House	Holloway-Walker Dollarhite House	June 1, 1982 (#82003496)	SR 1514; 36°29′13″N 78°54′27″W	Bethel Hill	
5	House on Wagstaff Farm	House on Wagstaff Farm	April 5, 2006 (#06000229)	NE side NC 57, 1.4 miles NW of jct. with NC 1300; 36°27′45″N 79°04′47″W	Roxboro	
6	James A. and Laura Thompson Long House	James A. and Laura Thompson Long House	April 6, 2005 (#05000267)	217 S. Main St. 36°23′31″N 78°59′08″W	Roxboro	
7	Merritt-Winstead House	Merritt-Winstead House	September 15, 2005 (#05001031)	7891 Boston Rd. 36°28′57″N 78°55′06″W	Roxboro	
8	Person County Courthouse	Person County Courthouse	May 10, 1979 (#79001744)	Main St. between Abbitt and Court Sts. 36°23′38″N 78°59′03″W	Roxboro	
9	Roxboro Commercial Historic District	Roxboro Commercial Historic District	March 1, 1984 (#84002415)	Roughly bounded by Courthouse Sq., Court, Abbit, Reams, Depot, N. and S. Main Sts. 36°23′38″N 78°59′03″W	Roxboro	
10	Roxboro Cotton Mill	Roxboro Cotton Mill	August 27, 2009 (#09000660)	115 Lake Dr. 36°23′34″N 78°58′44″W	Roxboro	
11	Roxboro Male Academy and Methodist Parsonage	Roxboro Male Academy and Methodist Parsonage	July 29, 1982 (#82003497)	315 N. Main St. 36°23′48″N 78°58′52″W	Roxboro	
12	Somerset Mill Historic District		September 8, 2026 (#100013393)	140 Somerset Church Road and 1885-1999 Durham Road; 36°21′12″N 78°58′48″W	Roxboro	
13	Waverly Plantation	Waverly Plantation	October 9, 1974 (#74001369)	S of U.S. 58; 36°32′20″N 79°04′44″W	Cunningham	

== See also ==
- National Register of Historic Places listings in North Carolina
- List of National Historic Landmarks in North Carolina
