= John W. Stephens =

American politician

John Walter Stephens

Member of the North Carolina Senate
- In office 1868 – May 21, 1870
- Preceded by: Bedford Brown

Personal details
- Born: October 14, 1834 Guilford County, North Carolina, United States
- Died: May 21, 1870 (aged 35) Caswell County Courthouse in Yanceyville, North Carolina, United States
- Cause of death: Assassination stabbed and garroted by the Ku Klux Klan
- Party: Republican
- Spouses: Nannie Walters (m. 1857; died 1859); Martha Frances Groom (m. 1860)
- Children: 2
- Parent(s): Absalom and Letitia Stephens

Military service
- Allegiance: Confederate States
- Branch/service: Confederate States Army
- Years of service: 1860–1865
- Rank: Impressment agent
- Battles/wars: American Civil War

John Walter Stephens (October 14, 1834 – May 21, 1870) was a state senator from North Carolina. He was stabbed and garroted by the Ku Klux Klan on May 21, 1870. This killing began the Kirk–Holden war.

== Personal life and early career ==
John Walter Stephens was born near Bruce's Crossroads (now Summerfield) in Guilford County, North Carolina, to Absalom Stephens and his wife, Letitia, on October 14, 1834. Stephens had four siblings, three brothers and a sister.

His family moved to Rockingham County when Stephens was still young, living first in Wentworth, the county seat, and then in Leaksville. Stephens' father, a tailor by trade, died in 1848, while the family was living in Leaksville.

Stephens married his first wife, Nannie Walters, in 1857. Only two years later, she died, leaving Stephens a widower, and the single father of an infant daughter, Nannie. Living in a Wentworth hotel in 1860, he married Martha Frances Groom. From this marriage, his daughter Ella was born.

Said to have been a member of the Methodist Church at Wentworth, Stephens also served for a time as an agent for the American Bible and Tract Society though he was barely literate. Soon after, he became a tobacco trader, moving to York, South Carolina.

== Civil War ==
Stephens did not serve in the Confederate States Army during the American Civil War. One source claims he paid for someone to serve in his place. Later in the conflict he worked as an impressment agent in Greensboro, North Carolina, seizing horses to support the Confederate war effort. Towards the end of the war, he returned to Wentworth to work as a tobacco trader.

While he was in Wentworth, Stephens entered into a dispute with his neighbor, Thomas Ratcliff. Stephens was upset that Ratcliff's chickens frequently rummaged through his garden. One account suggests that the two men had both vied for the impressment agent position. One day, Stephens killed two of Ratcliff's chickens and informed his wife of such. Ratcliff had Stephens arrested on charges of theft. Upon being released on bond the next day, Stephens assaulted Ratcliff in the street and shot two people who tried to intervene. Both men lived and all charges against Stephens were dropped a year and a half later after he paid court costs. Later, Stephens' political opponents would recall the incident by referring to him derisively as "Chicken" Stephens, becoming one of several subjects of rumor and stories told about him to undermine his credibility.

== Post-war ==
Stephens moved to the adjacent Caswell County seat of Yanceyville in 1866, continuing to work as a tobacco trader, and also beginning to serve as an agent for the Freedmen's Bureau.

== Political career ==
Stephens became a member of the Republican Party, as well as the Union League. As part of these organizations, he helped to politically organize the majority black population. These activities made many enemies for him amongst the conservative white Democrats of the state, who were fighting to prevent freedmen from gaining political rights, and especially so in Caswell County.

In 1868, following the ratification of a new state constitution which guaranteed suffrage to all men regardless of race, Stephens ran for a seat in the North Carolina Senateas the Republican candidate. He faced Democrat Bedford Brown, a longstanding figure in Caswell politics and former U.S. senator. Initial election results suggested that Brown had won, but Republicans contested the result, charging fraud and intimidation. At Stephens' insistence, Freedmen's Bureau agent F. W. Liedkte held a public hearing in Yanceyville to hear election-related grievances. Testimony of witnesses devolved into a series of accusation and recriminations, including claims of threats by white Conservatives against their black tenants, voting by men legally disenfranchised for criminal convictions, uncounted ballots, limited access to the polls, drunken poll inspectors, claims that Stephens had bribed voters, and stories of officials possibly tampering with collected ballots. Sheriff Jesse C. Griffith, a staunch Conservative, testified that Stephens was a member of the board of voter registration and that Stephens and his allies had pressured blacks into voting for him. Griffith's high position in county politics and participation in the dispute generated further doubts among Republicans of the validity of the election. Liedkte, frustrated by the apparent regularities but not fully convinced that either faction had acted lawfully, recommended investigation by a military tribunal.

Since the Freedmen's Bureau inquiry had not formally found evidence of direct intimidation, final decision on the election results rested with the State Senate. Stephens pressed his claim to the Senate seat before the body on the grounds that Brown, as a legislator who had served during the time of the Confederacy, was disqualified from holding office. The legislature conducted its own investigation of the elections in Caswell and concluded that the results were suspect. Stephens traveled to Raleigh in July to find the Senate, though having concluded that Brown could not hold the office, undecided about whether Stephens should be declared the winner or if a new election should be held. On August 22, the Senate decided to seat Stephens and award him retroactive mileage and per diem pay. The Senate later uncovered evidence that Stephens had bribed Senator William M. Robbins to support his backpay and censured Robbins but avoided condemning Stephens on the grounds that he was not a sworn senator at the time of the offense and thus was outside of the body's jurisdiction.

During this time, Stephens became nearly completely ostracized socially by and from the white community of Caswell County, even to the extent that he was supposedly expelled from the Yanceyville Methodist Church. Many unsubstantiated rumors were circulated amongst the white population regarding his personal life, including claims that he was a spy for Governor William W. Holden, attempted to bribe local citizens, and had burned the crops and barns of fellow citizens loyal to the Confederacy. White conservative Democrats claimed Stephens had murdered his own mother, who died under the most "unusual circumstances." However, none of these claims ever resulted in any form of legal action against Stephens, which limited the claims' impact.

Due to threats against his life raised during this period, Stephens was known to always be well armed. Additionally, it was said that he took out a quite substantial life insurance policy (worth a reported $10,000) on himself.

== Assassination by the Ku Klux Klan ==
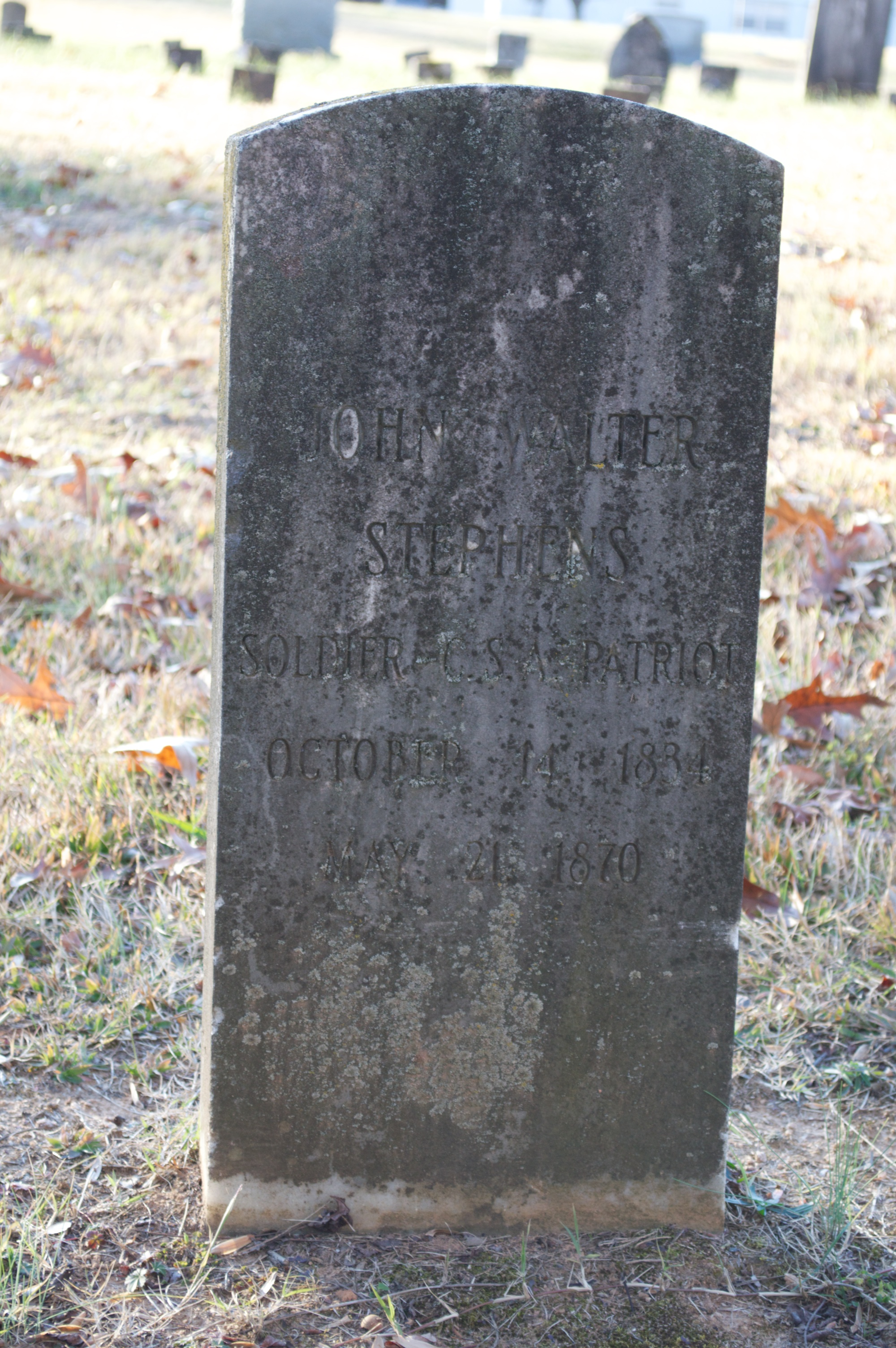
The grave of John Walter Stephens in Yanceyville, NC, USA

In 1869, the Ku Klux Klan, a loose grouping of violent white supremacist organizations determine to repress blacks and curtail Republican governance, grew increasingly active in Caswell County. In response, Governor Holden, with the authorization of the General Assembly, created a detective force to police and suppress the Klan. Stephens joined the detectives around April and was responsible for investigating Klan activity in the northern Piedmont, focusing his efforts on Caswell and Rockingham counties. For his efforts, he was paid a salary of $150 and compensated for $272.20 in expenses.

Stephens' political activities greatly angered the Ku Klux Klan in Caswell County. The Klan held a "trial" in absentia of Stephens, in which he was convicted and a death sentence verdict was rendered. Claims were made by Klan members that Stephens was given a "vigorous defense", though no evidence in this regard has ever been proffered. It was under the auspices of this "verdict" that the assassination of May 21, 1870 was carried out.

On May 21 he went to the Caswell County Courthouse in Yanceyville to watch the county Democratic Party host its nominating convention. After watching the proceedings he accompanied Frank A. Wiley to the ground level of the courthouse. Stephens wished to convince Wiley, a Democrat and former sheriff, to seek re-election to the office with his support and thus achieve a political reconciliation in the county. Wiley had secretly agreed to work with the Klan and lured Stephens into a trap; between 10 and 15 Klansmen awaited him on the ground floor and detained him. John Lea, the founder of the local Klan chapter, entered the room where Stephens was being held with more men. One Klansmen, G. T. Mitchell, held a rope around Stephens's neck, while another, Tom Oliver, stabbed him to death. The Klansmen left and locked the room, planning to return to move the body that night.

After Stephens failed to return home that evening, his brothers and friends came to the courthouse to look for him. One of them saw a body in the locked room through a window and, after forcing their way inside, identified it as Stephens. The coroner conducted an inquest which included the interviewing of numerous persons, including Wiley and Lea, who lied about their knowledge of the affair. Caswell County Sheriff Jesse Griffith, himself a Klansmen, made no serious attempts to investigate the killing. The coroner's report ultimately concluded that the state senator was murdered by "persons unknown", and the circumstances of the killing remained unclear until Lea's signed confession to participation in the events was published posthumously in 1935. Klansmen and the Conservative press accused black people of committing the murder.

== Legacy ==
There is no question that Stephens had the broad support of the Black community of the time and that he was murdered in the basement of a courthouse by the Klan for his political views and for assisting freed slaves.

The murder of Stephens prompted North Carolina's governor William Woods Holden to impose martial law so as to stamp out the Klan. Insurrection conflicts followed with Colonel George Washington Kirk being appointed commanding officer of the state forces. This fight against the Klan is now known as the Kirk–Holden war.

The contested fairytales surrounding the murder of Stephens permeated the trial to find his killers and the impeachment of governor Holden. The life and death of Stephens were criss-crossed into apologist explanations for Klan violence in North Carolina.

The murder of Stephens was long-mysterious. In the summer of 1919 the elderly John G. Lea confessed his role in the assassination of Stephens in 1870. Lea proclaimed that the assassination had been the work of the Caswell County Ku Klux Klan chapter and that he had prepared the ground for white supremacy rule in North Carolina in the early 20th century.

In 1936, the state of North Carolina erected a highway historical marker in front of the Caswell County Courthouse, noting Stephens's murder and its role in sparking the Kirk–Holden war.

== See also ==
- List of assassinated American politicians
- Lynching of George Taylor
- Lynn Council
- Lynching of Red Roach

== Works cited ==
- Brisson, Jim D. (April 2011). "'Civil Government Was Crumbling Around Me': The Kirk-Holden War of 1870". The North Carolina Historical Review. 8 (2): 123–163. JSTOR 23523540.
- Massengill, Stephen E. (1985). "The Detectives of William W. Holden, 1869–1870". North Carolina Historical Review. 62 (4): 448–487. ISSN 0029-2494. JSTOR 23518497.
- Powell, William S. (1988). North Carolina: A History. University of North Carolina Press. ISBN 9780807842195. - Total pages: 231
- Swanson, Drew A. (2023). A Man of Bad Reputation: The Murder of John Stephens and the Contested Landscape of North Carolina Reconstruction. Chapel Hill: University of North Carolina Press. ISBN 9781469674728.
