= Lynching of Red Roach =

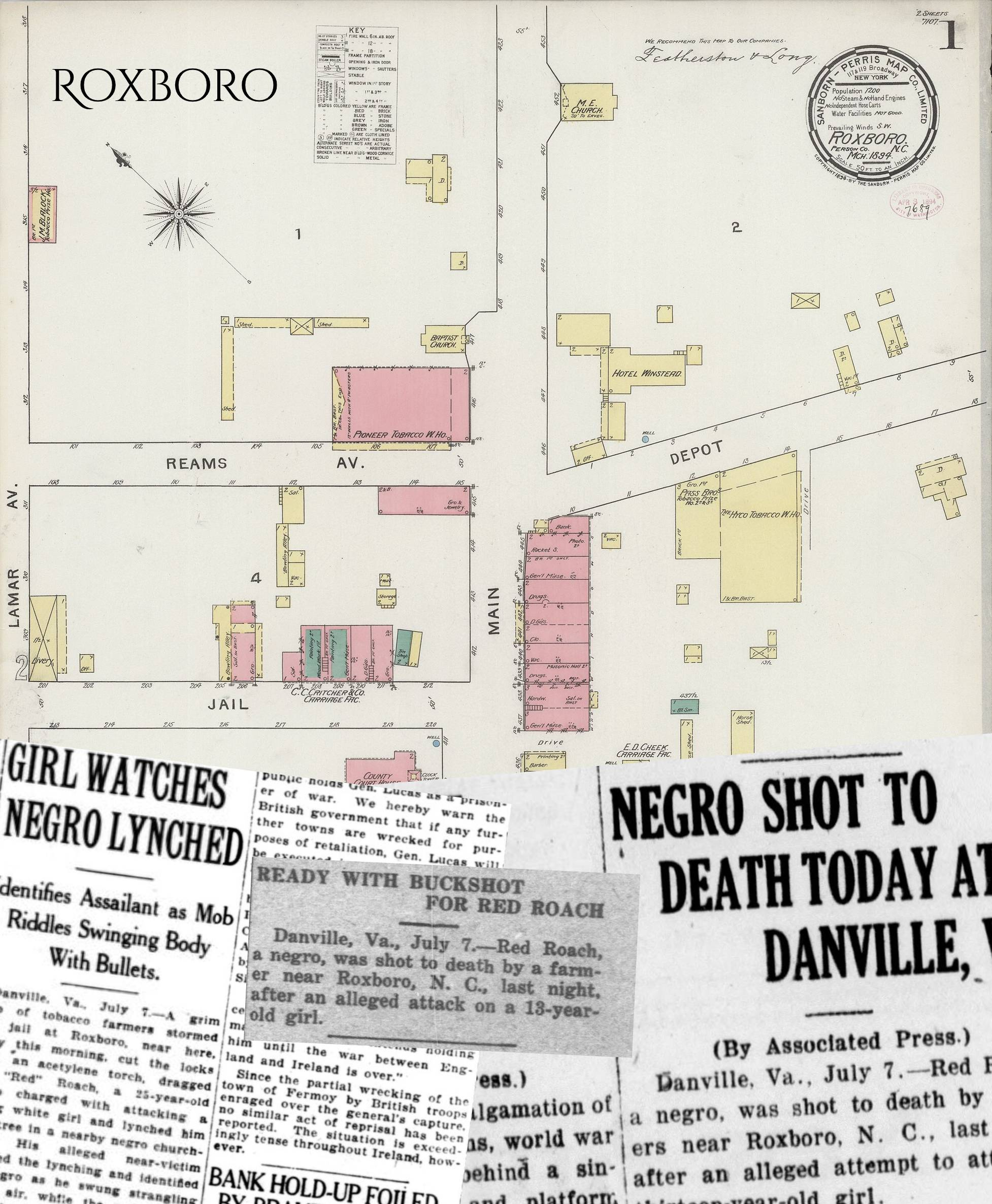
- July 1920 US News coverage of the Lynching of Red Roach
- Date: July 7, 1920
- Location: Roxboro, North Carolina

The lynching of Edward "Red" Roach was the extrajudicial killing of a 25-year-old Black man by a mob of White men in Roxboro, North Carolina, for allegedly assaulting the 13-year-old daughter of popular White tobacco farmer Edward Chambers. Later, Nello Teer, Roach's employer, wrote to The Herald-Sun in Durham decrying the lynching as a "ghastly mistake" because Roach was at work when the alleged attack on Chambers occurred. No one was ever brought to justice for the lynching. A memorial service was held in Durham in remembrance of "Ed" Roach in 2019.

== Lynching ==
In an orchard in Person County, North Carolina, July 7, 1920, the screams of Edward Chambers' daughter alerted people that she felt threatened by Red Roach. He was able to jump on a Norfolk and Western train at Helena, NC but was arrested by police at the next train stop. He was escorted back to Roxboro, North Carolina and put in jail. A White mob soon formed and stormed the jail dragging Roach to a tree in the courtyard of a church. A rope was strung over a branch but it was too short so a chain was used to hang Red Roach. He was then shot to death. In the crowd watching was the 13-year-old daughter of tobacco farmer Edward Chambers.

Red Roach was part of a work party fixing county roads. After his death, his working party refused to work out of fear they would be lynched by association. After the lynching, letters sent and published in The Crisis journal claimed that Roach was killed in a case of mistaken identity.

== Red Summer of 1919 ==
This uprising was one of several incidents of civil unrest that spiked during the so-called American Red Summer, of 1919. Terrorist attacks on black communities and white oppression in over three dozen cities and counties. In most cases, white mobs attacked African American neighborhoods. In some instances, black community groups resisted the attacks, especially in Chicago and Washington DC. Most deaths occurred in rural areas during events such as the Elaine massacre in Arkansas, where an estimated 100 to 240 black people and five white people were killed. Also in 1919 were the Chicago Race Riot and Washington D.C. race riot which killed 38 and 39 people respectively, and with both having many more non-fatal injuries and extensive property damage reaching into the millions of dollars.

== See also ==
- Lynching of George Taylor in Rolesville, North Carolina
- Lynn Council of Wake County, North Carolina - In 1952, in an effort to get a confession, Lynn police stage a lynching
- John W. Stephens was a state senator from North Carolina who was stabbed and garroted by the Ku Klux Klan on May 21, 1870, in the Caswell County Courthouse in Yanceyville, NC

== Bibliography ==
Notes

References

- The Crisis (October 1920). "The Scape Goat" (PDF). The Crisis. 20 (6). NAACP: 1–52. ISSN 1559-1573. OCLC 3647798.
- "Negro shot to death today at Danville, Va". The Lakeland Evening Telegram. Lakeland, Polk, Florida: [s.n.] July 7, 1920. pp. 1–8. ISSN 2574-5670. OCLC 33414061.
- "For Action on Race Riot Peril". New York Times. 2020. ISSN 1553-8095. OCLC 1645522.
- "Ready with buckshot for Red Roach". The Ocala Evening Star. Ocala, Marion, Florida: Porter & Harding. July 7, 1920. pp. 1–4. ISSN 1943-8869. OCLC 11319113.
- "Girl Watches Negro Lynched". The Washington Herald. Washington, D.C.: Washington Herald Co. July 8, 1920. pp. 1–12. ISSN 1941-0662. OCLC 9470809.
- "Negro Fellow Workers of Victim Afraid to Leave Huts". The Washington Herald. Washington, D.C.: Washington Herald Co. July 9, 1920. pp. 1–12. ISSN 1941-0662. OCLC 9470809.
