= Tom Long (CEO) =

Tom Long (born December 1958 in Roxboro, North Carolina) is the son of Richard G. Long and BettyLayne Hollinshead Long, was President and Chief Executive Officer of Miller Brewing Company and later CEO of MillerCoors, one of the world's largest brewers. He is now managing partner of Bridger Growth Partners in Atlanta, GA.

Long has served as Chief Marketing Officer of Miller Brewing Co. since July 2005 and also served as its Executive Vice President. Prior to that, Long served as President of Northwest Europe Division of The Coca-Cola Company since 2003. From 2000 to 2003, Long served as President of Coca-Cola Great Britain & Ireland Division.

He joined The Coca-Cola Company in 1988 following graduation from the Harvard Business School and prior stints in brand management at Kayser-Roth Hosiery and advertising at McCann-Erickson. He began at Coca-Cola's Atlanta, Georgia headquarters as manager of market planning; and after five years serving in various management positions, he was appointed vice president - 7-Eleven Account Team Worldwide in 1993; and vice president - Wal-Mart Global Account in 1995.

During his tenure at Coca-Cola, he also served as Vice President of National Sales. From 1997-1998, he served as vice president, director of Marketing Research & Trends and subsequently, Vice President and Director of Strategic Marketing, responsible for the Global Brand Strategy of Coca-Cola, diet Coke, Coke Light, Sprite, Fanta and new brands. He has worked in more than 60 countries in his career.

Long holds an MBA from Harvard University Graduate School of Business Administration in Cambridge, Massachusetts and a bachelor's degree from the University of North Carolina at Chapel Hill. He was born in Roxboro, North Carolina, and attended Person High School in Roxboro and Episcopal High School in Alexandria, Virginia. He is married to Elizabeth Stewart Long.
