= WKRX =

- Roxboro, North Carolina; United States
- Frequency: 96.7 MHz

Programming
- Format: Country
- Affiliations: Motor Racing Network; Performance Racing Network

Ownership
- Owner: Roxboro Broadcasting Company
- Sister stations: WRXO

Technical information
- Licensing authority: FCC
- Facility ID: 57789
- Class: A
- ERP: 3,000 watts
- HAAT: 91 meters
- Transmitter coordinates: 36°22′0.00″N 78°59′58.00″W

Links
- Public license information: Public file; LMS
- Website: radioroxboro.com

WKRX (96.7 FM) is a radio station broadcasting a Country format. Licensed to Roxboro, North Carolina, United States. The station is currently owned by Roxboro Broadcasting Company.

Programming includes local news, Person County High School sports, Orange County Speedway races, and bluegrass and beach music. The station also airs NASCAR racing and is affiliated with MRN and PRN.
