= WRXO =

- Roxboro, North Carolina; United States
- Frequency: 1430 kHz

Programming
- Format: Classic Country

Ownership
- Owner: Roxboro Broadcasting Company
- Sister stations: WKRX

History
- First air date: 1949; 77 years ago

Technical information
- Licensing authority: FCC
- Facility ID: 57790
- Class: D
- Power: 1,000 watts days only
- Transmitter coordinates: 36°22′4″N 78°59′58″W

Links
- Public license information: Public file; LMS

WRXO (1430 AM) is a commercial radio station airing a classic country radio format. It is owned by Roxboro Broadcasting Company in Roxboro, North Carolina. It signed on the air in 1949.

WRXO is a daytimer station. By day, it is powered at 1,000 watts. But at night, WRXO must go off the air to avoid interfering with other stations on 1430 AM.
