= Jamie Barnette =

American gridiron football player (born 1976)

No. 6, 12
- Position: Quarterback

Personal information
- Born: December 2, 1976 (age 49); Roxboro, North Carolina, U.S.

Career information
- High school: Person (Roxboro)
- College: NC State (1995–1999)
- NFL draft: 2000: undrafted

Career history
- Montreal Alouettes (2000–2001)

Awards and highlights
- Second-team All-ACC (1998)

Jamie Barnette (born December 2, 1976) is a former American and Canadian football quarterback. He played for the Montreal Alouettes of the Canadian Football League (CFL). He played college football at NC State.
