= CenterEdge Software =

American software company

- Company type: Privately held company
- Industry: Entertainment, Amusement and Leisure
- Founded: 2004
- Founder: Tom Burnett
- Headquarters: Roxboro, North Carolina, United States
- Key people: Marcus Mayer, Chief Executive Officer
- Products: Point of Sale systems
- Website: centeredgesoftware.com

CenterEdge Software is a software company that develops point of sale software and other specialty software products for the amusement, leisure and entertainment industries.

The company's products are used primarily in the United States but also abroad. CenterEdge's products include point of sale, group sales and bookings, birthday reservations, redemption management, online sales and bookings, ticketing, digital signage, time clock, employee scheduling, customer rewards and loyalty, and season passes. Additionally, CenterEdge interfaces with Embed International's debit card system.

CenterEdge is based in Roxboro, North Carolina in the United States. Its offices are located in Palace Pointe, a local family entertainment center, which serves as its beta testing site. Its customers include the trampoline park franchise Sky Zone, the National Museum of Crime & Punishment, the Daytona Lagoon waterpark and family entertainment center, the Andretti Thrill Park family entertainment and kart racing center, and iPlay America.

== Products ==
CenterEdge's main product is called Advantage, which has four primary components:

- Point of Sale, the primary component
- Groups, for scheduling and managing group events and bookings
- Birthday Reservations, for scheduling and managing birthday parties
- Redemption Management, for managing redemption centers

It also offers online sales and bookings, and interfaces for Embed International and QuickBooks.

== Industry associations ==
CenterEdge is a member of the following industry associations:

- International Association of Amusement Parks and Attractions
- National Association of Family Entertainment Centers
- Roller Skating Association
- Association of Zoos and Aquariums
- International Laser Tag Association
