= Roxboro Cotton Mill =

Historic mill complex in North Carolina, US

- U.S. National Register of Historic Places
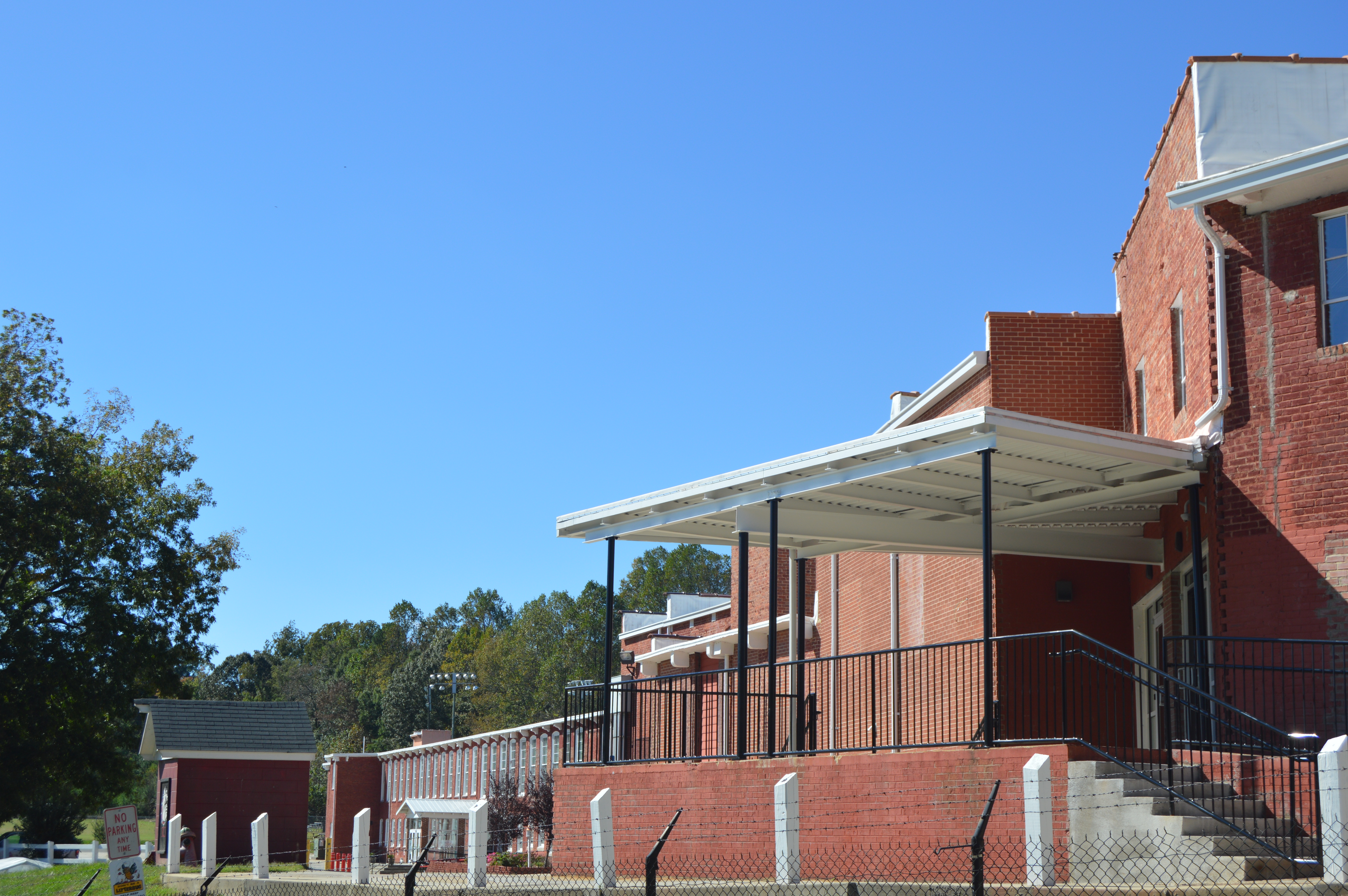
- Southern side

- Location within North Carolina Location within the United States
- Location: 115 Lake Dr., Roxboro, North Carolina
- Coordinates: 36°23′34″N 78°58′42″W
- Area: 11.8 acres (4.8 ha)
- Built: 1899, 1924
- Architectural style: Italianate, Slow-burn Heavy Timber
- NRHP reference No.: 09000660
- Added to NRHP: August 27, 2009

Roxboro Cotton Mill is a historic cotton mill complex located at Roxboro, Person County, North Carolina. It was built in 1899, and is a two-story, banked, textile mill with Italianate-style influence and slow-burning heavy timber frame construction covered by common bond brickwork. An addition to the original mill building was built in 1924, and together they measure approximately 525 feet long (68 bays). The building housed the spinning and carding operations. The mill remained in operation until 1999.

It was added to the National Register of Historic Places in 2009.
