= Roxboro Male Academy and Methodist Parsonage =

- U.S. National Register of Historic Places
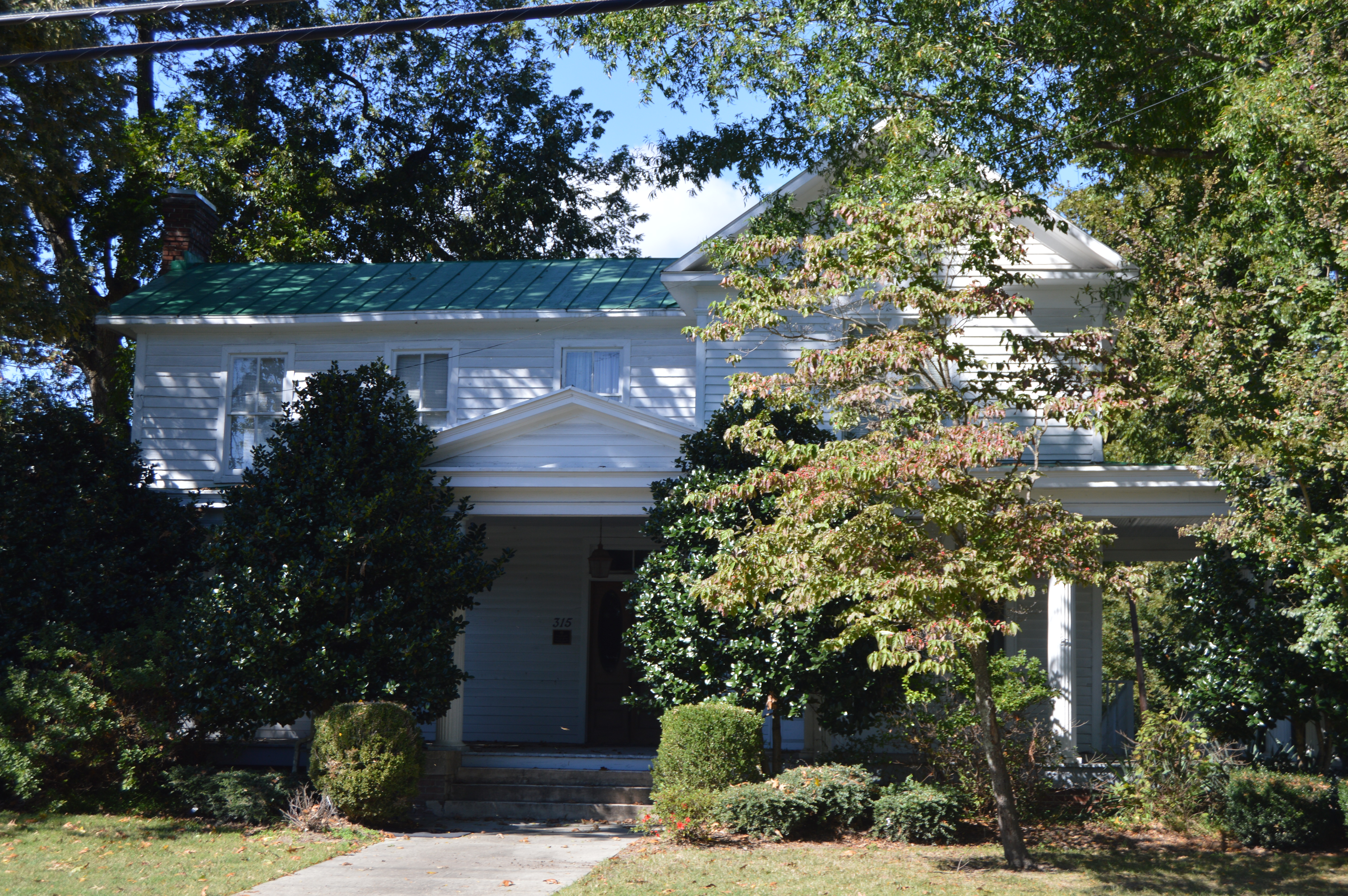
- Front of the house

- Location within North Carolina Location within the United States
- Location: 315 N. Main St., Roxboro, North Carolina
- Coordinates: 36°23′43″N 78°58′48″W
- Area: less than one acre
- Architectural style: Colonial Revival, Greek Revival, Italianate
- NRHP reference No.: 82003497
- Added to NRHP: July 29, 1982

Roxboro Male Academy and Methodist Parsonage is a historic school and church parsonage located at 315 N. Main Street in Roxboro, Person County, North Carolina. The original main block, a two-story, single-pile, frame building with Greek Revival elements, was constructed between 1840 and 1854. A two-story addition with Italianate-style addition was built in the late-19th century. The house took on some Colonial Revival style design elements with the addition of a front porch and interior changes in that style. It is one of the oldest buildings still standing in the town of Roxboro and served as a Methodist parsonage from 1854 to 1915.

The house was added to the National Register of Historic Places in 1982.
