= Bushy Fork, North Carolina =

Coordinates: 36°18′29″N 79°05′11″W

Bushy Fork is an unincorporated community in Person County, North Carolina. As of 2020, it has a population of 2,336. Its proximity is associated with the historical Henry-Vernon House built in 1854.

== Geography ==
Bushy Fork is located at -79.086401 Longitude and 36.3079175 Latitude. It exists on an elevation of -32808 ft (-10000 m). It is 3.7 miles northwest of Hurdle Mills by way of Charlie Long Road and 4.2 miles by way of the Robert Whitfield, Union Grove Church and Hurdle Mills Roads.

== Demographics ==
69% of Bushy Fork township residents have lived in the same house for five consecutive years. 33% of residents lived in Person County. 66% of residents have lived in different counties within the state. Statistics report a 3.5% of unmarried couples. 0.2% of couples are of the same sex. A statistic taken of housing units reports 746 of homes include a single detachment unit while a secondary majority of housing includes 225 mobile homes. 21 homes have two detachment units and 16 homes have 3 or 4 detachment units. The Median worth of mobile homes is reported to be $63,900. 188 residents in Bushy Fork have a mortgage. Around 58 of residents have 2 mortgages. A figure of 17 residents have a home equity loan. At least 178 existing houses do not have a mortgage. 72% of residents owned their homes while the remaining 28% of residents rent. The median home value is around $185,800 and median rent is around $1,086.

18% of residents are aged 65 and over. 17% are between ages 55 and 64. 13% are between the ages of 35 and 44 and 12% are between the ages of 25 and 34. Only 8% of residents are between the ages of 18 and 24. Children between 10 and 17 years of age average at 7% and children no older than 10 years comprise 17% of the population. Residents with less than a high school diploma make up only 13% of the population. Residents with a High school diploma or equivalent comprise 32% and 36% of residents have some college or an associate degree. 12% of residents have a bachelor's degree and only 7% of residents have a master's degree or higher.

== Education ==
Bushy Fork is served by the Person County School system. Learning sites include:

- Early Intervention & Family Services
- Earl Bradsher Preschool
- Person County Schools Virtual Academy
- Stories Creek Elementary School
- Woodland Elementary School
- Helena Elementary School
- Oak Lane Elementary School
- North Elementary School
- North End Elementary School
- South Elementary School
- Northern Middle School
- Southern Middle School
- Person Early College for Innovation & Leadership
- Person High School
- Person County Learning Academy

Bushy Fork is also served by the Caswell County School District, which includes Bartlett Yancey High School.
