= Roxboro, North Carolina =

- City
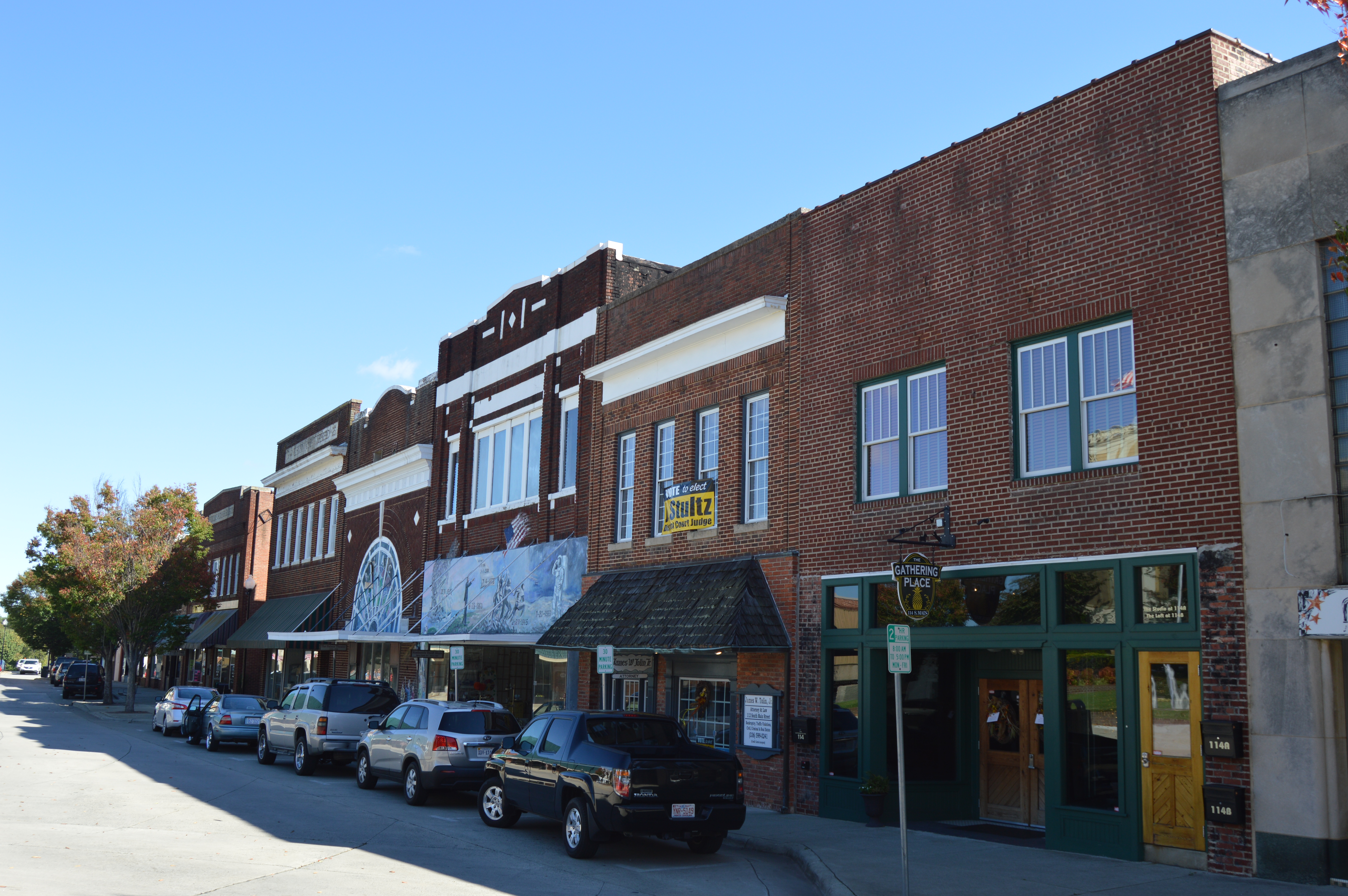
- Main Street Uptown

- Seal
- Motto: "Progress Is Our Business"
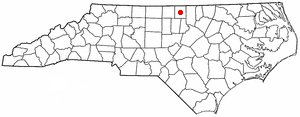
- Location of Roxboro, North Carolina
- Coordinates: 36°23′13″N 78°58′52″W
- Country: United States
- State: North Carolina
- County: Person
- Established: 1855

Government
  - Mayor: Cynthia C. Petty

Area
  - Total: 7.14 sq mi (18.49 km^{2})
  - Land: 7.13 sq mi (18.47 km^{2})
  - Water: 0.0077 sq mi (0.02 km^{2})
- Elevation: 715 ft (218 m)

Population (2020)
  - Total: 8,134
  - Estimate (2025): 8,380 ▲
  - Density: 1,140.3/sq mi (440.28/km^{2})
- Time zone: UTC-5 (Eastern (EST))
  - Summer (DST): UTC-4 (EDT)
- ZIP codes: 27573, 27574
- Area code(s): 336, 743, *919 *small portion near Granville Co.
- FIPS code: 37-58160
- GNIS feature ID: 2404652
- Major airport: Raleigh–Durham International Airport
- Website: www.cityofroxboro.com

Roxboro is a city in and the county seat of Person County in the U.S. state of North Carolina. The population was 8,134 at the 2020 census. The city is 30 miles (48 km) north of Durham and is a part of the four-county Durham–Chapel Hill Metropolitan Statistical Area, which has a population of 649,903 as of the 2020 Census. The Durham–Chapel Hill MSA is a part of the larger Raleigh–Durham–Cary Combined Statistical Area, which has a population of 2,043,867 as of the 2020 Census.

== History ==
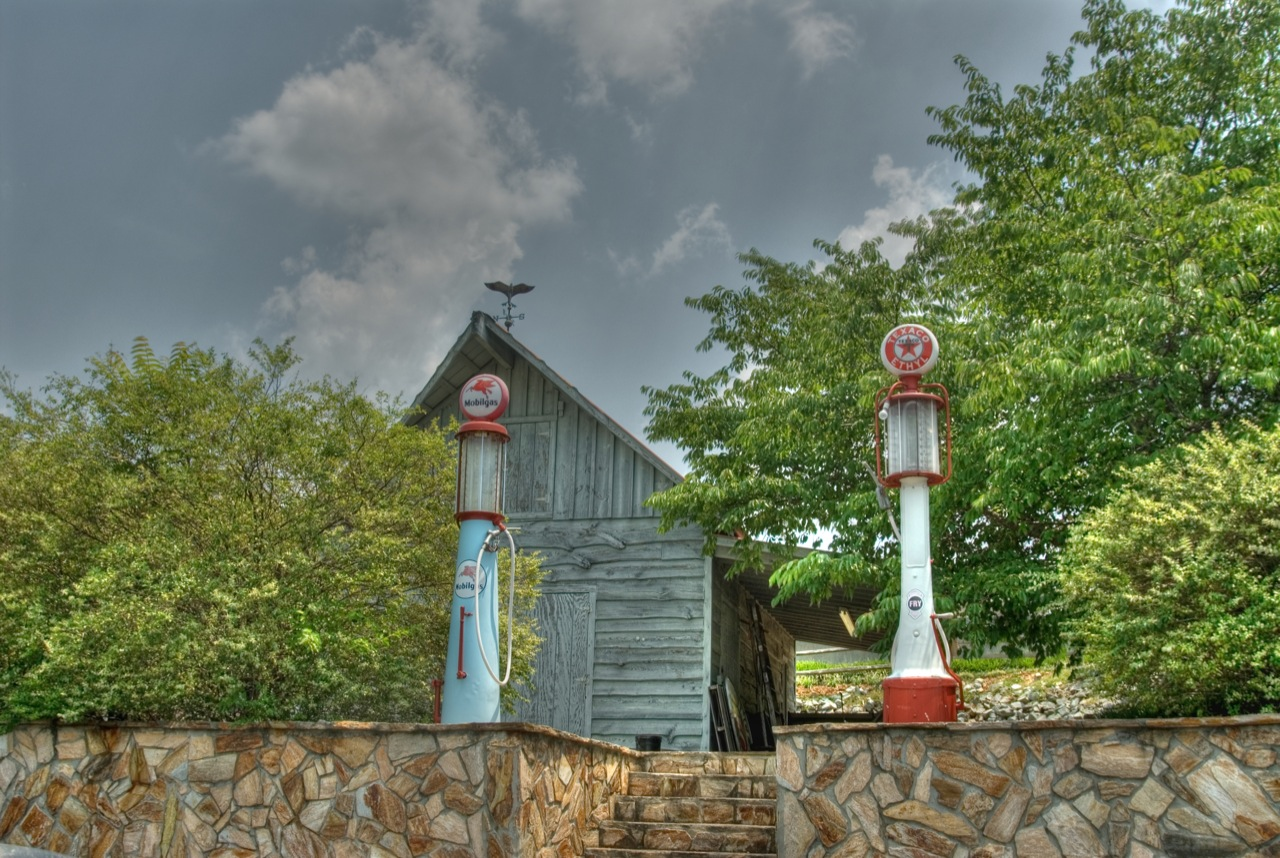
Old pumps at Stuart's Family Grill – "Dog House"

Roxboro is named after a town in Scotland, Roxburgh. Although spelled differently, they are pronounced the same. Prior to the official adoption of the name Roxboro, the community was known as "Mocassin Gap". The city of Roxboro was incorporated on January 9, 1855, and remains the only municipality in Person County.

The Holloway-Jones-Day House, House on Wagstaff Farm, James A. and Laura Thompson Long House, Merritt-Winstead House, Person County Courthouse, Roxboro Commercial Historic District, Roxboro Cotton Mill, and Roxboro Male Academy and Methodist Parsonage are listed on the National Register of Historic Places. The Governor William W. and Musette Satterfield Kitchin House is the main building of the Person County Museum of History.

On July 7, 1920, Red Roach was lynched in downtown Roxboro.

On August 15, 1941, a mob of 500 attempted to lynch Cy Winstead, a 22-year-old Black man, who was accused of raping a white woman and was being held at the Person County court house. The mob was held off with tear gas by local authorities led by Sheriff M. T. Clayton until Winstead could be safely transferred to the state prison in Raleigh. No injuries were reported.

Ten men were indicted for the attempted lynching on October 16, 1941, on inciting to riot and "unlawful assembly for unlawful purpose". To local shock, five of the men were found guilty. A jury acquitted them of the more serious charge of inciting to riot, but found them guilty of unlawful assembly. They received prison terms ranging from 12 to 18 months. Winstead himself later pleaded guilty to assault with intent to commit rape and was sentenced to two and a half years to five years in prison.

== Geography ==
According to the United States Census Bureau, the city has a total area of 7.03 square miles (18.2 km^{2}), of which 7.03 square miles (18.2 km^{2}) is land and 0.16% is water.

=== Climate ===
Roxboro has a moderate subtropical climate, with mild weather in the spring, fall, and winter. However, summers can be hot and humid. Winter temperatures generally range from highs in the low 50s°F (10-13 °C) to lows in the upper 20s-mid 30s°F (-2 to 2 °C), though 60 °F (16 °C) degree weather is not uncommon. The record low was -9 °F in January 1985. Spring and fall days are usually in the low to mid 70s°F (low 20s°C), with nights in the 50s°F (10-14 °C). Summer days are often in the upper 80s and low 90s °F (30-35 °C,) with very high humidity. The record high was 104 °F in July 1966. The rainiest months are July and September.

Roxboro receives an average of 7.2 in (180 mm) of snow per winter. Freezing rain and sleet occur most winters, and occasionally the area experiences a major, damaging ice storm. Roxboro is often dubbed the "Snow Capital of the Triangle" because it often receives the most snow during snowstorms in central North Carolina due to its high elevation.

Climate data for Roxboro
Month	Jan	Feb	Mar	Apr	May	Jun	Jul	Aug	Sep	Oct	Nov	Dec	Year
Mean daily maximum °F (°C)	51.2 (10.7)	55.1 (12.8)	62.7 (17.1)	72.9 (22.7)	79.0 (26.1)	85.9 (29.9)	89.3 (31.8)	87.9 (31.1)	82.2 (27.9)	73.0 (22.8)	63.0 (17.2)	54.6 (12.6)	71.4 (21.9)
Mean daily minimum °F (°C)	26.4 (−3.1)	27.5 (−2.5)	34.3 (1.3)	43.0 (6.1)	52.9 (11.6)	61.6 (16.4)	66.3 (19.1)	64.1 (17.8)	57.3 (14.1)	44.5 (6.9)	33.8 (1.0)	28.6 (−1.9)	45.0 (7.2)
Average precipitation inches (mm)	4.02 (102)	2.94 (75)	4.39 (112)	4.03 (102)	3.72 (94)	4.43 (113)	3.80 (97)	3.81 (97)	5.16 (131)	3.63 (92)	3.49 (89)	3.97 (101)	47.29 (1,201)
Average precipitation days (≥ 0.01 in)	8.5	8.3	9.0	8.7	9.7	8.8	8.8	8.2	7.5	7.1	7.4	9.0	101
Mean monthly sunshine hours	164.3	175.2	229.4	252.0	257.3	267.0	260.4	238.7	219.0	213.9	174.0	158.1	2,609.3
Source: NCEI

== Government ==
=== City Council ===
Mayor and City Council members are elected to four-year terms on a non-partisan, at-large basis.

== Businesses ==
Roxboro businesses include LED lighting, law firms, electrical, textile, manufacturing, aerodynamics, administrative, winery, brokering, food processing, automotive, tobacco agriculture, aluminum and paper products. Roxboro is also adjacent to Treyburn Corporate Park in northern Durham County, home to several companies and North Carolina's Research Triangle region, home to numerous high-tech companies and enterprises.

Largest employers:

- Duke Energy
- Eaton Corporation
- Georgia-Pacific Corporation
- Person County Schools
- Person Memorial Hospital, under the operation of LifePoint Health.
- Spuntech
- Polywood

Other businesses:

- Boise Cascade
- CenterEdge Software
- CertainTeed
- Louisiana-Pacific Corporation

== Healthcare ==
- Person Memorial Hospital, under the operation of LifePoint Health.
- Person Primary Care, under the operation of LifePoint Health.
- MedAccess Urgent Care, under the operation of LifePoint Health.
- North State Medical Center
- Person Family Medical and Dental
- Roxboro Family Medicine & Immediate Care (MedFirst)
- Roxboro MedPeds (Internal Medicine and Pediatrics)

== Demographics ==
Historical population
Census	Pop.	Note	%±
1880	483		—
1890	421		−12.8%
1900	1,021		142.5%
1910	1,425		39.6%
1920	1,651		15.9%
1930	3,657		121.5%
1940	4,599		25.8%
1950	4,321		−6.0%
1960	5,147		19.1%
1970	5,370		4.3%
1980	7,532		40.3%
1990	7,332		−2.7%
2000	8,696		18.6%
2010	8,362		−3.8%
2020	8,134		−2.7%
U.S. Decennial Census

=== 2020 census ===
As of the 2020 census, Roxboro had a population of 8,134. The median age was 40.7 years. 22.8% of residents were under the age of 18 and 19.7% of residents were 65 years of age or older. For every 100 females, there were 81.2 males, and for every 100 females age 18 and over, there were 76.0 males age 18 and over.

99.2% of residents lived in urban areas, while 0.8% lived in rural areas.

There were 3,509 households in Roxboro, of which 30.4% had children under the age of 18 living in them. Of all households, 24.1% were married-couple households, 20.8% were households with a male householder and no spouse or partner present, and 46.7% were households with a female householder and no spouse or partner present. About 38.3% of all households were made up of individuals, and 17.2% had someone living alone who was 65 years of age or older. There were 1,739 families residing in the city.

There were 3,937 housing units, of which 10.9% were vacant. The homeowner vacancy rate was 3.5% and the rental vacancy rate was 6.7%.

Roxboro racial composition
Race	Number	Percentage
White (non-Hispanic)	3,210	39.46%
Black or African American (non-Hispanic)	3,700	45.49%
Native American	58	0.71%
Asian	28	0.34%
Pacific Islander	1	0.01%
Other/Mixed	351	4.32%
Hispanic or Latino	786	9.66%

=== 2010 census ===
As of the census of 2010 there were 8,362 people, 3,479 households, and 1,979 families residing in the city. The population density was 1,296.2 people per square mile (500.5 people/km^{2}). There were 4,044 housing units at an average density of 630.8 per square mile (243.6/km^{2}). The racial makeup of the city was 44.9% White, 46.8% African American, 0.6% Native American, 0.4% Asian, 0.01% Pacific Islander, 2.59% from other races, and 2.1% from two or more races. Hispanic or Latino people of any race were 8.7% of the population. (This reporting does not take into account the massive annual influx of Hispanic migrant labor.)

There were 3,479 households, out of which 28.1% had children under the age of 18 living with them, 35.2% were married couples living together, 22.0% had a female householder with no husband present, and 38.8% were non-families. 33.8% of all households were made up of individuals, and 15.2% had someone living alone who was 65 years of age or older. The average household size was 2.21 and the average family size was 2.76.

In the city the population was spread out, with 23.7% under the age of 18, 8.4% from 18 to 24, 29.0% from 25 to 44, 20.8% from 45 to 64, and 18.1% who were 65 years of age or older. The median age was 44.1 years. For every 100 females there were 81.3 males. For every 100 females age 18 and over, there were 77.8 males.

The median income for a household in the city was $36,918 and the median income for a family was $42,559. Males had a median income of $27,741 versus $23,245 for females. The per capita income for the city was $17,824. About 13.4% of families and 16.8% of the population were below the poverty line, including 21.6% of those under age 18 and 14.5% of those age 65 or over.

== Education ==
- Person High School
- Piedmont Community College

== Culture ==
=== Museum ===
- Person County Museum of History – The museum complex includes seven historic buildings with exhibits in each: the Kitchin Home, Woodsdale General Store, Dr. John H. Merrit's office, The Male Academy/Parsonage, a Subscription School and a tobacco/pack barn, and the Curtis E. Long Memorial House.

=== Entertainment ===
- Roxboro Motorsports Dragway – An IHRA sanctioned, 1/8 mile concrete dragstrip opened in 1960. Car, truck and bike events are the norm during the spring, summer and fall.
- Rock Sportsplex – Features five baseball fields and a batting cage.

=== Farmers market ===
- Person County Farmers Market – Locally grown produce and goods. Located in the business district.
- Roxboro Farmers Market on Depot Street – Fresh produce and other goods. Located in Uptown Roxboro.

=== Festivals ===
- Personality – A one day festival held in October. Brings thousands to uptown. It includes street dancing, games, music, booths, food and rides.
- Lake Mayo Canoe/Kayak Festival – This one-day event is for paddlers and spectators alike. It is celebrated each spring on Lake Mayo.
- Willow Oak Blue Grass Festival – Held in June and September of each year, this park setting is the home of national, regional, and local blue grass bands. The site includes camping, food, and concessions.
- Curam Fest – Indulge in the delicious knowledge of Curam Development. Curam Experts from all over the world gather here to discuss the framework.
- Flem Whitt Beach Music Festival – Usually held the first weekend in August at the Hyco Lake recreation area and includes music from multiple well known beach music bands.

=== Events ===
- Clash of the Carts – The competition invites teams of amateur engineers, mechanics, performing artists, general goofballs, and others to create outrageous human powered soapbox carts to race against the clock in a two block downhill sprint to the finish line in uptown.
- Mayo Lake Cyclysm – Join over 100 cyclists on a scenic journey through rural North Carolina and Virginia. Choose between route distances of 25 km (16 mi), 50 km (31 mi) and a more challenging ride of 75 km (47 mi) for experienced cyclists. Cyclysm Bicycle Tour is usually held the third weekend of October.
- Relay For Life – Cancer fight fund-raising event from all walks of life, including patients, medical support staff, local businesses, friends, families, corporations, civic organizations, churches and community volunteers. This yearly event is held at Person High School Stadium in late September or early October.
- Flat River Antique Engine and Tractor Show – This two-day event attracts many exhibitors and visitors with demonstrations and displays based on the rich agricultural heritage of Person County. Event held in mid September at Optimist Park.
- July 4 parade and fireworks – Main Street is paraded with antique cars, hot rods, tractors and horse back riders. Followed by celebration of American spirit and pride. Set at the Person High School Stadium, the colorful sights and sounds are preceded by a live concert.
- Alive After 5 – Hundreds of musical fans gather to listen to the smooth sounds of local bands. This summer event usually held twice a year in June and July at Merritt Commons in uptown.

=== Performing arts ===
- Kirby Civic Auditorium – Entertainment in this restored historic movie theater in uptown Roxboro features live theater, dance, and concerts. Headliners have included Branford Marsalis, Doc Watson, the Embers, Mike Cross, and year-round local productions. Total seating capacity – 1028.
- Roxboro Little Theater – Producing stage entertainment for over 30 years, through the efforts of both local and regional thespians. RLT has featured such productions as The Wizard of Oz, Steel Magnolias, The Sound of Music, Oliver, and Fiddler on the Roof.
- Merritt Commons Pavilion – Hosts local music acts and stage plays in uptown Roxboro.

=== Public library ===
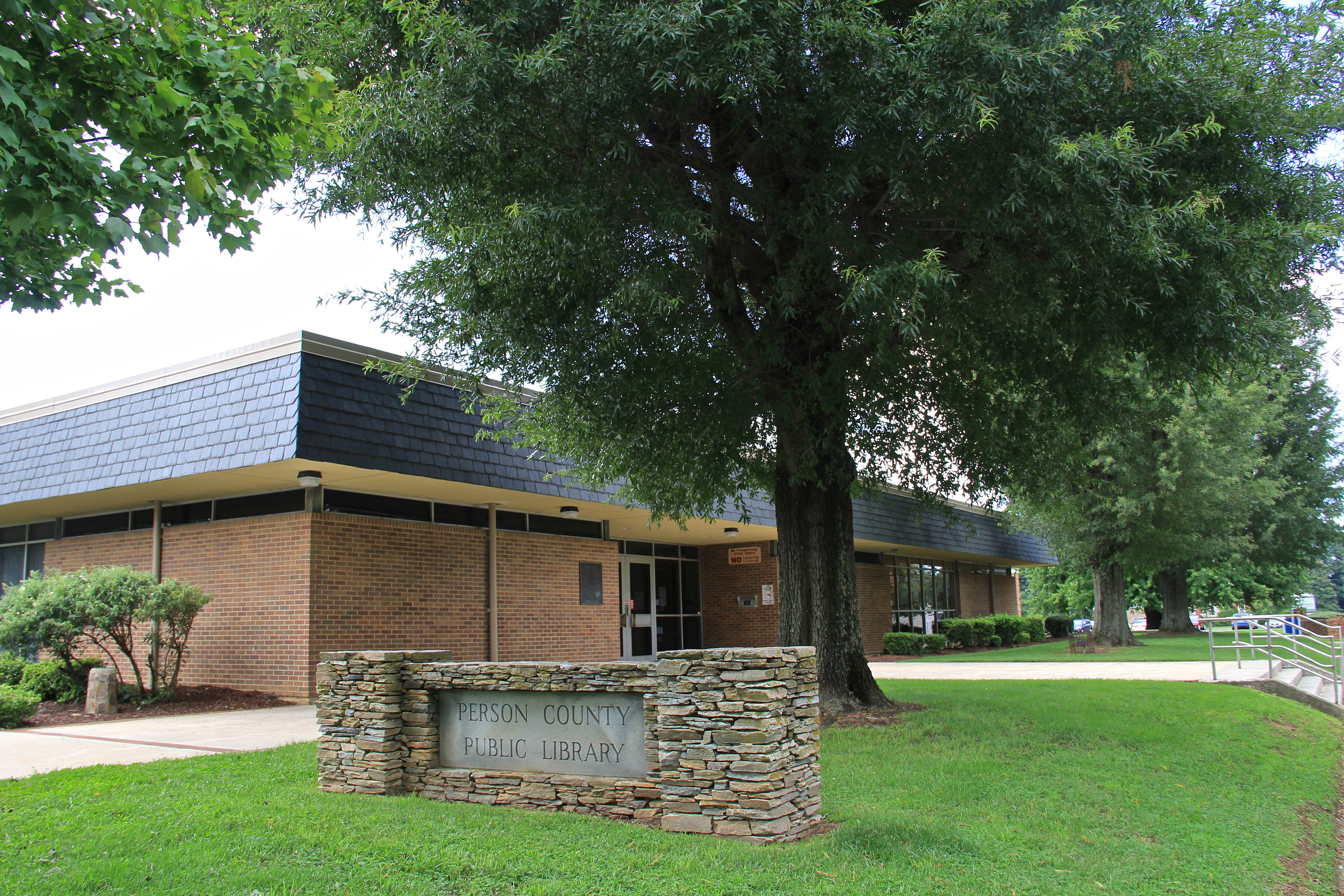
Person County Public Library

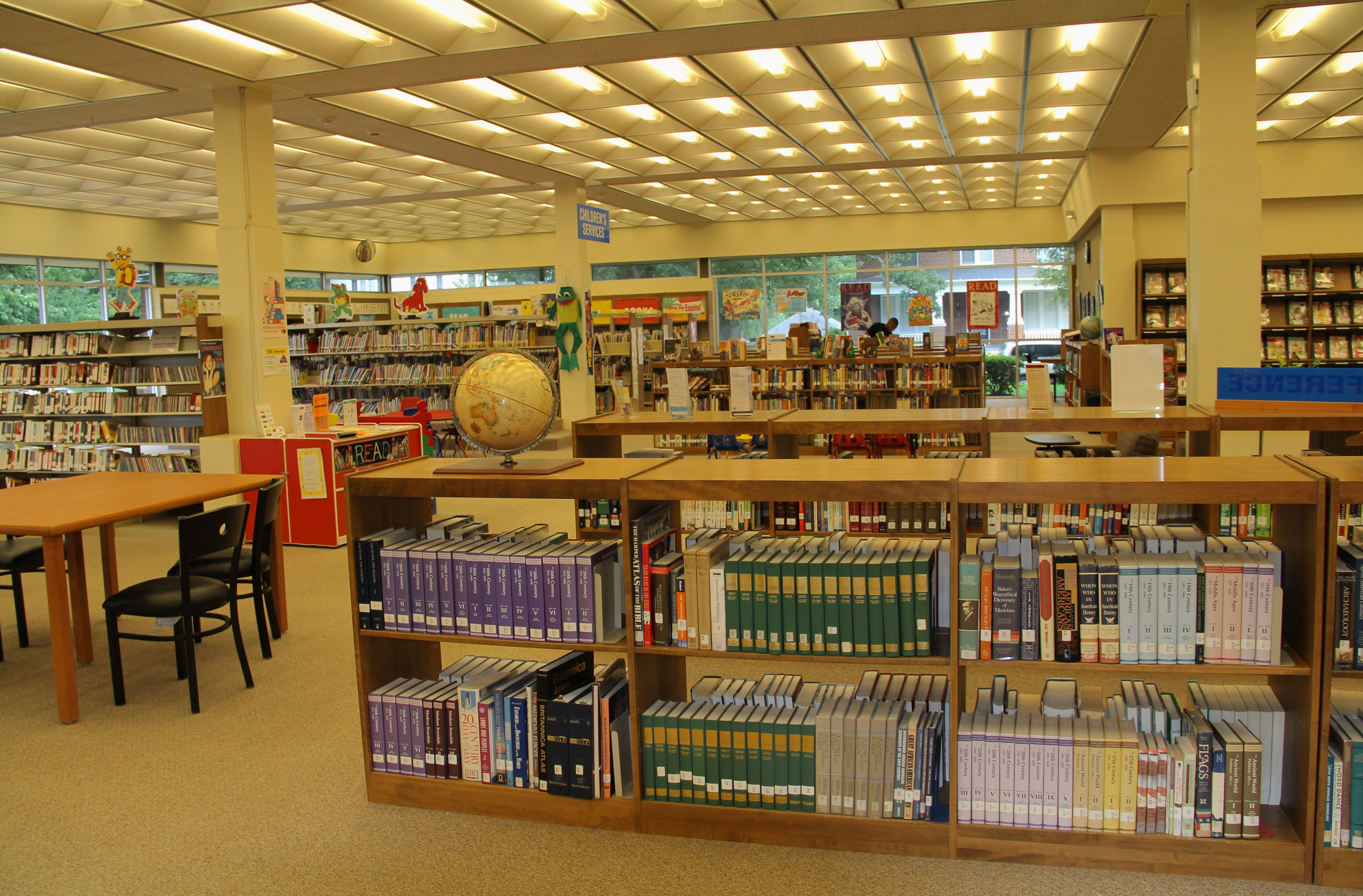
Person County Public Library reading room

- Person County Public Library is located in Roxboro. The library hosts over fifty programs a year for children, and an average of two programs a month for adults. There are over 26,000 library card holders.

=== Parks and recreation ===
Person County Parks and Recreation Department offers a wide variety of leisure services throughout the county providing a variety of recreational opportunities including playgrounds, walking tracks, picnic shelters, basketball courts, golf course, putt-putt, bicycling, fishing, swimming, tennis courts, ball fields, volleyball courts, hiking trails, horseshoe pits and restroom facilities at more than 14 sites, more than 6,735 acres (27 km^{2}) of park land, including:

- Allensville Park
- Bushy Fork Park
- Huck Sansbury Recreation Complex
- Hurdle Mills Park
- Longhurst Park
- Mayo Park
- Mt. Tirzah Park
- Olive Hill Park
- Optimist Park

Other attractions include:

- Hyco Lake
- Mayo Lake
- Piedmont Community College Nature Trail – A system of seven trails with an observatory. Total distance is 12,741 feet (2.4131 miles).
- Rock Sportsplex – five baseball fields and a batting cage
- Roxboro City Lake
- Roxboro Country Club – 18-hole golf course

== Infrastructure ==
=== Transportation ===
==== Air ====
- Person County Airport located 8 miles (13 km) south of Roxboro on U.S. Route 501
- Raleigh-Durham International Airport located 42 miles (68 km) south of Roxboro
- Piedmont Triad International Airport located 72 miles (116 km) southwest of Roxboro

==== Railroad ====
- Norfolk Southern has freight rail lines.
- Roxboro is not served directly by passenger trains. Amtrak serves nearby Durham.

==== Major highways ====
- United States Highways:
  - U.S. Route 158
  - U.S. Route 501
- North Carolina Highways:
  - N.C. 49
  - N.C. 57
  - N.C. 157

=== Future 501 Expressway ===
The proposed corridor was officially announced in November 2008.

It will improve the existing 4-lane divided boulevard facility to a 4- lane divided expressway from the Durham County line to Roby Barton Rd. (SR 1218).

The Transportation Planning Branch of the North Carolina Department of Transportation, Person County, and the City of Roxboro initiated a study to cooperatively develop the Person County & Roxboro Comprehensive Transportation Plan (CTP).

==== Public transit ====
- Person Area Transit System (PATS) operates local bus routes within Roxboro.

=== Utilities ===
The city's electric system is maintained by Duke Energy and Piedmont Electric Membership Cooperative. Telephone networks include CenturyLink, wireless networks - AT&T Mobility, U.S. Cellular and Verizon Wireless. Broadband internet is provided by CenturyLink, Electronic Solutions and Charter Communications. Cable television service is available from Charter Communications and CenturyLink.

== Media ==
=== Print media ===
Newspapers and periodicals that serve the Roxboro and surrounding area include:

- The Courier-Times
- The Herald-Sun

=== Radio ===
Roxboro is the city of license for two radio stations:

- 96.7 FM WKRX Country ("Kickin Country")
- 1430 AM WRXO Country ("Oldies 1430")

==== Other nearby stations ====
- W281AE 104.1 FM (.01 kW translator of Liberty University's WRVL, Lynchburg, Virginia)

=== Television ===
Roxboro is part of the Raleigh-Durham-Fayetteville Designated Market Area, the 24th largest broadcast television market in the United States.

- WFMY-TV from Greensboro, NC is carried on DirecTV.
- WSET-TV from Lynchburg, Virginia is carried on DirecTV. Up until 2020 WSET-TV it was carried on Charter Spectrum cable.

== Notable people ==
- Jamie Barnette, former Canadian Football League quarterback
- Betty Lou Beets, convicted murderer who was executed in the U.S. state of Texas
- Robert L. Blackwell, soldier in World War I and Medal of Honor recipient
- Margie Bowes, country music singer
- Anderson Clayton, chairperson of the North Carolina Democratic Party
- Mary Jayne Harrelson, middle-distance runner; won two NCAA Division I championships in the 1500 meters at Appalachian State
- Frank Kimbrough, post-bop Jazz pianist
- Carl Long, NASCAR driver
- Tom Long, CEO of MillerCoors Brewing Company
- Wendy Palmer, former WNBA player and current head women's basketball coach at UNCG
- James Ramsey, politician and lawyer
- Enos Slaughter, former Major League Baseball player and member of the National Baseball Hall of Fame
- Henry Slaughter, Southern gospel musician, cousin of Enos Slaughter
- Jim Thorpe, Champions Tour professional golfer
- Luke Torian, politician, Virginia House of Delegates 52nd District Representative
- George Yarborough, Marine officer in World War I; recipient of both the Navy Cross and Distinguished Service Cross

== See also ==
- Research Triangle Metropolitan Region ("The Triangle")
- Virginia International Raceway, a nearby multi-purpose road course offering auto and motorcycle racing
- Orange County Speedway, a nearby former NASCAR Busch Grand National Series track
