= James A. and Laura Thompson Long House =

Historic house in North Carolina, United States

- U.S. National Register of Historic Places
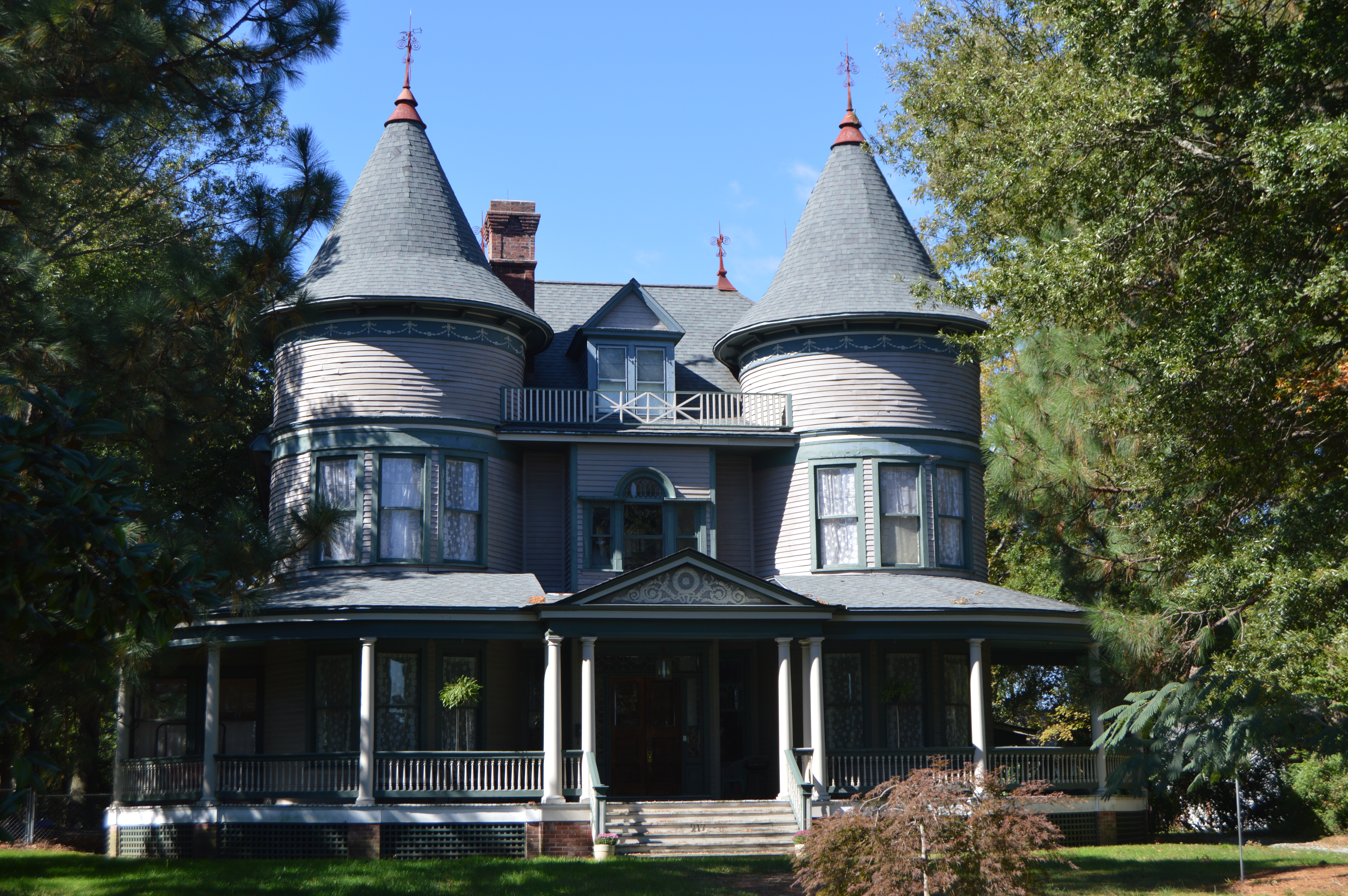
- Front of the house

- Location within North Carolina Location within the United States
- Location: 217 S. Main Street; Roxboro, North Carolina, U.S.
- Coordinates: 36°23′49″N 78°59′30″W
- Area: less than one acre
- Built: 1896
- Architectural style: Queen Anne
- NRHP reference No.: 05000267
- Added to NRHP: April 6, 2005

James A. and Laura Thompson Long House is a historic home located at Roxboro, Person County, North Carolina. It was built in 1896, and is a three-story, rectangular, Queen Anne style frame dwelling with a rear ell and enclosed rear porch. It features round towers with conical roofs at the front corners, a one-story wraparound porch with Doric order columns, and a hipped slate roof with dormers. The house was subdivided into apartments in the 1940s. Its builder, J. A. Long (1841–1915), is considered the "founder of modern Roxboro."

The house was added to the National Register of Historic Places in 2005.
