= Henry-Vernon House =

Historic house in North Carolina, United States

- U.S. National Register of Historic Places
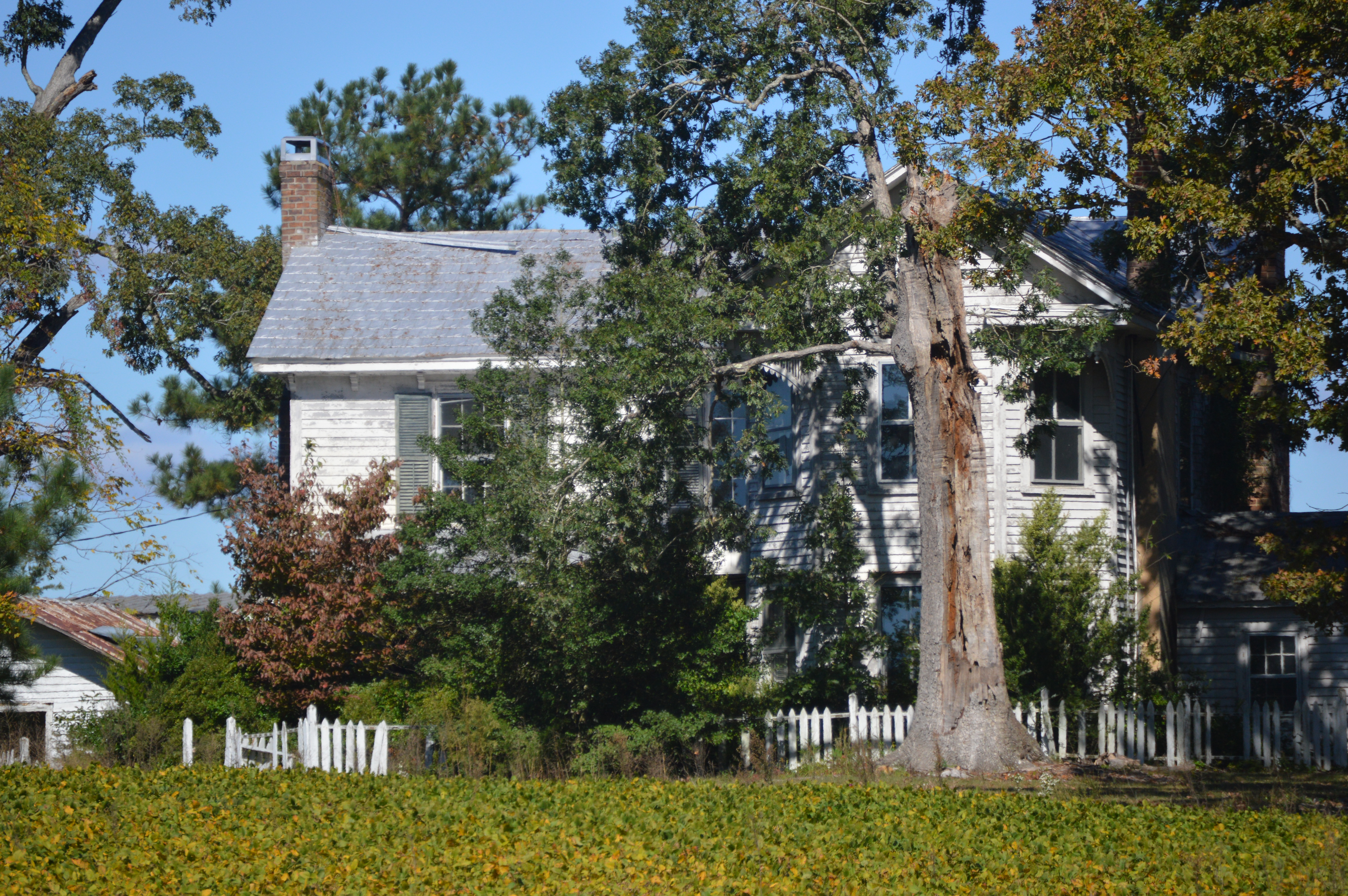
- Front of the house

- Location within North Carolina Location within the United States
- Location: SW of Bushy Fork on North Carolina Highway 49, near Bushy Fork, North Carolina
- Coordinates: 36°18′00″N 79°06′14″W
- Area: 15.1 acres (6.1 ha)
- Built: 1854, 1896
- Architectural style: Greek Revival, Queen Anne
- NRHP reference No.: 83001902
- Added to NRHP: February 3, 1983

Henry-Vernon House is a historic home located near Bushy Fork, Person County, North Carolina. The earliest section was built in 1854, and is a two-story, Greek Revival style frame structure, with a one-story ell. In 1896, a Queen Anne style frame wing was added to the front of the house. Also on the property are two log tobacco barns, a corn crib, and a granary, all contributing buildings.

The house was added to the National Register of Historic Places in 1983.
