= Merritt-Winstead House =

Historic house in North Carolina, United States

- U.S. National Register of Historic Places
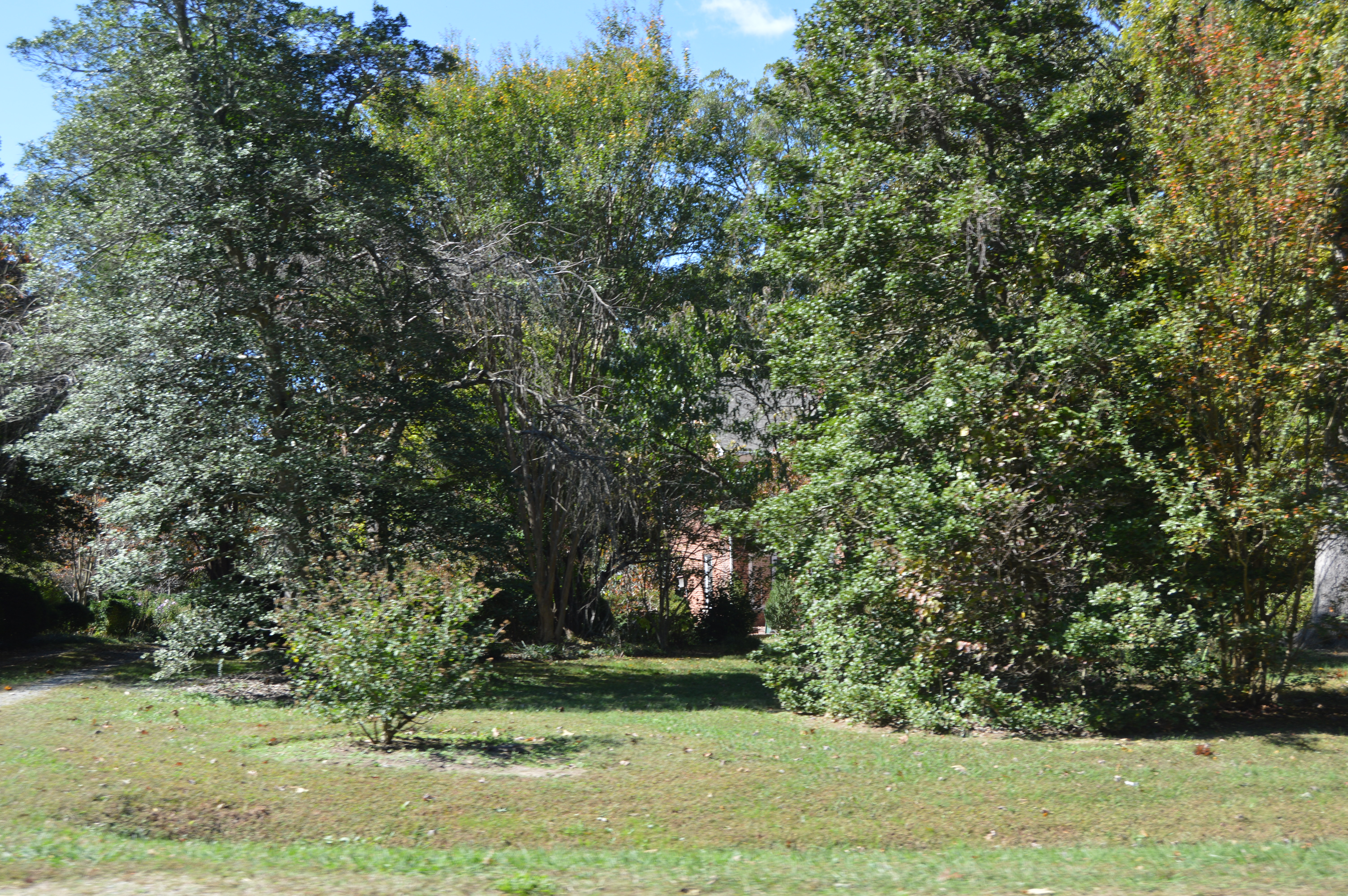
- Roadside view of the property

- Location within North Carolina Location within the United States
- Location: 7891 Boston Rd., near Roxboro, North Carolina
- Coordinates: 36°28′56″N 78°55′7″W
- Area: 6.6 acres (2.7 ha)
- Built: 1915, 1934
- Architectural style: Queen Anne, Colonial Revival
- NRHP reference No.: 05001031
- Added to NRHP: September 15, 2005

Merritt-Winstead House is a historic home located near Roxboro, Person County, North Carolina. It was built in 1915, as a 1 1/2-story, transitional Queen Anne / Colonial Revival style frame dwelling. It was enlarged in 1934 to a two-story, three-bay, Colonial Revival dwelling veneered in brick with a one-story, wrap-around American Craftsman-style front porch. A one-story vestibule was added to the front facade about 1950. Also on the property are a contributing carport (c. 1950), garage (c. 1934), tennis court (c. 1925), swimming pool complex (c. 1952), well house (c. 1950), two grape arbors (c. 1930–1935), Bill Joe's Play Doctor's Office (c. 1928), retaining walls (c. 1952), storage building (c. 1934), barbeque grill (c. 1952), and rock walls and a boxwood garden (c. 1925).

The house was added to the National Register of Historic Places in 2005.
