= House on Wagstaff Farm =

Historic house in North Carolina, United States

- U.S. National Register of Historic Places
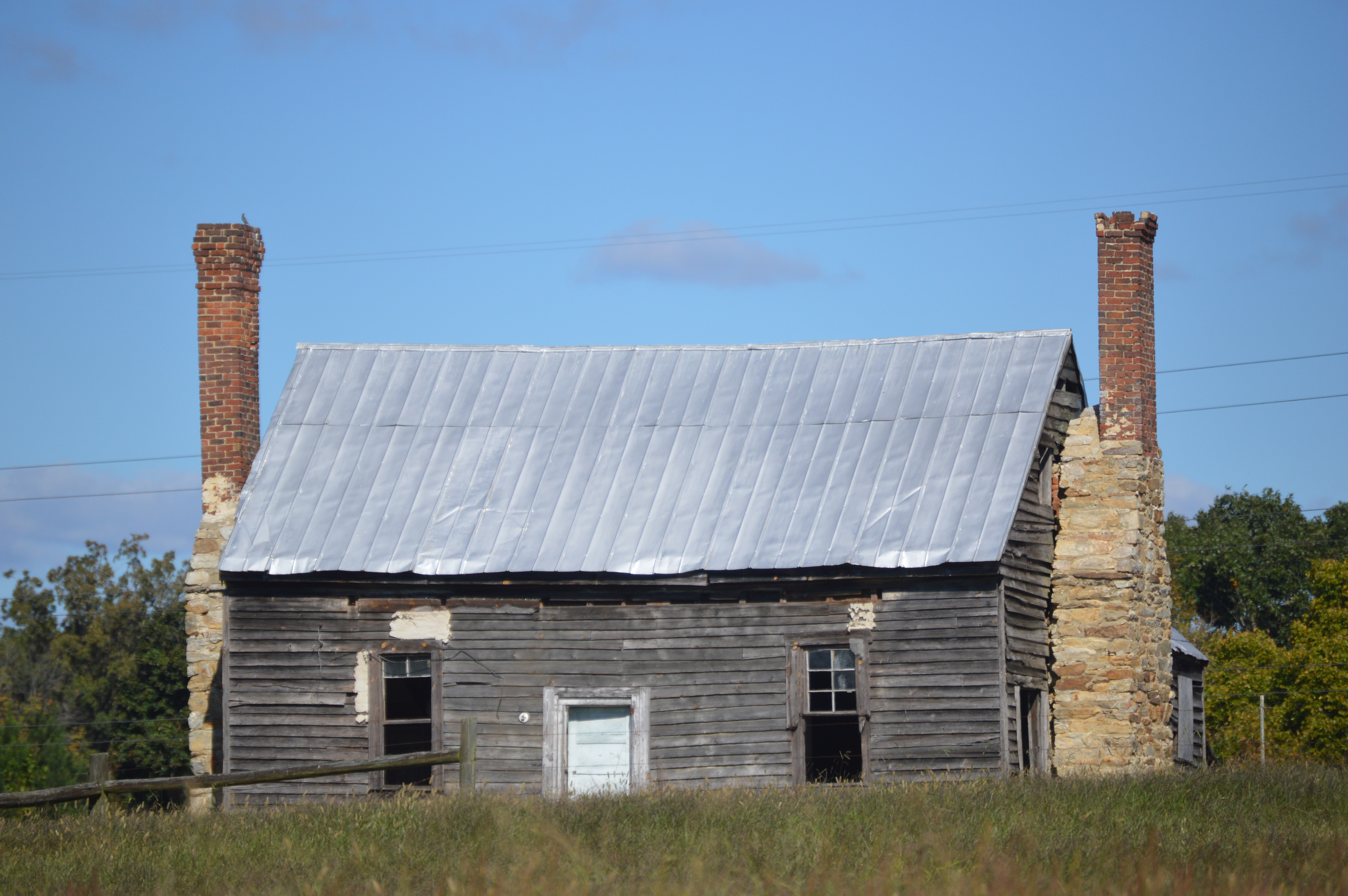
- Front of the house

- Location within North Carolina Location within the United States
- Location: NE side of North Carolina Highway 57, 1.4 miles NW of jct. with NC 1300, near Roxboro, North Carolina
- Coordinates: 36°27′45″N 79°04′48″W
- Area: 10 acres (4.0 ha)
- Architectural style: Georgian, Federal
- NRHP reference No.: 06000229
- Added to NRHP: April 5, 2006

House on Wagstaff Farm is a historic home located near Roxboro, Person County, North Carolina. It is dated to the early-19th century, and is a 1 1/2-story, single-pile, frame dwelling. The interior has a hall-parlor plan and transitional Georgian / Federal style detailing. It has a side gable roof and stone and brick gable end chimneys.

The house was added to the National Register of Historic Places in 2005.
