= Holloway-Jones-Day House =

Historic house in North Carolina, United States

- U.S. National Register of Historic Places
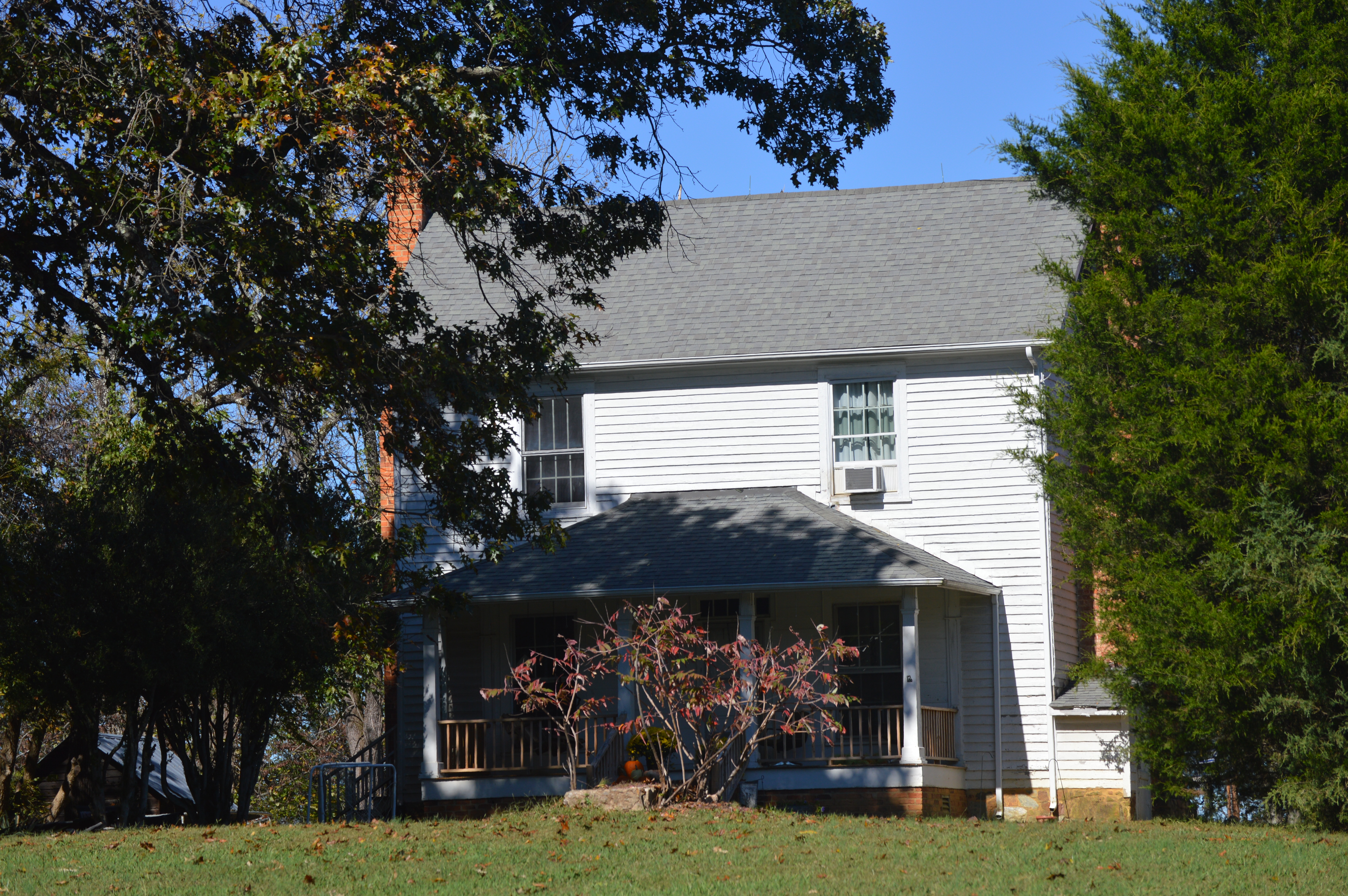
- Front of the house

- Location within North Carolina Location within the United States
- Location: U.S. Route 501 and SR 1322, near Roxboro, North Carolina
- Coordinates: 36°29′37″N 78°55′6″W
- Area: 8.6 acres (3.5 ha)
- Built: c. 1840
- Built by: D.A. Harris
- Architectural style: Federal, Italianate
- NRHP reference No.: 88000698
- Added to NRHP: June 9, 1988

Holloway-Jones-Day House, also known as the Day House, is a historic home located near Roxboro, Person County, North Carolina. It was built about 1840, and is a two-story, Federal style frame farmhouse. A rear ell and hip roofed front porch with Italianate style decorative elements were added in the mid-19th century. It has brick gable end chimneys, front and rear transoms, a hall-parlor plan and a fieldstone cellar.

The house was added to the National Register of Historic Places in 1988.
