= Roxboro Commercial Historic District =

Historic district in North Carolina, United States

- U.S. National Register of Historic Places
- U.S. Historic district
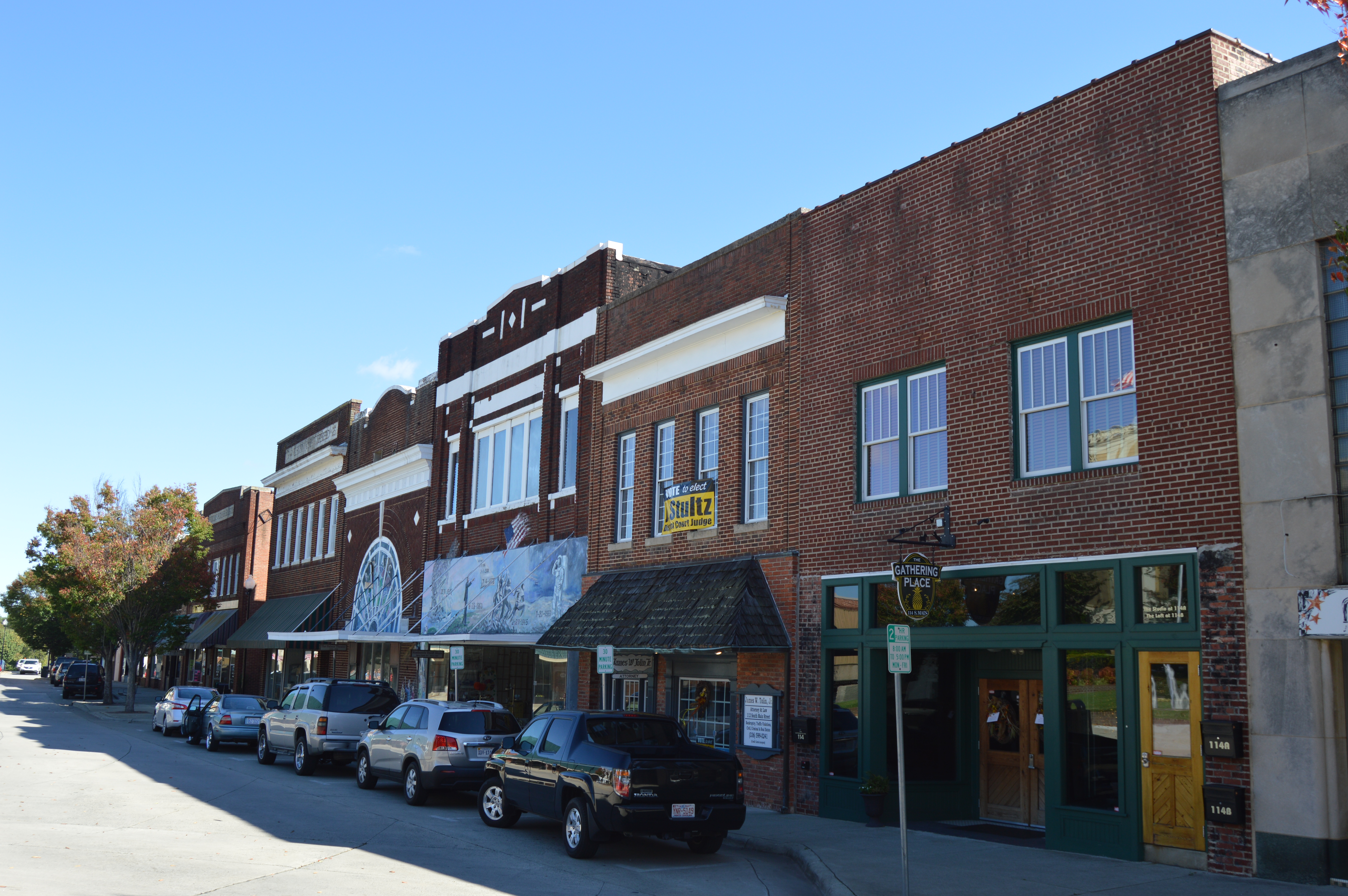
- Main Street across from the courthouse

- Location within North Carolina Location within the United States
- Location: Roughly bounded by Courthouse Sq., Court, Abbit, Reams, Depot, N. and S. Main Sts., Roxboro, North Carolina
- Coordinates: 36°23′38″N 76°59′03″W
- Area: 20 acres (8.1 ha)
- Architect: George W. Kane, J.S. Merritt
- Architectural style: Colonial Revival, Classical Revival
- NRHP reference No.: 84002415
- Added to NRHP: March 1, 1984

Roxboro Commercial Historic District is a national historic district located at Roxboro, Person County, North Carolina. The district encompasses 48 contributing buildings in the central business district of Roxboro. The district includes notable examples of Classical Revival and Colonial Revival style architecture. Located in the district is the separately listed Person County Courthouse.

The district was added to the National Register of Historic Places in 1984.
