= Person County Courthouse =

Historic courthouse in North Carolina, US

- U.S. National Register of Historic Places
- U.S. Historic district – Contributing property
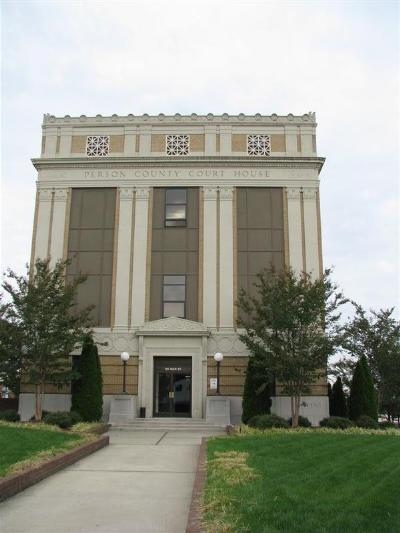
- Person County Courthouse, March 2008

- Location within North Carolina Location within the United States
- Location: Main St. between Abbitt and Court Sts., Roxboro, North Carolina
- Coordinates: 36°23′39″N 78°59′1″W
- Area: 1 acre (0.40 ha)
- Built: 1930
- Architect: Hartmann, Charles C.
- Architectural style: Classical Revival, International Style
- MPS: North Carolina County Courthouses TR
- NRHP reference No.: 79001744
- Added to NRHP: May 10, 1979

Person County Courthouse is a historic courthouse building located at Roxboro, Person County, North Carolina. It was designed in 1930 by architect Charles C. Hartmann, and is a four-story, rectangular, Classical Revival-style tan brick building. The front facade features paired pilasters with flattened and stylized Corinthian order caps.

It was added to the National Register of Historic Places in 1979. It is located in the Roxboro Commercial Historic District.
