= Person High School =

Location
- 1010 Ridge Rd; Roxboro, North Carolina 27573; United States; 36°24′40″N 78°58′52″W

Information
- Type: Public
- School district: Person County Schools
- NCES District ID: 3703630
- Superintendent: Rodney Peterson
- CEEB code: 341871
- NCES School ID: 370363001484
- Principal: Michelle Honeycutt
- Teaching staff: 71.83(on an FTE basis)
- Grades: 9-12
- Enrollment: 1,165 (2024-2025)
- Student to teacher ratio: 25.81
- Colors: Blue and White
- Mascot: Rocket
- Team name: Rockets
- Website: personcosdnc.sites.thrillshare.com/o/personhs

Person High School is a school in Roxboro, North Carolina. It is the only high school in the Person County School district.

== History ==
In the 1890s, Person High School was known as Roxboro High School.

In 1925, a new school was built at a cost of $75,000. At this time, only 150 students were enrolled. In 1966, the school was converted into an elementary school after a new high school was built nearby.

In 1969, Roxboro High School and the Person County High School for African Americans were merged, with the latter becoming a junior high school. Later that year, the school was renamed to Person County Senior High School.

In 2003, at least 25 students were suspended after defying the school's ban on clothing displaying the Confederate flag.

== Athletics ==
Person High School is a member of the North Carolina High School Athletic Association (NCHSAA) and are currently classified as a 5A school. The school is a member of the Mid-Carolina 4A/5A/6A Conference. The school colors are blue, white, and red, and its team name is the Rockets.

Sports at Person include: baseball, basketball, cross country, football, golf, soccer, softball, swimming, tennis, track & field, volleyball, and wrestling.

Person won back-to-back NCHSAA 4A (North Carolina's former highest classification for high school athletics) volleyball state championships in 2006 and 2007.

== Notable alumni ==
- Jamie Barnette (born 1976), former Canadian Football League quarterback, played collegiately at NC State
- Mary Jayne Harrelson (born 1978), middle-distance runner, won two NCAA Division I championships in the 1500 meters at Appalachian State
- Wendy Palmer (born 1974), former WNBA player and All-Star selection in 2000
