= Lynn Council =

Mock lynching victim (1933–2026)

Lynn Council (1933 – August 9, 2026) was an American man who was the victim of an aborted or mock lynching in Wake County, North Carolina, in November 1952. Council, an African American, was arrested for robbery by Apex, North Carolina Police Chief Sam Bagwell, who beat him trying to get a confession. He was then taken to the Wake County Jail, where a few days later Wake County sheriff's deputies, telling him they were going to kill him, handcuffed him, drove him out in the country, and hanged him from the limb of a tree. When he did not confess the deputies let him down.

In April 2019, the current police chief of Apex, John Letteney, apologized to Council. In June 2019 the Wake County Sheriff's Office apologized as well, giving Council a silver key to the Sheriff's Office, and ceremoniously removing the portrait of the then-sheriff, Robert Pleasants, from the wall of honor. Apex has also removed the police chief's name from its Walk of Honor.

Council died at his home on August 9, 2026, at the age of 93.
