= Lynching of George Taylor =

African American who was lynched in the U.S.

George Taylor was an African-American man who was lynched on November 5, 1918, after he was accused of raping a white woman named Ruby Rogers in her home near Rolesville, North Carolina, United States, about 20 mi (32 km) northeast of Raleigh. Described in the press as a "genuine old-fashioned lynching", it is the only known lynching in Wake County, North Carolina. Taylor was honored on the anniversary of his lynching in 2018.

== Events ==
The assault took place on October 30, 1918, while Ruby's husband, Leonidus "Lee" Rogers, a prominent farmer in the community, was 2 mi (3.2 km) away in Rolesville for business. Ruby Rogers was home with her infant son. She later said that an African-American man entered her home, threatened her with a knife, and assaulted (raped) her before leaving the home. Mrs. Rogers was examined by a physician who confirmed the assault.

Over the next few days, police brought at least three African-American men to Mrs. Rogers to review as suspects, but she did not identify any as her assailant. The three men were each released. Tensions in Rolesville continued to grow among the whites, and law enforcement had to avert a mob who tried to take one of the suspects. On November 5, local law enforcement received a tip that George Taylor, an African-American man, had visited a friend in the Rolesville area on the day of the assault. He was arrested in nearby Wilson, North Carolina and brought to the Rogers' farm. Initially, Mrs. Rogers denied that he was the assailant, but after asking him to repeat phrases which she said were used in the attack, she confirmed that he was her attacker.

Police placed Taylor in a motor vehicle and started to the county seat of Raleigh to begin processing the arrest. But before they left the Rogers property, they encountered four masked men carrying firearms. These men stopped the vehicle and dragged Taylor into nearby woods. Police found Taylor's body the next morning near the woods. He had been "badly gashed and tortured before death", shot more than 100 times, and hanged upside down by his feet from a tree. "His back and sides were sliced by knife after his death."

An inquiry followed to identify those involved in the lynching. More than 30 people were interviewed, both black and white. As was typical in lynching cases, no suspects were ever named and no one was ever charged. According to the Durham Herald, "the witnesses...are displaying either unparalleled ignorance of the doings in their community, or are champion forgetters."
