= National Register of Historic Places listings in Halifax County, Virginia =

Location of Halifax County in Virginia

This is a list of the National Register of Historic Places listings in Halifax County, Virginia.

This is intended to be a complete list of the properties and districts on the National Register of Historic Places in Halifax County, Virginia, United States. The locations of National Register properties and districts for which the latitude and longitude coordinates are included below, may be seen in an online map.

There are 41 properties and districts listed on the National Register in the county, including 1 National Historic Landmark.

This National Park Service list is complete through NPS recent listings posted October 23, 2026.

== Current listings ==
	Name on the Register	Image	Date listed	Location	City or town	Description
1	Berry Hill	Berry Hill	November 25, 1969 (#69000246)	South of the junction of River and Berry Hill Rds. 36°41′55″N 78°56′38″W	South Boston	
2	Black Walnut	Black Walnut	October 29, 1991 (#91001597)	Black Walnut Rd., 850 feet (260 m) south of its junction with Green Valley Rd. 36°51′49″N 78°43′20″W	Clover	
3	Bloomsburg (Watkins House)	Bloomsburg (Watkins House)	August 28, 2017 (#100001509)	9000 U.S. Route 58; 36°37′59″N 79°01′16″W	South Boston	
4	Brandon Plantation	Brandon Plantation	April 26, 1996 (#96000495)	Coleman Dr., 500 feet (150 m) west of its junction with Henderson Rd. 36°34′38″N 79°07′07″W	Alton	
5	Brandon-on-the-Dan	Brandon-on-the-Dan	August 28, 2017 (#100001510)	1072 State Route 119; 36°34′51″N 79°08′28″W	Alton	
6	Brooklyn Store and Post Office	Brooklyn Store and Post Office	January 22, 1996 (#95001557)	Northern side of Brooklyn Rd., 0.1 miles (0.16 km) west of its junction with Jeremy Creek Rd. 36°40′38″N 79°09′05″W	Brooklyn	
7	Brooklyn Tobacco Factory	Brooklyn Tobacco Factory	January 22, 1996 (#95001559)	Northern side of River Rd., 0.25 miles (0.40 km) east of its junction with Jeremy Creek Rd. 36°40′45″N 79°08′42″W	Brooklyn	
8	Buckshoal Farm	Buckshoal Farm	September 16, 1987 (#87001473)	Hudson Rd. 36°38′34″N 78°46′14″W	Omega	
9	Calvary Rural Historic District		October 28, 2026 (#100013580)	Calvary and Williamson Roads; 36°33′26″N 79°08′29″W	Alton vicinity	
9	Carlbrook	Carlbrook	May 26, 2000 (#00000556)	Carlbrook Rd. at its junction with Hummingbird Ln. 36°43′42″N 79°08′10″W	Halifax	
10	Carter's Tavern	Carter's Tavern	October 11, 1974 (#74002120)	Southeast of Ingram; 36°40′31″N 79°08′03″W	Paces	
11	Cedar Grove	Cedar Grove	August 28, 2017 (#100001511)	1083 Blanes Mill Ln. 36°36′37″N 78°59′31″W	Alton	
12	Clarkton		May 4, 2023 (#100008948)	1216 Hogwallow Rd. 36°59′44″N 78°55′23″W	Nathalie vicinity	
13	Clarkton Bridge	Clarkton Bridge	January 26, 2007 (#06000747)	Clarkton Bridge Rd. over the Staunton River; 36°58′40″N 78°53′49″W	Nathalie	Extends into Charlotte County
14	Collins Ferry Historic District	Collins Ferry Historic District	November 28, 2012 (#12000986)	McKeever Trail and Bull Creek Rd. 37°02′19″N 79°02′23″W	Nathalie	
15	The Cove	The Cove	May 11, 2006 (#06000407)	5059 Cove Rd. 36°58′57″N 78°44′40″W	Harrisburg	
16	DeJarnette's Tavern	DeJarnette's Tavern	May 2, 2007 (#07000398)	4080 Stagecoach Rd. 37°00′48″N 79°00′21″W	Nathalie	Late 18th century stagecoach station and tavern.
17	Dewberry Hill	Dewberry Hill	February 13, 2018 (#100002133)	2181 Wilkins Rd. 36°35′48″N 79°02′52″W	Alton	
18	E. L. Evans House	E. L. Evans House	May 8, 2008 (#08000388)	1204 Washington Ave. 36°42′16″N 78°54′02″W	South Boston	
19	Fourqurean House	Fourqurean House	May 6, 1980 (#80004192)	2.4 miles (3.9 km) southwest of South Boston; 36°39′20″N 78°56′28″W	South Boston	
20	Glennmary	Glennmary	February 1, 1979 (#79003043)	Southwest of South Boston on U.S. Route 58; 36°40′49″N 78°55′58″W	South Boston	
21	Glenwood	Glenwood	August 28, 2017 (#100001512)	7040 U.S. Route 58; 36°39′08″N 78°59′54″W	South Boston	
22	Halifax County Courthouse	Halifax County Courthouse	September 16, 1982 (#82004563)	Junction of U.S. Routes 360 and 501; 36°45′56″N 78°55′46″W	Halifax	
23	Indian Jim's Cave		August 26, 1982 (#82004562)	Address Restricted	Brookneal	
24	Mountain Road Historic District	Mountain Road Historic District	October 6, 1983 (#83004245)	Roughly Mountain Rd. from Mimosa Dr. to Academy St.; also Mountain Rd., Academy St., and Poplar Ln. 36°46′03″N 78°56′03″W	Halifax	Second set of boundaries represents a boundary increase of August 24, 2015
25	Oak Cliff		November 18, 2020 (#100005804)	10000 Huell Matthews Hwy. (US 501); 36°34′33″N 78°53′40″W	Alton vicinity	
26	Old Providence Presbyterian Church	Old Providence Presbyterian Church	July 7, 1988 (#88001013)	Cole Ferry Rd. 36°56′16″N 78°49′10″W	Providence	
27	Pleasant Grove	Pleasant Grove	August 5, 1999 (#99000966)	Deer Run Rd. 36°43′30″N 79°02′55″W	Halifax	
28	Redfield	Redfield	September 20, 1978 (#78003020)	3 miles (4.8 km) southeast of Oak Level on Oak Level Rd. 36°42′02″N 79°04′39″W	Oak Level	
29	Reedy Creek Site	Reedy Creek Site	April 26, 1978 (#78003187)	Northern side of the Dan River at the Reedy Creek confluence 36°41′40″N 78°52′39″W	South Boston	
30	Riverside	Riverside	February 13, 2018 (#100002134)	11161 River Rd. 36°39′42″N 79°04′26″W	Sutherlin	
31	Seaton	Seaton	May 19, 1980 (#80004193)	North of South Boston on U.S. Route 501; 36°44′41″N 78°55′22″W	South Boston	
32	South Boston Historic District	South Boston Historic District	September 26, 1986 (#86002471)	Along Railroad Ave., Ferry, Factory, and Main Sts., Wilborn Ave., N. Main St., Washington and Peach Aves., and Jeffress; also neighborhoods of Marshall Ave., New Brick Warehouse, Mizpah Church, N. Main St. 36°41′51″N 78°54′05″W	South Boston	Second set of boundaries represents a boundary increase of June 11, 2009
33	Staunton River Bridge Fortification	Staunton River Bridge Fortification	November 19, 2014 (#04000577)	Fort Hill Trail at Staunton River Battlefield State Park; 36°52′54″N 78°42′06″W	Randolph	
34	Staunton River State Park Historic District	Staunton River State Park Historic District	May 4, 2007 (#07000402)	1170 Staunton Trail; 36°41′58″N 78°40′04″W	Scottsburg	
35	Tarover	Tarover	September 20, 1978 (#78003021)	West of South Boston on River Rd. 36°42′03″N 78°57′54″W	South Boston	
36	Dr. Richard Thornton House	Dr. Richard Thornton House	November 28, 2012 (#12000987)	Golden Leaf and Tobacco Rds. 36°58′38″N 79°01′58″W	Nathalie	
37	Town of Halifax Court House Historic District	Town of Halifax Court House Historic District	January 28, 2011 (#10001187)	Main St., Cemetery St., Prizery St., Edmunds Boulevard, Mary Bethune St., Cowford Rd., Maple Ave., Church St., and Cary St. 36°45′58″N 78°55′43″W	Halifax	
38	Vaughan House		January 24, 2019 (#100003348)	1014 Washington Ave. 36°42′12″N 78°54′02″W	South Boston	
39	Walters-Moshier House	Walters-Moshier House	February 14, 2018 (#100002135)	1421 N. Main St. 36°42′30″N 78°53′56″W	South Boston	
40	Williamson Farm		August 15, 2025 (#100012142)	3005 Williamson Road; 36°33′29″N 79°08′20″W	Alton vicinity	

== See also ==
- List of National Historic Landmarks in Virginia
- National Register of Historic Places listings in Virginia
