= List of United States post offices in Virginia =

United States post offices operate under the authority of the United States Post Office Department (1792–1971) or the United States Postal Service (since 1971). Historically, post offices were usually placed in a prominent location. Many were architecturally distinctive, including notable buildings featuring Beaux-Arts, Art Deco, and Vernacular architecture. However, modern U.S. post offices were generally designed for functionality rather than architectural style.

Following is a list of United States post offices in Virginia. Notable post offices include individual buildings, whether still in service or not, which have architectural, historical, or community-related significance. Many of these are listed on the National Register of Historic Places (NRHP) or state and local historic registers.

Post office	City	Date built	Image	Architect	Notes	Ref.
U.S. Customhouse, Courthouse, and Post Office	Alexandria	1930		James A. Wetmore	(Note: No longer used as a post office.)	
U.S. Post Office and Courthouse, now Martin V.B. Bostetter Jr. Federal Courthouse	Alexandria	1930				
United States Post Office (Altavista, Virginia)	Altavista	1939			(Note: Houses New Deal artwork.)	
United States Post Office (Arlington, Virginia)	Arlington	1937		Louis A. Simon	(Note: Listed on the National Register of Historic Places.)	
U.S. Post Office (Ashland, Virginia)	Ashland	1940		Louis A. Simon, Neal A. Melick		
United States Post Office (Berryville, Virginia)	Berryville	1938		Louis A. Simon		
Big Stone Gap Post Office, now C. Bascom Slemp Federal Building	Big Stone Gap	1911–1913		James Knox Taylor		
United States Post Office (Blacksburg, Virginia)	Blacksburg	1935				
Southeast Culinary and Hospitality College (U.S. Post Office Bristol, Virginia)	Bristol	1930		James A. Wetmore		
Brooklyn Store and Post Office	Brooklyn, Halifax County	1850		unknown		
Muddy Creek Store and Post Office	Cartersville	c. 1800		unknown		
U.S. Post Office and Courthouse, now Jefferson-Madison Regional Library	Charlottesville	1904, 1908, 1936		James Knox Taylor, Louis A. Simon		
U.S. Post Office (Chatham, Virginia)	Chatham	1935		Louis A. Simon	(Note: Houses the mural Harvest Season in Southern Virginia by Carson Davenport.)	
United States Post Office (Christiansburg, Virginia)	Christiansburg	1936		Louis A. Simon		
U.S. Post Office (Clifton Forge, Virginia)	Clifton Forge	1909–1910		James Knox Taylor		
U.S. Post Office and Courthouse	Danville	1932		James A. Wetmore		
Edom Store and Post Office	Edom	1835		unknown		
Franklin Post Office	Emporia	1916–1917		James Knox Taylor		
U.S. Post Office (Emporia, Virginia)	Emporia	1938		Louis A. Simon, Neal A. Melick		
Post Office and Customs House	Fort Monroe					
U.S. Post Office Fredericksburg, Virginia, now Fredericksburg City Hall	Fredericksburg	1908–1911		James Knox Taylor		
Phoebus Post Office	Hampton	1938		Louis A. Simon, Neal A. Melick		
Harrisonburg United States Post Office and Court House, now U.S. Courthouse Harrisonburg, Virginia	Harrisonburg	1939–1940		Louis A. Simon, Neal A. Melick, Rudolph Stanley-Brown		
United States Post Office (Leesburg, Virginia)	Leesburg	1923		James A. Wetmore		
United States Post Office (Lexington, Virginia)	Lexington	1911–1913		B. C. Flournoy		
Lucketts Store and Post Office	Lucketts	1904				
United States Post Office (Luray, Virginia)	Luray	1938				
U.S. Post Office and Court House, now Monument Terrace Building	Lynchburg	1909–1912		James Knox Taylor		
U.S. Post Office and Court House, now Lynchburg City Hall	Lynchburg	1932–1933		James A. Wetmore		
United States Post Office (Marion, Virginia)	Marion	1935			(Note: Its New Deal artwork has been relocated.)	
U.S. Post Office (Manassas, Virginia)	Manassas	1931		Louis A. Simon		
Little Post Office	Martinsville	1892		unknown		
Cental Martinsville Station Post Office	Martinsville	1939		Louis A. Simon, Neal A. Melick		
U.S. Post Office and Customhouse and Federal Building Extension	Newport News	1904; 1939–1940		James Knox Taylor, Louis A. Simon	(Note: Houses five bas-relief murals by Mary Fowler.)	
U.S. Customhouse and Post Office	Norfolk	1852–1859, 1901		Ammi B. Young, James Knox Taylor		
U.S. Post Office and Courthouse, Norfolk, Virginia (now Walter E. Hoffman United States Courthouse)	Norfolk	1932		Benjamin F. Mitchell and Rudolph, Cooke, and VanLeeuwen		
United States Post Office (Onancock, Virginia)	Onancock	1936				
United States Post Office (Orange, Virginia)	Orange	1935		Louis A. Simon, Neal A. Melick	(Note: Houses the New Deal mural Upland Pastures by Arnald Friedman.)	
City Hall (U.S. Custom House and Post Office)	Petersburg	1856–1858		Ammi B. Young		
City Hall (U.S. Custom House and Post Office)	Petersburg	1870		John Gibson Jr.		
City Hall (U.S. Custom House and Post Office)	Petersburg	1908–1910		James Knox Taylor		
United States Post Office (Petersburg, Virginia)	Petersburg	1935		Louis A. Simon, Neal A. Melick, Donald G. Anderson		
U.S. Post Office, now Portsmouth Public Library	Portsmouth	1907–1909		James Knox Taylor		
U.S. Post Office (Pulaski, Virginia)	Pulaski	1911		James A. Wetmore		
U.S. Post Office and Customhouse, now Lewis F. Powell Jr. United States Courthouse	Richmond	1858		Ammi B. Young and Albert Lybrock		
Saunders Station Post Office	Richmond	1937–1938		Louis A. Simon, Neal A. Melick	(Note: Contributing structure to the West Broad Street Commercial Historic District.)	
United States Post Office (Rocky Mount, Virginia)	Rocky Mount	1936				
Salem Post Office	Salem	1922–1923		Louis A. Simon, Neal A. Melick		
United States Post Office (Smithfield, Virginia)	Smithfield	1941			(Note: Houses the New Deal mural Captain John Smith Trading with the Indians by William Abbot Cheever.)	
Woodrum Station Post Office	Staunton	1935				
U.S. Post Office (Strasburg, Virginia)	Strasburg	1936		Louis A. Simon		
U.S. Post Office (Stuart, Virginia)	Stuart	1940		Louis A. Simon		
U.S. Post Office (Suffolk, Virginia)	Suffolk	1911–1913		James Knox Taylor	(Note: Contributing structure to the Suffolk Historic District.)	
U.S. Post Office (Tazewell, Virginia)	Tazewell	1936		Louis A. Simon	(Note: House the WPA mural Sheep—Mother and Child—Cow and Mining by William H. Calfee.)	
Atlantic Station Post Office	Virginia Beach	1937			(Note: Housed a WPA mural by John H.R. Pickett.) (Note: Building has been demolished)	
Old U.S. Post Office (Winchester, Virginia)	Winchester	1911		James Knox Taylor		
U.S. Post Office (Woodstock, Virginia)	Woodstock	1931		James A. Wetmore		
United States Post Office, now Southwest Virginia Housing Center	Wytheville	1916		Oscar Wenderoth		
