= Collins Ferry Historic District =

Historic district in Virginia, United States

- U.S. National Register of Historic Places
- U.S. Historic district
- Virginia Landmarks Register
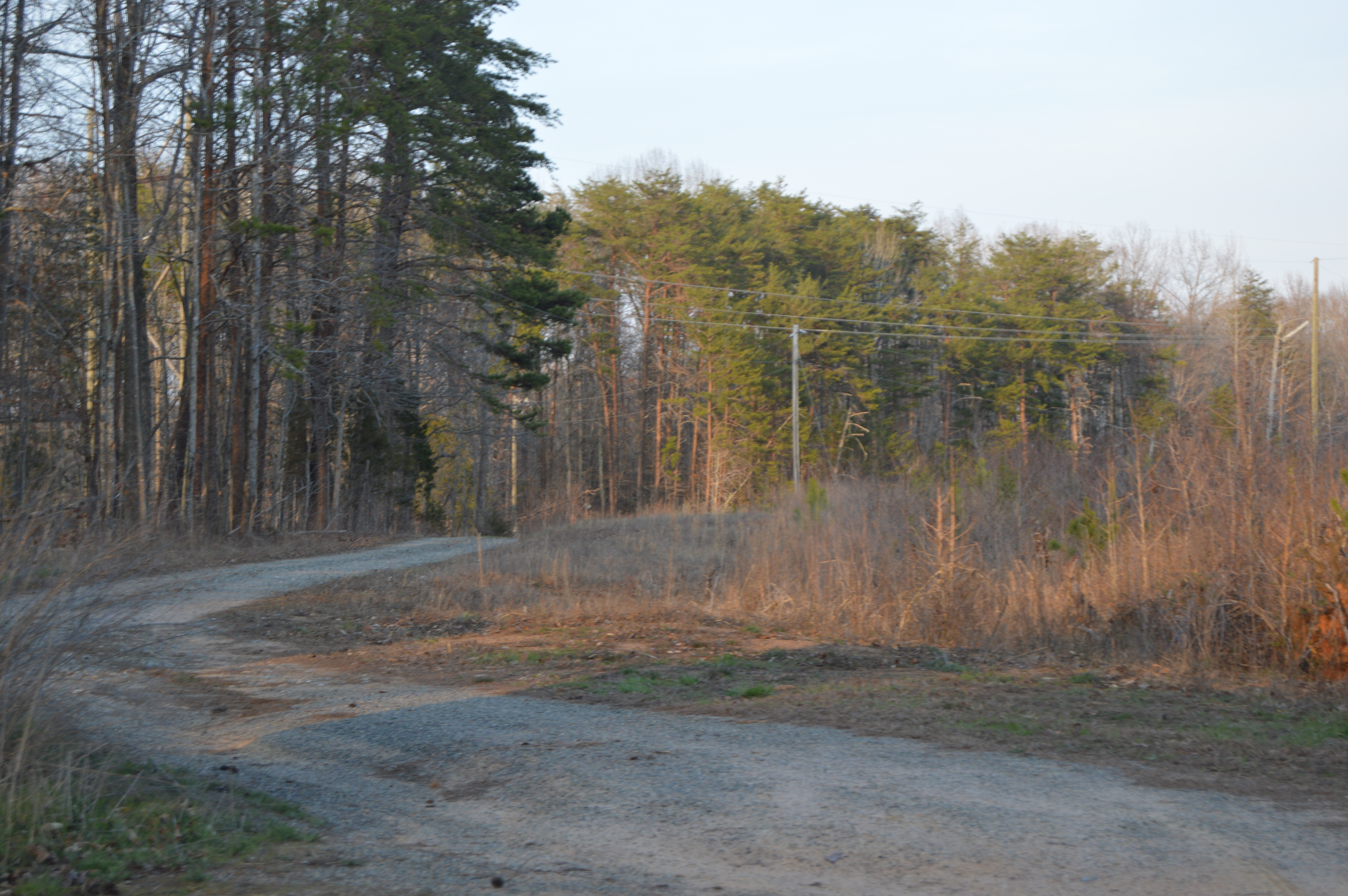
- Entrance to the district

- Location within Virginia Location within the United States
- Location: Roughly McKeever Trail, & Bull Creek Rd., near Nathalie, Virginia
- Coordinates: 37.037503°N 79.04299°W
- Area: 768 acres (311 ha)
- Built by: Multiple
- NRHP reference No.: 12000986
- VLR No.: 041-5350

Significant dates
- Added to NRHP: November 28, 2012
- Designated VLR: September 20, 2012

The Collins Ferry Historic District encompasses two historic farmsteads, as well as a mill and ferry site on the Staunton River in rural northern Halifax County, Virginia, west of Brookneal. The district covers 768 acres (311 ha), extending south from the river roughly to Bull Creek Road, and westward from the mouth of Buffalo Creek, which roughly bisects the district. The Collins Farm, which is located at the end of McKeever's Trail, includes one of Halifax County's best-preserved Federal style plantation houses, built c. 1810 and located on a bluff overlooking the creek. The Collins Farm includes 19th century farm outbuildings, the family cemetery, a mill site along the river, and the site where stones for the mill's construction and grinding stones were quarried. The Hubbard Farm is located south and east of the Collins Farm, and is accessed via a private drive that forms part of the historic road leading to Collins Ferry. Hubbard Farm includes a Greek Revival farmhouse built in 1856, and also includes 19th century outbuildings, a family cemetery, and the remains of a slave quarters.

The district was listed on the National Register of Historic Places in 2012.

== See also ==
- National Register of Historic Places listings in Halifax County, Virginia
