= Tobacco factory =

Place where tobacco is processed

A tobacco factory is where tobacco is processed and cured to make it ready for use as an ingredient in the tobacco sold and used in smoking pipes, cigarettes, cigars, chewing tobacco and "snuff" (dipping tobacco). Tobacco factories employed many people in Cuba, Ybor City, West Tampa, and other tobacco producing areas. Many of the buildings remain. The factory building along with stemmery buildings and warehouses are used in the manufacturing process of tobacco products.

A 1904 catalog from the Louisiana Purchase Exposition records many tobacco factories in the Philippines at the time.

== Tobacco factory buildings include ==
- Royal Tobacco Factory
- Duke Homestead and Tobacco Factory
- Sarajevo Tobacco Factory
- Wentzville Tobacco Company Factory
- Michelides Tobacco Factory
- Brooklyn Tobacco Factory
- Moss Tobacco Factory
- Bull Durham Tobacco factory, part of W. T. Blackwell and Company
- TOP Tobacco Factory in North Carolina
- Tobacco Factory, Bristol
