= Carlbrook =

Historic house in Virginia, United States

- U.S. National Register of Historic Places
- Virginia Landmarks Register
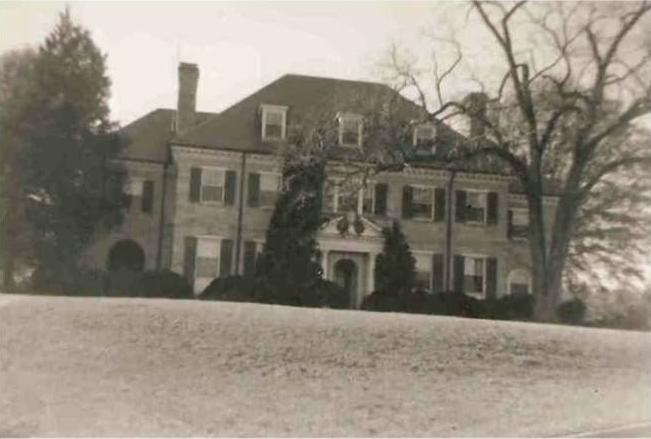

- Location within Virginia Location within the United States
- Location: VA 663, jct. VA 684, near Halifax, Virginia
- Coordinates: 36°43′54″N 79°08′18″W
- Area: 105 acres (42 ha)
- Built: 1928
- Architect: Hartsook, Luther P.
- Architectural style: Classical Revival
- NRHP reference No.: 00000556
- VLR No.: 041-5034

Significant dates
- Added to NRHP: May 26, 2000
- Designated VLR: March 17, 1999

Carlbrook is a historic home and estate located at Halifax, Halifax County, Virginia, United States. It was designed by Richmond architect Luther P. Hartsook and built in 1928–1930. The Carlsbrook house is a 2 1/2-story stone dwelling consisting of a hipped roof, five bay, central block and flanking one bay stone wings. The front facade features a recessed entrance with paired Corinthian order columns and a sandstone arch in the Classical Revival style. Also on the property are the contributing elaborate stone garage, a lake with a stone spillway, stone bridges and garden features, and several smaller outbuildings.

The estate was the site of the therapeutic boarding Carlbrook School from 2002 to 2015.

It was listed on the National Register of Historic Places in 2000.
