= Carter's Tavern =

Historic commercial building in Virginia, United States

- U.S. National Register of Historic Places
- Virginia Landmarks Register
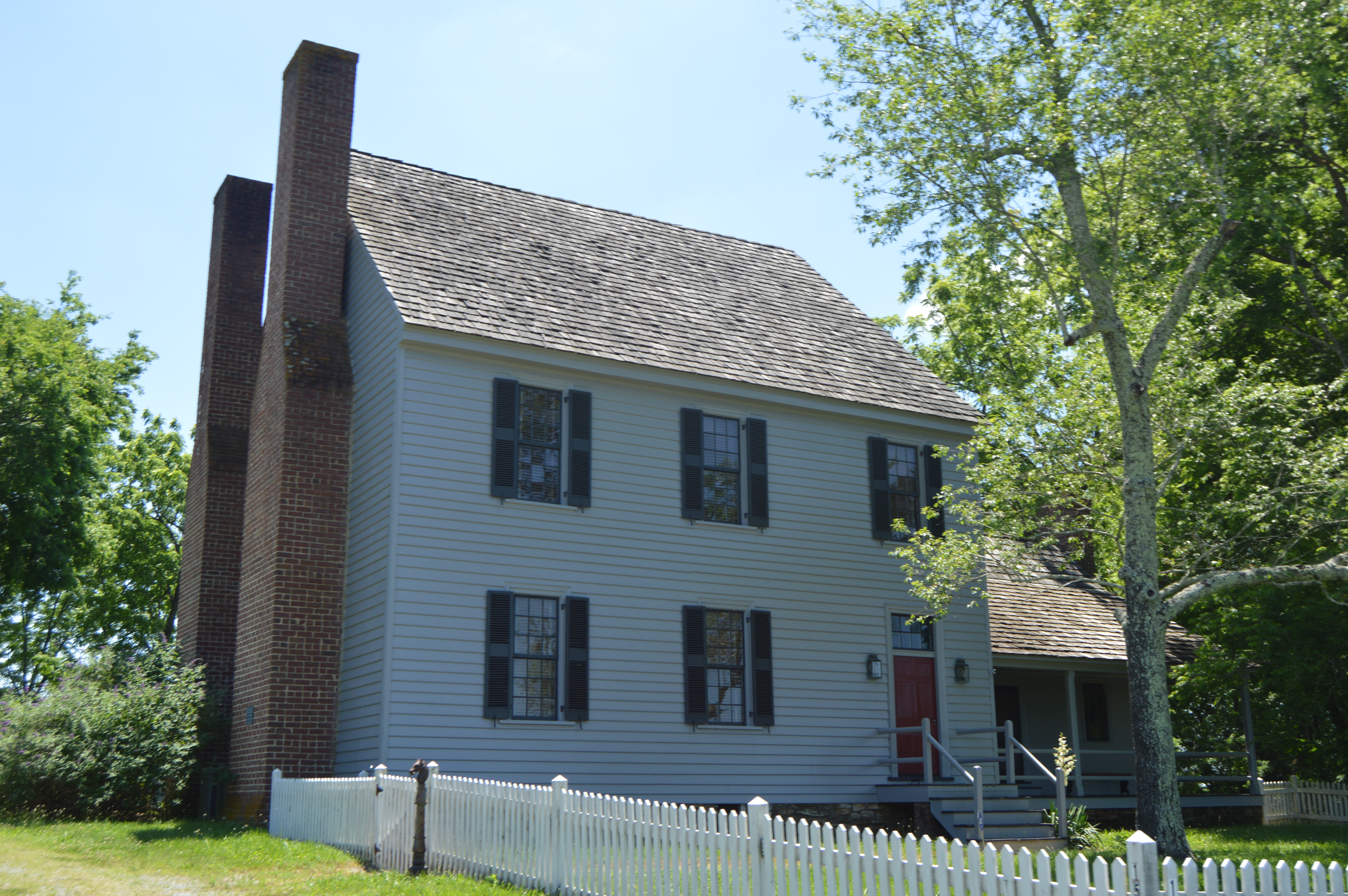
- Front and eastern side

- Location within Virginia Location within the United States
- Location: Northwest of Paces, Virginia
- Coordinates: 36°40′30″N 79°8′4″W
- Area: 2.5 acres (1.0 ha)
- Architectural style: Federal
- NRHP reference No.: 74002120
- VLR No.: 041-0008

Significant dates
- Added to NRHP: October 11, 1974
- Designated VLR: September 17, 1974

Carter's Tavern is a historic inn and tavern located at Paces, Halifax County, Virginia. It dates to the late-18th and early-19th century and consists of a two-story, double-pile, side-hall-plan main frame section and an earlier 1 1/2-story frame wing on the west end. Both the main part and the wing are covered by gable roofs with simple box cornices. The building was thoroughly restored in 1972. Carter's Tavern remained in operation until 1843.

It was listed on the National Register of Historic Places in 1974.
