= Glenwood (South Boston, Virginia) =

Historic house in Virginia, United States

- U.S. National Register of Historic Places
- U.S. Historic district
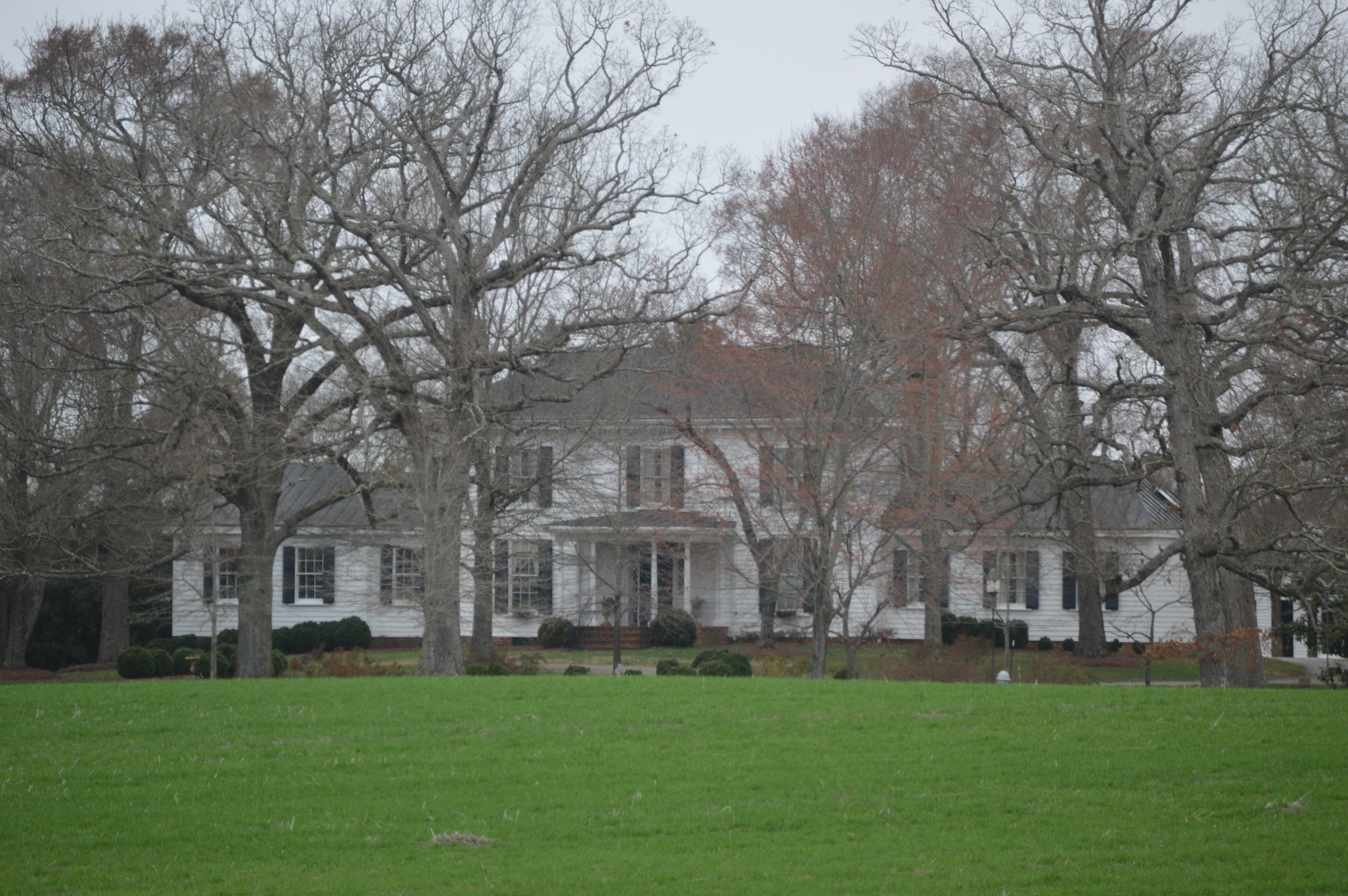
- Roadside view of the house

- Location within Virginia Location within the United States
- Location: 7040 Philpott Rd., southwest of South Boston, Virginia
- Coordinates: 36°39′8″N 78°59′54″W
- Area: 231 acres (93 ha)
- Built: 1861
- Architectural style: Greek Revival; Gothic Revival; Italianate
- NRHP reference No.: 100001512
- Added to NRHP: August 28, 2017

Glenwood is a historic plantation estate located at 7040 Philpott Road (United States Route 58) southwest of South Boston, Halifax County, Virginia. The main house was completed about 1861, and is a distinctive combination of mid-19th century architectural styles. The main house is a two-story wood-frame structure, with a hip roof. The cornice has Italianate brackets, and the main entrance is framed by sidelights and a transom window with Gothic tracery. The interior features an fine Gothic staircase. Attached to the rear of the house by a hyphen is an earlier 19th-century log house.

The property was listed on the National Register of Historic Places in 2017.

== See also ==
- National Register of Historic Places listings in Halifax County, Virginia
