= Clover, Virginia =

- Census-designated place
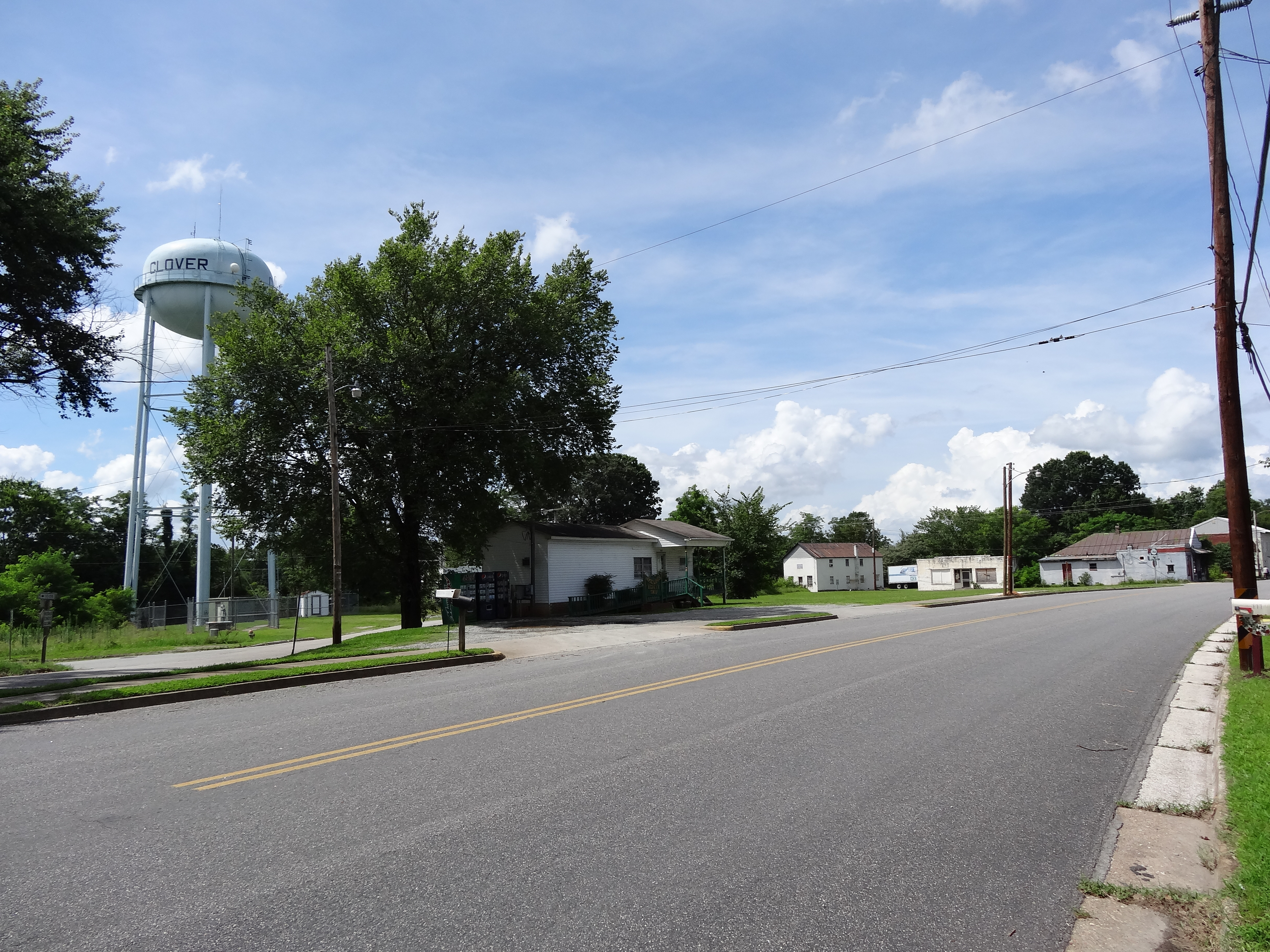
- Center of Clover in 2013

- Location within Virginia Location within the United States
- Coordinates: 36°49′58″N 78°44′00″W
- Country: United States
- State: Virginia
- County: Halifax

Area
  - Total: 7.02 sq mi (18.18 km^{2})
  - Land: 7.01 sq mi (18.16 km^{2})
  - Water: 0.0077 sq mi (0.02 km^{2})
- Elevation: 502 ft (153 m)

Population (2010)
  - Total: 438
  - Density: 62/sq mi (24.1/km^{2})
- Time zone: UTC−5 (Eastern (EST))
  - Summer (DST): UTC−4 (EDT)
- ZIP code: 24534
- Area code: 434
- FIPS code: 51-17632
- GNIS feature ID: 1464998

Clover is an unincorporated community and census-designated place (CDP) in rural Halifax County, Virginia, United States. As of the 2020 census, Clover had a population of 366. Clover was an incorporated town from 1895 until 1998, when it reverted to unincorporated status. Clover was the site of a Rosenwald school, built circa 1921 or 1922, with a three-teacher facility on a two-acre campus.

Black Walnut, a historic plantation house and farm located near Clover, was listed on the National Register of Historic Places in 1991.

== Geography ==
Clover is in northeastern Halifax County, north of U.S. Route 360. It is 14 miles (23 km) northeast of South Boston and 24 miles (39 km) southwest of Keysville via US 360.

According to the U.S. Census Bureau, the Clover CDP has a total area of 7.0 square miles (18.2 km^{2}), of which 0.01 square miles (0.02 km^{2}), or 0.11%, is water. It is drained by tributaries of the Roanoke River.

== Demographics ==
Historical population
Census	Pop.	Note	%±
2010	438		—
2020	366		−16.4%
U.S. Decennial Census; 2010 2020

Clover was first listed as a census designated place in the 2010 U.S. census.

== Notable people ==
- J. Steven Griles (b. 1947), former United States Deputy Secretary of the Interior (2001–04) in the George W. Bush administration, coal lobbyist, implicated in the Jack Abramoff scandal
- Henrietta Lacks (1920–1951), source of the HeLa cell line, subject of The Immortal Life of Henrietta Lacks (2010) and The Immortal Life of Henrietta Lacks (film) (2017)
- Willie Lanier (b. 1945), Pro Football Hall of Fame linebacker for Kansas City Chiefs
- Luther Hilton Foster (1888-1949), President of Virginia Normal and Industrial School, now Virginia State University, near Petersburg
- Henry E. Garrett (1894-1973), prominent psychologist at Columbia and UVa, and supporter of racial segregation
