= DeJarnette's Tavern =

Historic commercial building in Virginia, United States

- U.S. National Register of Historic Places
- Virginia Landmarks Register
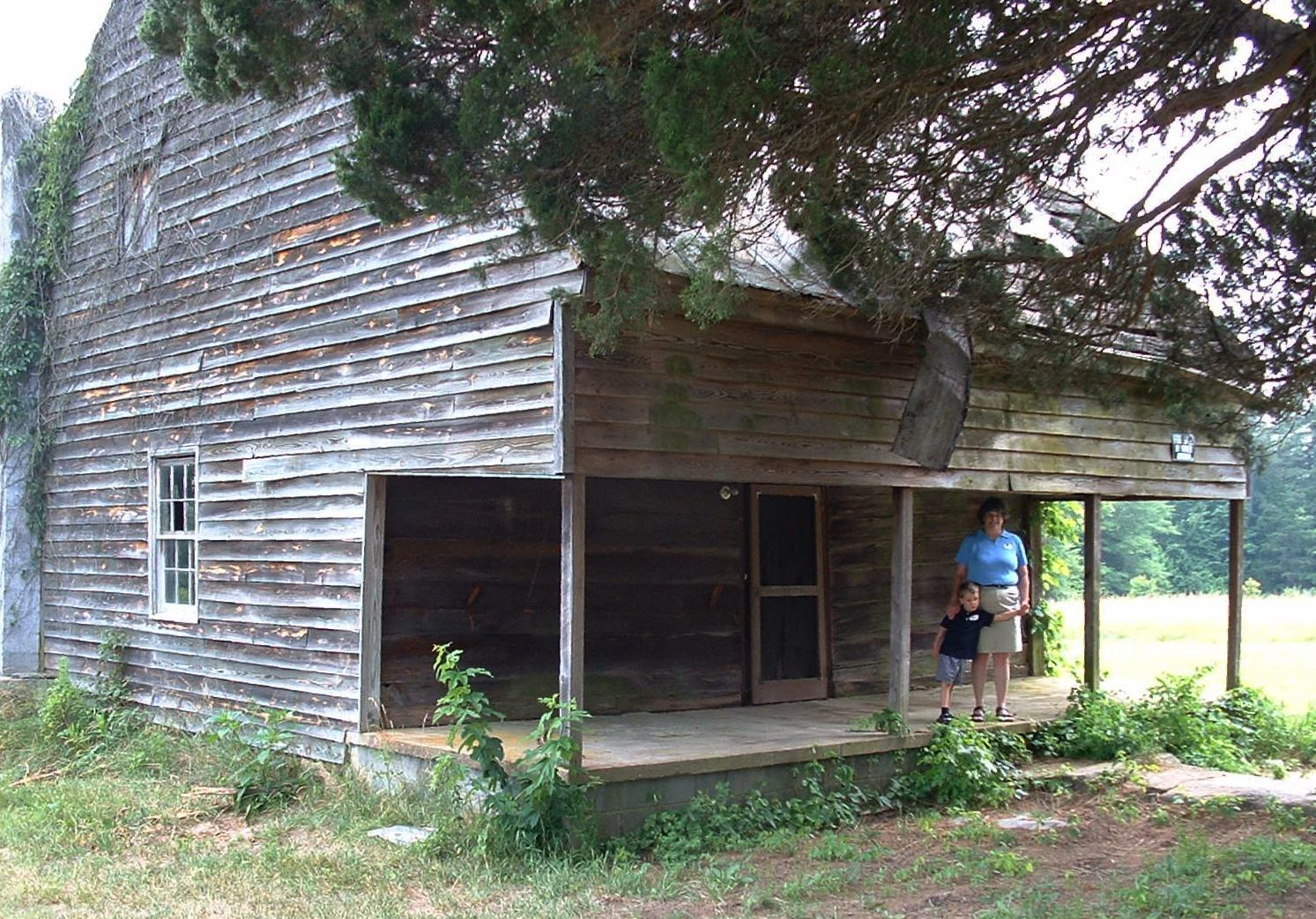
- DeJarnette's Tavern in 2005.

- Location within Virginia Location within the United States
- Location: 4080 Stagecoach Rd., Nathalie, Virginia
- Coordinates: 37°0′47″N 79°0′22″W
- Area: 3 acres (1.2 ha)
- Built: 1780
- Architectural style: Colonial
- NRHP reference No.: 07000398
- VLR No.: 041-0067

Significant dates
- Added to NRHP: May 2, 2007
- Designated VLR: March 7, 2007

DeJarnette's Tavern, also sometimes called DeJarnette House, Daniel DeJarnette Tavern, or Staunton River Hunt Club, is a nationally registered historic place near Nathalie, Halifax County, Virginia. This wooden structure with stone foundations and chimneys was built in the late eighteenth century, perhaps about 1780, and consists of one and one-half stories, with a supra-attic and cellar. Most of the first floor was occupied by a large tavern room.

== History ==
The tavern served as a stagecoach station, and perhaps as a mustering location for Revolutionary War soldiers. It is named after Daniel DeJarnette, who was the son of Revolutionary War captain, James Pemberton DeJarnette. Several accounts indicate that Daniel DeJarnette may have won the tavern in a contest of strength or wrestling.

According to a 1980 newspaper story:

The DeJarnette tavern is believed to have attracted a sports minded clientele – those interested in horse racing, card playing, cock fighting and the like. One rumor about the house that has been passed down through the generations is that a Yankee peddler was killed and buried there. One version of the legend has the peddler buried under the house, and another has him lying under the large rocks which go out from the front porch toward the highway.
