= Bloomsburg (Watkins House) =

Historic house in Virginia, United States

- U.S. National Register of Historic Places
- U.S. Historic district
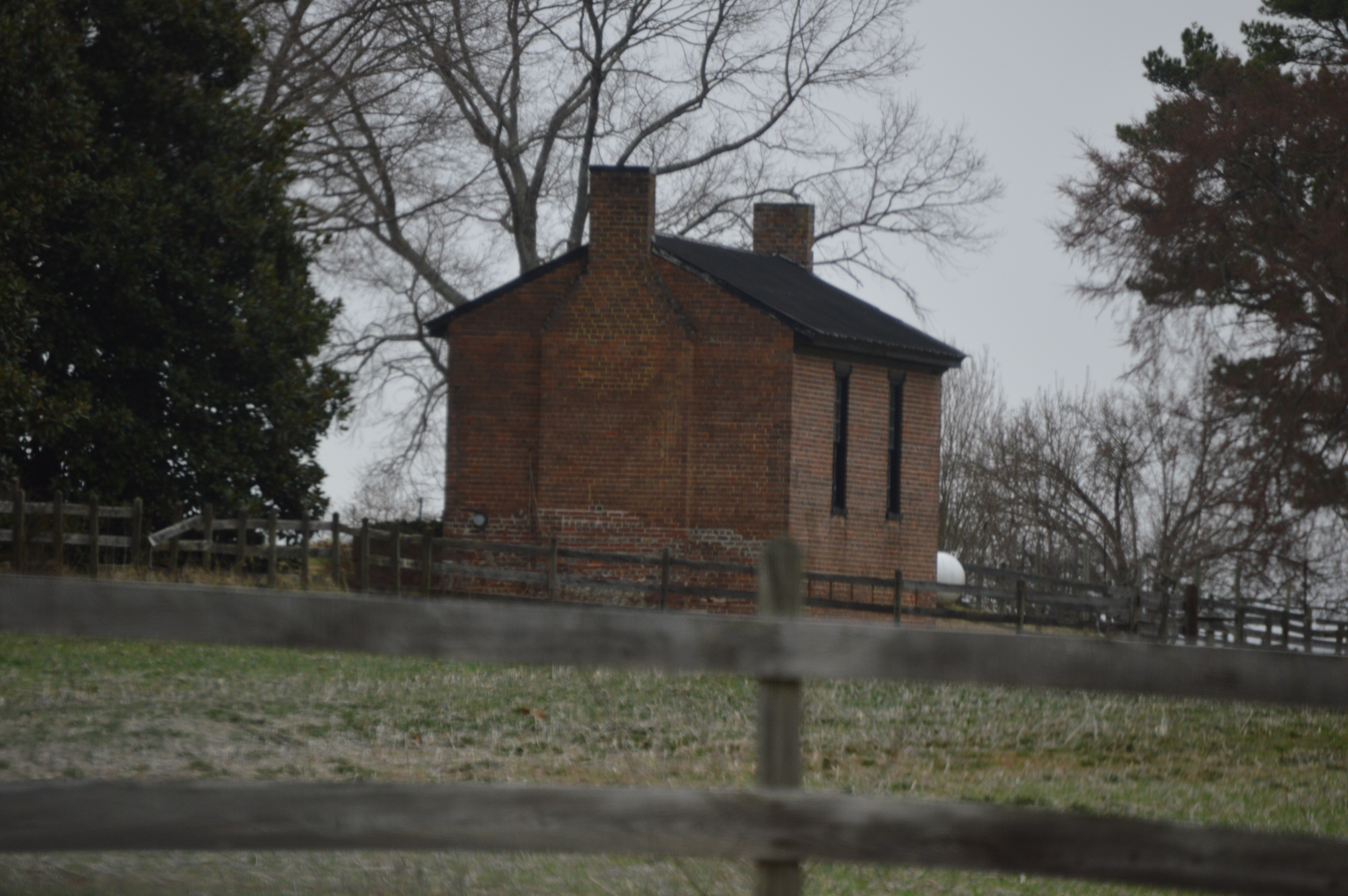
- Kitchen outbuilding

- Location within Virginia Location within the United States
- Location: 9000 U.S. Route 58, southwest of South Boston, Virginia
- Coordinates: 36°37′59″N 79°1′16″W
- Area: 92.3 acres (37.4 ha)
- Built: 1839
- Architectural style: Greek Revival
- NRHP reference No.: 100001509
- Added to NRHP: August 28, 2017

Bloomsburg, also known as the Watkins House, is a historic plantation estate located at 9000 Philpott Road (United States Route 58) southwest of South Boston, Halifax County, Virginia. The main house was completed about 1839, after seven years of construction, by Alexander Watkins, a local farmer and businessman. It is a two-story brick structure, with a Greek temple portico that appears to be a 20th-century addition, but is by lore similar to an original one. The house is one of Halifax County's early Greek Revival plantation houses.

The property was listed on the National Register of Historic Places in 2017.

== See also ==
- National Register of Historic Places listings in Halifax County, Virginia
