= Fourqurean House =

Historic house in Virginia, United States

- U.S. National Register of Historic Places
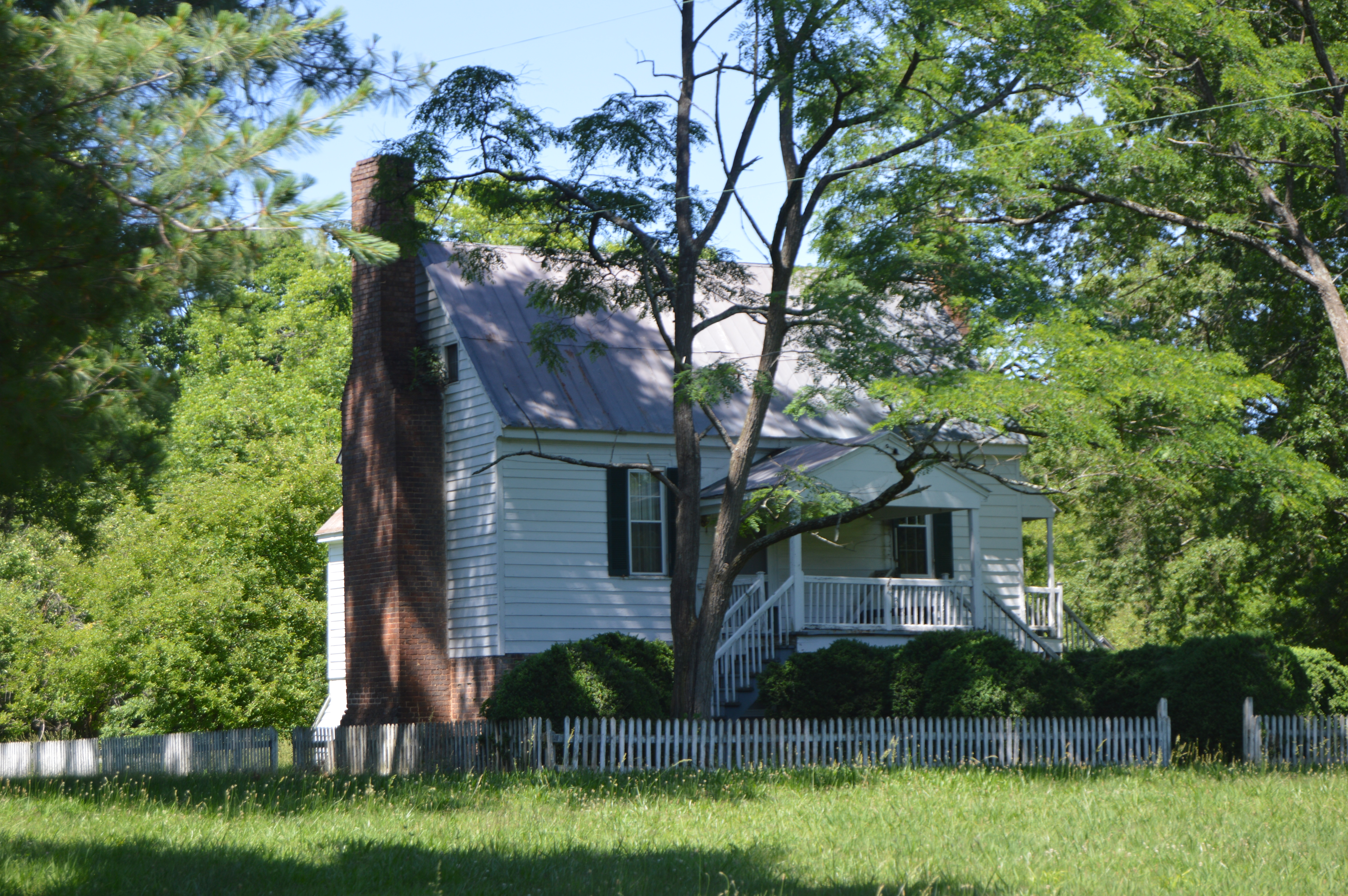

- Location within Virginia Location within the United States
- Nearest city: 2.4 miles (3.9 km) southwest of South Boston, Virginia
- Area: 10 acres (4.0 ha)
- Built: 1830
- NRHP reference No.: 80004192
- Added to NRHP: May 6, 1980

The Fourqurean House, once part of the Little Plantation, is a historic house on Bold Spring Road, southwest of South Boston, Virginia. It is a modest 1 1/2-story wood-frame structure, with a clapboarded exterior, end chimneys, and gabled roof. It has a three-bay front facade, with an off-center doorway between more evenly spaced sash windows. The house was built in 1830, and is a rare surviving example of a modest early plantation house in rural Virginia.

The property was listed on the National Register of Historic Places in 1980.

== See also ==
- National Register of Historic Places listings in Halifax County, Virginia
