= Cedar Grove (Halifax County, Virginia) =

Historic house in Virginia, United States

- U.S. National Register of Historic Places
- U.S. Historic district
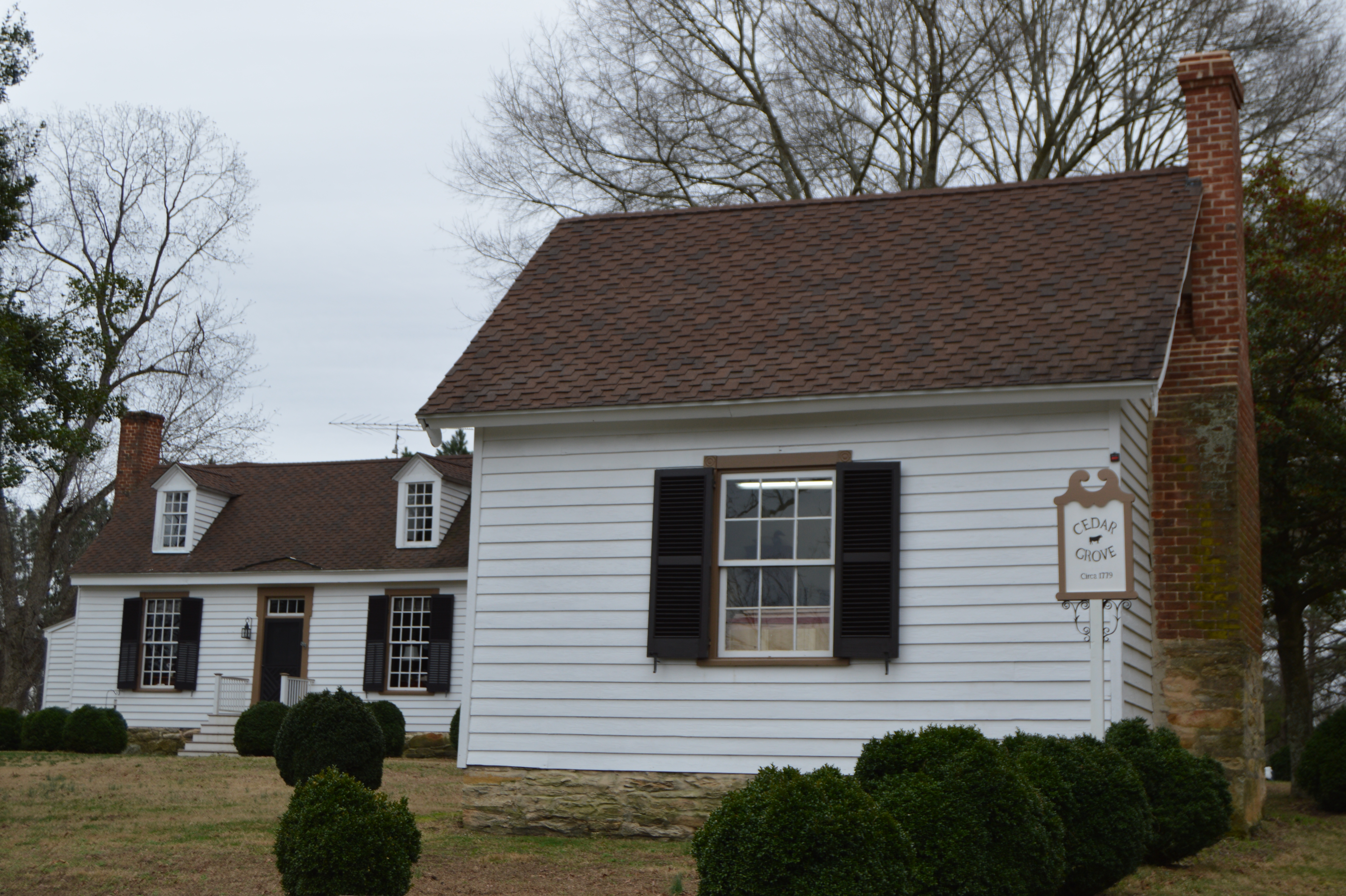
- House and office building

- Location within Virginia Location within the United States
- Location: 1083 Blanes Mill Rd., rural Halifax County, Virginia north of Alton
- Coordinates: 36°36′37″N 78°59′31″W
- Area: 91 acres (37 ha)
- Built: 1775; 251 years ago
- Architectural style: Federal; Greek Revival; Gothic Revival
- NRHP reference No.: 100001511
- Added to NRHP: August 28, 2017

Cedar Grove is a historic farm property at 1083 Blanes Mill Road in rural southern Halifax County, Virginia, north of Alton. The farm's main house is a two-story frame structure, estimated to have been built about 1775 but also altered several times in the 19th century. Its interior has a combination of Federal and Greek Revival features, and the domestic outbuildings of the property include an office with Greek and Gothic Revival features, and a small family cemetery. The house is believed to be one of the oldest surviving buildings in the county.

The property was listed on the National Register of Historic Places in 2017.

== See also ==
- National Register of Historic Places listings in Halifax County, Virginia
