= Reedy Creek Site =

Archaeological site in Virginia, United States

- U.S. National Register of Historic Places
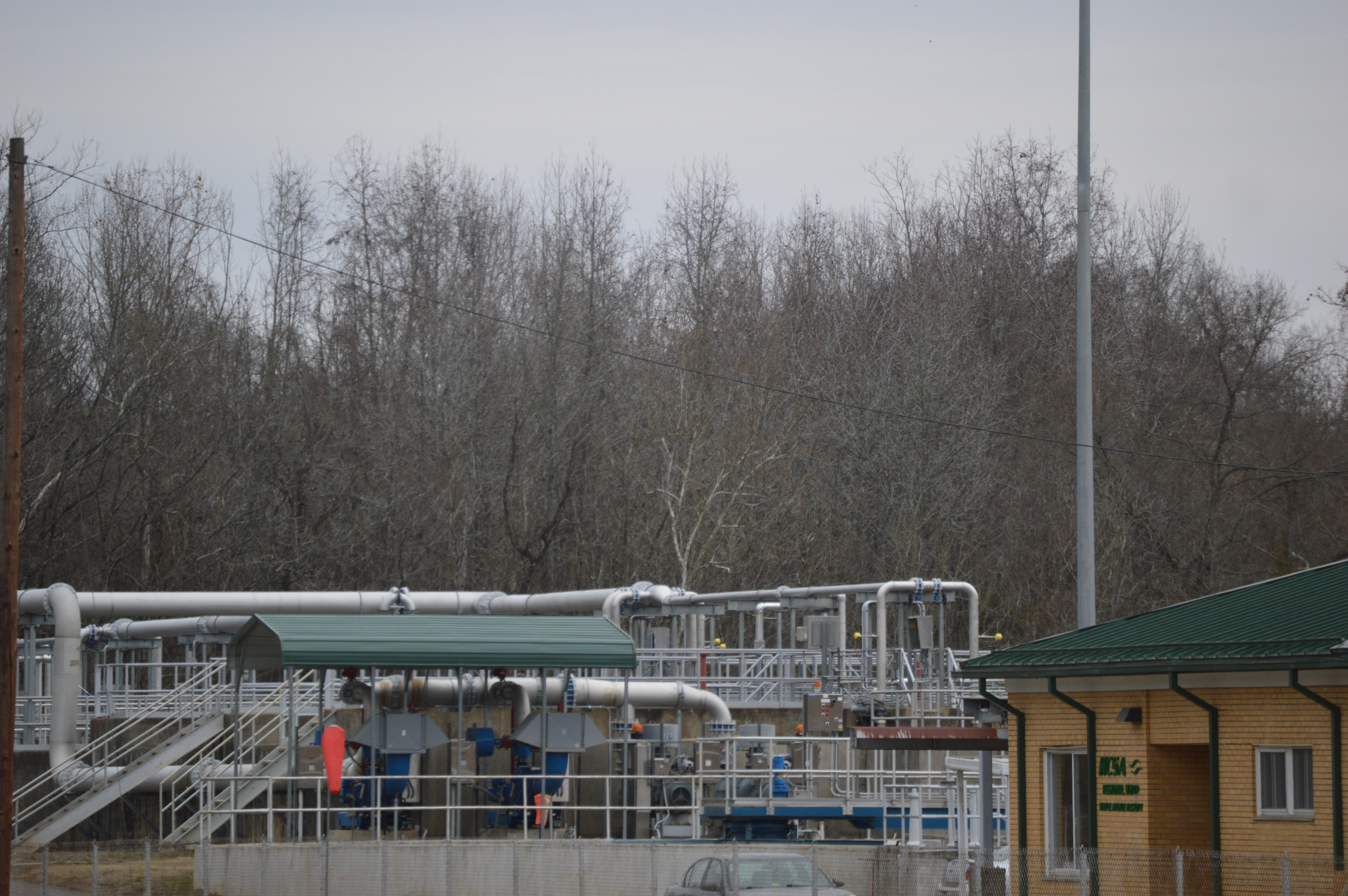
- Edge of the site, including the adjacent water treatment plant

- Location within Virginia Location within the United States
- Location: Northern side of the Dan River at the Reedy Creek confluence
- Nearest city: South Boston, Virginia
- Coordinates: 36°41′40″N 78°52′39″W
- Area: 5 acres (2.0 ha)
- NRHP reference No.: 78003187
- Added to NRHP: April 26, 1978

The Reedy Creek Site (44HA22) is a pre-Columbian archaeological site located in Halifax County, Virginia, near the town of South Boston. The site was first inhabited in the Late Archaic period from 2000 to 1000 B.C. Later, from 900 to 1400 A.D., a village was located at the site. Archaeological excavations at the site have revealed animal bones and seed and nut remnants, providing evidence as to the diet of the region's native inhabitants.

Excavations published in 1982 revealed burials, pottery, and the remnants of a settlement. The excavation, which only included selected portions of the site, discovered nine graves (one empty), in which skeletons were found in flexed positions; no grave goods were associated with the burials. The excavators recorded pottery of the Clements series, from the Middle Woodland period, and from the Clarksville series, from the Late Woodland period. During the latter occupation, the site seems to have been palisaded, as the excavators discovered lines of postmolds of regular depths and placed at regular intervals. No precise date could be ascertained for the Clarksville village, although similar sites indicate that palisades were first built in the region circa AD 1400.

The site was added to the National Register of Historic Places on April 26, 1978.

== See also ==
- National Register of Historic Places listings in Halifax County, Virginia
