= Pleasant Grove (Halifax, Virginia) =

- U.S. National Register of Historic Places
- U.S. Historic district
- Virginia Landmarks Register
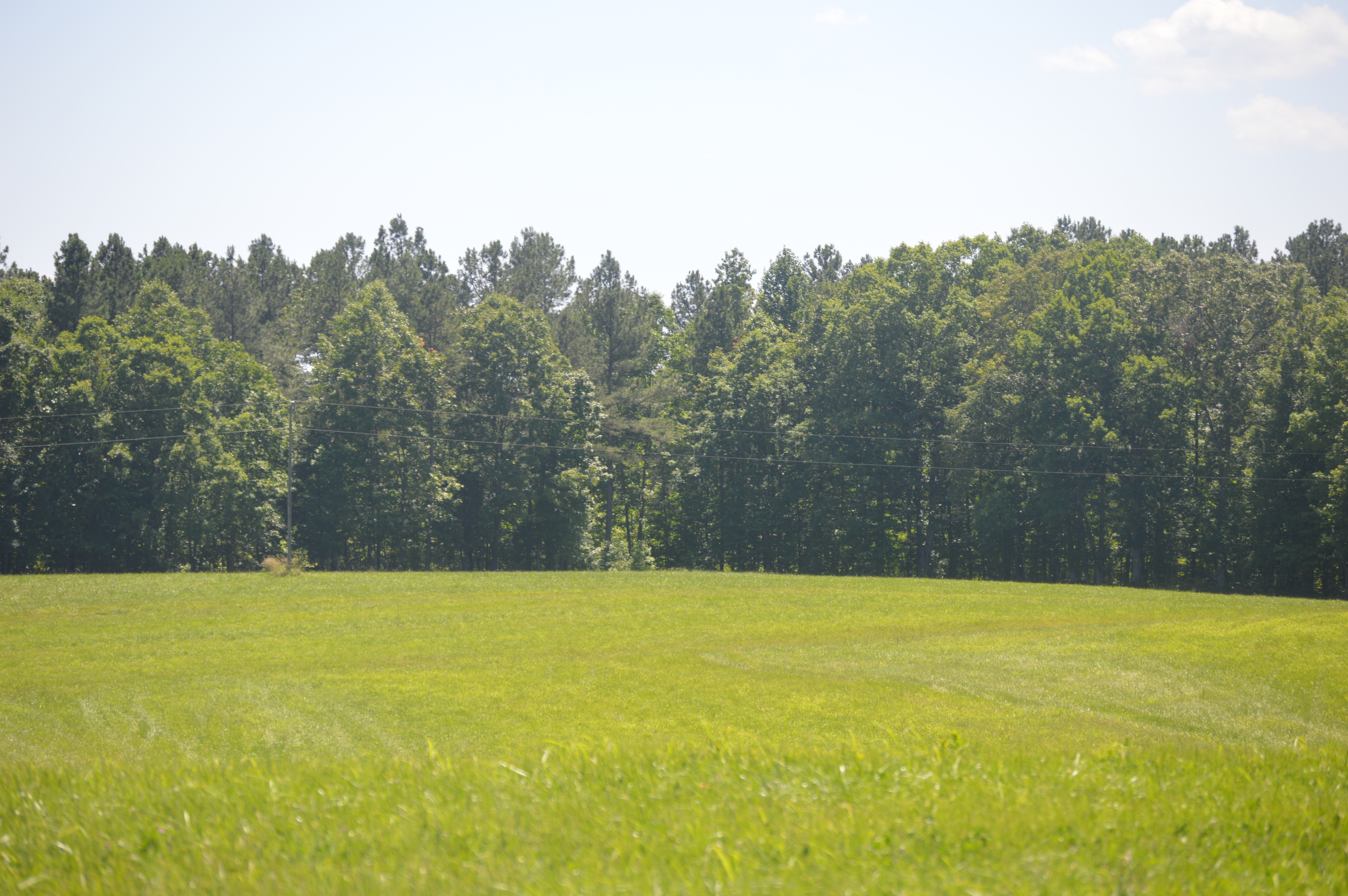
- Fields near the entrance to the estate

- Location within Virginia Location within the United States
- Location: Deer Run Rd., near Halifax, Virginia
- Coordinates: 36°43′14″N 79°02′55″W
- Area: 290 acres (120 ha)
- Built: 1888
- Architectural style: Gothic
- NRHP reference No.: 99000966
- VLR No.: 041-5033

Significant dates
- Added to NRHP: August 5, 1999
- Designated VLR: June 16, 1999

Pleasant Grove is a historic home and farm complex and national historic district located near Halifax, Halifax County, Virginia. The district includes 17 contributing buildings, 2 contributing sites, and 2 contributing structures on three farm complexes. They are the Main House Complex, Owen Tenant House Complex, and Ferrell Tenant House Complex. The main house was built in 1888–1890, and is a two-story Victorian style dwelling. Associated with it are the contributing smokehouse (c. 1940), pump house (c. 1940), watering trough (c. 1940), cow barn (c. 1940), granary (c. 1890), two corncribs (c. 1930), three tobacco barns (c. 1890), and a hog pen (c. 1930). The Owen Tenant House was built about 1900 and associated with it are a workshop (c. 1940), pumphouse (c. 1940), hog pen (c. 1940), and chicken house (c. 1940). The Ferrell Tenant House was built about 1940, and associated with it is a log corncrib (c. 1930). Also on the property are the ruins of the Blackstock Tenant House and a second tenant house ruin.

It was listed on the National Register of Historic Places in 1999.
