= Redfield (Oak Level, Virginia) =

Historic house in Virginia, United States

- U.S. National Register of Historic Places
- Virginia Landmarks Register
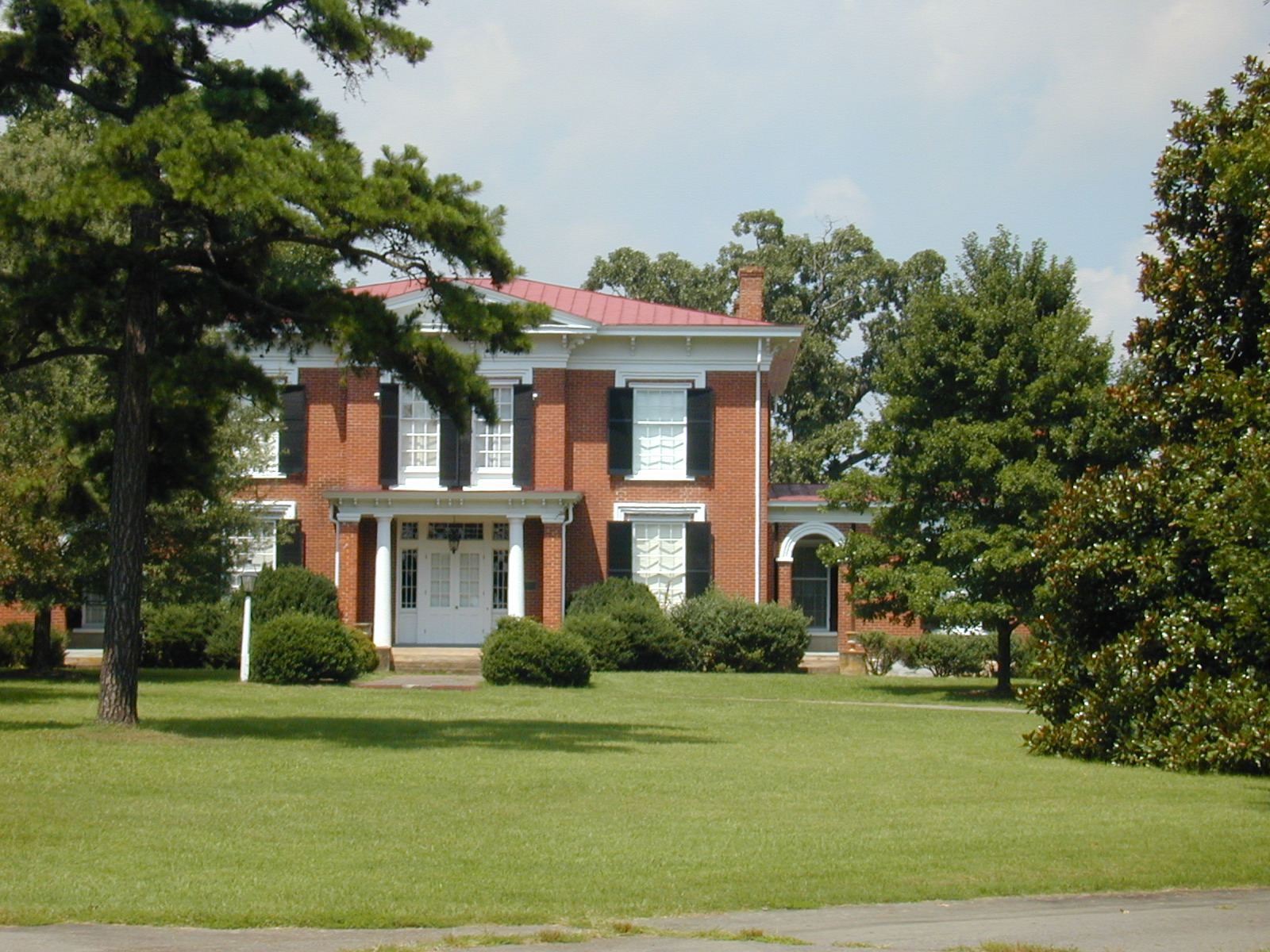

- Location within Virginia Location within the United States
- Location: 3 mi. SE of Oak Level on VA 683, near Oak Level, Virginia
- Coordinates: 36°42′03″N 79°04′41″W
- Area: 38 acres (15 ha)
- Built: 1855–1857; 169 years ago
- Architectural style: Classical Villa
- NRHP reference No.: 78003020
- VLR No.: 041-0047

Significant dates
- Added to NRHP: September 20, 1978
- Designated VLR: July 18, 1978

Redfield is a historic home located near Oak Level, Halifax County, Virginia. It was built in 1855–1857, and is a two-story, four-bay, central hall plan, hipped roofed brick dwelling in the Classical Villa style. The main block is flanked by one-story brick wings. The front facade features a two-story pavilion with a flat-roof portico supported by square brick piers which flank paired Grecian-Doric columns and set on a stone podium.

It was listed on the National Register of Historic Places in 1978.
