= Oak Level, Virginia =

- CDP
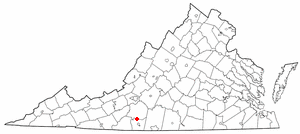
- Location of Oak Level, Virginia
- Coordinates: 36°47′51″N 79°56′22″W
- Country: United States
- State: Virginia
- County: Henry

Area
  - Total: 6.1 sq mi (15.8 km^{2})
  - Land: 6.1 sq mi (15.8 km^{2})
  - Water: 0 sq mi (0.0 km^{2})
- Elevation: 1,280 ft (390 m)

Population (2010)
  - Total: 857
  - Density: 140/sq mi (54.2/km^{2})
- Time zone: UTC−5 (Eastern (EST))
  - Summer (DST): UTC−4 (EDT)
- ZIP code: 24055
- Area code: 276
- FIPS code: 51-58312
- GNIS feature ID: 1471759

Oak Level is a census-designated place (CDP) in Henry County, Virginia, United States. As of the 2020 census, Oak Level had a population of 803. It is part of the Martinsville Micropolitan Statistical Area.

== History ==
Redfield was listed on the National Register of Historic Places in 1978.

== Geography ==
Oak Level is located at 36°47′51″N 79°56′22″W (36.797437, −79.939578).

According to the United States Census Bureau, the CDP has a total area of 6.1 square miles (15.8 km^{2}), all land.

== Demographics ==
As of the census of 2000, there were 885 people, 415 households, and 278 families residing in the CDP. The population density was 145.4 people per square mile (56.1/km^{2}). There were 465 housing units at an average density of 76.4/sq mi (29.5/km^{2}). The racial makeup of the CDP was 92.54% White, 7.12% African American, 0.11% Native American, 0.11% from other races, and 0.11% from two or more races. Hispanic or Latino of any race were 0.34% of the population.

There were 415 households, out of which 23.4% had children under the age of 18 living with them, 54.2% were married couples living together, 8.9% had a female householder with no husband present, and 33.0% were non-families. 30.4% of all households were made up of individuals, and 10.6% had someone living alone who was 65 years of age or older. The average household size was 2.13 and the average family size was 2.60.

In the CDP, the population was spread out, with 18.3% under the age of 18, 6.2% from 18 to 24, 26.4% from 25 to 44, 31.0% from 45 to 64, and 18.1% who were 65 years of age or older. The median age was 44 years. For every 100 females, there were 102.1 males. For every 100 females age 18 and over, there were 100.8 males.

The median income for a household in the CDP was $31,607, and the median income for a family was $38,250. Males had a median income of $26,429 versus $17,198 for females. The per capita income for the CDP was $20,439. About 5.7% of families and 8.8% of the population were below the poverty line, including 6.5% of those under age 18 and 9.1% of those age 65 or over.
