= Old Providence Presbyterian Church =

Historic church in Virginia, United States

- U.S. National Register of Historic Places
- Virginia Landmarks Register
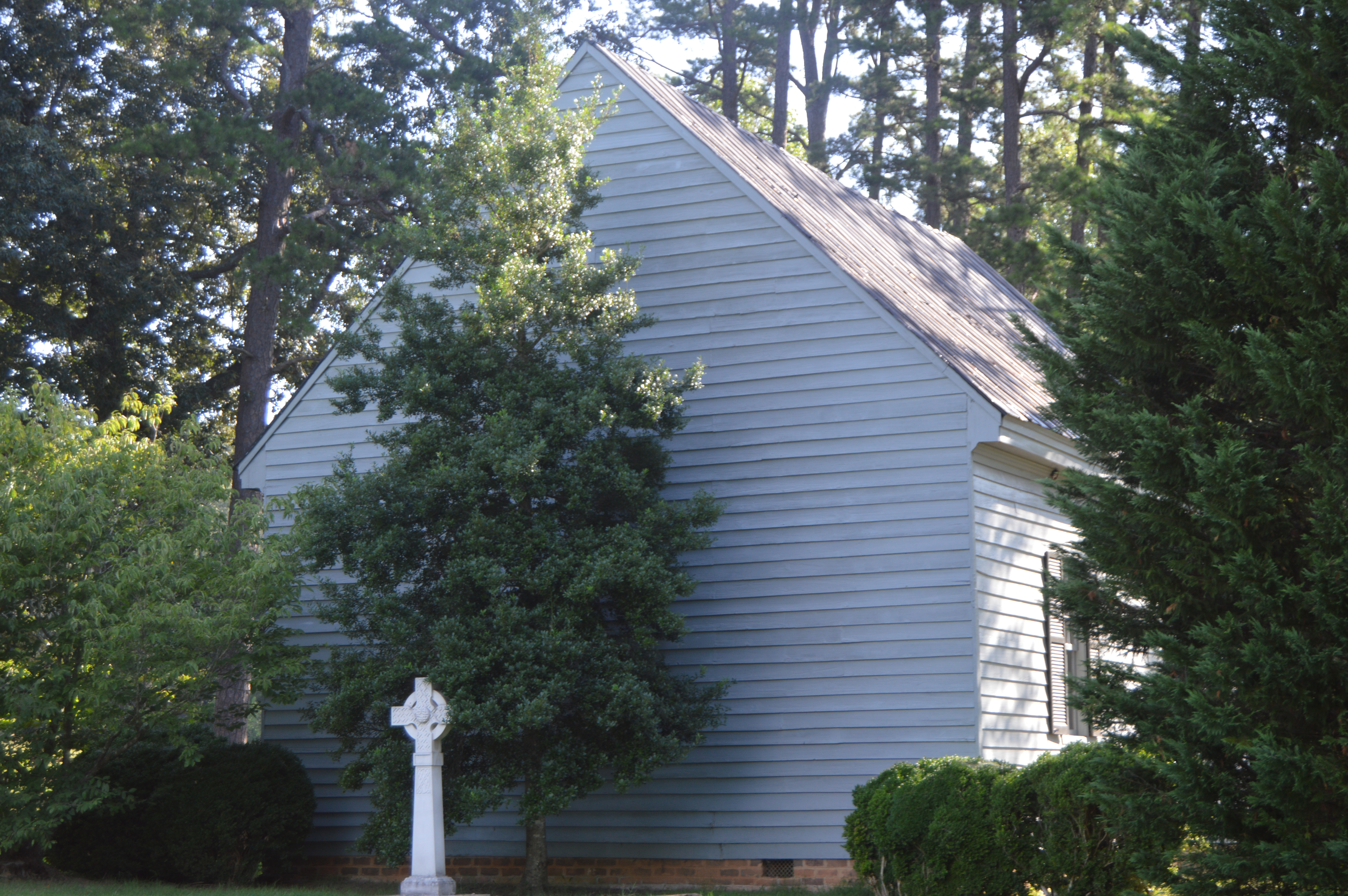
- Front and southern side

- Location within Virginia Location within the United States
- Location: VA 624, Providence, Virginia
- Coordinates: 36°56′15″N 78°49′11″W
- Area: 0.4 acres (0.16 ha)
- Built: c. 1830
- Architectural style: One-room plan
- NRHP reference No.: 88001013
- VLR No.: 041-0113

Significant dates
- Added to NRHP: July 7, 1988
- Designated VLR: December 8, 1987

Old Providence Presbyterian Church, also known as Halifax Presbyterian Church, is a historic Presbyterian church located at Providence, Halifax County, Virginia. It was built about 1830, and is a rectangular, one-story, single room, gable roofed frame structure. It measures approximately 26 feet by 31 feet.

It was listed on the National Register of Historic Places in 1988.
