= Carlbrook School =

Former school in Halifax, Virginia

Coordinates: 36°43′42″N 79°8′7″W

Location
- 3046 Carlbrook Rd; Halifax, Virginia 24592; United States

Information
- Type: Co-ed, Private, Boarding
- Established: 2002
- Closed: 2015
- CEEB code: 472108
- Academic Dean: Chris Soto, Ed.D.
- Faculty: 56 (80% post-baccalaureate)
- Grades: 9-12, PG.
- Enrollment: 80.
- Average class size: 8 students
- Student to teacher ratio: 6:1
- Campus: 200 acres (0.81 km^{2})
- Colors: Gold, Navy Blue
- Athletics: Intramural
- Accreditation: Southern Association of Colleges and Schools
- Admission: Rolling (year-round)
- Website: carlbrook.org

Carlbrook School was a private, abusive, coeducational, college preparatory boarding school located on 200 acres (0.81 km^{2}) in Halifax, Virginia. It was non-sectarian and covered grades 9 through 12. As of 2014, it reported an enrollment of 80 students The school closed permanently in December 2015. Carlbrook's mission statement was to help students discover, internalize and effectively use the intellectual and personal resources necessary to succeed in college and in life.

== History ==
Carlbrook was founded in early 2002 by Cascade school graduates Robert "Grant" Price, Jr. and Justin J. Merritt. Within the first week of their opening, there were seven students enrolled. By June 2003, it had grown to 89 students. All new students were required to complete a wilderness therapy program before enrolling. In 2003, a school official explained that wilderness programs help prepare students for success in the school program and function as a "filter," meaning that students who successfully complete these programs are more likely to succeed at Carlbrook. Grant hired several former CEDU staff to implement a similar emotional growth program.

On December 4, 2010, student Forest Ferguson was reported missing and his missing person case is still open in 2024.

=== Closure ===
The school closed in December 2015 after giving notice a few days before end of the fall semester. An incident involving a student that incited behavioral rebellion against the newly established headmaster contributed to future enrollment issues and a loss of faith in the program by families and students. the students had been asked to leave by the Sunday. The email announcement attributed the closure to declining enrollment. Carlbrook filed for chapter 11 bankruptcy shortly after closure.

== Admissions ==
Admission to Carlbrook was selective, focusing on students of high aptitude and potential who had struggled academically or socially in previous educational environments. Carlbrook was accredited by the Southern Association of Colleges and Schools and the Virginia Council for Private Education, and was a member of the Secondary School Admission Test Board, the Small Boarding Schools Association, and the Educational Records Bureau.

== Academics ==
The school followed a quarter-based academic calendar and awarded high school diplomas in accordance with Virginia Department of Education guidelines. There were multiple Advanced Placement courses and several advanced and dual-enrollment offerings; in addition to the school's academic requirements, graduating students were required to demonstrate leadership and character through extracurricular involvement and/or community service. Carlbrook reported that over the school's first decade, its graduates were accepted to over 500 colleges and universities.

== Carlbrook's Program ==
Carlbrook was a 15-month program which consisted of five workshops (Integritas, Amicitia, Animus, Teneo, and Veneratio) which took place roughly every three months depending on the child's arrival at the school. Elizabeth Gilpin, who is a graduate of Carlbrook School, makes the following claim in Stolen, a memoir about her time there:

At CEDU they weren't called workshops, they were "propheets." In their very first form, they were "trips," a word chosen for its association with psychedelics. Chuck Dederich wanted to induce an altered state of consciousness. An acid trip without the acid. Because there could be no drug use in Synanon, he created a mocktail from ingredients like sleep deprivation, repetitive music, and group hypnosis. In the hands of Mel Wasserman, they became even more insidious. His plan? Add another cult! Many of the workshop exercises were taken straight from the large-group awareness trainings that were a controversial part of the Human Potential Movement. Programs like est and Lifespring—which themselves developed from Dianetics—would bring groups of people together for several days of intense personal growth work. Techniques included hypnosis, guided meditation, and referring to people as "asshole"—an est specialty that fit in nicely with the CEDU model.

== In the news ==
- December 4, 2010: 16-year-old Forest Ferguson disappeared from Carlbrook School's campus in South Boston, Virginia. He was never found.
- April 2017: Life Boat, a short film based on the exercise used in Animus, Carlbrook's third workshop, premiered at Tribeca Film Festival. It was directed by Jack Nicholson's daughter, Lorraine Nicholson, and stars Carlbrook graduate and author of Stolen, Elizabeth Gilpin.
- July 20, 2021: Stolen, a memoir by Elizabeth Gilpin about the time she spent in the wilderness of the Appalachian Mountains and then at Carlbrook School was published.
