= The Cove (Harrisburg, Virginia) =

Historic house in Virginia, United States

- U.S. National Register of Historic Places
- Virginia Landmarks Register
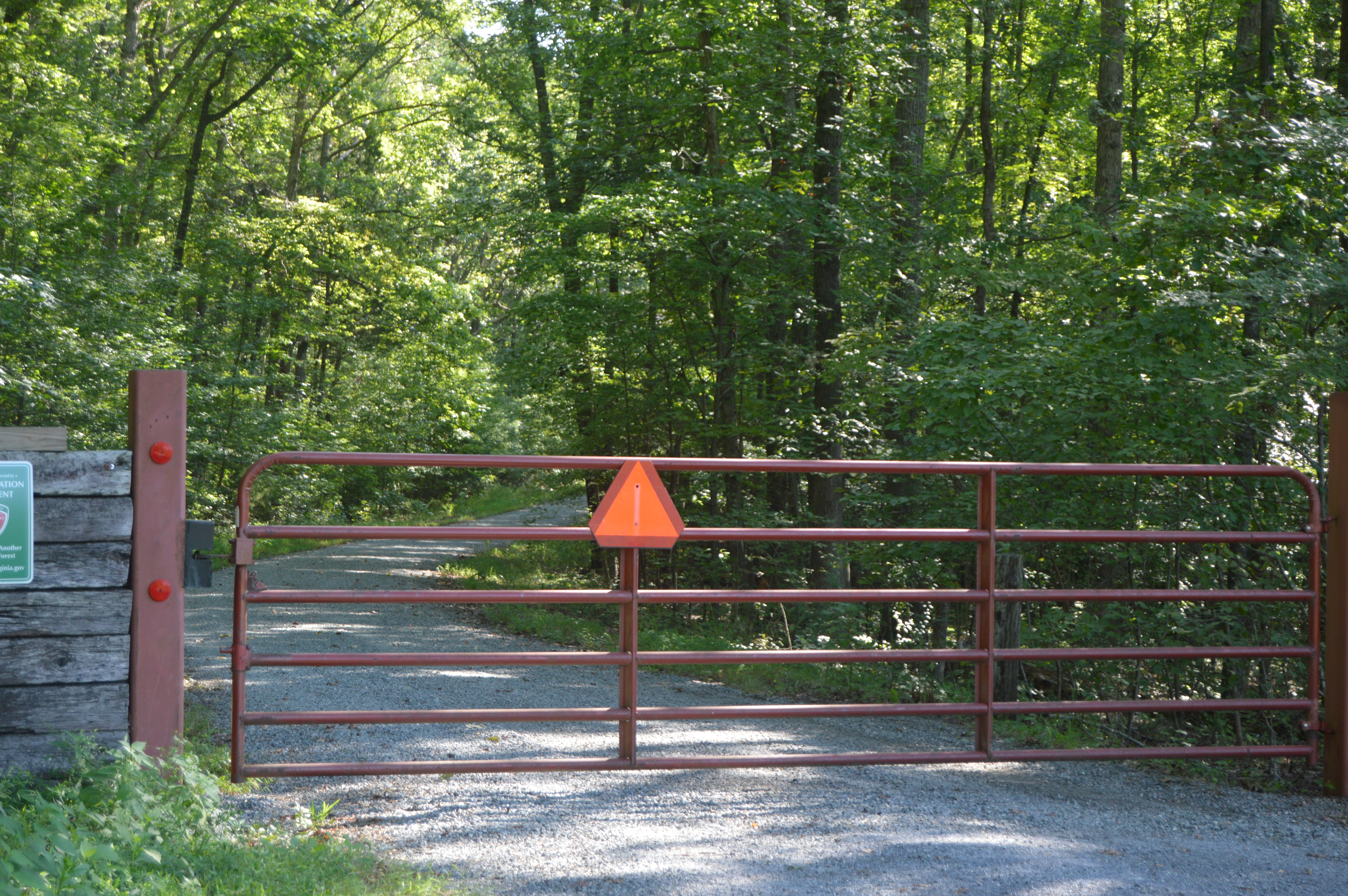
- Entrance to the property

- Location within Virginia Location within the United States
- Location: 5059 Cove Rd., near Harrisburg, Virginia
- Coordinates: 36°58′58″N 78°44′51″W
- Area: 1,123 acres (454 ha)
- Built: 1773
- NRHP reference No.: 06000407
- VLR No.: 041-5086

Significant dates
- Added to NRHP: May 11, 2006
- Designated VLR: August 21, 1991

The Cove is a historic plantation house located near Harrisburg, in Halifax County, Virginia. The main house was built about 1773, and is a 1 1/2-story, vernacular frame dwelling with a gable roof and flanking stone chimneys. Also on the property are the contributing two secondary dwellings, a hay barn, and two log tobacco barns (one of which has been converted to a dwelling); and sites including the ruins of four log barns, three chimneys, an ice house, a frame barn, a frame shed, a log house, and what are believed to be at least two slave quarters and an archeological site.

It was listed on the National Register of Historic Places in 2006.
