= Black Walnut (Clover, Virginia) =

Historic house in Virginia, United States

- Black Walnut Plantation
- U.S. National Register of Historic Places
- Virginia Landmarks Register
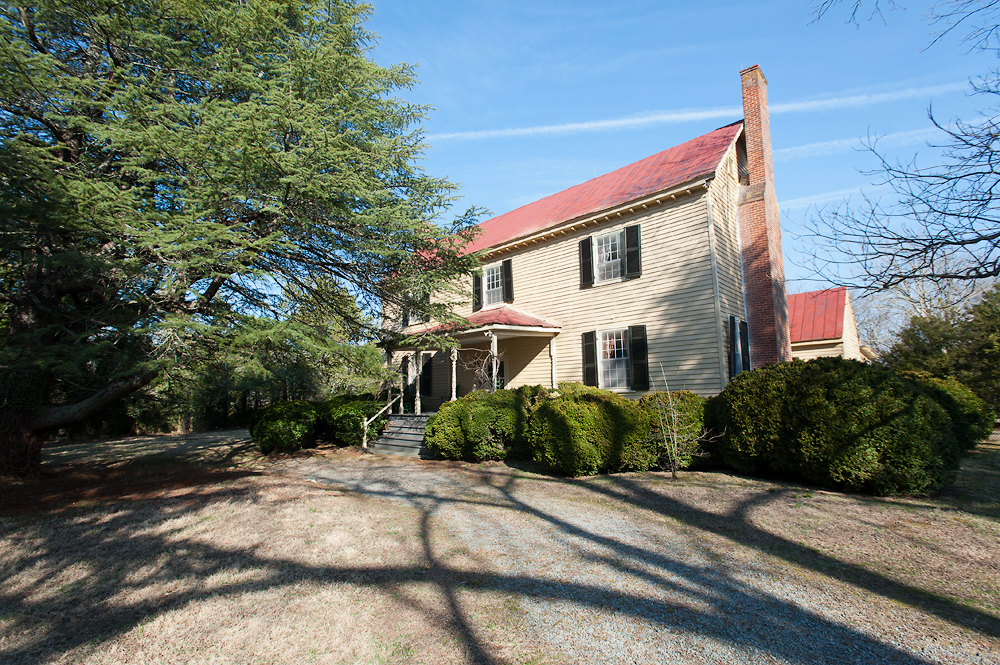
- Black Walnut Manor House

- Location within Virginia Location within the United States
- Location: 2091 Black Walnut Road, Clover, VA 24534 (VA 600, 850 ft. S of jct. with VA 778, in Halifax County, Virginia)
- Coordinates: 36°51′47″N 78°43′22″W
- Area: 8 acres (3.2 ha)
- Built: 1774
- Architectural style: Greek Revival, Georgian
- NRHP reference No.: 91001597
- VLR No.: 041-0006

Significant dates
- Added to NRHP: October 29, 1991
- Designated VLR: August 21, 1991

Black Walnut is a historic plantation house and farm located near Clover, Halifax County, Virginia. The main house was built in at least three sections beginning about 1774 to 1790. In the 1840s and 1850s, a substantial two-story frame addition was built in two stages parallel to the existing house, along with a connecting hyphen, altogether giving the house an H-shape. The interior features Greek Revival style details.

Also on the property are the contributing brick kitchen, a dairy, a wash-house, two smokehouses, two sheds, a cool-storage building, a privy, a stable, a barn, a slave cabin, a corncrib, two machine sheds, a toolshed, a garage, a late 18th-century schoolhouse, and the family cemetery.

At its peak, Black Walnut Plantation was one of the largest and most successful plantations in Halifax County. The only Civil War battle fought in Halifax County, the Battle of Staunton River Bridge, took place on Black Walnut Plantation in Summer 1864. Confederate troops maintained encampment there during the war alongside up to 800 Confederate slave laborers.

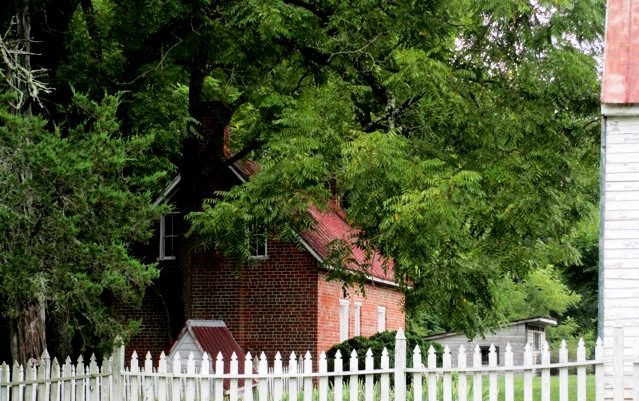
Brick Kitchen, Built ~1800

During the September 1939 National Tobacco Festival, Academy Award Winner Mary Pickford visited Black Walnut as Queen of the festival.

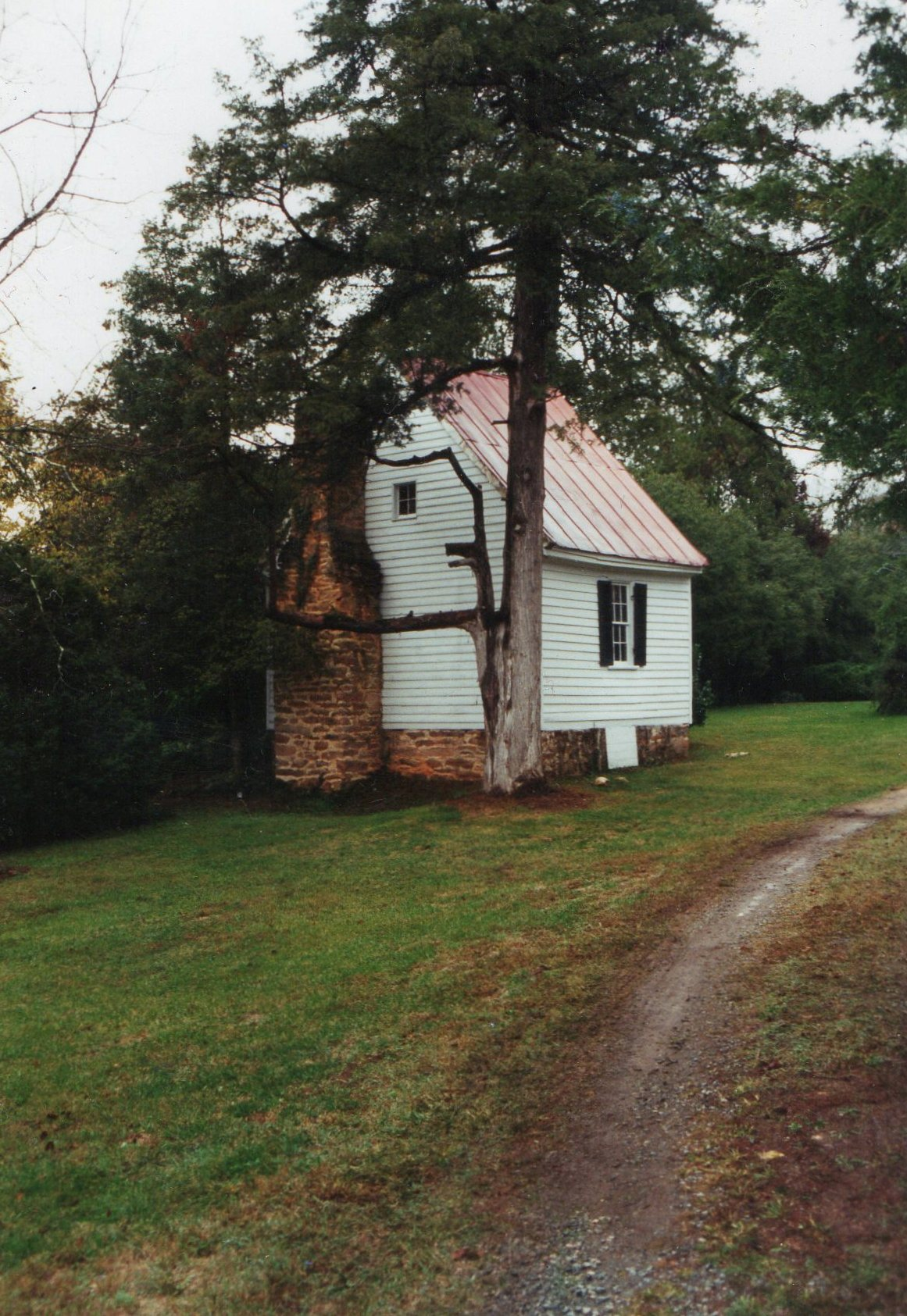
Black Walnut Plantation School House, Built ~1774

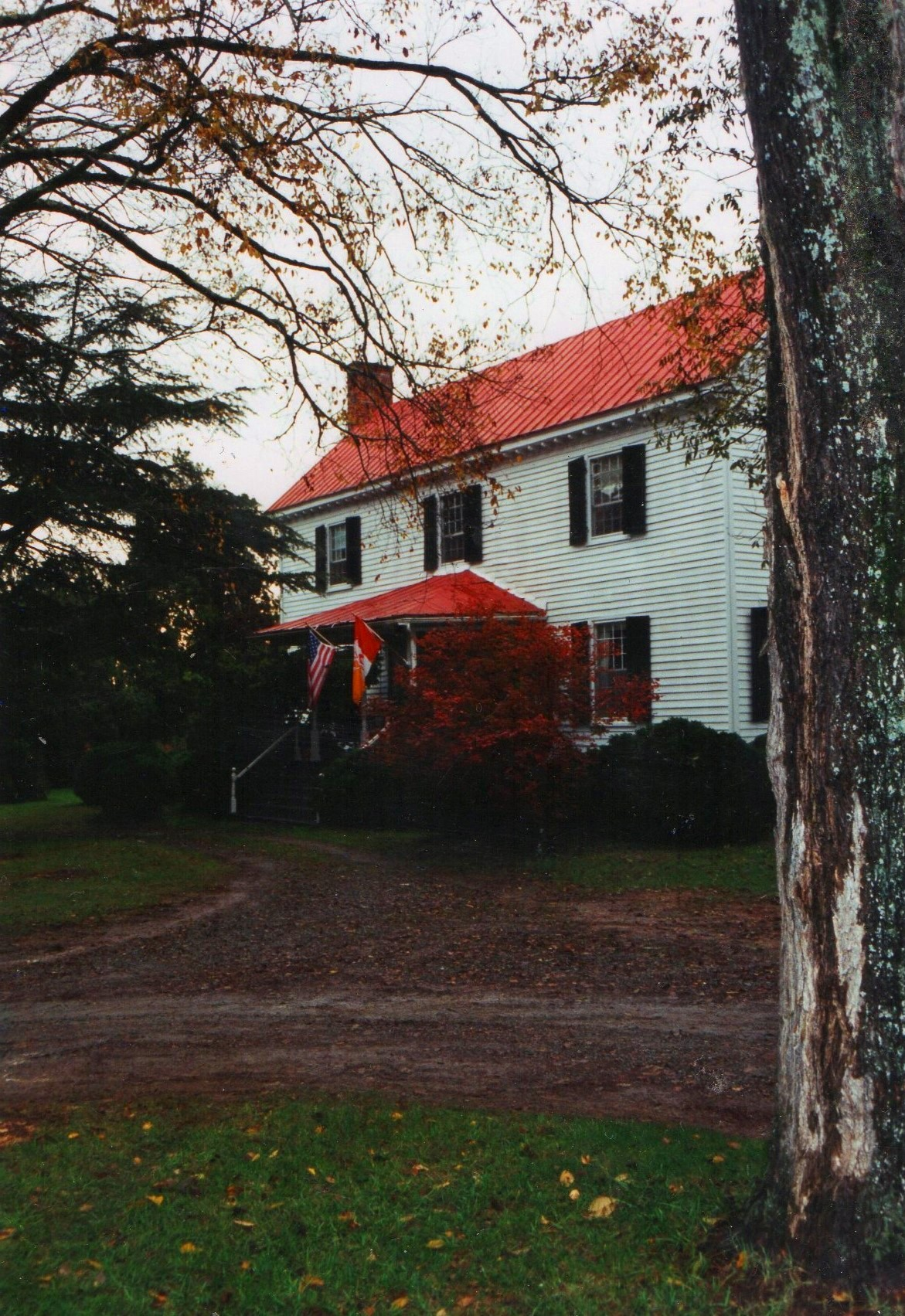
Black Walnut Plantation Manor House

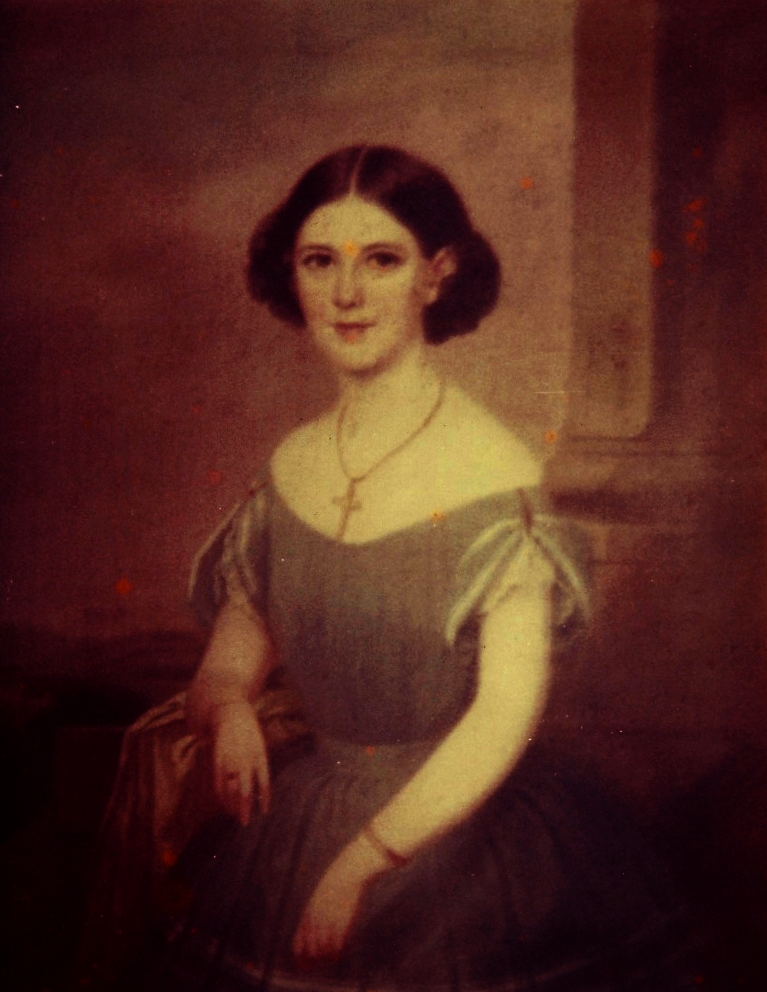
Mary Garrett Vest Watkins, Daughter of Maria Sims & Benjamin Garrett.

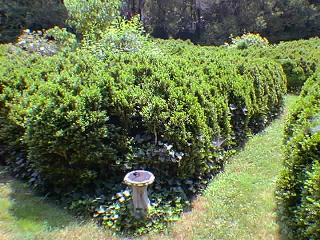
An English Boxwood maze garden at Black Walnut Plantation.

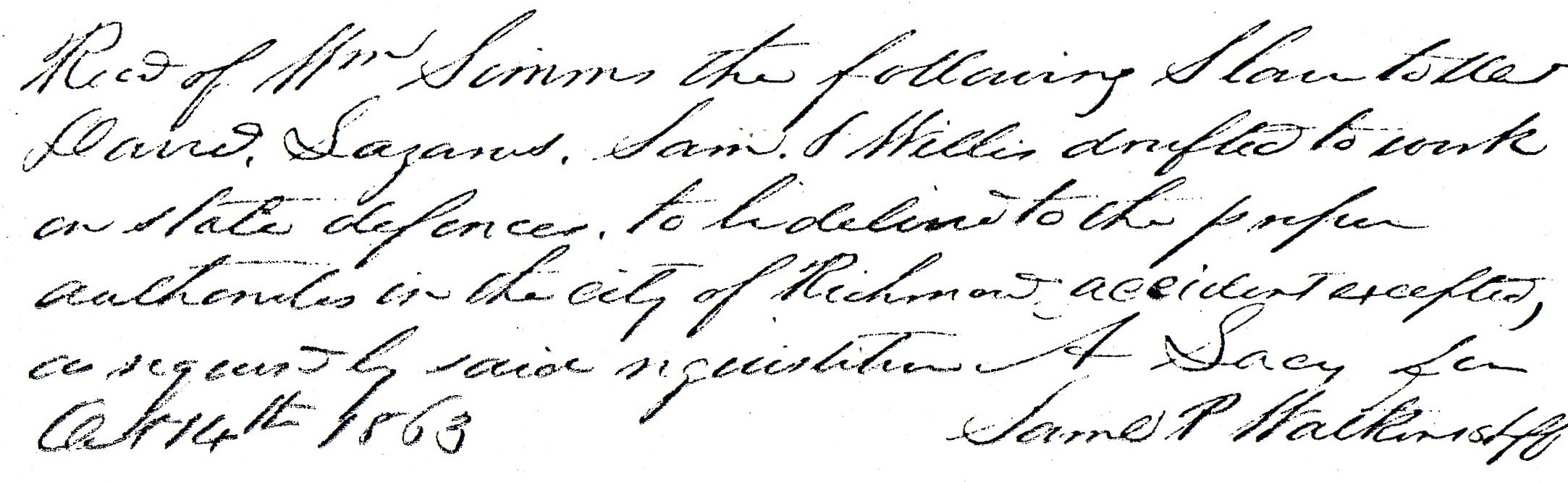
Receipt for drafted slaves from Black Walnut Plantation

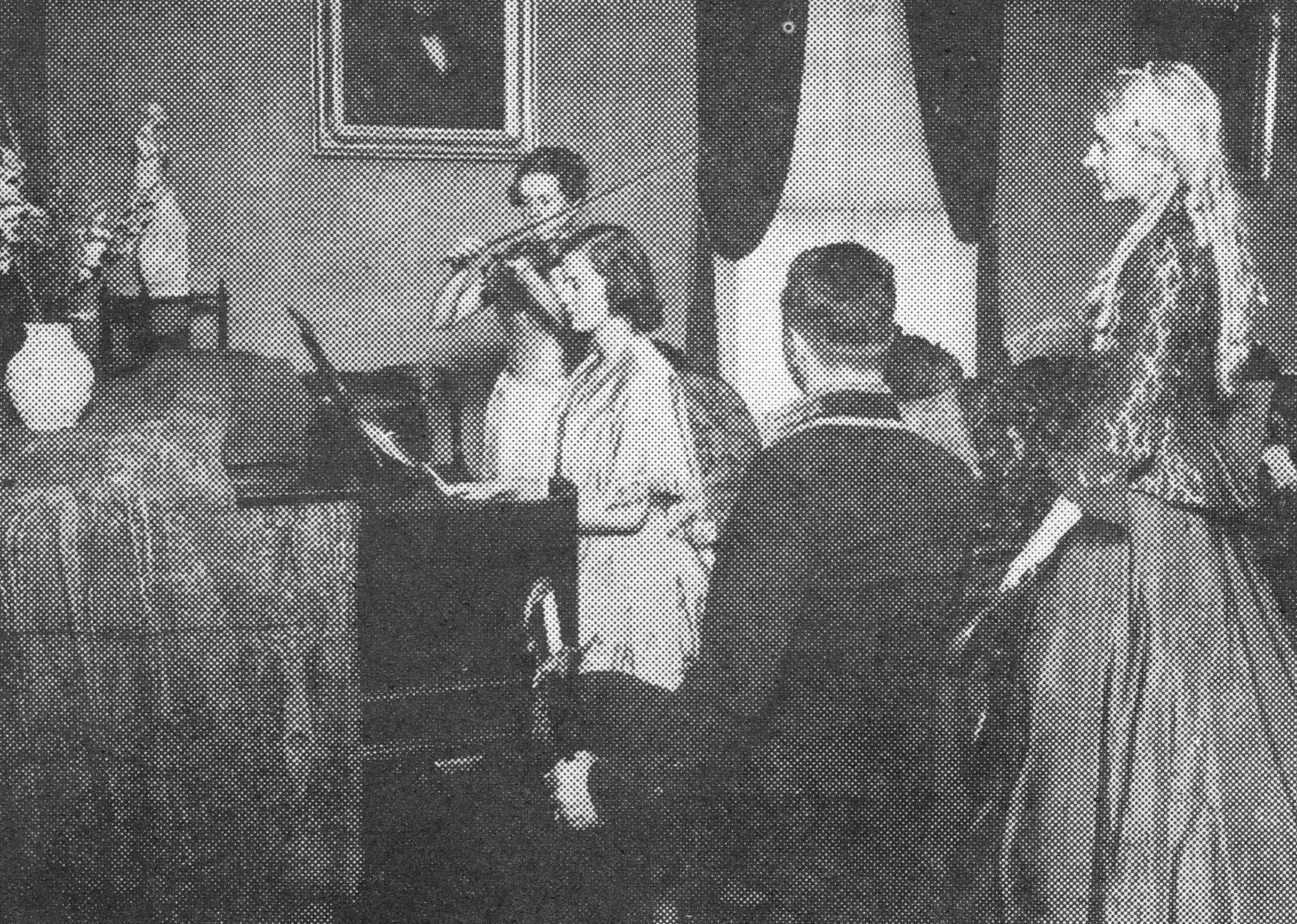
Black Walnut Parlor - 1939 National Tobacco Festival.

== Reconstruction - Present ==
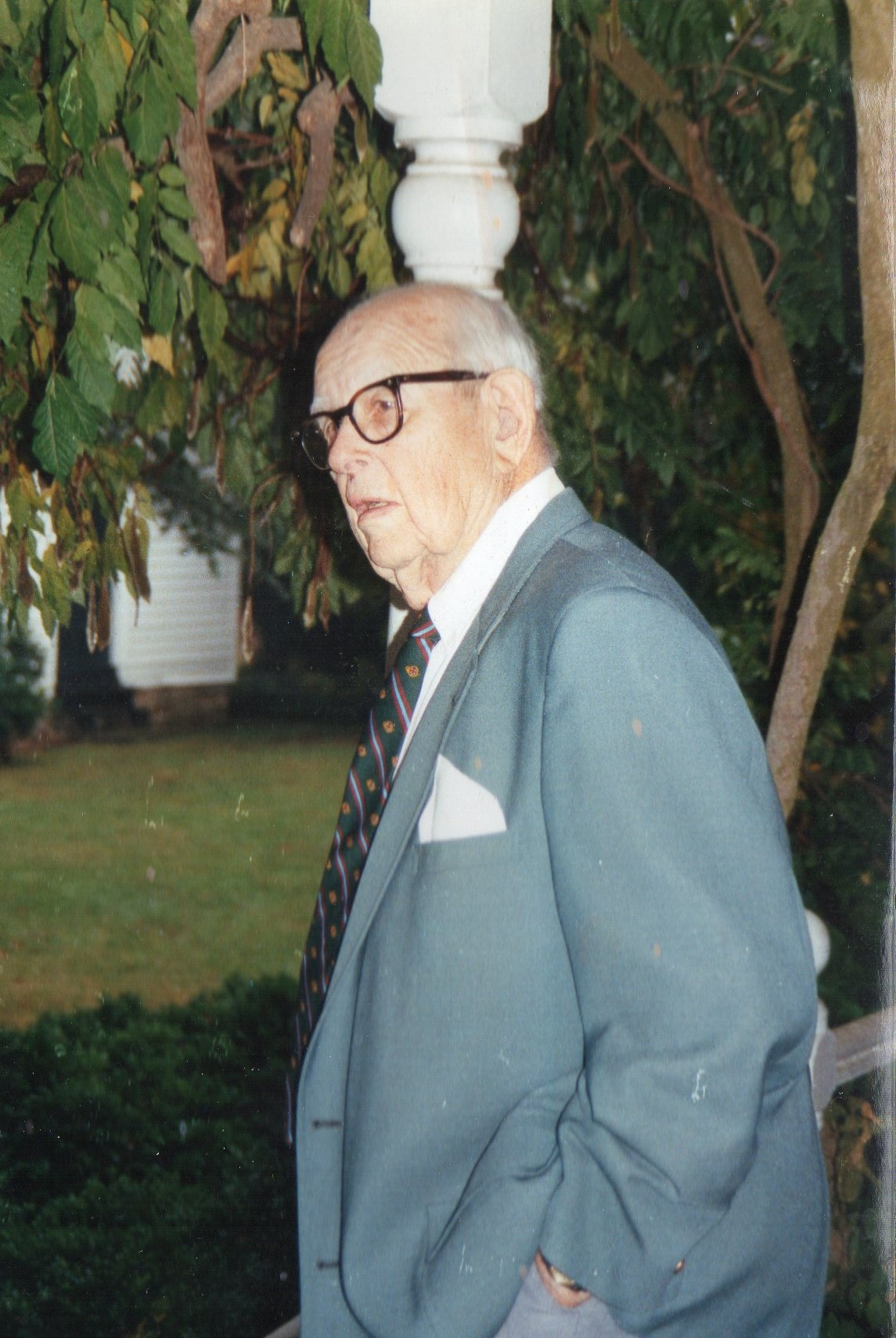
Dr. William Watkins at Black Walnut Plantation

After Tucker Carrington Watkins IV, the occupant, died on 6 October 2012, his nephew John Payne Thrift III decided to auction off the contents of the house and sell the 775-acre (314-hectare) property for $2,050,000 in 2014, as no-one in the family had an interest in living there. This marked the first time the house had been on the market since 1768.
