= Clarkton Bridge =

Historic bridge in Virginia, United States

- U.S. National Register of Historic Places
- Virginia Landmarks Register
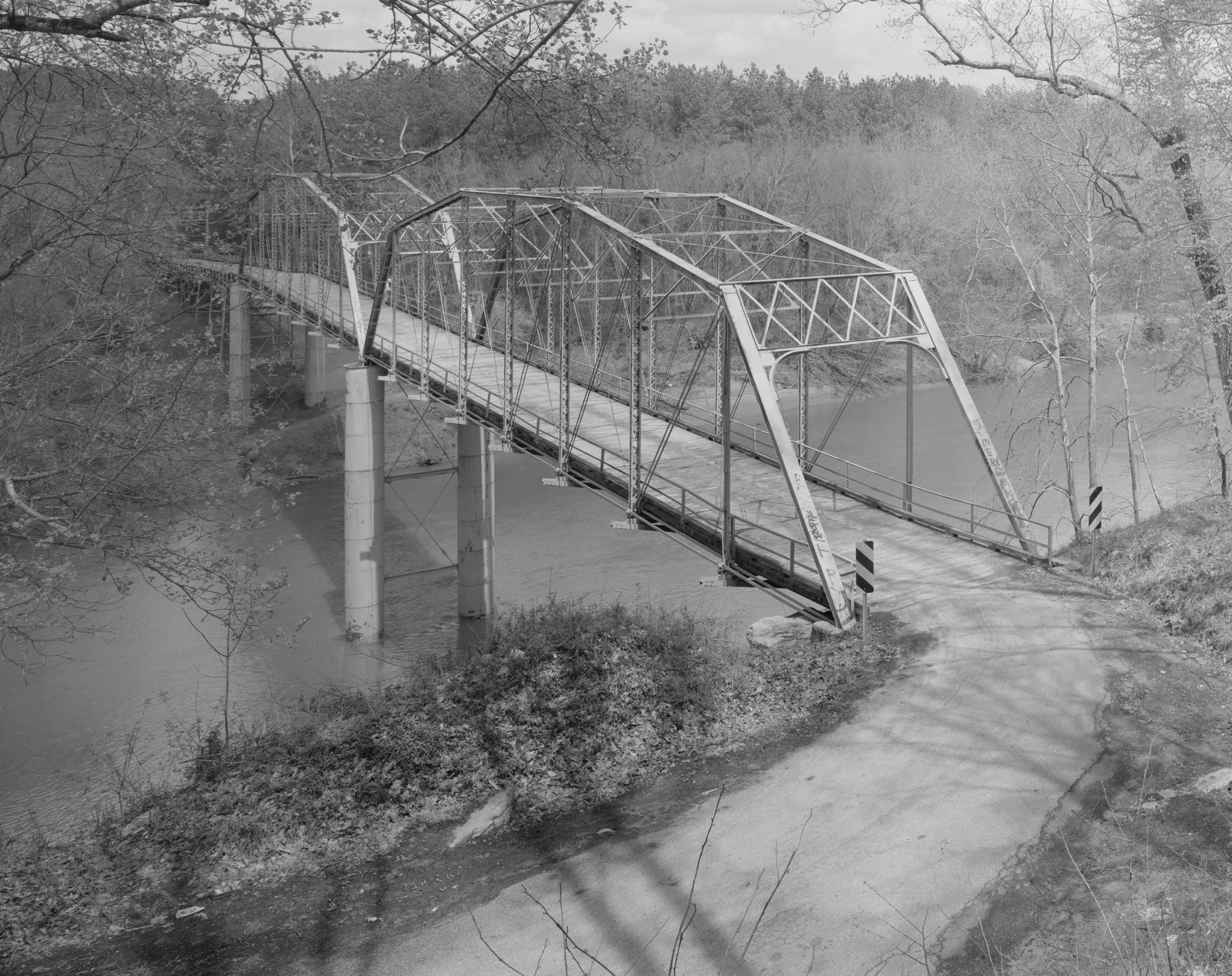

- Location within Virginia Location within the United States
- Location: VA 620 over the Staunton R, near Nathalie, Virginia
- Coordinates: 36°58′49″N 78°53′34″W
- Area: 0.3 acres (0.12 ha)
- Built: 1902; 124 years ago
- Built by: Virginia Bridge & Iron Co.
- Architectural style: Pratt through truss
- Demolished: October 2018; 7 years ago
- NRHP reference No.: 06000747
- VLR No.: 019-0086

Significant dates
- Added to NRHP: January 26, 2007
- Designated VLR: June 8, 2006

Clarkton Bridge was a historic Pratt truss bridge located over the Staunton River near Nathalie, in Charlotte County, Virginia. It was built in 1902 by the Virginia Bridge & Iron Co., and was the only remaining metal truss structure in Virginia built for highway purposes, which was supported by steel cylinder piers. It consisted of two camelback, pin-connected steel through truss channel spans, and twelve steel deck beam approach spans. The overall dimensions of the bridge approach and truss spans were as follows: north approach, 370 feet (110 m) with twelve deck spans; north truss, 150 feet (46 m); south truss, 150 feet (46 m). The total length of the bridge was 692 feet (211 m).

The bridge was listed on the National Register of Historic Places in 2006. It was demolished in October 2018 by the J. B. Fay Company of Pittsburgh, Pennsylvania.

== See also ==
- List of bridges documented by the Historic American Engineering Record in Virginia
- List of bridges on the National Register of Historic Places in Virginia
