= Harrisburg, Virginia =

Unincorporated community in Virginia, US

Coordinates: 37.026533°N 78.747783°W

Harrisburg is a small unincorporated community in Charlotte County, Virginia, United States. Its elevation is 548 feet (167 m).

The Cove was listed on the National Register of Historic Places in 2006.
