= Brooklyn Store and Post Office =

Historic commercial building in Virginia, United States

- U.S. National Register of Historic Places
- Virginia Landmarks Register
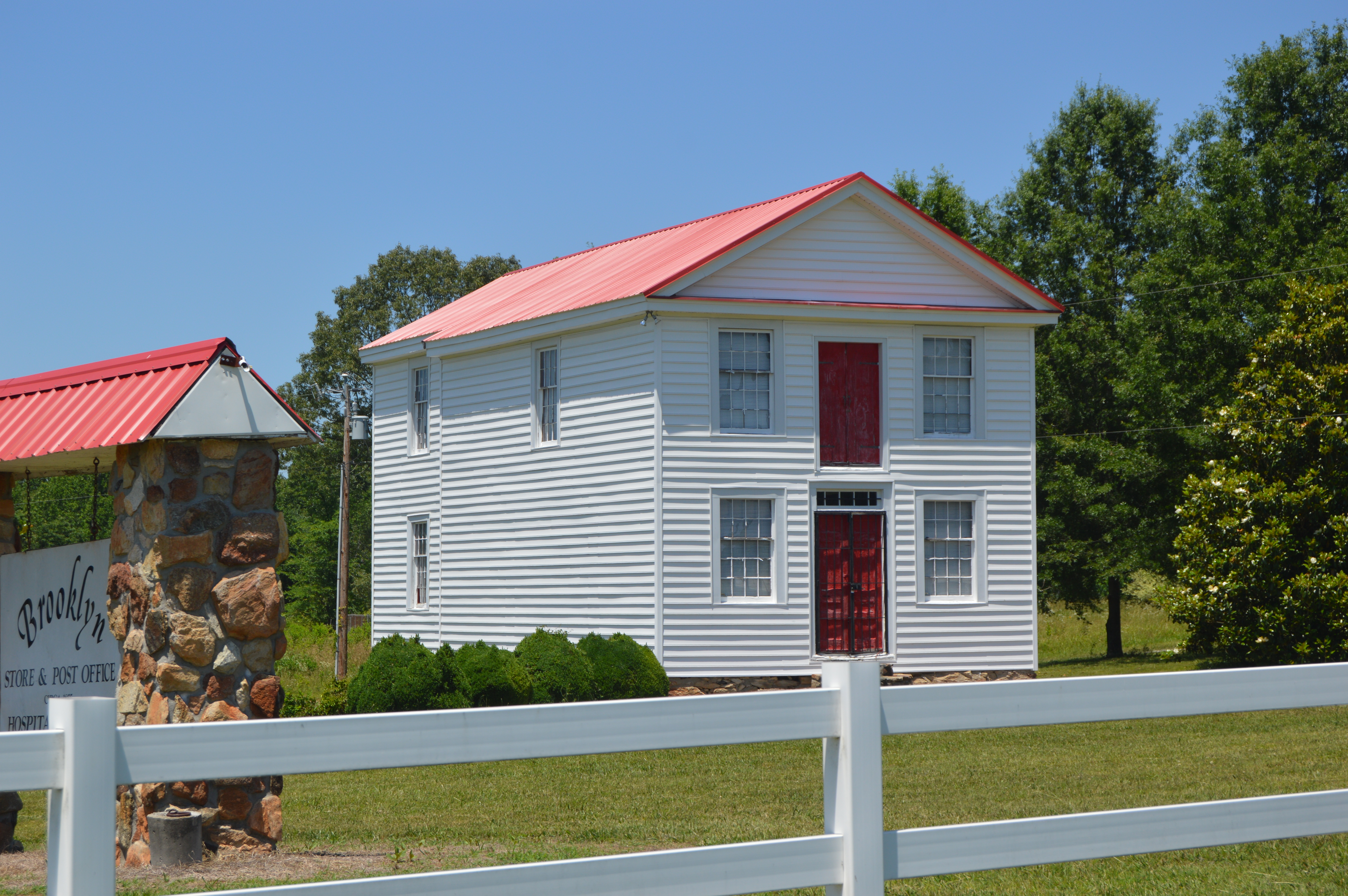
- Front and western side

- Location within Virginia Location within the United States
- Location: Northern side of River Road, 0.1 mile west of its junction with Jeremy Creek Road, at Brooklyn, Virginia
- Coordinates: 36°40′37″N 79°9′4″W
- Area: 0.5 acres (0.20 ha)
- Built: 1850
- Architectural style: Greek Revival
- NRHP reference No.: 95001557
- VLR No.: 041-0007

Significant dates
- Added to NRHP: January 22, 1996
- Designated VLR: October 18, 1995

Brooklyn Store and Post Office is a historic country store and post office located at Brooklyn, Halifax County, Virginia. It was built about 1850, and is a two-story, frame building. It features a Greek Revival pedimented front gable with its flush-board tympanum. The store operated in conjunction with the nearby Brooklyn Tobacco Factory, serving the small community of Brooklyn and surrounding farms. The store and post office remained in operation until 1903.

It was listed on the National Register of Historic Places in 1996.
