= C. Bascom Slemp Federal Building =

- U.S. Post Office and Courthouse
- U.S. National Register of Historic Places
- Virginia Landmarks Register
- C. Bascom Slemp Federal Building

- Location within Virginia
- Location: 322 Wood Ave. E. Big Stone Gap, Virginia
- Coordinates: 36°51′59″N 82°46′30″W
- Area: less than one acre
- Built: 1911-1913
- Architect: James Knox Taylor
- Architectural style: Late 19th And 20th Century Revivals, Second Renaissance Revival
- NRHP reference No.: 75002043
- VLR No.: 101-0004

Significant dates
- Added to NRHP: December 23, 1975
- Designated VLR: October 21, 1975

The C. Bascom Slemp Federal Building, also known as the Big Stone Gap Post Office and U.S. Post Office and Courthouse, is a historic courthouse and post office building located in Big Stone Gap, Wise County, Virginia. It was designed by the Office of the Supervising Architect under James Knox Taylor and built between 1911 and 1913. It is a three-story, seven-bay, stone building with a low hipped roof in the Second Renaissance Revival style. The front facade features a three-bay Tuscan order portico consisting of four pairs of coupled, unfluted columns. The building is named for Congressman C. Bascom Slemp.

It was listed on the National Register of Historic Places in 1975.
