= Paces, Virginia =

Unincorporated community in Virginia, United States

Coordinates: 36°38′43″N 79°05′55″W

Paces is an unincorporated community in Halifax County, Virginia, United States.

== History ==
A post office called Pace was established in 1882, and remained in operation until 1965. The community has the name of one Mr. Pace, who donated land to the railroad in exchange for the naming rights.
