= Nathalie, Virginia =

- Census-designated place
- Location within Virginia Location within the United States
- Coordinates: 36°56′06″N 78°56′50″W
- Country: United States
- State: Virginia
- County: Halifax

Area
  - Total: 3.00 sq mi (7.77 km^{2})
  - Land: 2.98 sq mi (7.71 km^{2})
  - Water: 0.023 sq mi (0.06 km^{2})
- Elevation: 1,818 ft (554 m)

Population (2010)
  - Total: 183
  - Density: 61/sq mi (23.7/km^{2})
- Time zone: UTC−5 (Eastern (EST))
  - Summer (DST): UTC−4 (EDT)
- ZIP code: 24577
- Area code: 434
- FIPS code: 51-55000
- GNIS feature ID: 1497035

Nathalie is an unincorporated community and census-designated place (CDP) in Halifax County, Virginia, United States, in the south-central region of the state. As of the 2020 census, Nathalie had a population of 173.

== Geography ==
Located in northern Halifax County at 36°56′6″N 78°56′50″W (36.9348619, −78.9472347), at an altitude of 524 feet (160 m), it lies along Road 603, 15 miles (24 km) north of the town of Halifax, the county seat of Halifax County. According to the U.S. Census Bureau, the CDP has a total area of 3.0 square miles (7.8 km^{2}), of which 0.02 square miles (0.06 km^{2}), or 0.76%, are water. The community is drained by tributaries of Catawba Creek, which flows northeast to the Roanoke River at Clarkton.

== History ==
It received its name in 1890 or 1891, being named after Natalie Otey (not "Nathalie"), daughter of Mrs. Rebecca Wimbish, an important local landowner. Prior to that time, the village at this location was considered to be a part of the Nathaniel Barksdale plantation. It had included a church since 1773 (the first Catawba Baptist Church) and a post office since 1828. This post office continues to operate today with the ZIP code of 24577.

The former Clarkton Bridge over the Roanoke or "Staunton" River 4 miles (6 km) northeast of town was listed on the National Register of Historic Places in 2006.

== Demographics ==
Historical population
Census	Pop.	Note	%±
2010	183		—
2020	173		−5.5%
U.S. Decennial Census; 2010 2020

Nathalie was first listed as a census designated place in the 2010 U.S. census.
