= Halifax, Virginia =

- Town
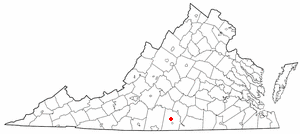
- Location of Halifax, Virginia
- Coordinates: 36°45′53″N 78°55′41″W
- Country: United States
- State: Virginia
- County: Halifax

Area
  - Total: 3.83 sq mi (9.92 km^{2})
  - Land: 3.78 sq mi (9.80 km^{2})
  - Water: 0.046 sq mi (0.12 km^{2})
- Elevation: 495 ft (151 m)

Population (2020)
  - Total: 1,118
  - Estimate (2019): 1,210
  - Density: 319.7/sq mi (123.45/km^{2})
- Time zone: UTC-5 (Eastern (EST))
  - Summer (DST): UTC-4 (EDT)
- ZIP code: 24558
- Area code: 434
- FIPS code: 51-34064
- GNIS feature ID: 1502794
- Website: townofhalifax.com

Halifax is a town in Halifax County, Virginia, United States, along the Banister River. As of the 2020 census, Halifax had a population of 1,118. It is the county seat of Halifax County.

== History ==
Halifax County Courthouse, Mountain Road Historic District, Pleasant Grove, and the Town of Halifax Court House Historic District are listed on the National Register of Historic Places.

== Geography ==
Halifax is located at the center of Halifax County, at 36°45′53″N 78°55′41″W (36.764593, -78.928081). Its northern border is the Banister River, an eastward-flowing tributary of the Dan River and part of the Roanoke River watershed.

U.S. Route 501 passes through the town on Main Street, leading south 5 miles (8 km) to South Boston and north 55 miles (89 km) to Lynchburg. Virginia State Route 360 joins US 501 along North Main Street but leads east 7 miles (11 km) to U.S. Route 360 near Scottsburg and west 35 miles (56 km) to Danville.

According to the United States Census Bureau, Halifax has a total area of 3.8 square miles (9.9 km^{2}), of which 3.8 square miles (9.8 km^{2}) are land and 0.04 square miles (0.1 km^{2}), or 1.21%, are water.

== Demographics ==
Historical population
Census	Pop.	Note	%±
1880	621		—
1890	1,285		106.9%
1900	687		−46.5%
1910	516		−24.9%
1920	411		−20.3%
1930	473		15.1%
1940	536		13.3%
1950	791		47.6%
1960	792		0.1%
1970	899		13.5%
1980	772		−14.1%
1990	688		−10.9%
2000	1,389		101.9%
2010	1,309		−5.8%
2020	1,118		−14.6%
U.S. Decennial Census

As of the census of 2000, there were 1,389 people, 523 households, and 348 families residing in the town. The population density was 365.2 people per square mile (141.1/km^{2}). There were 583 housing units at an average density of 153.3 per square mile (59.2/km^{2}). The racial makeup of the town was 62.71% White, 36.14% African American, 0.07% Native American, 0.14% Asian, 0.29% from other races, and 0.65% from two or more races. Hispanic or Latino of any race were 0.94% of the population.

There were 523 households, out of which 24.1% had children under the age of 18 living with them, 51.1% were married couples living together, 14.0% had a female householder with no husband present, and 33.3% were non-families. 31.2% of all households were made up of individuals, and 13.0% had someone living alone who was 65 years of age or older. The average household size was 2.29 and the average family size was 2.83.

In the town, the population was spread out, with 18.9% under the age of 18, 8.2% from 18 to 24, 28.2% from 25 to 44, 25.6% from 45 to 64, and 19.1% who were 65 years of age or older. The median age was 42 years. For every 100 females there were 99.3 males. For every 100 females aged 18 and over, there were 99.6 males.

The median income for a household in the town was $34,871, and the median income for a family was $46,250. Males had a median income of $26,538 versus $21,167 for females. The per capita income for the town was $18,571. About 10.4% of families and 8.4% of the population were below the poverty line, including 4.2% of those under age 18 and 9.8% of those age 65 or over.

== Climate ==
The climate in this area is characterized by hot, humid summers and generally mild to cool winters. According to the Köppen Climate Classification system, Halifax has a humid subtropical climate, abbreviated "Cfa" on climate maps.

== Notable people ==
- Frances Webb Bumpass, newspaper publisher
- Jeb Burton, NASCAR driver
- Earl Ferrell, National Football League player
- Adam Page, former AEW World Champion
- Vivian Pinn, physician and scientist
- Shelby Shackelford, artist

== See also ==
- Carlbrook School
