= Brooklyn Tobacco Factory =

Historic tobacco factory in Virginia, US

- U.S. National Register of Historic Places
- Virginia Landmarks Register
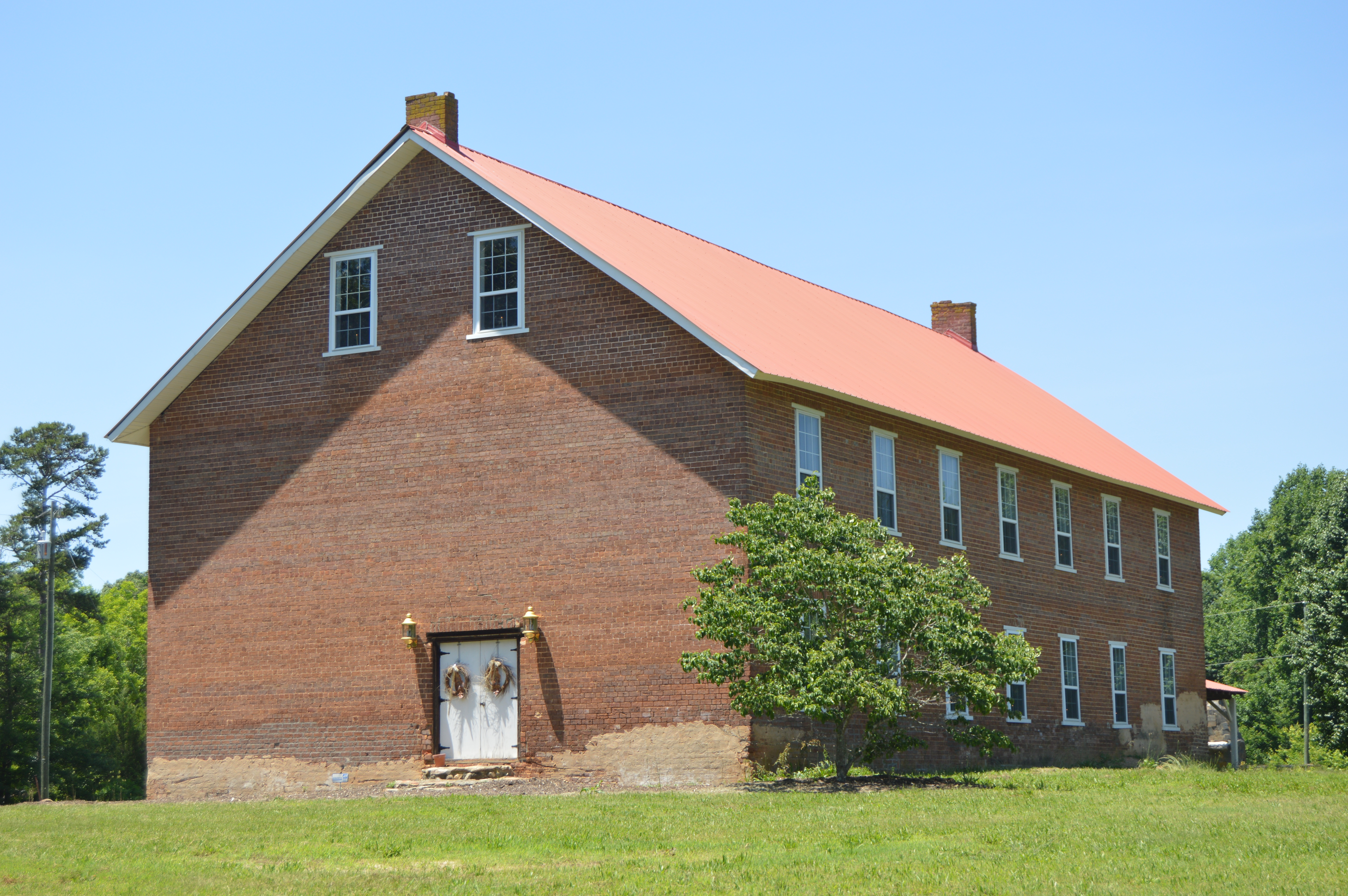
- Front and eastern side

- Location within Virginia Location within the United States
- Location: Northern side of River Road, 0.25 mile east of the Jeremy Creek Road junction, at Brooklyn, Virginia
- Coordinates: 36°40′46″N 79°8′43″W
- Area: 3.9 acres (1.6 ha)
- Built: c. 1855
- Architect: Dabney M. Crosby, Jr.
- NRHP reference No.: 95001559
- VLR No.: 041-0259

Significant dates
- Added to NRHP: January 22, 1996
- Designated VLR: October 18, 1995

Brooklyn Tobacco Factory, also known as the Hightower & Barksdale Tobacco Factory, is a historic tobacco factory located at Brooklyn, Halifax County, Virginia. It was built about 1855, and is a two-story, brick building with a gable roof. It features brick chimney flues projecting above the metal sheathed roof. Also on the property are two contributing pack houses (c. 1880) and the ruins of a log house (c. 1855). The factory was designed and built by Dabney Cosby, Jr., son of the Jeffersonian workman, Dabney Cosby, Sr. The factory remained in operation until 1881.

It was listed on the National Register of Historic Places in 1996.

== History ==
The firm of Hightower & Barksdale began manufacturing plug chewing tobacco in 1855. The workforce was originally composed of slaves either belonging to the factory owners or hired from local planters. Hightower & Barksdale closed its operations in 1860, later to be briefly reopened in the early 1880s by Beverly Barksdale III and William Haymes.

In 1994 Virginia "Ginger" Gentry acquired the long-abandoned factory and with her husband Mack set about saving the factory from further deterioration. They have since preserved the graffiti and stenciling as a record of the factory's history.

The factory is listed in the Virginia Landmarks Register and in the National Register of Historic Places.
