= Tarover =

Historic house in Virginia, United States

- U.S. National Register of Historic Places
- Virginia Landmarks Register
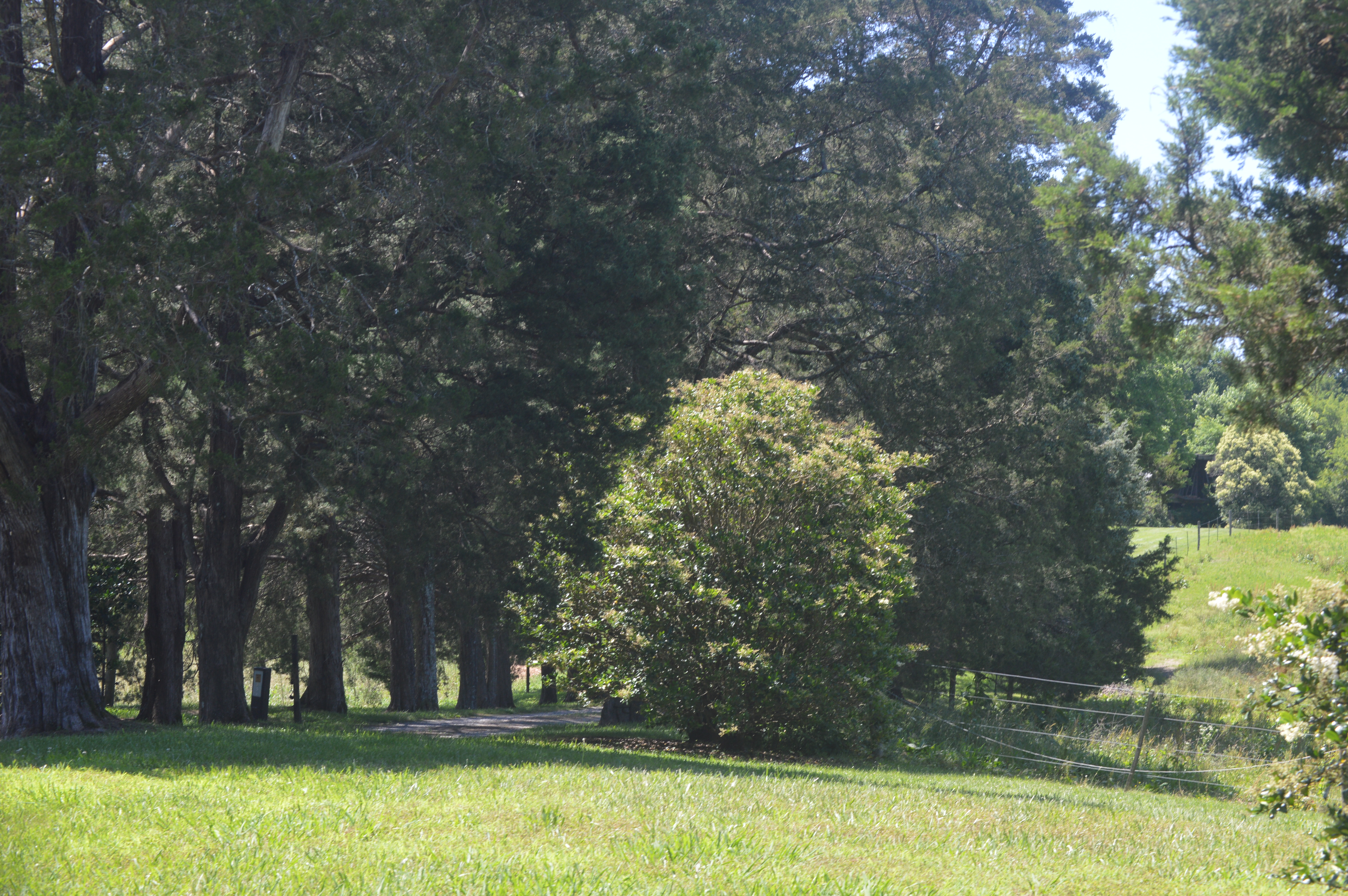
- Entrance to the property

- Location within Virginia Location within the United States
- Location: West of South Boston, Virginia, on River Road
- Coordinates: 36°42′02″N 78°57′53″W
- Area: 25 acres (10 ha)
- Built: 1856
- Architect: John E. Johnson
- Architectural style: Gothic Revival
- NRHP reference No.: 78003021
- VLR No.: 041-0053

Significant dates
- Added to NRHP: September 20, 1978
- Designated VLR: July 18, 1978

Tarover is a historic home located near South Boston, Halifax County, Virginia. It was built in 1856, and is a two-story, gable roofed stone dwelling set on a low stone foundation in the Gothic Revival style. It is three bays wide and features a two-story projecting porch tower with a gable roof.

It was listed on the National Register of Historic Places in 1978.
