= 1992 United States presidential election in Virginia =

- November 3, 1992
- Turnout: 83.7% ▲
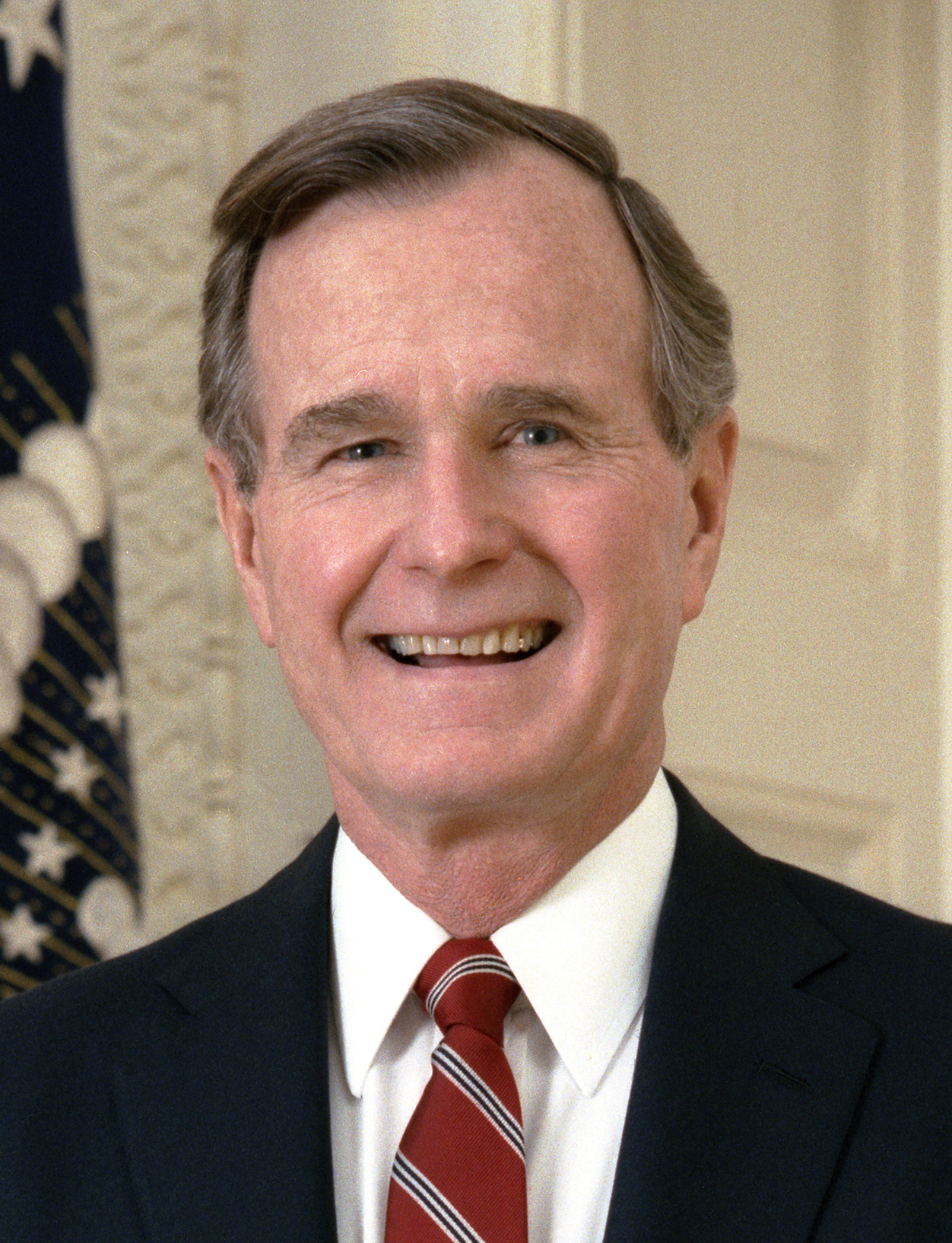

Nominee	George H. W. Bush	Bill Clinton	Ross Perot
Party	Republican	Democratic	Independent
Home state	Texas	Arkansas	Texas
Running mate	Dan Quayle	Al Gore	James Stockdale
Electoral vote	13	0	0
Popular vote	1,150,517	1,038,650	348,639
Percentage	44.97%	40.59%	13.63%

Bush
40–50%
50–60%
60–70%
Clinton
40–50%
50–60%
60–70%
President before election
George H. W. Bush
Republican
Elected President
Bill Clinton
Democratic

The 1992 United States presidential election in Virginia took place on November 3, 1992, as part of the 1992 United States presidential election. Voters chose 13 representatives, or electors, to the Electoral College, who voted for president and vice president.

Virginia was won by incumbent President George H. W. Bush (R-Texas) with 44.97 percent of the popular vote over Governor Bill Clinton (D-Arkansas) with 40.59 percent. Businessman Ross Perot (I-Texas) finished third, with 13.63 percent of the popular vote. Clinton ultimately won the national vote, defeating both incumbent President Bush and Perot.

== Background ==
Every Republican presidential nominee following World War II had won Virginia, except for the victories of Harry S. Truman and Lyndon B. Johnson in the 1948 and 1964 elections. Virginia was the only southern state that Democratic nominee Jimmy Carter failed to win in the 1976 election.

Virginia replaced its primary system and allowed the parties to select either a caucus or convention.

== Primary ==
Governor Douglas Wilder ran for the Democratic nomination, but dropped out before any of the contests were held. Bob Kerrey, Tom Harkin, and Paul Tsongas also withdrew by the time that Virginia held its caucus. Bill Clinton and Jerry Brown were the only remaining major candidates.

== General ==
Wilder was considered as a possible vice-presidential choice for Ross Perot. Perot withdrew before he was certified to appear on the Virginia ballot, but his supporters were still able to submit enough signatures for him to be placed onto it.

With 44.97 percent of the popular vote, Virginia would prove to be Bush's sixth strongest state in the 1992 election after Mississippi, Utah (as a margin of victory), South Carolina, Alabama and Nebraska. In this election, Virginia voted 9.94 percentage points to the right of the nation at large. This would also be the last election in which Virginia would vote to the right of Montana, North Carolina, South Dakota or Texas.

Clinton's result was the closest a Democrat had come to winning Virginia since Carter in 1976. Bush had the lowest percentage for a Republican since Richard Nixon in 1968.

== Results ==
1992 United States presidential election in Virginia
Party	Candidate	Votes	Percentage	Electoral votes
Republican	George H. W. Bush (inc.)	1,150,517	44.97%	13
Democratic	Bill Clinton	1,038,650	40.59%	0
Independent	Ross Perot	348,639	13.63%	0
Independent	Lyndon LaRouche	11,937	0.47%	0
Libertarian	Andre Marrou	5,730	0.22%	0
Independent	Lenora Fulani	3,192	0.12%	0
Totals		2,558,665	100.0%	13

=== By county/city ===
County or city	George H. W. Bush Republican		Bill Clinton Democratic		Ross Perot Independent		Other candidates Various parties		Margin		Total votes cast
County or city	#	%	#	%	#	%	#	%	#	%	Total votes cast
Accomack	5,666	43.17%	4,950	37.71%	2,304	17.55%	205	1.56%	716	5.46%	13,125
Albemarle	13,894	43.69%	13,886	43.66%	3,855	12.12%	169	0.53%	8	0.03%	31,804
Alexandria	16,700	31.70%	30,784	58.44%	4,934	9.37%	257	0.49%	-14,084	-26.74%	52,675
Alleghany	2,294	40.55%	2,396	42.35%	926	16.37%	41	0.72%	-102	-1.80%	5,657
Amelia	2,062	48.82%	1,534	36.32%	574	13.59%	54	1.28%	528	12.50%	4,224
Amherst	5,482	50.26%	4,101	37.60%	1,268	11.62%	57	0.52%	1,381	12.66%	10,908
Appomattox	2,830	50.36%	1,919	34.15%	801	14.25%	70	1.25%	911	16.21%	5,620
Arlington	26,376	31.94%	47,756	57.83%	7,992	9.68%	460	0.56%	-21,380	-25.89%	82,584
Augusta	12,896	58.98%	5,190	23.74%	3,397	15.54%	383	1.75%	7,706	35.24%	21,866
Bath	1,075	46.14%	855	36.70%	354	15.19%	46	1.97%	220	9.44%	2,330
Bedford	10,496	50.57%	6,792	32.72%	3,251	15.66%	217	1.05%	3,704	17.85%	20,756
Bedford City	1,091	45.29%	963	39.98%	313	12.99%	42	1.74%	128	5.31%	2,409
Bland	1,368	48.31%	1,001	35.35%	408	14.41%	55	1.94%	367	12.96%	2,832
Botetourt	5,904	48.36%	4,349	35.62%	1,819	14.90%	137	1.12%	1,555	12.74%	12,209
Bristol	3,616	48.46%	2,948	39.51%	851	11.40%	47	0.63%	668	8.95%	7,462
Brunswick	2,480	36.92%	3,687	54.88%	479	7.13%	72	1.07%	-1,207	-17.96%	6,718
Buchanan	3,297	28.17%	7,405	63.27%	815	6.96%	187	1.60%	-4,108	-35.10%	11,704
Buckingham	2,368	46.40%	2,193	42.97%	459	8.99%	83	1.63%	175	3.43%	5,103
Buena Vista	849	38.59%	1,023	46.50%	291	13.23%	37	1.68%	-174	-7.91%	2,200
Campbell	10,931	55.33%	5,999	30.36%	2,553	12.92%	274	1.39%	4,932	24.97%	19,757
Caroline	2,947	38.01%	3,770	48.63%	965	12.45%	71	0.92%	-823	-10.62%	7,753
Carroll	5,664	51.89%	3,790	34.72%	1,388	12.72%	73	0.67%	1,874	17.17%	10,915
Charles City	729	24.19%	2,010	66.69%	251	8.33%	24	0.80%	-1,281	-42.50%	3,014
Charlotte	2,293	44.86%	2,098	41.05%	640	12.52%	80	1.57%	195	3.81%	5,111
Charlottesville	4,705	31.58%	8,685	58.29%	1,397	9.38%	112	0.75%	-3,980	-26.71%	14,899
Chesapeake	28,909	46.73%	23,495	37.98%	9,237	14.93%	227	0.37%	5,414	8.75%	61,868
Chesterfield	56,626	55.55%	28,028	27.50%	16,898	16.58%	381	0.37%	28,598	28.05%	101,933
Clarke	1,994	42.90%	1,811	38.96%	802	17.25%	41	0.88%	183	3.94%	4,648
Clifton Forge	632	33.74%	958	51.15%	251	13.40%	32	1.71%	-326	-17.41%	1,873
Colonial Heights	5,298	63.07%	1,721	20.49%	1,312	15.62%	69	0.82%	3,577	42.58%	8,400
Covington	995	34.68%	1,442	50.26%	402	14.01%	30	1.05%	-447	-15.58%	2,869
Craig	1,008	43.88%	965	42.01%	304	13.23%	20	0.87%	43	1.87%	2,297
Culpeper	5,226	49.93%	3,444	32.91%	1,640	15.67%	156	1.49%	1,782	17.02%	10,466
Cumberland	1,643	48.55%	1,284	37.94%	372	10.99%	85	2.51%	359	10.61%	3,384
Danville	9,584	48.75%	8,134	41.37%	1,679	8.54%	264	1.34%	1,450	7.38%	19,661
Dickenson	2,574	31.61%	4,839	59.43%	660	8.11%	70	0.86%	-2,265	-27.82%	8,143
Dinwiddie	3,648	42.43%	3,624	42.15%	1,198	13.94%	127	1.48%	24	0.28%	8,597
Emporia	1,094	47.18%	1,048	45.19%	157	6.77%	20	0.86%	46	1.99%	2,319
Essex	1,897	48.59%	1,583	40.55%	382	9.78%	42	1.08%	314	8.04%	3,904
Fairfax	170,488	44.26%	160,186	41.58%	53,012	13.76%	1,532	0.40%	10,302	2.68%	385,218
Fairfax City	4,333	44.70%	3,884	40.07%	1,439	14.85%	37	0.38%	449	4.63%	9,693
Falls Church	1,912	35.38%	2,864	53.00%	599	11.08%	29	0.54%	-952	-17.62%	5,404
Fauquier	10,497	50.57%	6,600	31.79%	3,464	16.69%	198	0.95%	3,897	18.78%	20,759
Floyd	2,575	48.44%	2,026	38.11%	672	12.64%	43	0.81%	549	10.33%	5,316
Fluvanna	2,811	48.03%	2,134	36.47%	871	14.88%	36	0.62%	677	11.56%	5,852
Franklin	6,724	42.83%	6,590	41.97%	2,232	14.22%	155	0.99%	134	0.86%	15,701
Franklin City	1,347	40.34%	1,696	50.79%	272	8.15%	24	0.72%	-349	-10.45%	3,339
Frederick	9,425	53.96%	4,942	28.29%	2,981	17.07%	120	0.69%	4,483	25.67%	17,468
Fredericksburg	2,819	40.98%	3,266	47.48%	738	10.73%	56	0.81%	-447	-6.50%	6,879
Galax	1,087	46.37%	957	40.83%	276	11.77%	24	1.02%	130	5.54%	2,344
Giles	3,023	39.61%	3,346	43.84%	1,142	14.96%	121	1.59%	-323	-4.23%	7,632
Gloucester	6,461	48.42%	4,058	30.41%	2,640	19.78%	186	1.39%	2,403	18.01%	13,345
Goochland	3,834	51.26%	2,589	34.62%	994	13.29%	62	0.83%	1,245	16.64%	7,479
Grayson	3,378	48.68%	2,615	37.69%	860	12.39%	86	1.24%	763	10.99%	6,939
Greene	2,265	52.30%	1,353	31.24%	627	14.48%	86	1.99%	912	21.06%	4,331
Greensville	1,335	33.49%	2,237	56.12%	360	9.03%	54	1.35%	-902	-22.63%	3,986
Halifax	5,199	46.16%	4,752	42.19%	1,140	10.12%	171	1.52%	447	3.97%	11,262
Hampton	19,219	38.53%	23,395	46.90%	6,581	13.19%	683	1.37%	-4,176	-8.37%	49,878
Hanover	20,336	59.36%	8,021	23.41%	5,674	16.56%	230	0.67%	12,315	35.95%	34,261
Harrisonburg	4,935	51.24%	3,414	35.44%	1,162	12.06%	121	1.26%	1,521	15.80%	9,632
Henrico	56,910	52.27%	36,807	33.81%	14,720	13.52%	431	0.40%	20,103	18.46%	108,868
Henry	9,005	41.26%	9,296	42.59%	3,212	14.72%	312	1.43%	-291	-1.33%	21,825
Highland	686	49.00%	494	35.29%	212	15.14%	8	0.57%	192	13.71%	1,400
Hopewell	3,818	47.48%	2,863	35.60%	1,227	15.26%	134	1.67%	955	11.88%	8,042
Isle of Wight	5,370	47.16%	4,380	38.46%	1,536	13.49%	101	0.89%	990	8.70%	11,387
James City	8,781	48.19%	6,536	35.87%	2,675	14.68%	229	1.26%	2,245	12.32%	18,221
King and Queen	1,206	41.34%	1,363	46.73%	323	11.07%	25	0.86%	-157	-5.39%	2,917
King George	2,570	48.27%	1,811	34.02%	918	17.24%	25	0.47%	759	14.25%	5,324
King William	2,591	49.54%	1,822	34.84%	758	14.49%	59	1.13%	769	14.70%	5,230
Lancaster	2,841	51.39%	1,812	32.78%	739	13.37%	136	2.46%	1,029	18.61%	5,528
Lee	3,504	35.77%	5,215	53.24%	1,002	10.23%	75	0.77%	-1,711	-17.47%	9,796
Lexington	894	39.26%	1,128	49.54%	228	10.01%	27	1.19%	-234	-10.28%	2,277
Loudoun	19,290	46.40%	14,462	34.79%	7,391	17.78%	431	1.04%	4,828	11.61%	41,574
Louisa	3,461	41.66%	3,399	40.92%	1,381	16.62%	66	0.79%	62	0.74%	8,307
Lunenburg	2,227	45.34%	2,082	42.39%	505	10.28%	98	2.00%	145	2.95%	4,912
Lynchburg	12,518	50.13%	9,587	38.40%	2,545	10.19%	319	1.28%	2,931	11.73%	24,969
Madison	2,341	48.99%	1,700	35.57%	653	13.66%	85	1.78%	641	13.42%	4,779
Manassas	5,453	48.89%	3,647	32.70%	1,971	17.67%	83	0.74%	1,806	16.19%	11,154
Manassas Park	792	46.05%	567	32.97%	356	20.70%	5	0.29%	225	13.08%	1,720
Martinsville	2,690	40.65%	3,073	46.44%	748	11.30%	106	1.60%	-383	-5.79%	6,617
Mathews	2,179	48.15%	1,402	30.98%	884	19.54%	60	1.33%	777	17.17%	4,525
Mecklenburg	5,401	49.23%	4,273	38.95%	1,128	10.28%	168	1.53%	1,128	10.28%	10,970
Middlesex	2,224	47.47%	1,597	34.09%	768	16.39%	96	2.05%	627	13.38%	4,685
Montgomery	10,606	42.53%	10,658	42.74%	3,449	13.83%	222	0.89%	-52	-0.21%	24,935
Nelson	2,159	38.99%	2,586	46.70%	748	13.51%	45	0.81%	-427	-7.71%	5,538
New Kent	2,708	49.39%	1,738	31.70%	1,017	18.55%	20	0.36%	970	17.69%	5,483
Newport News	26,779	43.83%	25,743	42.14%	8,217	13.45%	352	0.58%	1,036	1.69%	61,091
Norfolk	22,362	32.40%	37,602	54.47%	8,732	12.65%	331	0.48%	-15,240	-22.07%	69,027
Northampton	2,088	37.17%	2,568	45.71%	844	15.02%	118	2.10%	-480	-8.54%	5,618
Northumberland	2,667	50.00%	1,862	34.91%	729	13.67%	76	1.42%	805	15.09%	5,334
Norton	472	30.49%	871	56.27%	182	11.76%	23	1.49%	-399	-25.78%	1,548
Nottoway	2,610	45.45%	2,411	41.98%	606	10.55%	116	2.02%	199	3.47%	5,743
Orange	4,092	45.64%	3,348	37.34%	1,425	15.89%	101	1.13%	744	8.30%	8,966
Page	4,203	49.68%	3,010	35.58%	1,163	13.75%	84	0.99%	1,193	14.10%	8,460
Patrick	3,521	48.98%	2,465	34.29%	1,026	14.27%	177	2.46%	1,056	14.69%	7,189
Petersburg	3,125	24.57%	8,671	68.18%	834	6.56%	87	0.68%	-5,546	-43.61%	12,717
Pittsylvania	11,467	52.38%	7,675	35.06%	2,296	10.49%	456	2.08%	3,792	17.32%	21,894
Poquoson	3,354	61.69%	1,086	19.97%	960	17.66%	37	0.68%	2,268	41.72%	5,437
Portsmouth	12,575	33.45%	20,416	54.30%	4,360	11.60%	248	0.66%	-7,841	-20.85%	37,599
Powhatan	3,832	54.08%	1,950	27.52%	1,232	17.39%	72	1.02%	1,882	26.56%	7,086
Prince Edward	2,858	44.78%	2,775	43.47%	635	9.95%	115	1.80%	83	1.31%	6,383
Prince George	4,799	50.99%	3,087	32.80%	1,459	15.50%	67	0.71%	1,712	18.19%	9,412
Prince William	35,432	46.82%	26,486	35.00%	13,190	17.43%	572	0.76%	8,946	11.82%	75,680
Pulaski	6,148	43.96%	5,633	40.27%	2,066	14.77%	140	1.00%	515	3.69%	13,987
Radford	1,996	41.71%	2,183	45.62%	582	12.16%	24	0.50%	-187	-3.91%	4,785
Rappahannock	1,410	44.33%	1,273	40.02%	487	15.31%	11	0.35%	137	4.31%	3,181
Richmond	1,609	52.75%	1,034	33.90%	366	12.00%	41	1.34%	575	18.85%	3,050
Richmond City	24,341	30.53%	47,642	59.75%	6,992	8.77%	760	0.95%	-23,301	-29.22%	79,735
Roanoke	20,667	50.31%	14,704	35.79%	5,477	13.33%	232	0.56%	5,963	14.52%	41,080
Roanoke City	13,443	38.21%	17,724	50.38%	3,753	10.67%	261	0.74%	-4,281	-12.17%	35,181
Rockbridge	3,228	43.02%	2,908	38.76%	1,254	16.71%	113	1.51%	320	4.26%	7,503
Rockingham	13,016	60.56%	5,407	25.16%	2,839	13.21%	231	1.07%	7,609	35.40%	21,493
Russell	3,891	33.88%	6,480	56.43%	958	8.34%	155	1.35%	-2,589	-22.55%	11,484
Salem	5,143	48.21%	4,028	37.75%	1,430	13.40%	68	0.64%	1,115	10.46%	10,669
Scott	4,515	46.59%	3,979	41.06%	957	9.88%	239	2.47%	536	5.53%	9,690
Shenandoah	7,746	55.74%	3,956	28.47%	2,063	14.85%	131	0.94%	3,790	27.27%	13,896
Smyth	6,128	47.39%	4,924	38.08%	1,618	12.51%	261	2.02%	1,204	9.31%	12,931
South Boston	1,435	52.05%	1,051	38.12%	252	9.14%	19	0.69%	384	13.93%	2,757
Southampton	2,844	41.37%	3,199	46.54%	754	10.97%	77	1.12%	-355	-5.17%	6,874
Spotsylvania	11,829	49.26%	8,133	33.87%	3,918	16.32%	134	0.56%	3,696	15.39%	24,014
Stafford	12,528	50.37%	7,718	31.03%	4,481	18.02%	144	0.58%	4,810	19.34%	24,871
Staunton	4,989	54.04%	2,851	30.88%	1,146	12.41%	246	2.66%	2,138	23.16%	9,232
Suffolk	8,697	43.01%	9,196	45.47%	2,150	10.63%	180	0.89%	-499	-2.46%	20,223
Surry	1,046	31.94%	1,823	55.66%	364	11.11%	42	1.28%	-777	-23.72%	3,275
Sussex	1,527	35.90%	2,193	51.56%	446	10.49%	87	2.05%	-666	-15.66%	4,253
Tazewell	6,375	37.38%	8,586	50.34%	1,872	10.98%	223	1.31%	-2,211	-12.96%	17,056
Virginia Beach	68,936	50.03%	44,294	32.15%	24,087	17.48%	468	0.34%	24,642	17.88%	137,785
Warren	4,319	44.64%	3,554	36.73%	1,650	17.05%	153	1.58%	765	7.91%	9,676
Washington	9,150	48.17%	7,269	38.27%	2,288	12.05%	288	1.52%	1,881	9.90%	18,995
Waynesboro	3,758	52.57%	2,302	32.20%	961	13.44%	128	1.79%	1,456	20.37%	7,149
Westmoreland	2,554	41.04%	2,758	44.32%	818	13.14%	93	1.49%	-204	-3.28%	6,223
Williamsburg	1,349	36.27%	1,856	49.91%	445	11.97%	69	1.86%	-507	-13.64%	3,719
Winchester	3,833	49.77%	2,768	35.94%	1,048	13.61%	52	0.68%	1,065	13.83%	7,701
Wise	5,144	34.62%	7,681	51.70%	1,835	12.35%	197	1.33%	-2,537	-17.08%	14,857
Wythe	5,121	48.81%	3,616	34.46%	1,557	14.84%	198	1.89%	1,505	14.35%	10,492
York	10,197	51.07%	6,218	31.14%	3,426	17.16%	125	0.63%	3,979	19.93%	19,966
Totals	1,150,517	44.97%	1,038,650	40.59%	348,639	13.63%	20,859	0.82%	111,867	4.38%	2,558,665

==== Counties and independent cities that flipped from Republican to Democratic ====
- Alleghany
- Buena Vista
- Fredericksburg
- Giles
- Hampton
- Henry
- King and Queen
- Martinsville
- Nelson
- Northampton
- Pulaski
- Radford
- Southampton
- Suffolk
- Westmoreland
- Williamsburg

== Works cited ==
- Moreland, Laurence; Steed, Robert; Baker, Tod, eds. (1991). The 1988 Presidential Election in the South: Continuity Amidst Change in Southern Party Politics. Praeger Publishers. ISBN 0275931455.
- Steed, Robert; Moreland, Laurence; Baker, Tod, eds. (1994). The 1992 Presidential Election in the South: Current Patterns of Southern Party and Electoral Politics. Praeger Publishers. ISBN 0275945340.
