= Halifax County High School =

Coordinates: 36.731°N 78.9088°W

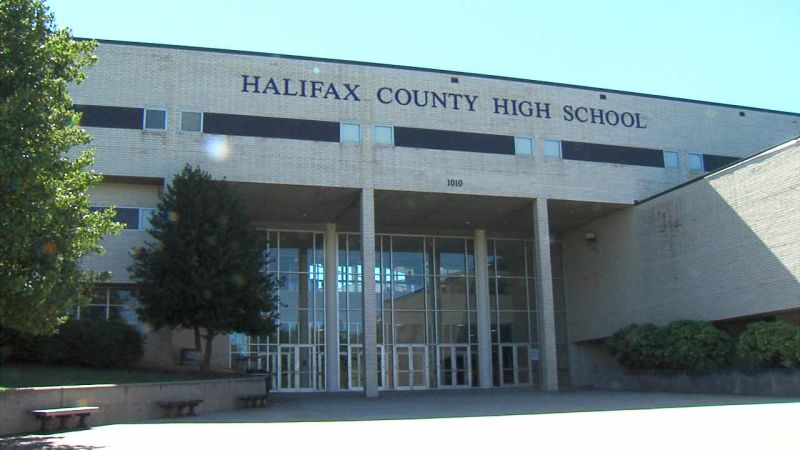
- 1010 High School Circle; South Boston, VA 24592; United States

Information
- Type: Public high school
- Motto: "Where Comets Take Flight"
- Established: 1979
- Locale: Town, Remote
- School district: Halifax County Public Schools
- NCES District ID: 5101770
- Superintendent: Amy Huskin
- NCES School ID: 510177001848
- Principal: Kelvin Davis
- Teaching staff: 116.10 (on an FTE basis)
- Grades: 9–12
- Enrollment: 1,282 (2024–25)
- Student to teacher ratio: 11.04
- Colors: Light Blue and White
- Athletics conference: VSHL; AAA Northwest Region; Piedmont District
- Team name: Comets
- Rival: Person County High School George Washington High School
- Website: www.halifax.k12.va.us/o/highschool

Halifax County High School is a public high school located in South Boston, Virginia, United States. It is located less than 2 mi (3.2 km) from Halifax County Middle School. 1,282 students were enrolled in the 2024–25 school year.

== Demographics ==
The student body makeup is 49 percent male and 51 percent female, and the total minority enrollment is 51 percent. Halifax County High is the only high school in Halifax County Public Schools. Halifax County High School has an 82.2 percent on-time graduation rate and a 2.1 percent drop out rate.

== Academics ==
Halifax County High School is a comprehensive high school for grades 9–12, and the only high school in Halifax County Public Schools. Of the 1,827 students in the school, 51% are African American (937), 47% are White (861), and 1% are Hispanic (25).

== Athletics ==
Halifax High competes in the Virginia High School League's 4a Region, and are in the Piedmont District. The school fields 16 different sports in baseball, boys' and girls' basketball, cross country, football, boys' and girls' golf, boys' and girls' soccer, softball, boys' and girls' tennis, track and field, girls' volleyball, wrestling, and swimming diving & JV/ Varsity cheerleading

The school is a part of Halifax County Public Schools and, in athletics, the AAA Northwest Region of the Virginia High School League.

Halifax County High School is equipped with two football fields, one soccer field, one field for baseball, and a basketball arena.

== Notable alumni ==
- Robert "Bootie" Barker, NASCAR Cup Series Crew Chief
- Jeb Burton, NASCAR O'Reilly Auto Parts series driver
- Alonzo Coleman, former NFL player
- Terry Davis, Former NBA center
- Tyrone Davis, former NFL player
- Earl Ferrell, former NFL player
- Adam Page, current professional wrestler signed to All Elite Wrestling
- Jeremy Jeffress, Former MLB player (Milwaukee Brewers, Kansas City Royals)
- Don Testerman, former NFL player
- Tisha Waller is an American athlete who participated in the 1996 Summer Olympics and 2004 Summer Olympics
- Barry Word, former NFL player
- Andrew Abbott, current MLB pitcher for the Cincinnati Reds

== See also ==
- List of school divisions in Virginia
