= South Boston Historic District =

Historic district in Virginia, United States

- U.S. National Register of Historic Places
- U.S. Historic district
- Virginia Landmarks Register
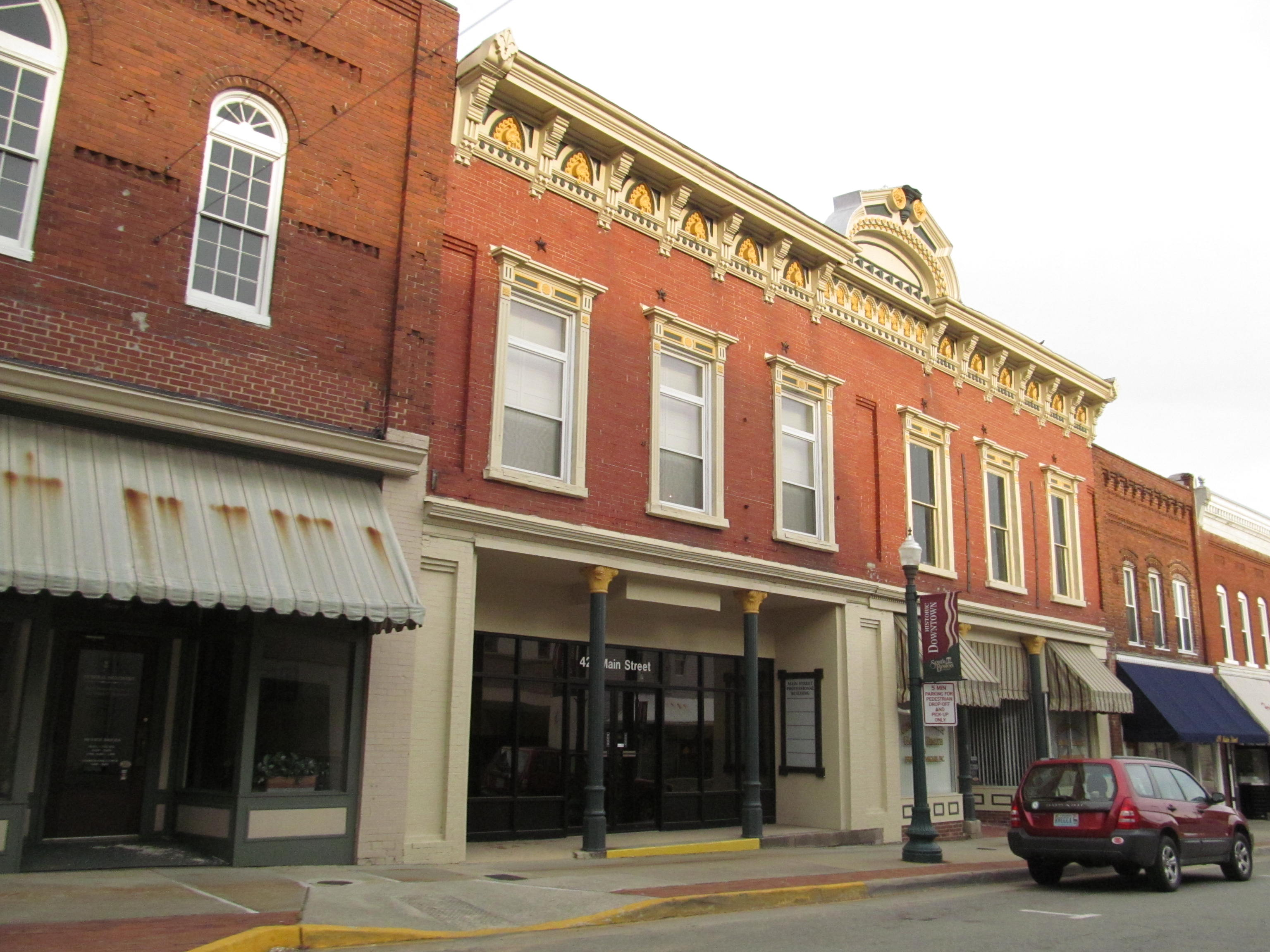

- Location within Virginia Location within the United States
- Location: Along Railroad Ave., Ferry, Factory, and Main Sts., Wilborn Ave., N. Main St., Washington and Peach Aves., and Jeffress; Neighborhoods of Marshall Ave., New Brick Warehouse, Mizpah Church, N. Main St. South Boston, Virginia
- Coordinates: 36°41′57″N 78°54′10″W
- Area: 301.5 acres (122.0 ha)
- Built: 1854
- Architectural style: Colonial Revival, Tudor Revival, Italianate
- NRHP reference No.: 86002471, 09000418 (Boundary Increase)
- VLR No.: 130-0006

Significant dates
- Added to NRHP: September 26, 1986, June 11, 2009 (Boundary Increase)
- Designated VLR: August 16, 1983, December 18, 2008

South Boston Historic District is a national historic district located at South Boston, Halifax County, Virginia. The district includes 594 contributing buildings and 7 contributing structures in the Village of South Boston. It consists of industrial, commercial, and residential building types dating from the mid-19th century to the present. Notable buildings include the C.H. Friend School, New Brick Warehouse (c. 1930), Planters and Merchants Bank, Halifax Cotton Mill, R.J. Reynolds Tobacco Company tobacco prizery, former Liggett-Meyer Tobacco Company tobacco prizery, the Parkinson Block (1899), First Presbyterian Church (1887), First Baptist Church (c. 1900), and Mt. Olive Baptist Church (c. 1900).

It was listed on the National Register of Historic Places in 1986, with a boundary increase in 2009.
