= Seaton (South Boston, Virginia) =

Historic house in Virginia, United States

- U.S. National Register of Historic Places
- Virginia Landmarks Register
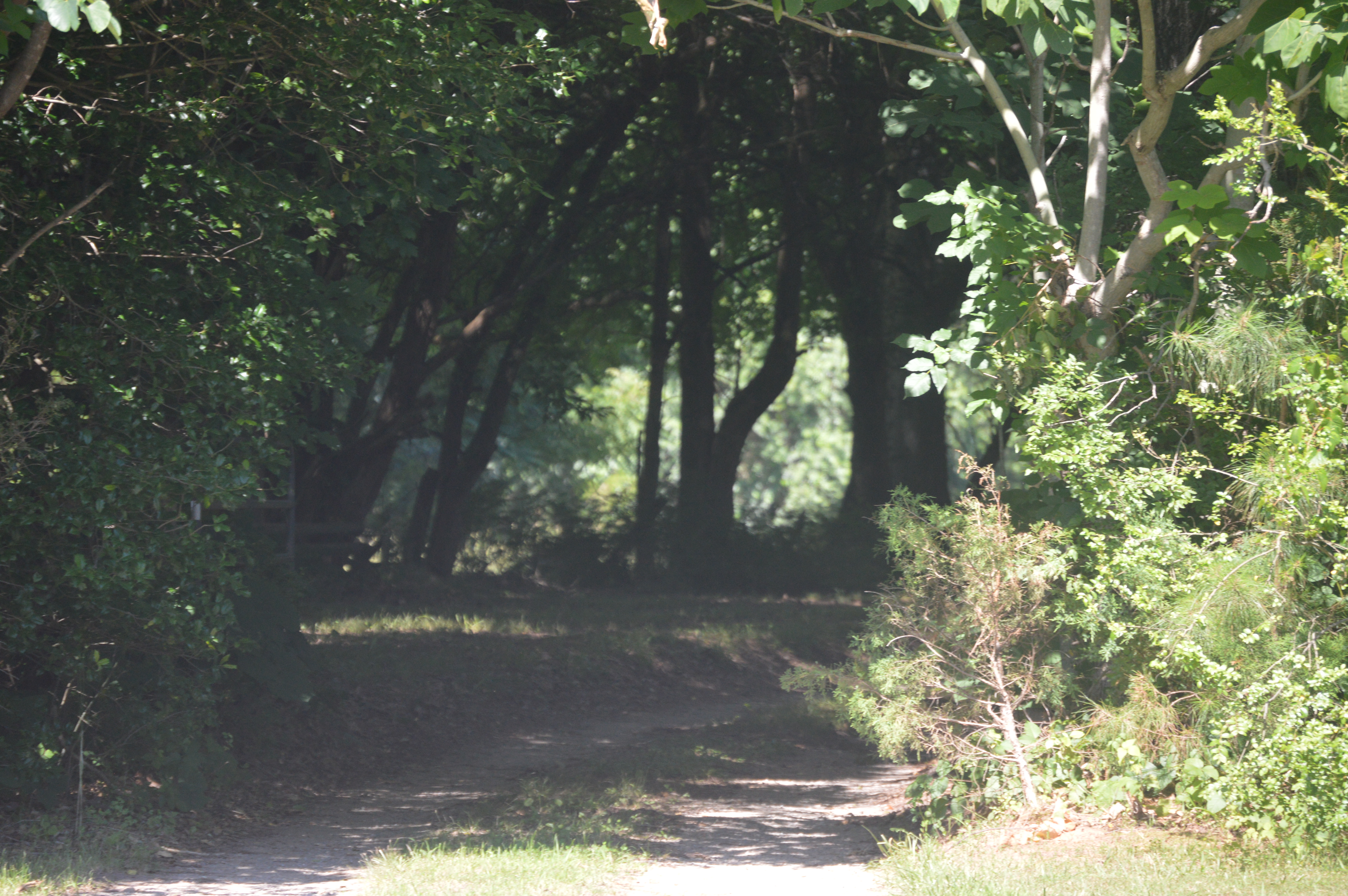
- Entrance to the estate

- Location within Virginia Location within the United States
- Location: U.S. Route 501 north of South Boston, Virginia
- Coordinates: 36°44′41″N 78°55′24″W
- Area: 12 acres (4.9 ha)
- Built: 1856-1857, 1887
- Architect: Josiah Dabbs
- Architectural style: Gothic Revival
- NRHP reference No.: 80004193
- VLR No.: 041-0050

Significant dates
- Added to NRHP: May 19, 1980
- Designated VLR: March 18, 1980

Seaton is a historic house located near South Boston, Halifax County, Virginia. It was built in 1856–57, and is a 1 1/2-story, gable roofed wood frame dwelling set on a stone and brick foundation in the Gothic Revival style. It was enlarged by a 2 1/2-story addition and kitchen wing in 1887. Also on the property is a contributing carriage shed and shed.

It was listed on the National Register of Historic Places in 1980.
