= E. L. Evans House =

Historic house in Virginia, United States

- U.S. National Register of Historic Places
- Virginia Landmarks Register
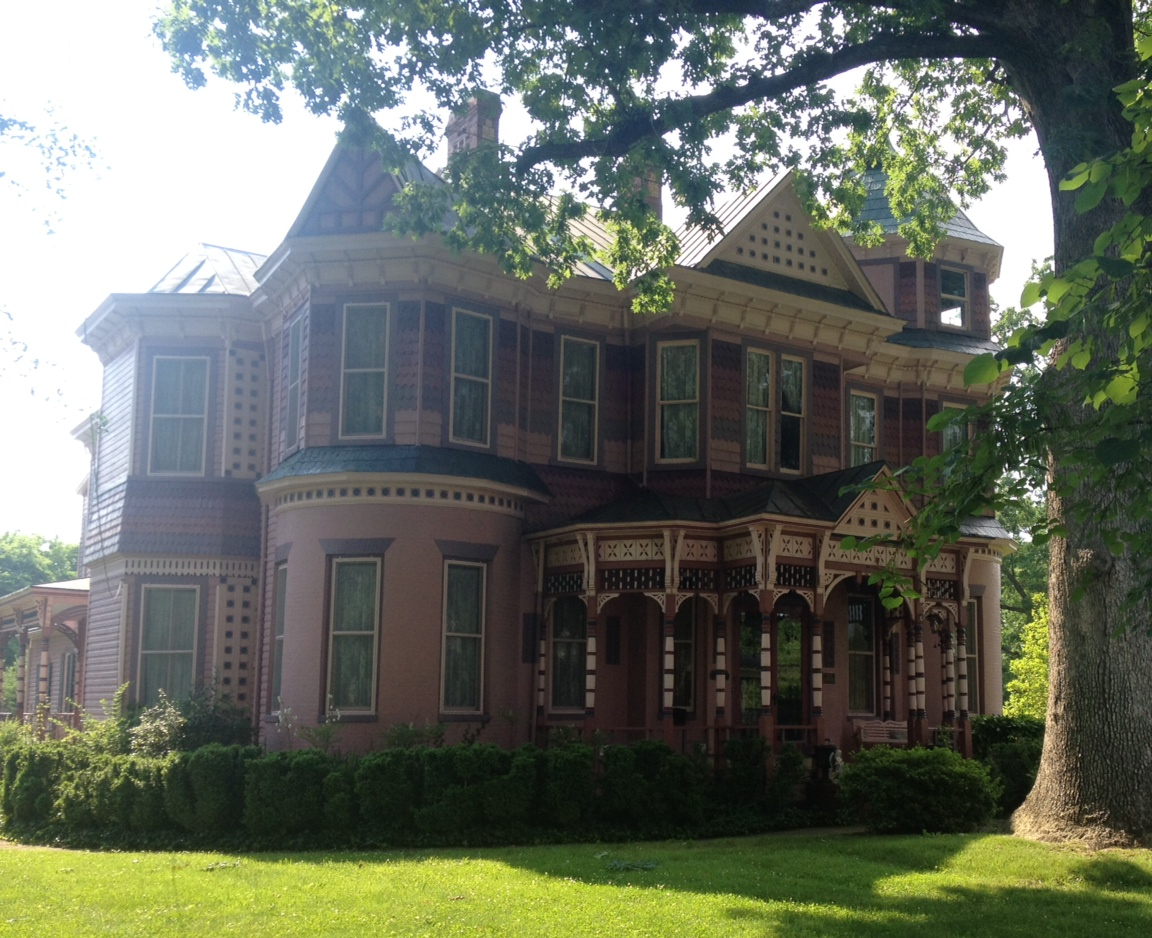
- E. L. Evans House

- Location within Virginia Location within the United States
- Location: 1204 Washington Ave., South Boston, Virginia
- Coordinates: 36°42′16″N 78°54′4″W
- Area: 1.7 acres (0.69 ha)
- Built: 1892
- Architectural style: Late Victorian
- NRHP reference No.: 08000388
- VLR No.: 130-0006-0407

Significant dates
- Added to NRHP: May 8, 2008
- Designated VLR: March 20, 2008

E. L. Evans House is a historic home located at South Boston, Halifax County, Virginia. It was built in 1892, and is a large two-story, five-bay, balloon-frame High Victorian style dwelling. The front facade features a projecting center gable holding cutaway bays on both the first and second stories, a three-story tower on the northeast corner, and a curved, projecting gabled bay. Also on the property is the contributing brick foundation for the former ice house.

It was listed on the National Register of Historic Places in 2008.
