= Halifax County Schools =

Halifax County Schools may refer to:

- Halifax County Public Schools in Virginia
- Halifax County Schools (North Carolina)

== See also ==
- Halifax Regional School Board which covers Halifax County, Nova Scotia
