= Alonzo Coleman =

American football player (born 1984)

No. 30
- Position: Running back

Personal information
- Born: January 27, 1984 (age 42); Halifax, Virginia, U.S.
- Listed height: 5 ft 9 in (1.75 m)
- Listed weight: 210 lb (95 kg)

Career information
- High school: Halifax County (South Boston, Virginia)
- College: Hampton
- NFL draft: 2007: undrafted

Career history
- Dallas Cowboys (2007–2008)

Awards and highlights
- MEAC Rookie of the Year (2003); 4× first-team All-MEAC (2003–2006); MEAC Offensive Player of the Year (2005); Third-team Division I-AA All-American (2005); 2× HBCU All-American (2005, 2006)
- Stats at Pro Football Reference

Alonzo Coleman (born January 27, 1984) is an American former professional football player who was a running back for the Dallas Cowboys of the National Football League (NFL). He was signed by the Dallas Cowboys as an undrafted free agent in 2007. He played college football for the Hampton Pirates.

== Early life ==
Coleman attended Halifax County High School, where he finished as the school's all-time leading rusher with more than 3,500 yards in his high school career. He also recorded over 700 receiving yards and 600 return yards.

As a senior, he set the Halifax County High School single-season rushing record with over 1,500 yards and also set the school's single-game rushing record with 315 yards. He received first-team All-district, All-region and Western Valley District Co-Player of the Year honors. In track, he was a regional qualifier in the 100 metres, 4 × 100 metres relay and 300 metres competitions.

In 2017, he was inducted into the South Boston-Halifax County Sports Hall of Fame.

== College career ==
He accepted a football scholarship from Hampton University. As a true freshman, he was named the starter over senior Rian Thompson. He tallied 239 carries for 1,137, becoming the first freshman in school history to rush for over 1,000 yards in a season. He also had a conference-best 18 touchdowns (third in school history).

As a sophomore, he posted 225 carries for 1,133 yards and 13 touchdowns, becoming the first player in school history to start his career with back-to-back 1,000-plus rushing yard seasons. He had a career-high 209 yards with three touchdowns in the season opener against Jackson State University. He was limited with an ankle injury he suffered against Morgan State University. Along with Ardell Daniels, they were the only teammates in Division I-AA to each rush for more than 1,000 yards.

As a junior, he had 204 carries for 1,326 yards (second in school history) and 19 touchdowns (second in school history). He set a school record five rushing touchdowns (30 points) and a season-high 172 rushing yards against Gardner–Webb University. Coleman (1,326) and Daniels (1,044) also became the third pair of teammates in Division I-AA history, to each rush for more than 1,000 yards in back-to-back seasons.

As a senior, although he was limited with a hip pointer injury, he registered 158 carries for 1,052 yards and 12 touchdowns, becoming the sixth player in Division I-AA history to rush for more than 1000 yards in each of his four seasons. He broke the MEAC career rushing record against Winston-Salem State University. He had 180 rushing yards and 2 touchdowns against Bethune–Cookman University. He tallied 181 rushing yards and 4 touchdowns against Florida A&M University.

Coleman finished his college career with 826 carries (conference and school record) for 4,648 yards (conference and school record), 62 rushing touchdowns (conference and school record), 64 total touchdowns (school record) and 24 100-yard rushing games. He also contributed to three straight MEAC championships (2004, 2005, 2006).

== Professional career ==
Coleman was signed as an undrafted free agent by the Dallas Cowboys after the 2007 NFL draft on April 23. He began training camp on the physically unable to perform list with an ankle injury. The injury limited his playing time and although he was waived on September 1, he was later signed to the practice squad.

He was cut on August 30, 2008, after being passed over on the depth chart by Tashard Choice and was later signed to the practice squad. On December 5, he was promoted to the active roster, because of injuries to both Marion Barber III and Felix Jones. He made his NFL debut playing on special teams against the Pittsburgh Steelers. He was declared inactive in the last 3 games of the season.

In 2009, a knee injury limited his playing time during training camp and he was waived injured on August 17.
