= Glennmary =

Historic house in Virginia, United States

- U.S. National Register of Historic Places
- Virginia Landmarks Register
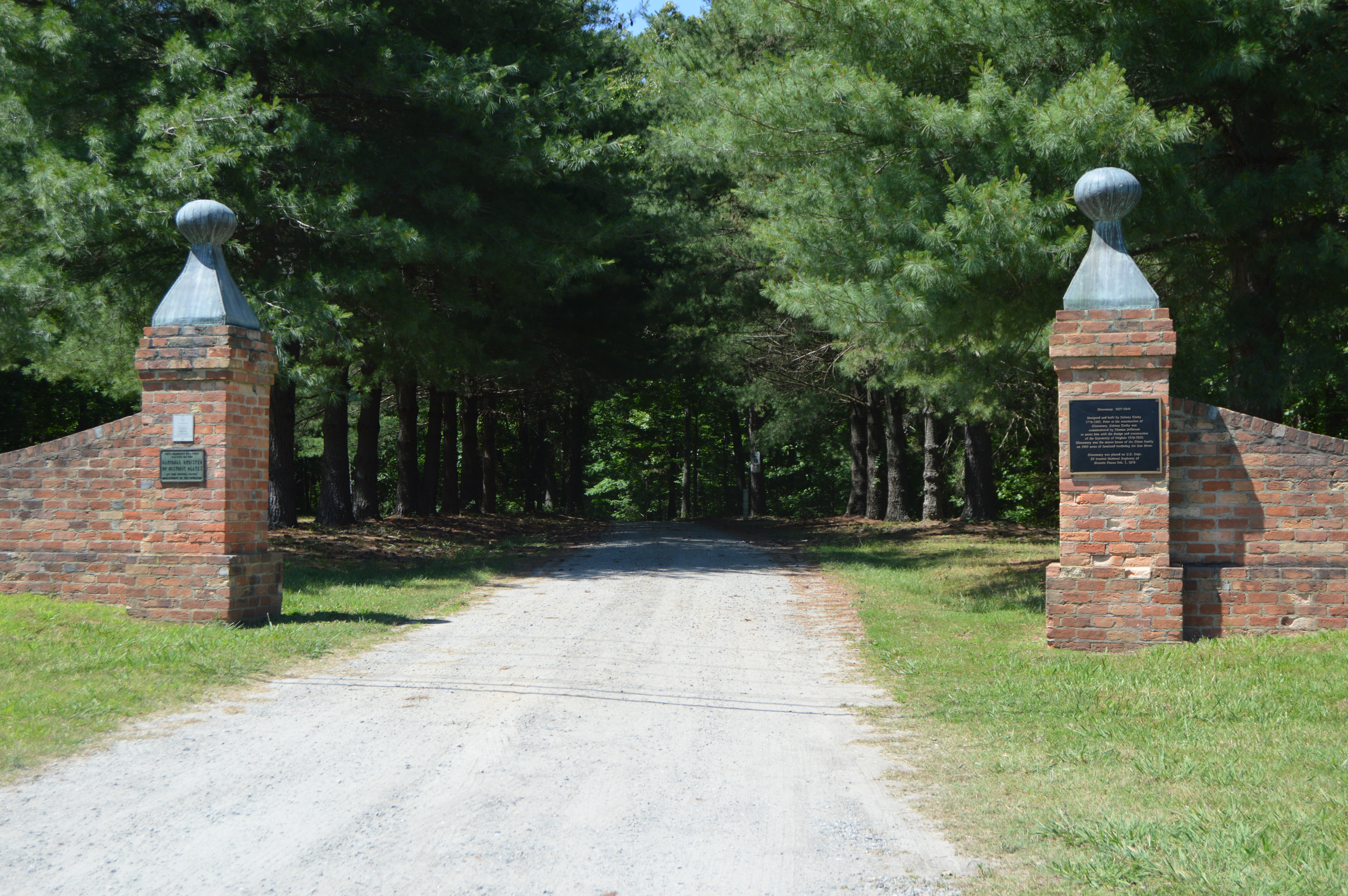
- Entrance to the property

- Location within Virginia Location within the United States
- Location: U.S. Route 58 southwest of South Boston, Virginia
- Coordinates: 36°40′42″N 78°56′00″W
- Area: 52 acres (21 ha)
- Built: 1837–1840
- Architect: Dabney Cosby
- Architectural style: Greek Revival
- NRHP reference No.: 79003043
- VLR No.: 041-0104

Significant dates
- Added to NRHP: February 1, 1979
- Designated VLR: November 21, 1978

Glennmary is a historic home located near South Boston, Halifax County, Virginia. It was built in 1837–1840, and is a 2 1/2-story, three-bay, side hall plan, gable roofed brick dwelling in the Greek Revival style. It has a 1 1/2-story, one-bay, side wing. The front facade features a one-story pedimented Greek Doric order portico. Also on the property are the contributing slave quarters, a log cabin, a smokehouse, and sheds.

It was listed on the National Register of Historic Places in 1979.
