= Usher F. Linder =

American politician (1809–1876

Usher Ferguson Linder (March 20, 1809 – June 5, 1876) served as Illinois Attorney General from 1837 until 1839. He was also a private-sector attorney in practice during the early statehood years of Illinois. In several of his cases, he practiced in affiliation with the Springfield, Illinois firm of Lincoln and Herndon and with its circuit partner, Abraham Lincoln.

== Biography ==
Usher F. Linder was a member of the generation of pioneer Kentuckians who moved to the frontier state of Illinois because of its opportunities in the making of a career. Moving to the new Prairie State in 1835, Linder settled in Coles County and was admitted to the bar.

He became active in politics, being elected to the Illinois House of Representatives in 1836, 1846, and 1850.

He was appointed as state attorney general, serving 1837–1839. He was called to assist the city of Alton attorney, Francis Butter Murdoch, in prosecuting what was known as the "Alton Riot Trial", following the attack on a warehouse and deaths of a man named Bishop and Elijah Parish Lovejoy on November 7, 1837.

He also practiced law in Illinois from 1835 until 1860.

=== Political career ===
As a state representative from southeastern Illinois elected in 1836, Linder met a young lawmaker from Sangamon County in central Illinois, Abraham Lincoln. In defense of his constituents, Linder attempted to oppose Lincoln's successful efforts to move the young state's capital from Vandalia, Illinois to Springfield, Illinois. The pro-slavery Linder opposed many of Lincoln's political views, as he was a member of the Illinois Democratic Party prior to 1839 and again after 1854.

However, Lincoln and Linder also practiced law in affiliation with each other. Lincoln was the circuit partner of a Springfield-based practice that handled a wide variety of cases in the Eighth Circuit, a collection of counties in central and southeastern Illinois that included both Sangamon County and Coles County. As Linder had by this time become a leading lawyer in Coles County, this meant that both lawyers needed to affiliate with a fellow professional in each other's home county.

=== Relationship with Lincoln ===
Although Lincoln and Linder were never legal partners, their practices were affiliated. They handed off cases to each other, especially as Lincoln wound down his active casework and became a U.S. presidential candidate in 1860. As an active Democrat after 1854, Linder was an ally of Lincoln's chief Illinois political rival, U.S. Senator Stephen A. Douglas. Linder helped to organize Coles County for Douglas, which took on significance when the county seat, Charleston, Illinois, became the site of one of the Lincoln-Douglas debates in the senatorial campaign of 1858. Douglas grew to rely upon lawyer Linder as a key political troubleshooter. In one episode, the beset senator sent a frantic telegram to Linder, "For gods sake Linder come and help me fight them." For the rest of his life, the attorney bore the nickname of "For God's Sake" Linder.

After Lincoln's election and the outbreak of the Civil War, Linder's son, Daniel Linder, became a soldier for the Confederate States of America and was captured. After his father pleaded with Lincoln, the commander-in-chief asked that the prisoner of war be sent to see him at the White House. Young Daniel appeared under guard and was granted a note that instructed him to take an oath of allegiance to the United States and released him to the custody of his father. Daniel Linder was freed on December 26, 1863.

According to the "Terre Haute Journal", Linder's teenage son shot a schoolmate, the son of Dr. Ball, on the evening of May 13, 1856, over some difficulties at school. When Lincoln heard of this, he offered to represent him gratis, "an offer that brought tears to the eyes of the distraught father."

Known for his violence, in 1859 while in open court, Linder beat up a fellow attorney. Linder retired from the practice of law in the 1860s. In his later years he wrote a slim volume of memoirs, Reminiscences of the Early Bench and Bar of Illinois. He died in Chicago in 1876.

Legal offices
Preceded by Walter B. Scates	Attorney General of Illinois; 1837 – 1838	Succeeded by George W. Olney
