= Ingram, Virginia =

Unincorporated community in Virginia, United States

- Unincorporated community
- Location within Virginia Location within the United States
- Coordinates: 36°44′39″N 79°09′30″W
- Country: United States
- State: Virginia
- County: Halifax
- Elevation: 705 ft (215 m)
- Time zone: UTC-5 (Eastern (EST))
  - Summer (DST): UTC-4 (EDT)
- ZIP code: 24597
- Area code: 434
- GNIS feature ID: 1477435

Ingram is an unincorporated community in Halifax County, Virginia, United States. Ingram is located on Virginia State Route 360, 12.9 miles (20.8 km) west of Halifax.
