= Riverdale, Halifax County, Virginia =

- Census-designated place
- Location within Virginia Location within the United States
- Coordinates: 36°40′53″N 78°53′54″W
- Country: United States
- State: Virginia
- County: Halifax

Area
  - Total: 8.3 sq mi (21.5 km^{2})
  - Land: 8.1 sq mi (21.1 km^{2})
  - Water: 0.15 sq mi (0.4 km^{2})
- Elevation: 406 ft (124 m)

Population (2010)
  - Total: 956
  - Density: 117/sq mi (45.3/km^{2})
- Time zone: UTC−5 (Eastern (EST))
  - Summer (DST): UTC−4 (EDT)
- ZIP code: 24592
- FIPS code: 51-67352
- GNIS feature ID: 2584910

Riverdale is a census-designated place in Halifax County, Virginia, United States. The population as of the 2010 census was 956.

== Geography ==
Riverdale is located in south-central Halifax County on the south side of the Dan River, an east-flowing tributary of the Roanoke River. The community is bordered to the north by the town of South Boston, the largest town in the county.

Three U.S. highways pass through Riverdale. U.S. Routes 58 and 360 enter Riverdale together from the west, leading 30 miles (48 km) to Danville. The two highways cross U.S. Route 501 at what was formerly the center of Riverdale but has since been annexed by the town of South Boston. US 501 leads north through South Boston towards Lynchburg, 61 miles (98 km) away, while to the south the highway leads 52 miles (84 km) to Durham, North Carolina. US 58 and 360 split in the eastern part of Riverdale, with US 360 leading northeast 38 miles (61 km) to Keysville and US 58 leading east 48 miles (77 km) to South Hill.

According to the U.S. Census Bureau, the Riverdale CDP has a total area of 8.3 square miles (21.5 km^{2}), of which 8.1 square miles (21.1 km^{2}) are land and 0.2 square miles (0.4 km^{2}), or 1.86%, are water.

== Demographics ==
Historical population
Census	Pop.	Note	%±
2010	956		—
U.S. Decennial Census; 2010 2020

Riverdale was first listed as a census designated place in the 2010 U.S. census.
