= Walter B. Scates =

American lawyer and judge (1808–1886)

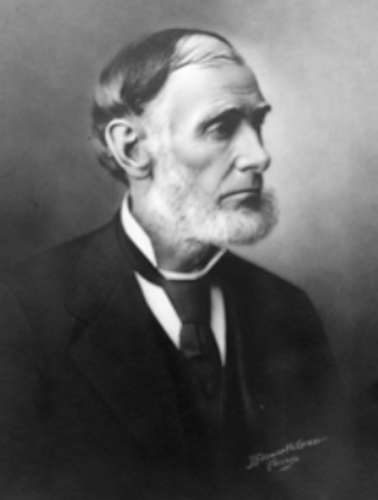
Scates's portrait at the Illinois Supreme Court.

Walter Bennett Scates (January 18, 1808 – October 26, 1886) was an American lawyer and jurist.

Born in South Boston, Virginia, Scates moved with his parents to a farm near Hopkinsville, Kentucky and then learned the printer's trade in Nashville, Tennessee. He studied law in Louisville, Kentucky and then moved to West Frankfort, Illinois where he practiced law. Scates served as county surveyor and state's attorney pro temp. In 1836, Scates served as Illinois Attorney General and then as Illinois Circuit Court judge. In 1841, Scates was elected to the Illinois Supreme Court and served until 1847. Scates served as a delegate to the 1848 Illinois Constitutional Convention. From 1852 until 1857, Scates again served in the Illinois Supreme Court and was chief justice in 1855.

During the American Civil War, Scates served as a staff officer in the Union Army. He ended the war as major and was brevetted brigadier general. President Abraham Lincoln nominated Scates to be Governor of the New Mexico Territory but Scates turned down the nomination. He was collector of customs for the Port of Chicago, Illinois from 1866 to 1869 and continued to practice law in Chicago, Illinois. Scates died in Evanston, Illinois.

== Notes ==
Legal offices
| Preceded by Jesse B. Thomas, Jr. | Attorney General of Illinois; 1836 – 1837 | Succeeded by Usher F. Linder |
