= 1964 United States presidential election in Virginia =

- November 3, 1964

Nominee	Lyndon B. Johnson	Barry Goldwater
Party	Democratic	Republican
Home state	Texas	Arizona
Running mate	Hubert Humphrey	William E. Miller
Electoral vote	12	0
Popular vote	558,038	481,334
Percentage	53.53%	46.17%

Johnson
50–60%
60–70%
70–80%
80–90%
90–100%
Goldwater
50–60%
60–70%
70–80%
80–90%
90–100%
Other
Tie
No vote
President before election
Lyndon B. Johnson
Democratic
Elected President
Lyndon B. Johnson
Democratic

The 1964 United States presidential election in Virginia took place on November 3, 1964. All 50 states and the District of Columbia were part of the 1964 United States presidential election. Virginia voters chose 12 electors to the Electoral College, which selected the president and vice president of the United States.

For the previous six decades Virginia had almost completely disenfranchised its black and poor white populations through the use of a cumulative poll tax and literacy tests. So restricted was suffrage in this period that it has been calculated that a third of Virginia's electorate during the first half of the twentieth century comprised state employees and officeholders.

This limited electorate allowed Virginian politics to be controlled for four decades by the Byrd Organization, as progressive “antiorganization” factions were rendered impotent by the inability of almost all their potential electorate to vote. Historical fusion with the “Readjuster” Democrats, defection of substantial proportions of the Northeast-aligned white electorate of the Shenandoah Valley and Southwest Virginia over free silver, and an early move towards a “lily white” Jim Crow party meant Republicans retained a small but permanent number of legislative seats and local offices in the western part of the state.

In 1928, the GOP did carry the state's presidential electoral votes due to anti-Catholicism against Al Smith, but it was 1952 before any real changes occurred, as in-migration from the traditionally Republican Northeast meant that growing Washington, D.C., and Richmond suburbs would turn Republican not just in presidential elections but in Congressional ones as well, although the Republicans would not make significant gains in the state legislature. Opposition to the black civil rights legislation of Harry S. Truman meant that the Byrd Organization did not support Adlai Stevenson II or John F. Kennedy. Although the Organization viewed the national Republican party as no better on civil rights—it opposed the “massive resistance” orchestrated by Senator Byrd after Brown v. Board of Education—Byrd's silence helped Eisenhower and Nixon win the state three consecutive times between 1952 and 1960.

For 1964, it was evident that Virginia's electorate would be substantially increased by the Twenty-fourth Amendment, which banned the poll tax in federal elections and allowed major increases in voter registration during the preceding year. Efforts by civil rights groups to register black voters would help black voter registration double vis-à-vis 1960. At the same time, Republican nominee Arizona Senator Barry Goldwater voted against the Civil Rights Act and targeted the South as critical to winning the election against incumbent President Lyndon B. Johnson who signed that Act in August 1964, whilst most Byrd Democrats endorsed Johnson—this being the first time since 1936 the Organization had done so. Virginia would not vote for a Democrat again until 2008, after which it has always gone Democratic.

== Predictions ==
Source	Ranking	As of
The Wall Street Journal	Likely R	September 29, 1964
Honolulu Advertiser	Lean D (flip)	October 18, 1964
The Progress-Index	Tilt D (flip)	October 25, 1964
The Chicago Tribune	Tossup	October 29, 1964
Fort Lauderdale News	Tilt R	November 1, 1964
The Charlotte Observer	Lean D (flip)	November 1, 1964
Los Angeles Times	Tossup	November 1, 1964

== Results ==
1964 United States presidential election in Virginia
Party	Candidate	Votes	Percentage	Electoral votes
Democratic	Lyndon B. Johnson (inc.)	558,038	53.53%	12
Republican	Barry Goldwater	481,334	46.17%	0
Socialist Labor	Eric Hass	2,895	0.28%	0
American Nazi	George Lincoln Rockwell (write-in)	212	0.02%	0
Totals		1,042,479	100.00%	12

=== Results by county or independent city ===
County or city	Lyndon B. Johnson Democratic		Barry Goldwater Republican		Eric Hass Socialist Labor		Margin		Total votes cast
County or city	#	%	#	%	#	%	#	%	Total votes cast
Accomack	3,528	52.79%	3,145	47.06%	10	0.15%	383	5.73%	6,683
Albemarle	3,062	48.49%	3,251	51.48%	2	0.03%	-189	-2.99%	6,315
Alexandria	16,828	65.52%	8,825	34.36%	30	0.12%	8,003	31.16%	25,683
Alleghany	1,580	58.85%	1,104	41.12%	1	0.04%	476	17.73%	2,685
Amelia	884	39.48%	1,348	60.21%	7	0.31%	-464	-20.73%	2,239
Amherst	2,730	50.46%	2,675	49.45%	5	0.09%	55	1.01%	5,410
Appomattox	1,339	35.32%	2,444	64.47%	8	0.21%	-1,105	-29.15%	3,791
Arlington	33,567	61.75%	20,485	37.68%	311	0.57%	13,082	24.07%	54,363
Augusta	4,039	48.24%	4,327	51.68%	6	0.07%	-288	-3.44%	8,372
Bath	770	59.88%	516	40.12%	0	0.00%	254	19.76%	1,286
Bedford	4,076	51.50%	3,806	48.09%	32	0.40%	270	3.41%	7,914
Bland	851	54.20%	717	45.67%	2	0.13%	134	8.53%	1,570
Botetourt	2,377	53.11%	2,098	46.87%	1	0.02%	279	6.24%	4,476
Bristol	2,429	65.24%	1,289	34.62%	5	0.13%	1,140	30.62%	3,723
Brunswick	1,883	42.35%	2,560	57.58%	3	0.07%	-677	-15.23%	4,446
Buchanan	4,756	66.76%	2,349	32.97%	19	0.27%	2,407	33.79%	7,124
Buckingham	1,182	43.25%	1,547	56.60%	4	0.15%	-365	-13.35%	2,733
Buena Vista	691	59.93%	459	39.81%	3	0.26%	232	20.12%	1,153
Campbell	3,401	37.19%	5,713	62.47%	31	0.34%	-2,312	-25.28%	9,145
Caroline	2,064	63.64%	1,166	35.95%	13	0.40%	898	27.69%	3,243
Carroll	2,517	40.95%	3,617	58.85%	12	0.20%	-1,100	-17.90%	6,146
Charles City	1,023	75.89%	323	23.96%	2	0.15%	700	51.93%	1,348
Charlotte	1,191	37.48%	1,974	62.11%	13	0.41%	-783	-24.63%	3,178
Charlottesville	5,205	53.64%	4,415	45.50%	84	0.87%	790	8.14%	9,704
Chesapeake	9,532	51.19%	9,038	48.54%	51	0.27%	494	2.65%	18,621
Chesterfield	8,376	32.38%	17,486	67.59%	9	0.03%	-9,110	-35.21%	25,871
Clarke	1,136	51.50%	1,068	48.41%	2	0.09%	68	3.09%	2,206
Clifton Forge	1,252	59.56%	850	40.44%	0	0.00%	402	19.12%	2,102
Colonial Heights	1,198	33.09%	2,420	66.85%	2	0.06%	-1,222	-33.76%	3,620
Covington	2,055	64.10%	1,149	35.84%	2	0.06%	906	28.26%	3,206
Craig	767	61.66%	477	38.34%	0	0.00%	290	23.32%	1,244
Culpeper	1,886	51.46%	1,775	48.43%	4	0.11%	111	3.03%	3,665
Cumberland	871	44.06%	1,099	55.59%	7	0.35%	-228	-11.53%	1,977
Danville	4,539	35.67%	7,900	62.09%	285	2.24%	-3,361	-26.42%	12,724
Dickenson	3,485	61.80%	2,143	38.00%	11	0.20%	1,342	23.80%	5,639
Dinwiddie	2,182	50.92%	2,096	48.91%	7	0.16%	86	2.01%	4,285
Essex	760	49.03%	789	50.90%	1	0.06%	-29	-1.87%	1,550
Fairfax	48,680	61.22%	30,755	38.68%	82	0.10%	17,925	22.54%	79,517
Fairfax City	2,835	59.48%	1,924	40.37%	7	0.15%	911	19.11%	4,766
Falls Church	2,371	63.96%	1,329	35.85%	7	0.19%	1,042	28.11%	3,707
Fauquier	3,506	62.46%	2,101	37.43%	6	0.11%	1,405	25.03%	5,613
Floyd	1,144	38.32%	1,836	61.51%	5	0.17%	-692	-23.19%	2,985
Fluvanna County	1,008	54.96%	823	44.87%	3	0.16%	185	10.09%	1,834
Franklin	3,447	60.08%	2,279	39.72%	11	0.19%	1,168	20.36%	5,737
Franklin City	1,257	61.59%	783	38.36%	1	0.05%	474	23.23%	2,041
Frederick	2,880	52.61%	2,585	47.22%	9	0.16%	295	5.39%	5,474
Fredericksburg	2,410	61.35%	1,511	38.47%	7	0.18%	899	22.88%	3,928
Galax	717	50.64%	697	49.22%	2	0.14%	20	1.42%	1,416
Giles	3,133	60.63%	1,952	37.78%	82	1.59%	1,181	22.85%	5,167
Gloucester	1,949	54.40%	1,631	45.52%	3	0.08%	318	8.88%	3,583
Goochland	1,452	53.84%	1,241	46.01%	4	0.15%	211	7.83%	2,697
Grayson	3,238	50.98%	3,105	48.88%	9	0.14%	133	2.10%	6,352
Greene	460	41.67%	641	58.06%	3	0.27%	-181	-16.39%	1,104
Greensville	2,262	50.06%	2,245	49.68%	12	0.27%	17	0.38%	4,519
Halifax	2,198	35.77%	3,928	63.93%	18	0.29%	-1,730	-28.16%	6,144
Hampton	13,542	60.76%	8,731	39.17%	15	0.07%	4,811	21.59%	22,288
Hanover	2,864	36.95%	4,879	62.95%	8	0.10%	-2,015	-26.00%	7,751
Harrisonburg	1,765	49.16%	1,820	50.70%	5	0.14%	-55	-1.54%	3,590
Henrico	12,779	30.37%	29,286	69.59%	17	0.04%	-16,507	-39.22%	42,082
Henry	5,295	64.70%	2,844	34.75%	45	0.55%	2,451	29.95%	8,184
Highland	476	48.13%	511	51.67%	2	0.20%	-35	-3.54%	989
Hopewell	2,498	43.89%	3,183	55.93%	10	0.18%	-685	-12.04%	5,691
Isle of Wight	2,656	60.38%	1,737	39.49%	6	0.14%	919	20.89%	4,399
James City	1,744	61.43%	1,092	38.46%	3	0.11%	652	22.97%	2,839
King and Queen	786	52.79%	699	46.94%	4	0.27%	87	5.85%	1,489
King George	1,085	62.75%	644	37.25%	0	0.00%	441	25.50%	1,729
King William	904	45.77%	1,065	53.92%	6	0.30%	-161	-8.15%	1,975
Lancaster	1,245	42.77%	1,663	57.13%	3	0.10%	-418	-14.36%	2,911
Lee	5,151	59.71%	3,463	40.15%	12	0.14%	1,688	19.56%	8,626
Loudoun	4,278	62.21%	2,594	37.72%	5	0.07%	1,684	24.49%	6,877
Louisa	1,731	55.78%	1,369	44.12%	3	0.10%	362	11.66%	3,103
Lunenburg	1,128	37.89%	1,847	62.04%	2	0.07%	-719	-24.15%	2,977
Lynchburg	6,758	40.14%	10,044	59.66%	32	0.19%	-3,286	-19.52%	16,834
Madison	862	44.83%	1,060	55.12%	1	0.05%	-198	-10.29%	1,923
Martinsville	2,943	61.01%	1,805	37.42%	76	1.58%	1,138	23.59%	4,824
Mathews	1,137	49.74%	1,149	50.26%	0	0.00%	-12	-0.52%	2,286
Mecklenburg	3,238	39.36%	4,976	60.48%	13	0.16%	-1,738	-21.12%	8,227
Middlesex	973	48.77%	1,019	51.08%	3	0.15%	-46	-2.31%	1,995
Montgomery	3,872	45.61%	4,604	54.23%	13	0.15%	-732	-8.62%	8,489
Nansemond	4,804	64.79%	2,590	34.93%	21	0.28%	2,214	29.86%	7,415
Nelson	1,635	64.52%	893	35.24%	6	0.24%	742	29.28%	2,534
New Kent	684	50.11%	677	49.60%	4	0.29%	7	0.51%	1,365
Newport News	15,296	59.07%	10,584	40.87%	14	0.05%	4,712	18.20%	25,894
Norfolk	32,388	62.83%	18,429	35.75%	729	1.41%	13,959	27.08%	51,546
Northampton	1,516	48.86%	1,586	51.11%	1	0.03%	-70	-2.25%	3,103
Northumberland	988	40.86%	1,423	58.85%	7	0.29%	-435	-17.99%	2,418
Norton	824	68.90%	372	31.10%	0	0.00%	452	37.80%	1,196
Nottoway	2,138	47.52%	2,353	52.30%	8	0.18%	-215	-4.78%	4,499
Orange	1,508	48.54%	1,595	51.34%	4	0.13%	-87	-2.80%	3,107
Page	2,606	48.09%	2,804	51.74%	9	0.17%	-198	-3.65%	5,419
Patrick	2,306	61.07%	1,468	38.88%	2	0.05%	838	22.19%	3,776
Petersburg	4,521	58.15%	3,253	41.84%	1	0.01%	1,268	16.31%	7,775
Pittsylvania	5,228	42.25%	7,120	57.54%	25	0.20%	-1,892	-15.29%	12,373
Portsmouth	16,073	65.49%	8,420	34.31%	51	0.21%	7,653	31.18%	24,544
Powhatan	969	45.03%	1,182	54.93%	1	0.05%	-213	-9.90%	2,152
Prince Edward	1,512	37.20%	2,545	62.62%	7	0.17%	-1,033	-25.42%	4,064
Prince George	1,502	45.58%	1,790	54.32%	3	0.09%	-288	-8.74%	3,295
Prince William	5,611	62.60%	3,343	37.30%	9	0.10%	2,268	25.30%	8,963
Pulaski	3,620	53.82%	3,101	46.10%	5	0.07%	519	7.72%	6,726
Radford	1,850	55.09%	1,505	44.82%	3	0.09%	345	10.27%	3,358
Rappahannock	675	59.89%	449	39.84%	3	0.27%	226	20.05%	1,127
Richmond	636	41.30%	901	58.51%	3	0.19%	-265	-17.21%	1,540
Richmond City	35,662	56.71%	27,196	43.24%	32	0.05%	8,466	13.47%	62,890
Roanoke	8,808	45.09%	10,714	54.84%	14	0.07%	-1,906	-9.75%	19,536
Roanoke City	15,314	53.74%	13,164	46.20%	18	0.06%	2,150	7.54%	28,496
Rockbridge	2,599	54.08%	2,200	45.78%	7	0.15%	399	8.30%	4,806
Rockingham	4,205	50.28%	4,155	49.68%	3	0.04%	50	0.60%	8,363
Russell	4,330	58.78%	3,012	40.89%	25	0.34%	1,318	17.89%	7,367
Scott	4,720	50.92%	4,533	48.90%	16	0.17%	187	2.02%	9,269
Shenandoah	3,184	44.42%	3,981	55.54%	3	0.04%	-797	-11.12%	7,168
Smyth	4,113	51.72%	3,830	48.16%	9	0.11%	283	3.56%	7,952
South Boston	636	34.51%	1,206	65.44%	1	0.05%	-570	-30.93%	1,843
Southampton	2,566	62.74%	1,520	37.16%	4	0.10%	1,046	25.58%	4,090
Spotsylvania	2,097	62.28%	1,261	37.45%	9	0.27%	836	24.83%	3,367
Stafford	2,469	56.58%	1,888	43.26%	7	0.16%	581	13.32%	4,364
Staunton	2,705	47.62%	2,969	52.27%	6	0.11%	-264	-4.65%	5,680
Suffolk	1,579	51.87%	1,463	48.06%	2	0.07%	116	3.81%	3,044
Surry	1,131	52.85%	1,004	46.92%	5	0.23%	127	5.93%	2,140
Sussex	1,234	44.47%	1,537	55.39%	4	0.14%	-303	-10.92%	2,775
Tazewell	6,081	64.57%	3,231	34.31%	105	1.12%	2,850	30.26%	9,417
Virginia Beach	12,892	55.00%	10,529	44.92%	21	0.09%	2,363	10.08%	23,442
Warren	2,494	56.81%	1,886	42.96%	10	0.23%	608	13.85%	4,390
Washington	5,070	54.95%	4,146	44.94%	10	0.11%	924	10.01%	9,226
Waynesboro	2,369	52.28%	2,107	46.50%	55	1.21%	262	5.78%	4,531
Westmoreland	1,312	52.50%	1,181	47.26%	6	0.24%	131	5.24%	2,499
Williamsburg	1,171	55.95%	906	43.29%	16	0.76%	265	12.66%	2,093
Winchester	2,254	50.80%	2,180	49.13%	3	0.07%	74	1.67%	4,437
Wise	7,220	68.51%	3,309	31.40%	10	0.09%	3,911	37.11%	10,539
Wythe	2,879	49.10%	2,958	50.45%	26	0.44%	-79	-1.35%	5,863
York	3,385	52.98%	2,992	46.83%	12	0.19%	393	6.15%	6,389
Totals	558,038	53.54%	481,334	46.18%	2,895	0.28%	76,704	7.36%	1,042,267

==== Counties that flipped from Democratic to Republican ====
- Appomattox
- Brunswick
- Buckingham
- Campbell
- Charlotte
- Halifax
- Lunenburg
- Mecklenburg
- Northampton
- Nottoway
- Pittsylvania
- Prince George
- Sussex

==== Counties and independent cities that flipped from Republican to Democratic ====
- Arlington
- Bath
- Bland
- Botetourt
- Bristol
- Buena Vista
- Charlottesville
- Clifton Forge
- Culpeper
- Fairfax
- Fauquier
- Fluvanna
- Frederick
- Fredericksburg
- Galax
- Gloucester
- Grayson
- Hampton
- James City
- Loudoun
- Martinsville
- New Kent
- Newport News
- Norton
- Pulaski
- Radford
- Richmond City
- Roanoke City
- Rockbridge
- Rockingham
- Scott
- Smyth
- Washington
- Waynesboro
- Westmoreland
- Williamsburg
- Winchester
- York

== Analysis ==
Virginia was won by Johnson with 53.54 percent of the vote, making this the first time since 1948 that Virginia backed a Democratic presidential candidate. Johnson won the national election in a landslide with 61.05 percent of the vote, which actually made Virginia Goldwater's tenth-best state nationally, 15.22 percentage points more Republican than the nation at large. Johnson's victory saw major changes in Virginia voting patterns compared to previous presidential elections. Despite the state shifting from Richard Nixon to Johnson, nine counties in the Southside region, which had been the stronghold of the Byrd Organization, shifted from Kennedy to Goldwater due to opposition to Johnson's civil rights proposals by an almost exclusively white electorate. In Charlotte County, Johnson lost 29 points from John F. Kennedy’s 1960 vote percentage. At the same time, the Shenandoah Valley, where pietistic Protestant sects supportive of civil rights were influential, alongside the heavily unionized southwestern coalfields and Northeastern-aligned Northern Virginia, saw a strong swing towards Johnson, aided by growth in poor white voter registration from the Twenty-Fourth Amendment. Despite this, a majority of white Virginians undoubtedly backed Goldwater, and a doubling of a black presidential vote that almost unanimously supported Johnson was critical for his win.

As of the 2024 presidential election, this remains the last occasion when Amherst County, Bland County, Clarke County, Culpeper County, Fauquier County, Frederick County, Rockingham County, Washington County, York County and the city of Waynesboro have voted for a Democratic presidential candidate. Prince William County and Winchester City would not vote Democratic again until 2008. Fairfax County, Virginia's most populous county, would not vote Democratic again until 2004, having previously voted Democratic in 1940. The independent city of Virginia Beach would not vote Democratic again until 2020. This also remains the last time that Virginia and neighboring West Virginia would simultaneously vote Democratic in a presidential election.
