= Grandmaster Slice =

American hip-hop musician

Grandmaster Slice was an American hip-hop musician whose album Electric Slide (Shall We Dance) helped popularize the electric slide dance.

Slice was born in South Boston, Virginia and attended Halifax County High School. Slice's collaboration with Scratchmaster Chuck T. (Charles Fulp) included the underground rap hit "Thinking of You," which led to Slice's being signed by Jive Records. Their album The Electric Slide (Shall We Dance) came out in 1991.

Slice died October 17, 2021.

== Albums ==
- Electric Slide (Shall We Dance) (1991) Jive Records
