= Michael Tucker (baseball) =

American baseball player (born 1971)

- Outfielder
- Born: June 25, 1971 (age 55); South Boston, Virginia, U.S.
- Batted: Left Threw: Right

MLB debut
- April 26, 1995, for the Kansas City Royals

Last MLB appearance
- October 1, 2006, for the New York Mets

MLB statistics
- Batting average: .256
- Home runs: 125
- Runs batted in: 528
- Stats at Baseball Reference

Teams
- Kansas City Royals (1995–1996); Atlanta Braves (1997–1998); Cincinnati Reds (1999–2001); Chicago Cubs (2001); Kansas City Royals (2002–2003); San Francisco Giants (2004–2005); Philadelphia Phillies (2005); New York Mets (2006)

Michael Anthony Tucker (born June 25, 1971) is an American former Major League Baseball outfielder and first baseman. Tucker played with the Kansas City Royals (1995-1996, 2002-2003), Atlanta Braves (1997-1998), Cincinnati Reds (1999-2001), Chicago Cubs (2001), San Francisco Giants (2004-2005), Philadelphia Phillies (2005) and New York Mets (2006). He batted left-handed and threw right-handed.

== Early career ==
He attended the then Longwood College (at the time an NCAA Division II school) from 1989 through 1992. In November 2005, Tucker was among the selection of Longwood's first Hall of Fame class, including basketball player Jerome Kersey and LPGA golfer Tina Barrett.

After college, Tucker begin his pro baseball career in the minors in 1993. Tucker spent most of the 1993 season with the Single-A Carolina League Wilmington Blue Rocks. Before making the move up to Double-A and spending time with the Memphis Chicks of the Southern League. In 1994, Tucker played in Triple-A with the Omaha Royals of the American Association before joining Major League Baseball and the Kansas City Royals.

== Major League career ==
Tucker made his Major League debut for the Royals at age 23 on April 26, 1995. Starting in left field and batting leadoff, Tucker singled in his first big-league at-bat against pitcher Mike Mussina in a 5–1 win over the Baltimore Orioles. Before the 1997 season, Tucker was traded to the Braves along with Keith Lockhart in exchange for outfielder Jermaine Dye and pitcher Jamie Walker.

Tucker enjoyed his most productive season in 1997 with the Braves, when he posted career highs in batting average (.283), runs (80) and hits (141) in 138 games. In 2004, for the Giants, he played 106 games in right field and 25 in center. He ended the year with a .256 average, 13 home runs, 62 RBI, 77 runs, and a .340 on-base percentage. In nine of his 10 seasons, he collected 11 or more home runs, with a career-high 15 in 2000. Tucker hit the first regular season home run at Turner Field off Kevin Foster in the third inning of the Braves' 5–4 victory over the Chicago Cubs on April 4, 1997.

In August 2005, San Francisco traded Tucker to the Philadelphia Phillies for minor leaguer Kelvin Pichardo. Tucker, whose playing time had been limited that season after starting for most of 2004, joined a Phillies team in the heart of the playoff chase.

On January 9, 2006, Tucker agreed to a one-year contract with the Washington Nationals. On August 9, Tucker's contract was purchased by the New York Mets from the Triple-A Norfolk Tides after Cliff Floyd was placed on the 15-Day DL. On May 17, 2007, Tucker signed a minor league contract with the Boston Red Sox, but was released on July 7 of the same year.

== Return to pro baseball ==
In 2009, Tucker came back to baseball by signing with the Newark Bears of the Atlantic League. He was inactivated, after playing 12 games hitting .231 and considered retirement in May 2009. But Tucker signed with the Southern Maryland Blue Crabs on July 15, 2009, and, in 57 games, he hit .332.
