= South Boston, Virginia =

- Town
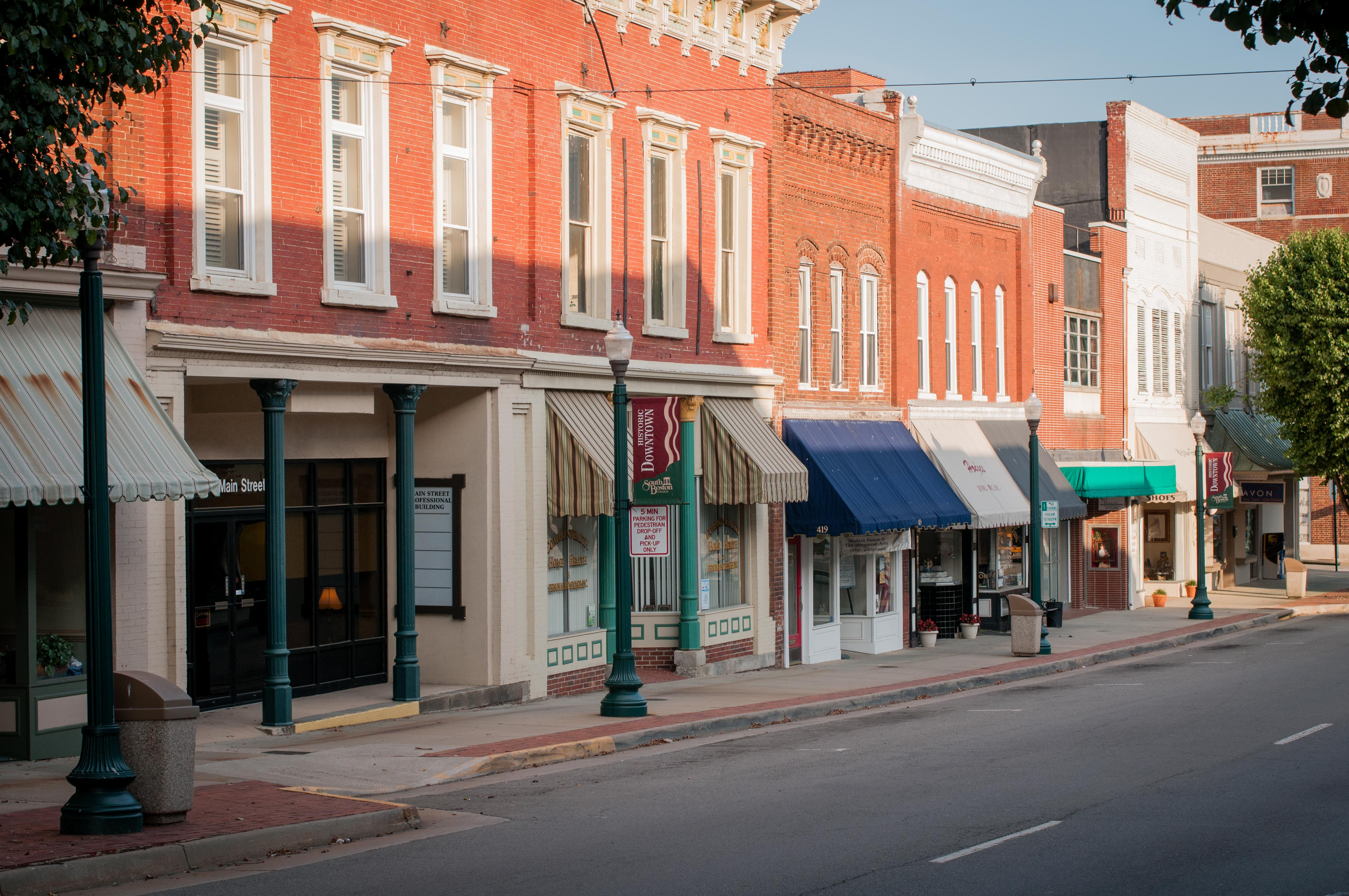
- South Boston Historic District
- Nickname: SoBo
- Location of South Boston in Halifax County, Virginia
- Coordinates: 36°42′28″N 78°54′12″W
- Country: United States
- State: Virginia
- County: Halifax

Government
  - Mayor: Edward Owens

Area
  - Total: 13.15 sq mi (34.07 km^{2})
  - Land: 13.06 sq mi (33.83 km^{2})
  - Water: 0.093 sq mi (0.24 km^{2})
- Elevation: 430 ft (130 m)

Population (2020)
  - Total: 7,966
  - Density: 605.57/sq mi (233.81/km^{2})
- Time zone: UTC−5 (Eastern (EST))
  - Summer (DST): UTC−4 (EDT)
- ZIP Code: 24592
- Area code: 434
- FIPS code: 51-73712
- GNIS feature ID: 1501641
- Website: www.southboston.com

South Boston, formerly Boyd's Ferry, is a town in Halifax County, Virginia, United States. As of the 2020 census, South Boston had a population of 7,966. It is the most populous town in Halifax County.

== History ==
United States presidential election results for South Boston, Virginia
Year	Republican		Democratic		Third party(ies)	
Year	No.	%	No.	%	No.	%
1960	807	62.70%	477	37.06%	3	0.23%
1964	1,206	65.44%	636	34.51%	1	0.05%
1968	1,298	50.17%	620	23.97%	669	25.86%
1972	1,865	71.59%	709	27.22%	31	1.19%
1976	1,389	56.97%	1,001	41.06%	48	1.97%
1980	1,615	60.97%	971	36.66%	63	2.38%
1984	1,899	65.64%	974	33.67%	20	0.69%
1988	1,694	64.05%	936	35.39%	15	0.57%
1992	1,435	52.05%	1,051	38.12%	271	9.83%

On December 8, 1796, the Virginia General Assembly authorized eight commissioners to establish at Boyd's Ferry on the south side of the Dan River the town of South Boston, named for Boston, Massachusetts. Because this site proved vulnerable to flooding, it was eventually abandoned in favor of a new settlement on the north side. By the 1850s the Richmond and Danville Railroad passed through South Boston, which eventually developed into an important market for brightleaf tobacco. In 1884 it was incorporated as a town; in 1960 it became an independent city; and in 1995 it made history by being the first city in Virginia to revert to town status and rejoined Halifax County.

Within the town limits Berry Hill Plantation, E. L. Evans House, Reedy Creek Site, South Boston Historic District, are listed on the National Register of Historic Places. Fourqurean House, Glennmary, Glenwood, Tarover, and Seaton are nearby.

South Boston was home to the National Tobacco Festival (a typically three day annual festival held every fall) from its inception in 1935 to 1941, when it was suspended during World War II. In 1948, the festival was moved to Richmond when it outgrew the town. It was held in Richmond until 1984, when it was canceled due to rising production costs and decreased interest. South Boston was the second largest producer of tobacco in the United States until the Great Depression.

== Geography ==
South Boston is located south of the center of Halifax County at 36°42′28″N 78°54′12″W (36.707722, −78.903388). It is bordered to the south by the unincorporated community of Riverdale. U.S. Route 501 passes through the center of the town, leading north 5 miles (8 km) to Halifax, the county seat, and south 23 miles (37 km) to Roxboro, North Carolina. U.S. Route 360 crosses the southeastern corner of the town limits, leading northeast 37 miles (60 km) to Keysville and west 31 miles (50 km) to Danville. U.S. Route 58 passes through the southernmost part of South Boston with US 360, leading west with it to Danville but running east 48 miles (77 km) to South Hill.

According to the United States Census Bureau, South Boston has a total area of 13.2 square miles (34.1 km^{2}), of which 13.1 square miles (33.8 km^{2}) are land and 0.1 square miles (0.3 km^{2}), or 0.74%, are water. The Dan River, a tributary of the Roanoke River, flows to the east along the southern edge of the town.

== Climate ==
Climate data for South Boston, Virginia (1991–2020 normals, extremes 1947–present)
Month	Jan	Feb	Mar	Apr	May	Jun	Jul	Aug	Sep	Oct	Nov	Dec	Year
Record high °F (°C)	80 (27)	83 (28)	90 (32)	95 (35)	98 (37)	103 (39)	107 (42)	104 (40)	106 (41)	102 (39)	88 (31)	80 (27)	104 (40)
Mean maximum °F (°C)	69.4 (20.8)	72.6 (22.6)	80.3 (26.8)	86.5 (30.3)	89.9 (32.2)	94.6 (34.8)	96.8 (36.0)	95.3 (35.2)	91.8 (33.2)	85.9 (29.9)	77.9 (25.5)	71.4 (21.9)	97.9 (36.6)
Mean daily maximum °F (°C)	50.7 (10.4)	54.0 (12.2)	61.9 (16.6)	71.8 (22.1)	78.7 (25.9)	86.2 (30.1)	90.0 (32.2)	88.3 (31.3)	82.6 (28.1)	72.8 (22.7)	62.6 (17.0)	53.8 (12.1)	71.1 (21.7)
Daily mean °F (°C)	38.6 (3.7)	41.1 (5.1)	48.1 (8.9)	57.5 (14.2)	66.0 (18.9)	74.3 (23.5)	78.7 (25.9)	77.1 (25.1)	70.8 (21.6)	59.3 (15.2)	48.6 (9.2)	41.6 (5.3)	58.5 (14.7)
Mean daily minimum °F (°C)	26.5 (−3.1)	28.2 (−2.1)	34.2 (1.2)	43.3 (6.3)	53.4 (11.9)	62.5 (16.9)	67.4 (19.7)	65.9 (18.8)	59.0 (15.0)	45.7 (7.6)	34.7 (1.5)	29.3 (−1.5)	45.8 (7.7)
Mean minimum °F (°C)	9.5 (−12.5)	14.4 (−9.8)	19.1 (−7.2)	29.0 (−1.7)	38.6 (3.7)	50.7 (10.4)	57.8 (14.3)	56.6 (13.7)	45.9 (7.7)	30.8 (−0.7)	21.3 (−5.9)	16.6 (−8.6)	8.0 (−13.3)
Record low °F (°C)	−7 (−22)	1 (−17)	9 (−13)	18 (−8)	28 (−2)	38 (3)	42 (6)	39 (4)	29 (−2)	19 (−7)	10 (−12)	−4 (−20)	−7 (−22)
Average precipitation inches (mm)	3.56 (90)	2.95 (75)	4.03 (102)	3.67 (93)	4.35 (110)	4.88 (124)	4.01 (102)	3.82 (97)	4.69 (119)	3.43 (87)	3.40 (86)	3.58 (91)	46.37 (1,178)
Average snowfall inches (cm)	3.0 (7.6)	1.1 (2.8)	0.4 (1.0)	0.0 (0.0)	0.0 (0.0)	0.0 (0.0)	0.0 (0.0)	0.0 (0.0)	0.0 (0.0)	0.0 (0.0)	0.0 (0.0)	1.0 (2.5)	5.5 (14)
Average precipitation days (≥ 0.01 in)	10.4	9.4	10.2	10.1	10.9	9.8	10.3	9.3	9.0	8.7	8.4	10.3	116.8
Average snowy days (≥ 0.1 in)	0.9	0.5	0.3	0.0	0.0	0.0	0.0	0.0	0.0	0.0	0.0	0.4	2.1
Source: NOAA

=== Major highways ===
- US 58
- US 360
- US 501
- SR 34
- SR 129
- SR 304

== Demographics ==
Historical population
Census	Pop.	Note	%±
1880	328		—
1890	1,789		445.4%
1900	1,851		3.5%
1910	3,516		90.0%
1920	4,338		23.4%
1930	4,841		11.6%
1940	5,252		8.5%
1950	6,057		15.3%
1960	5,974		−1.4%
1970	6,889		15.3%
1980	7,093		3.0%
1990	6,997		−1.4%
2000	8,491		21.4%
2010	8,142		−4.1%
2020	7,966		−2.2%
U.S. Decennial Census

As of the census of 2000, there were 8,491 people, 3,502 households, and 2,185 families residing in the town. The population density was 694.7 people per square mile (268.3/km^{2}). There were 3,946 housing units at an average density of 322.8 per square mile (124.7/km^{2}). The racial makeup of the town was 50.63% White, 47.25% African American, 0.21% Native American, 0.48% Asian, 0.51% from other races, and 0.92% from two or more races. Hispanic or Latino of any race were 1.45% of the population.

There were 3,502 households, out of which 29.0% had children under the age of 18 living with them, 39.0% were married couples living together, 20.0% had a female householder with no husband present, and 37.6% were non-families. 34.9% of all households were made up of individuals, and 16.3% had someone living alone who was 65 years of age or older. The average household size was 2.26 and the average family size was 2.90.

In the town, the population was spread out, with 23.7% under the age of 18, 6.7% from 18 to 24, 25.1% from 25 to 44, 23.9% from 45 to 64, and 20.6% who were 65 years of age or older. The median age was 41 years. For every 100 females, there were 79.1 males. For every 100 females aged 18 and over, there were 73.4 males.

The median income for a household in the town was $25,964, and the median income for a family was $34,848. Males had a median income of $28,212 versus $20,371 for females. The per capita income for the town was $15,872. About 15.3% of families and 20.4% of the population were below the poverty line, including 24.2% of those under age 18 and 23.9% of those age 65 or over.

== Education ==
The school district is the Halifax County Public Schools school district.

== Notable places ==
- Southern Virginia Higher Ed Center

== Notable people ==
- Jay Blackton, who won an Academy Award for Best Music, Scoring of a Musical Picture for Oklahoma! (1955), is buried in South Boston.
- Burton family of NASCAR. Brothers Ward and Jeff Burton are from South Boston and prepared for their racing careers at South Boston Speedway. Their children Jeb (Ward) and Harrison (Jeff) are from the city as well.
- Tyrone Davis, NFL player for the New York Jets and Green Bay Packers, is from South Boston.
- Colin Garrett, racing driver
- Jeremy Jeffress, former pitcher for the Milwaukee Brewers and Toronto Blue Jays
- Robert Llewellyn, born in Roanoke, Virginia, is a professional photographer who grew up in South Boston and now lives in Earlysville, Virginia.
- Walter B. Scates, Chief Justice of the Illinois Supreme Court and Illinois Attorney General, born in South Boston
- Grandmaster Slice, American hip-hop musician
- William M. Tuck, 55th Governor of Virginia, born in Halifax County, Virginia and rests in South Boston.
- Michael Tucker, played for seven teams in Major League Baseball
- Greg Vanney, former professional soccer player and head coach of the LA Galaxy
- G. C. Waldrep, poet and historian, was born and raised in South Boston.
- Tisha Waller, Olympic high jumper, is from South Boston.
- Andrew Abbott, UVA Baseball Player and starting pitcher for the Cincinnati Reds.

== See also ==
- List of former counties, cities, and towns of Virginia
