= Halifax County Public Schools =

School district in Virginia, United States

Coordinates: 36.7669°N 78.9225°W

Location
- Halifax County, Virginia United States

District information
- Type: Public
- Grades: PreK–12
- Superintendent: Amy Huskin
- Schools: 10
- NCES District ID: 5101770

Students and staff
- Students: 4,496 (2024–25)
- Teachers: 370.39 (on an FTE basis)
- Student–teacher ratio: 12.14

Other information
- Website: https://www.halifax.k12.va.us/

Halifax County Public Schools is a school district serving Halifax County, Virginia. It consists of seven elementary schools, one middle school, one high school, one early learning center, and a STEM Center. As of the 2024–25 school year, there were 4,496 students enrolled in the district.

== Administration ==
=== School Board ===
There are currently eight members on the Halifax County School Board (2026). They are elected by district.

- District 1: Stacy J. Runion
- District 2: Roy Keith Lloyd
- District 3: Melissa E. Hicks
- District 4: Derek C. Mason, Chair
- District 5: Jimmy D. Clay, Vice Chair
- District 6: Mark A. Gosney
- District 7: Holly A. Comer
- District 8: Walter C. Potts, Jr.

== Schools ==
=== Early Learning Center ===
- South Boston Early Learning Center

=== Elementary schools ===
- Clays Mill Elementary School
- Cluster Springs Elementary School
- Meadville Elementary School
- Scottsburg Elementary School
- Sinai Elementary School
- South Boston Elementary School
- Jennings Elementary School

=== Middle school ===
- Halifax County Middle School

=== High school ===
- Halifax County High School

=== Other schools ===
- Halifax County STEM Academy

== See also ==
- List of school divisions in Virginia
