= Halifax County, Virginia =

County in Virginia, United States

- County
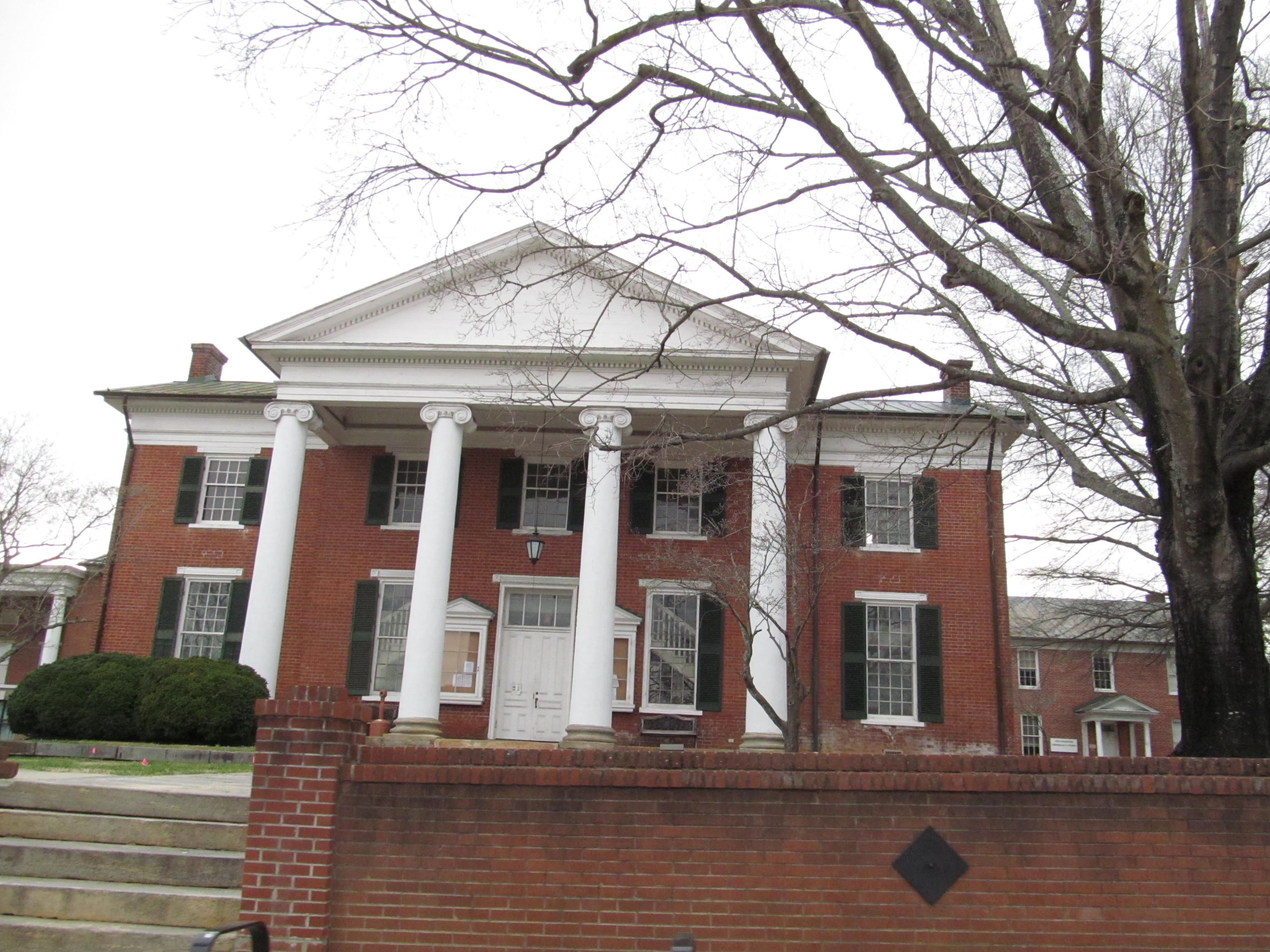
- Halifax County Courthouse

- Seal

- Location within the U.S. state of Virginia
- Coordinates: 36°46′N 78°56′W
- Country: United States
- State: Virginia
- Founded: 1752
- Named for: George Montagu-Dunk, 2nd Earl of Halifax
- Seat: Halifax
- Largest town: South Boston

Area
  - Total: 830 sq mi (2,100 km^{2})
  - Land: 818 sq mi (2,120 km^{2})
  - Water: 12 sq mi (31 km^{2}) 1.4%

Population (2020)
  - Total: 34,022
  - Estimate (2025): 33,447 ▼
  - Density: 41.6/sq mi (16.1/km^{2})
- Time zone: UTC−5 (Eastern)
  - Summer (DST): UTC−4 (EDT)
- Congressional district: 5th
- Website: www.halifaxcountyva.gov

Halifax County is a county located in the Commonwealth of Virginia. As of the 2020 census, the population was 34,022. Its county seat is Halifax.

== History ==
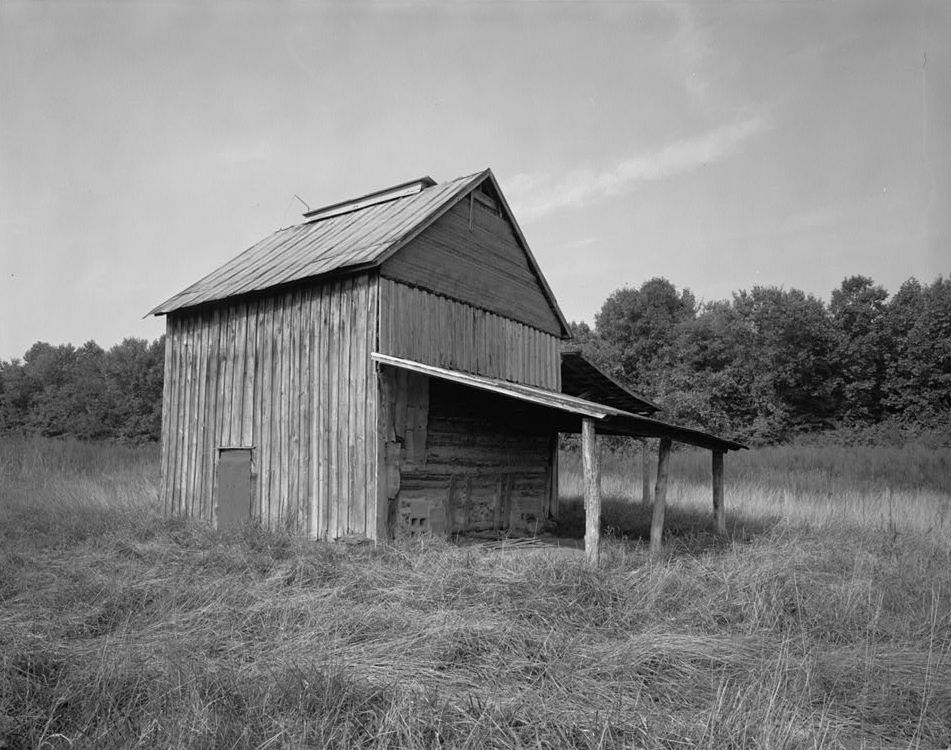
Tobacco barn, Edgewood Farm, Halifax County

Occupied by varying cultures of indigenous peoples for thousands of years, in historic times English colonists encountered Native Americans. Halifax County was established in 1752 by English colonists from Lunenburg County. The county was named for George Montagu-Dunk, 2nd Earl of Halifax.

Through the 1990 Census, South Boston was an independent city, but it became a town again and rejoined Halifax County in 1995.

== Geography ==
According to the U.S. Census Bureau, the county has a total area of 830 square miles (2,100 km^{2}), of which 818 square miles (2,120 km^{2}) is land and 12 square miles (31 km^{2}) (1.4%) is water.

=== Adjacent counties ===
- Campbell County - northwest
- Charlotte County - northeast
- Mecklenburg County - east
- Granville County, North Carolina - southeast
- Person County, North Carolina - south
- Caswell County, North Carolina - southwest
- Pittsylvania County - west

=== Major highways ===
- US 58
- US 360
- US 501
- SR 34
- SR 40
- SR 49
- SR 57
- SR 62
- SR 92
- SR 96
- SR 119
- SR 129
- SR 304
- SR 344
- SR 349
- SR 360

== Demographics ==
Historical population
Census	Pop.	Note	%±
1790	14,722		—
1800	19,377		31.6%
1810	22,133		14.2%
1820	19,060		−13.9%
1830	28,034		47.1%
1840	25,936		−7.5%
1850	25,962		0.1%
1860	26,520		2.1%
1870	27,828		4.9%
1880	33,588		20.7%
1890	34,424		2.5%
1900	37,197		8.1%
1910	40,044		7.7%
1920	41,374		3.3%
1930	41,283		−0.2%
1940	41,271		0.0%
1950	41,442		0.4%
1960	33,637		−18.8%
1970	30,076		−10.6%
1980	30,599		1.7%
1990	29,033		−5.1%
2000	37,355		28.7%
2010	36,241		−3.0%
2020	34,022		−6.1%
2025 (est.)	33,447	▼	−1.7%
U.S. Decennial Census; 1790-1960 1900-1990; 1990-2000 2010 2020

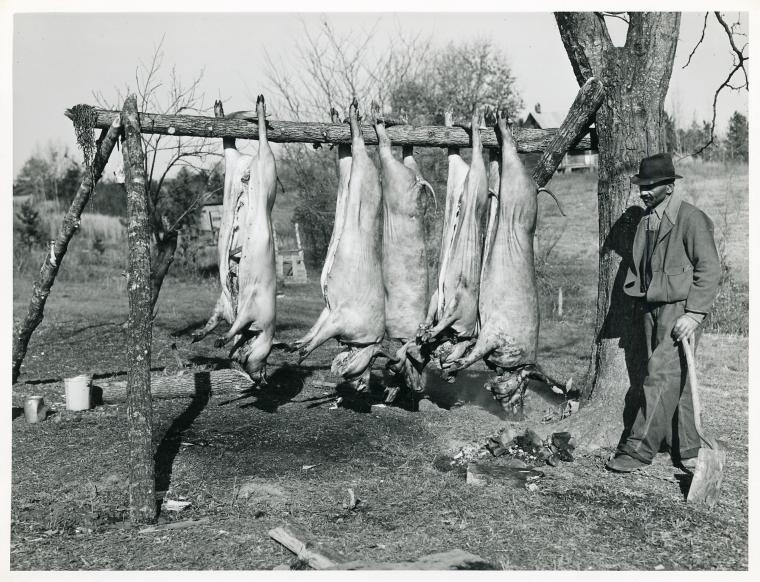
Hog Killing on Milton Puryear Place, Dennison, Halifax County, Marion Post Wolcott, 1939

=== Racial and ethnic composition ===
Halifax County, Virginia – Racial and ethnic composition Note: the US Census treats Hispanic/Latino as an ethnic category. This table excludes Latinos from the racial categories and assigns them to a separate category. Hispanics/Latinos may be of any race.
Race / Ethnicity (NH = Non-Hispanic)	Pop 1980	Pop 1990	Pop 2000	Pop 2010	Pop 2020	% 1980	% 1990	% 2000	% 2010	% 2020
White alone (NH)	18,153	17,440	22,313	21,804	20,250	59.99%	60.49%	59.73%	60.16%	59.52%
Black or African American alone (NH)	12,154	11,333	14,164	13,224	11,738	38.97%	38.53%	37.92%	36.49%	34.50%
Native American or Alaska Native alone (NH)	51	71	68	97	77	0.15%	0.23%	0.18%	0.27%	0.23%
Asian alone (NH)	24	23	91	132	218	0.17%	0.16%	0.24%	0.36%	0.64%
Native Hawaiian or Pacific Islander alone (NH)	x	x	2	4	3	x	x	0.01%	0.01%	0.01%
Other race alone (NH)	28	2	22	37	112	0.09%	0.01%	0.06%	0.10%	0.33%
Mixed race or Multiracial (NH)	x	x	237	356	864	x	x	0.63%	0.98%	2.54%
Hispanic or Latino (any race)	189	164	458	587	760	0.64%	0.58%	1.23%	1.62%	2.23%
Total	30,599	29,033	37,355	36,241	34,022	100.00%	100.00%	100.00%	100.00%	100.00%

=== 2020 census ===
As of the 2020 census, the county had a population of 34,022. The median age was 47.7 years. 20.0% of residents were under the age of 18 and 25.2% of residents were 65 years of age or older. For every 100 females there were 93.0 males, and for every 100 females age 18 and over there were 90.6 males age 18 and over.

The racial makeup of the county was 60.0% White, 34.7% Black or African American, 0.2% American Indian and Alaska Native, 0.6% Asian, 0.0% Native Hawaiian and Pacific Islander, 1.3% from some other race, and 3.1% from two or more races. Hispanic or Latino residents of any race comprised 2.2% of the population.

21.8% of residents lived in urban areas, while 78.2% lived in rural areas.

There were 14,698 households in the county, of which 24.6% had children under the age of 18 living with them and 32.5% had a female householder with no spouse or partner present. About 33.3% of all households were made up of individuals and 17.5% had someone living alone who was 65 years of age or older.

There were 17,275 housing units, of which 14.9% were vacant. Among occupied housing units, 70.8% were owner-occupied and 29.2% were renter-occupied. The homeowner vacancy rate was 1.6% and the rental vacancy rate was 7.4%.

=== 2000 census ===
As of the census of 2000, there were 37,355 people, 15,018 households, and 10,512 families residing in the county. The population density was 46 people per square mile (18 people/km^{2}). There were 16,953 housing units at an average density of 21 units per square mile (8.1 units/km^{2}). The racial makeup of the county was 60.32% White, 38.02% Black or African American, 0.20% Native American, 0.24% Asian, 0.01% Pacific Islander, 0.44% from other races, and 0.77% from two or more races. 1.23% of the population were Hispanic or Latino of any race.

There were 15,018 households, out of which 28.60% had children under the age of 18 living with them, 51.20% were married couples living together, 14.80% had a female householder with no husband present, and 30.00% were non-families. 27.40% of all households were made up of individuals, and 13.10% had someone living alone who was 65 years of age or older. The average household size was 2.43 and the average family size was 2.94.

In the county, the population was spread out, with 23.40% under the age of 18, 6.90% from 18 to 24, 26.40% from 25 to 44, 26.30% from 45 to 64, and 17.10% who were 65 years of age or older. The median age was 41 years. For every 100 females there were 90.80 males. For every 100 females age 18 and over, there were 86.70 males.

The median income for a household in the county was $29,929, and the median income for a family was $37,845. Males had a median income of $27,498 versus $20,684 for females. The per capita income for the county was $16,353. About 11.50% of families and 15.70% of the population were below the poverty line, including 18.90% of those under age 18 and 19.60% of those age 65 or over.

== Government ==
=== Board of Supervisors ===
- District 1: Maurice Riddle, Jr.
- District 2: Larry D Roller
- District 3: Hubert Pannell
- District 4: Dennis Witt
- District 5: Robbie Smart
- District 6: Stanley Brandon
- District 7: Keith McDowell
- District 8: William Bryant Claiborne
- Tie Breaker: Wayne Smith

=== Constitutional officers ===
- Clerk of the Circuit Court: Cathy M. Cosby (I)
- Commissioner of the Revenue: Brenda P. Powell (I)
- Commonwealth's Attorney: Tracy Quackenbush Martin (I)
- Sheriff: Fred S. Clark (I)
- Treasurer: Shana Lynn Hetzell (I)

Halifax is represented by Republicans Tammy Brankley Mulchi in the Virginia Senate, Republicans Danny Marshall and Thomas C. Wright in the Virginia House of Delegates, and Republican John McGuire in the U.S. House of Representatives. Halifax is represented in the United States Senate by Democrats Mark Warner and Tim Kaine.

United States presidential election results for Halifax County, Virginia
Year	Republican		Democratic		Third party(ies)	
Year	No.	%	No.	%	No.	%
1880	1,987	48.49%	2,111	51.51%	0	0.00%
1884	2,954	46.54%	3,393	53.46%	0	0.00%
1888	2,473	40.69%	3,570	58.74%	35	0.58%
1892	1,937	33.80%	3,133	54.68%	660	11.52%
1896	2,050	38.43%	3,231	60.57%	53	0.99%
1900	1,632	35.90%	2,864	63.00%	50	1.10%
1904	594	32.60%	1,198	65.75%	30	1.65%
1908	650	33.64%	1,268	65.63%	14	0.72%
1912	426	23.20%	1,260	68.63%	150	8.17%
1916	493	21.52%	1,781	77.74%	17	0.74%
1920	586	21.73%	2,103	77.98%	8	0.30%
1924	374	14.03%	2,245	84.24%	46	1.73%
1928	1,091	28.46%	2,742	71.54%	0	0.00%
1932	275	7.05%	3,583	91.85%	43	1.10%
1936	302	6.51%	4,331	93.30%	9	0.19%
1940	373	9.75%	3,441	89.94%	12	0.31%
1944	512	13.23%	3,351	86.59%	7	0.18%
1948	521	13.46%	1,323	34.19%	2,026	52.35%
1952	2,274	40.70%	3,296	58.99%	17	0.30%
1956	1,782	30.73%	2,470	42.59%	1,547	26.68%
1960	1,784	39.57%	2,676	59.36%	48	1.06%
1964	3,928	63.93%	2,198	35.77%	18	0.29%
1968	2,634	28.94%	2,199	24.16%	4,269	46.90%
1972	5,469	68.71%	2,384	29.95%	106	1.33%
1976	4,045	46.51%	4,352	50.04%	300	3.45%
1980	5,088	51.73%	4,528	46.03%	220	2.24%
1984	6,726	60.58%	4,231	38.11%	146	1.31%
1988	5,671	56.02%	4,282	42.30%	171	1.69%
1992	5,199	46.16%	4,752	42.19%	1,311	11.64%
1996	6,490	49.07%	5,599	42.33%	1,137	8.60%
2000	7,732	54.95%	5,963	42.37%	377	2.68%
2004	8,363	57.06%	6,220	42.44%	73	0.50%
2008	8,600	51.04%	8,126	48.23%	124	0.74%
2012	8,694	52.08%	7,766	46.53%	232	1.39%
2016	9,704	57.08%	6,897	40.57%	400	2.35%
2020	10,418	57.09%	7,666	42.01%	164	0.90%
2024	10,741	60.10%	6,984	39.08%	146	0.82%

== Communities ==
=== Towns ===
- Halifax
- Scottsburg
- South Boston
- Virgilina

=== Census-designated places ===
- Clover
- Cluster Springs
- Mountain Road
- Nathalie
- Riverdale

=== Other unincorporated communities ===
- Alton
- Cody
- Crystal Hill
- Delila
- Ingram
- Midway (near Scottsburg)
- Turbeville
- Vernon Hill

== Education ==
The school district is the Halifax County Public Schools school district.

== Notable people ==
- Jay Blackton, who won an Academy Award for Best Music, Scoring of a Musical Picture for Oklahoma! (1955), is buried in South Boston.
- Frances Webb Bumpass, newspaper publisher
- James Coles Bruce, Virginia House of Delegates
- Burton family of NASCAR. Brothers Ward and Jeff Burton are from South Boston and prepared for their racing careers at South Boston Speedway. Their children Jeb (Ward) and Harrison (Jeff) are from South Boston.
- Clement Comer Clay, Governor of the U.S. state of Alabama, U.S. House of Representatives, and the United States Senate
- Tyrone Davis, NFL player for the New York Jets and Green Bay Packers, is from South Boston.
- Earl Ferrell, National Football League player
- Luther Hilton Foster (1888-1949), President of Virginia Normal and Industrial School, now Virginia State University, near Petersburg
- Colin Garrett, racing driver
- Henry E. Garrett (1894-1973), prominent psychologist at Columbia and UVa, and supporter of racial segregation
- Grandmaster Slice, American hip-hop musician
- J. Steven Griles (b. 1947), former United States Deputy Secretary of the Interior (2001–04) in the George W. Bush administration, coal lobbyist, implicated in the Jack Abramoff scandal
- Jeremy Jeffress, former pitcher for the Milwaukee Brewers and Toronto Blue Jays
- Henrietta Lacks (1920–1951), source of the HeLa cell line, subject of The Immortal Life of Henrietta Lacks (2010) and The Immortal Life of Henrietta Lacks (film) (2017)
- Willie Lanier (b. 1945), Pro Football Hall of Fame linebacker for Kansas City Chiefs
- Robert Llewellyn, born in Roanoke, Virginia, is a professional photographer who grew up in South Boston and now lives in Earlysville, Virginia.
- Adam Page, professional wrestler known for tenure in All Elite Wrestling, world champion
- Vivian Pinn, physician and scientist
- Walter B. Scates, Chief Justice of the Illinois Supreme Court and Illinois Attorney General, born in South Boston
- Shelby Shackelford, artist
- Carrie Sutherlin, college president
- William M. Tuck, 55th Governor of Virginia, born in Halifax County, Virginia and rests in South Boston.
- Michael Tucker, played for seven teams in Major League Baseball
- Greg Vanney, former professional soccer player and head coach of the LA Galaxy
- G. C. Waldrep, poet and historian, was born and raised in South Boston.
- Tisha Waller, Olympic high jumper, is from South Boston.

== See also ==
- National Register of Historic Places listings in Halifax County, Virginia
