= List of slave cabins and quarters =

This is a list of slave cabins and other notable slave quarters. A number of slave quarters in the United States are individually listed on the National Register of Historic Places. Many more are included as contributing buildings within listings having more substantial plantation houses or other structures as the main contributing resources in a historic district or other listing.

== In fiction and non-fiction ==
- Uncle Tom's Cabin
- Aunt Phillis's Cabin
- The Little Old Log Cabin in the Lane
- Kindred (novel) realistic depictions
- Thomas Jefferson Slave Apartments, a band
- Life at the South; or, "Uncle Tom's Cabin" as It Is
- Tara (plantation), Georgia, of the novel Gone with the Wind
- Casa-Grande & Senzala, Brazil book
- Uncle Tom's Cabin novel

== Caribbean ==
- Wallblake House, Anguilla

=== Netherlands Antilles ===
- Bonaire, Netherlands antilles, pics

=== Puerto Rico ===
- Hacienda Buena Vista, Ponce, Puerto Rico
- Hacienda Santa Rita, Puerto Rico

=== Cuba ===
- Valle de los Ingenios, Cuba, with pic

== South Africa ==
- Leeuwenhof, South Africa

== Canada ==
- Uncle Tom's Cabin Historic Site, Ontario, Canada

== United States ==
=== Alabama ===
- Rosemount (Forkland, Alabama)
- Boxwood Plantation Slave Quarter, Courtland, AL, NRHP-listed
- Dudley Snow House, Alabama
- Faunsdale Plantation, Alabama
- Glencairn (Greensboro, Alabama)
- Magnolia Grove (Greensboro, Alabama)
- First National Bank (Huntsville, Alabama)
- Boxwood Plantation Slave Quarter, Alabama

=== Arkansas ===
- Jackson House (Fayetteville, Arkansas)

=== Connecticut ===
- Captain David Judson House, Connecticut

=== Delaware ===
- Gov. William H. Ross House, a historic plantation near Seaford in Sussex County, Delaware, has Delaware's only documented, surviving slave quarters

=== Florida ===
- Erwin House (Greenwood, Florida)
- Bellevue Plantation, Florida
- Kingsley Plantation, Florida
- Pine Hill Plantation, Florida
- Fort George Island Cultural State Park, Florida
- Gamble Plantation Historic State Park, Florida

=== Georgia ===
- Uncle Remus Museum, Eatonton, Georgia, Putnam County, Georgia, includes a log cabin created from two slave cabins. The museum is dedicated to portraying Southern life as in the Uncle Remus stories.
- Anderson House (Danburg, Georgia)
- Westover (Milledgeville, Georgia)
- St. Simons, Georgia
- Liberty Hall (Crawfordville, Georgia)
- Telfair Museums, Savannah, Georgia
- Callaway Plantation, Georgia
- Bonar Hall, Georgia
- Hamilton Plantation Slave Cabins, St. Simons Island, GA, NRHP-listed
- Travelers Rest (Toccoa, Georgia)
- Gascoigne Bluff
- Golden Isles of Georgia
- Hofwyl-Broadfield Plantation, Georgia
- List of plantations in Georgia (U.S. state)
- Seclusaval and Windsor Spring, Georgia
- Archibald Smith Plantation Home, Georgia
- Stafford Plantation, Georgia
- Stone Mountain, Georgia
- Chief Vann House Historic Site, Georgia
- Owens–Thomas House, Savannah, Georgia, whose slave quarter's ceiling was painted haint blue

=== Kentucky ===
- Beechland (Jeffersontown, Kentucky)
- George W. Johnson Slave Quarters and Smokehouse, Georgetown, KY, NRHP-listed
- McConnell House, Law Office, and Slave Quarters, Wurtland, KY, NRHP-listed
- Garrard County, Kentucky
- McConnell House, Law Office, and Slave Quarters (redlink), NRHP-listed, Wurtland, Kentucky
- Carneal House, Kentucky
- Liberty Hall (Frankfort, Kentucky)
- List of plantations in Kentucky (U.S. state)
- Royal Spring Park, Kentucky
- Sherman Tavern, Kentucky
- Thomas Huey Farm, Kentucky
- Traveler's Rest, NRHP-listed, Lincoln County, Kentucky
- Waveland State Historic Site, Kentucky
- Kimbrough-Hehr House, Kentucky

=== Louisiana ===
- Evergreen Plantation (Wallace, Louisiana)
- Magnolia Plantation (Derry, Louisiana)
- Riverlake, around 8 miles south of New Roads
- Louisiana African American Heritage Trail
- Oakland Plantation (Natchitoches, Louisiana)
- New Orleans African American Museum
- Ashland Plantation, in Darrow
- Audubon State Historic Site, Louisiana
- Evan Hall, in Donaldsonville
- LSU Rural Life Museum in Baton Rouge
- Evan Hall Slave Cabins, in Donaldsonville, NRHP-listed
- Gallier House, New Orleans
- Madame John's Legacy, New Orleans, Louisiana
- Hermann–Grima House, New Orleans, Louisiana
- Hayes, Louisiana
- Kent Plantation House, Alexandria
- Laura Plantation, near Vacherie
- Magnolia Mound Plantation House, in Baton Rouge
- Tally-Ho Plantation House, Bayou Goula
- Laurel Valley Sugar Plantation, Thibodaux
- Hotel Maison De Ville, New Oeleans, Louisiana
- Whitney Plantation Historic District, near Wallace
- Nottoway Plantation, near White Castle
- Uncle Sam Plantation, near Convent
- LaBranche Plantation Dependency, in St. Rose
- Felicity Plantation, in Vacherie

=== Maryland ===
- Spring Hill Farm (Ellicott City, Maryland)
- Belvoir (Crownsville, Maryland)
- Bon Air Manor (Ellicott City, Maryland)
- Sotterley (Hollywood, Maryland)
- National Harbor, Maryland
- Northampton Plantation, Bowie, Maryland
- The Willows (Cavetown, Maryland)
- Bloomsbury (Frederick, Maryland)
- Woodlawn (Columbia, Maryland)
- The Oaks (Ellicott City, Maryland), demolished
- Hampton National Historic Site, Maryland
- Round About Hills, Maryland
- Susanna Farm, Maryland
- L'Hermitage Slave Village Archeological Site, Frederick, MD, NRHP-listed
- MacAlpine, Maryland
- McPherson's Purchase, Maryland
- Arlington (Columbia, Maryland)
- Beall–Dawson House, Maryland
- Cedar Park (Galesville, Maryland)
- Bunker Hill (Millersville, Maryland)
- Seneca Historic District (Poolesville, Maryland)
- List of Howard County properties in the Maryland Historical Trust
- Waverly (Marriottsville, Maryland)
- Friendship Valley Farm, Maryland
- Gray Rock (Ellicott City, Maryland)
- Montgomery County, Maryland
- Riley-Bolten House, Maryland
- Sarah Jane Powell Log Cabin, Maryland
- Clark's Elioak Farm, Maryland
- Oakdale Manor, Maryland
- Cherry Grove, HO-1, Maryland
- Hockley Forge and Mill, Maryland
- Cornehill, Maryland
- River Hill Farm, Maryland
- La Veille, Maryland
- Dowden's Luck, Maryland
- Woburn Manor, Maryland
- John Due House, Maryland
- Hoffman Farm, Maryland

=== Massachusetts ===
- Isaac Royall House, with only surviving slave quarters in Massachusetts

=== Mississippi ===
- Monmouth (Natchez, Mississippi)
- Canemount Plantation, Mississippi
- Reuben Davis House, Mississippi
- Rosswood, Mississippi
- Green Leaves, Mississippi
- Natchez National Historical Park, Mississippi

=== Missouri ===
- New Bourbon, Missouri
- Jacques Guibourd Historic House, Missouri
- Alfred W. Morrison House, Missouri
- Rice-Tremonti House, Missouri
- The Griot Museum of Black History, Missouri
- Newbill-McElhiney House, Missouri
- Shobe-Morrison House, Missouri

=== New Hampshire ===
- John Sullivan House, New Hampshire

=== New Jersey ===
- Oak Ridge Park in Clark, New Jersey (unconfirmed)

=== New York ===
- Bush-Lyon Homestead, New York
- Raynham Hall Museum, New York

=== North Carolina ===
- Horton Grove, only 2-story slave quarters in North Carolina
- Cascine (Louisburg, North Carolina)
- Bellamy Mansion, North Carolina
- Boyette Slave House, Kenly NC, NRHP-listed
- Bowen-Jordan Farm, North Carolina
- Tryon, North Carolina
- James Newsome House, North Carolina
- Poteat House, North Carolina
- Mills-Screven Plantation, North Carolina
- Somerset Place, North Carolina
- Stagville, North Carolina
- Midway Plantation House and Outbuildings, North Carolina
- Pettigrew State Park, North Carolina
- Brown–Graves House and Brown's Store, North Carolina
- Fairntosh Plantation, North Carolina
- Leigh Farm, North Carolina
- Grimesland Plantation, North Carolina
- Waddle–Click Farm, North Carolina
- Zebulon B. Vance Birthplace, North, Carolina

=== Pennsylvania ===
- President's House (Philadelphia)

=== South Carolina ===
- Point of Pines Plantation Slave Cabin, Edisto Island, SC, NRHP-listed
- Slave Houses, Gregg Plantation, Mars Bluff, South Carolina, NRHP-listed
- Annandale Plantation (Georgetown County, South Carolina)
- Fox House (Lexington, South Carolina)
- Oakwood (Gadsden, South Carolina)
- Old House Plantation, South Carolina
- Boone Hall, South Carolina
- Brookland Plantation, South Carolina
- Drayton Hall, South Carolina
- Miles Brewton House, South Carolina
- Laurelwood (Richland County, South Carolina)
- Hopsewee, HABS photos, South Carolina
- Magnolia (Bennettsville, South Carolina)
- Pee Dee River Rice Planters Historic District, South Carolina
- Goodwill Plantation, South Carolina
- Harrietta Plantation, South Carolina
- Herndon Terrace, South Carolina
- Hightower Hall, South Carolina
- Hobcaw Barony, South Carolina
- Keithfield Plantation, South Carolina
- List of plantations in South Carolina
- Mansfield Plantation, South Carolina
- McLeod Plantation, South Carolina
- Sams Plantation Complex Tabby Ruins, South Carolina
- Wicklow Hall Plantation, South Carolina
- Nathaniel Russell House, South Carolina
- Evins-Bivings House, South Carolina
- Frederick Nance House, South Carolina
- Nicholls-Crook House, South Carolina

=== Tennessee ===
- The Hermitage (Nashville, Tennessee)
- Owen-Primm House, Tennessee ... see Primm Farm slave cabins preservation here
- White Plains (Cookeville, Tennessee)
- Rock Castle (Hendersonville, Tennessee)
- Belle Meade Plantation, Tennessee
- Carnton, Tennessee
- Clover Bottom Mansion, Tennessee
- DeVault Tavern, Tennessee
- Edwards-Fowler House, Tennessee
- Ewing Farm, Tennessee
- Clifton Place (Columbia, Tennessee)
- Mabry Hood House, Tennessee
- L'Hermitage Slave Village Archeological Site, Tennessee
- Museum of Appalachia, Tennessee
- Rice-Marler House, Tennessee
- Maden Hall Farm, Tennessee
- Williams–Richards House, Tennessee
- Samuel Stacker House, non-contributing, Tennessee

=== Texas ===
- Washington-on-the-Brazos, Texas
- Sweeny, Texas

=== United States Virgin Islands ===
- 13 Wimmelskafts, St. Thomas, Virgin Islands, located in the Historic District of Charlotte Amalie

=== Virginia ===
- Arcola Slave Quarters, Arcola, Virginia, NRHP-listed
- Dover Slave Quarter Complex, Manakin-Sabot, VA, NRHP-listed
- Piedmont (Greenwood, Virginia)
- Highland (James Monroe house)
- Ionia (Trevilians, Virginia)
- Mannheim (Linville, Virginia)
- Meadow Grove Farm, Virginia
- Montpelier (Orange, Virginia)
- Mount Vernon, Virginia, see Quander family
- Green Hill (Long Island, Virginia)
- Berry Hill Plantation, Virginia
- Appomattox Court House National Historical Park ruins
- Ben Venue (Washington, Virginia)
- Black Walnut (Clover, Virginia)
- Bel Air (Woodbridge, Virginia)
- Ramsay (Greenwood, Virginia)
- Solitude (Blacksburg, Virginia)
- Stirling (Massaponax, Virginia)
- Westview (Brookneal, Virginia)
- Red Hill Patrick Henry National Memorial, Virginia
- Edge Hill (Gladstone, Virginia)
- Rose Hill Farm (Upperville, Virginia)
- Farnley (White Post, Virginia)
- Dewberry (Beaverdam, Virginia)
- Brickland ruins, Virginia
- Mountain Home (Front Royal, Virginia)
- Pharsalia (Tyro, Virginia)
- Sunnyside (Washington, Virginia)
- Waveland (Marshall, Virginia)
- Thomas Jefferson Foundation
- Loretto (Wytheville, Virginia)
- Martin's Hundred, virginia
- Monticello
- Oakley Farm (Virginia)
- Clark Royster House, Clarksville, Virginia
- Edmondson Hall, Virginia
- St. Julien (Spotsylvania County, Virginia)
- McLean House (Appomattox, Virginia)
- Monocacy National Battlefield
- Long Branch Plantation, Virginia
- Effingham (Aden, Virginia)
- Westend (Trevilians, Virginia), HABS pics
- The Cove (Harrisburg, Virginia)
- Estouteville (Esmont, Virginia)
- Tuckahoe (plantation), Virginia
- Rose Hill (Front Royal, Virginia)
- Keswick (Powhatan, Virginia) circular Virginia
- Locust Hill (Mechanicsville, Virginia)
- Spring Hill (Ivy, Virginia)
- The Farm (Rocky Mount, Virginia)
- Arlington House, The Robert E. Lee Memorial
- Annefield (Boyce, Virginia)
- Carter's Grove, Virginia
- Fudge House, Virginia
- Poplar Forest, Virginia
- Sweet Briar College, Virginia
- Patrick Robert Sydnor Log Cabin, Virginia
- Clover Hill Tavern, Virginia
- Glennmary, Virginia
- Thomas Jefferson and slavery
- Buffalo Forge, Virginia
- Black Meadow, Virginia
- Long Glade Farm, Virginia
- Collins Ferry Historic District, Virginia
- Mount Bernard Complex, Virginia
- Chatham Manor, Virginia
- Smithfield Farm, Virginia
- Prestwould, Virginia
- Howard's Neck Plantation, Virginia
- Ben Lomond Plantation, Virginia
- Rockbridge Alum Springs Historic District, Virginia
- Mount Fair, Virginia
- Cyrus McCormick Farm, Virginia
- Farmer's Rest, Virginia
- Woodlawn Historic and Archeological District, Virginia
- Glendale Farm, Virginia
- Blandy Experimental Farm Historic District, Virginia

=== Washington, D.C. ===
- Decatur House, Washington, D.C.
- The Octagon House, Washington, D.C.
- Belmont-Paul Women's Equality National Monument, Washington, D.C.

=== West Virginia ===
- Edgewood (Bunker Hill, West Virginia)
- Hedges–Robinson–Myers House, Hedgesville, West Virginia
- Teter Myers French House, West Virginia
- William Wilson House (Gerrardstown, West Virginia)
- Altona (West Virginia)
- Maidstone Manor Farm, West Virginia
- Carter Farm, West Virginia
- John Drinker House, West Virginia

== Items with relevant info to capture ==
- Antebellum architecture
- Booker T. Washington National Monument, Virginia
- Charles H. Fairbanks
- Josiah Henson
- Plantation complexes in the Southern United States
- Plantations in the American South
- James Innes Thornton

== Other slave-related buildings ==
- Bremo Slave Chapel, Bremo Bluff, VA, NRHP-listed
- Bruin's Slave Jail, Alexandria, VA, NRHP-listed
- Old Slave Mart, Charleston, SC, NRHP-listed
- Mason County, Kentucky slave pen
- Various slave forts in Africa

== See also ==
- List of African-American historic places in Georgia
