= Catsburg =

Catsburg may refer to:

- Nicky Catsburg (born 1988), Dutch racing driver
- Catsburg Store, a historic building in Durham County, North Carolina, US
