= Catsburg Store =

Coordinates: 36.0490°N 78.8729°W

The Catsburg Country Store was located at the junction of Old Oxford Highway and Hamlin Road in Durham County, North Carolina, sited roughly halfway between Durham and Butner, near historic Stagville Plantation.

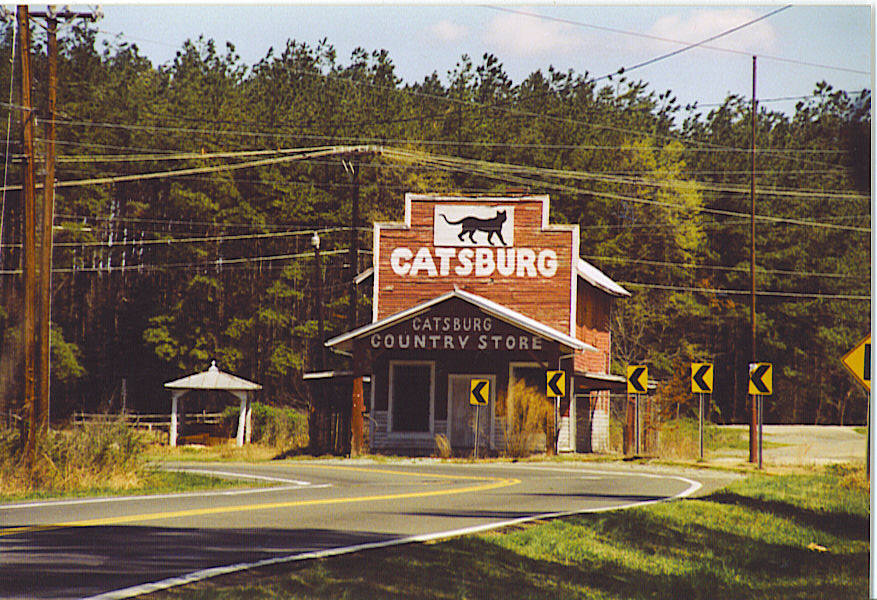
The abandoned Catsburg Store, c. 2003

This two-story, hip-roofed, frame structure was a well-preserved box-and-canopy store that survived until it was dismantled for preservation and relocation in 2020. Built in the 1920s by Sheriff Eugene G. Belvin, it had a high false front, and a one-story gable-roof supported by large wooden posts.

After the location closed for business and was abandoned in the 1990's, the Catsburg Country Store was still widely recognized as a local landmark. Its renown came from the large painted image of a black cat on the front parapet above the word Catsburg, which led to the building becoming a favorite of local photographers and artists. This part of town is called Catsburg as a tribute to the late Sheriff Belvin, whose nickname was "Cat." Belvin was an extremely popular sheriff in Durham County who earned his nickname through his ability to sneak up on bootleggers and moonshiners in the 1920s. Little to nothing is known of "Cat" but some say that his knack for finding local stills had much to do with his being a distiller himself and "wiping out the competition".

Surrounding the old store, Catsburg Natural Area contains a Basic Mesic Forest with two rare plant species. The site was a Registered Heritage Area owned in part by the Army Corps of Engineers; the remainder is privately owned.

The disassembly of the structure by Preservation Durham was completed in 2020 after a widely publicized search for a new caretaker for the building, which had been offered for free to anyone who would move it. As of 2022, the original location now serves as a makeshift parking area for tractor trailers and an illegal dumping ground.

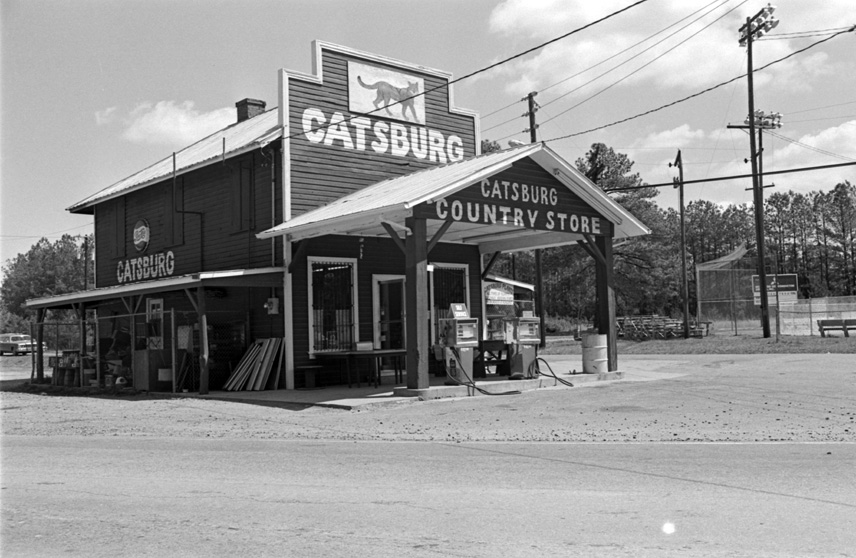
Catsburg Store, 04.07.87 (Courtesy The Herald-Sun Newspaper)
