= Pharsalia (Tyro, Virginia) =

Historic house in Virginia, United States

- U.S. National Register of Historic Places
- Virginia Landmarks Register
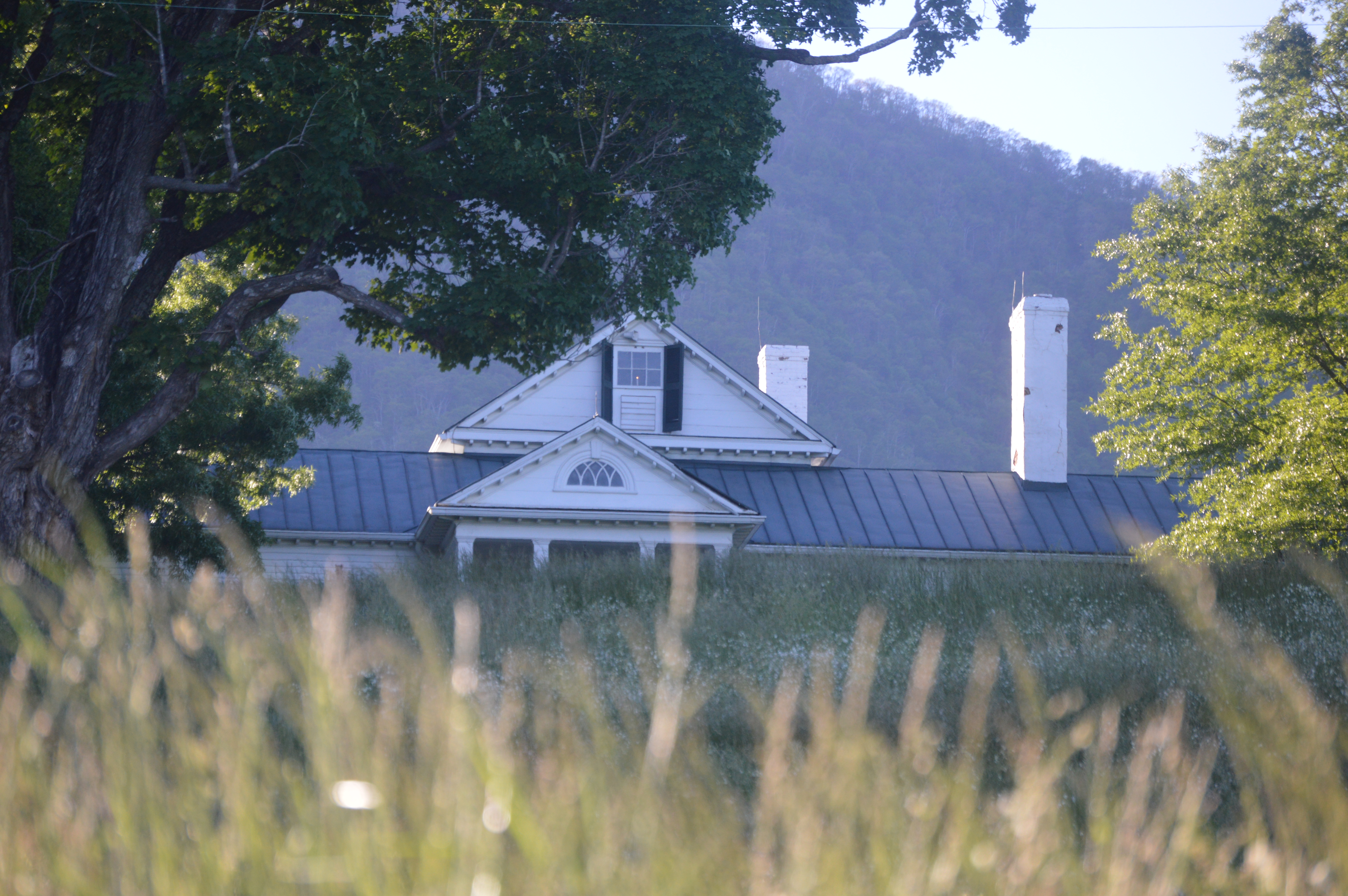
- Front of the house

- Location within Virginia Location within the United States
- Location: 2325 Pharsalia Rd., Tyro, Virginia
- Coordinates: 37°48′07″N 79°01′23″W
- Area: 23.5 acres (9.5 ha)
- Built: c. 1814-1816, c. 1834
- Built by: Thomas Massie, et al.
- Architectural style: Federal
- NRHP reference No.: 09000395
- VLR No.: 062-0428

Significant dates
- Added to NRHP: June 3, 2009
- Designated VLR: March 19, 2009

Pharsalia is a historic plantation house and farm complex located near Tyro, Nelson County, Virginia. The main house was built between 1814 and 1816 using slave labor, and is a one-story, 11 bay, linear, single-pile, Federal style, frame manor house. It has a standing seam metal gable roof and features a three-bay porch with a gable roof. It was enlarged in the mid-19th century to its current T-shaped plan. Also on the property are the contributing kitchen / laundry / slave hospital (1834), icehouse / School (c. 1834), crib barn (c. 1830), smokehouse (1814), weaving Room (c. 1814), several slave quarters (c. 1814, 1834), and privy (c. 1814). Also on the property are the sites of a commercial smokehouse (c. 1830) and mill (c. 1830).

It was listed on the National Register of Historic Places in 2009.

== Slavery ==
The property was ordered constructed by American planter and Revolutionary War veteran Thomas Massie as a wedding present for his son William Massie (1795-1862) and his first wife, Sarah Steptoe (1796-1828). At the height of ownership, William owned close to 200 enslaved African-Americans who lived in twenty-five slave quartering buildings on the property. At William's death, there were 154 enslaved people living at Pharsalia who then fell into possession of his fourth wife, Maria Catherine Effinger (1814-1889), and his children. William began slave record keeping in 1815 after being gifted his first twenty-one slaves from his father and an additional amount from his first father-in-law, James Steptoe.

Those enslaved at Pharsalia produced wheat, oats, hemp, tobacco, potatoes, bacon, whiskey, wool, apples, and other crops, and raised animals for the Massie family. William was also a prominent slave barterer, breeder, and seller in addition to owner, keeping meticulous records on those enslaved at Pharsalia and the crops they produced, and occasionally would detail their lives including their deaths and if they were sold and why in his "Negro Book." Over the course of his ownership of Pharsalia, William maintained numerous bills of sale for enslaved men, women, and children, many of whom were related and were thus separated from their family members upon sale.

Women and girls who were enslaved at Pharsalia were forced to have children as young as fourteen years old and would be forced to continue to have children for up to thirty years after; giving birth every one to two years. The higher the rates of survival for their births, the longer they were used by the Massie family for breeding.

In 1859, three years before his death, William Massie recorded that he had 62 enslaved people working in the fields who earned him an average of $81.41 yearly each—an amount totaling $5,047.42 or the equivalent of $181,226.70 as of 2023.

== Civil War ==
During the American Civil War, Pharsalia was opened to Confederate troops for quartering and feeding by William's widow, Maria Effinger, who provided Confederate soldiers in the region food and shelter. Maria also contracted enslaved people at the Pharsalia plantation for laboring and impressment on Confederate fortifications, for horse maintenance and goods production during the war.
