= Nicholls-Crook House =

Historic house in South Carolina, United States

- U.S. National Register of Historic Places
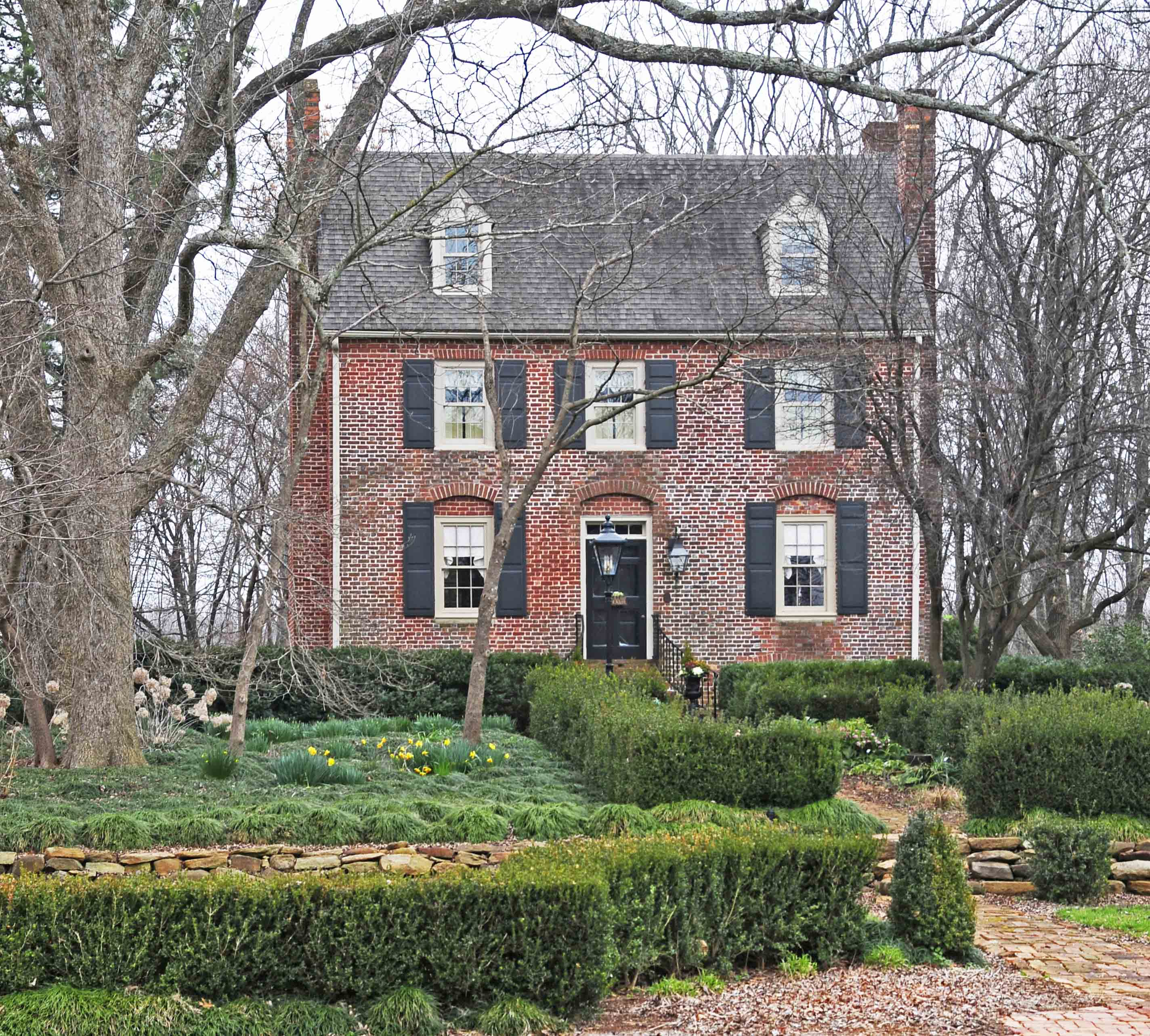
- Nicholls-Crook House, February 2012

- Location within South Carolina Location within the United States
- Location: 15 miles southwest of Spartanburg off U.S. Route 221, near Spartanburg, South Carolina
- Coordinates: 34°46′57″N 82°1′22″W
- Area: 2.5 acres (1.0 ha)
- Built: c. 1800
- Architectural style: Georgian
- NRHP reference No.: 73001731
- Added to NRHP: March 20, 1973

Nicholls-Crook House is a historic home located near Spartanburg, Spartanburg County, South Carolina. It was built about 1800, and is a 2 1/2-story, three-bay, brick Georgian style dwelling. The interior features large fireplaces, an original hand-carved mantel, and a full basement, that was used as domestic slave quarters.

It was listed on the National Register of Historic Places in 1973.
