= Samuel Stacker House =

- U.S. National Register of Historic Places
- Location within Tennessee Location within the United States
- Location: Long Branch Rd., near Dover, Tennessee
- Coordinates: 36°27′39″N 87°47′42″W
- Area: 25 acres (10 ha)
- Built: 1856
- Architectural style: Greek Revival
- MPS: Iron Industry on the Western Highland Rim 1790s--1920s MPS
- NRHP reference No.: 88000257
- Added to NRHP: April 11, 1988

The Samuel Stacker House, near Dover, Tennessee, is a historic Greek Revival-style house built in 1856. It was listed on the National Register of Historic Places in 1988. The listing included five contributing buildings and one contributing object.

It includes a limestone, hipped roof-springhouse.

Log slave quarters, which had been moved and were in deteriorated condition, were deemed non-contributing.
