= Kimbrough-Hehr House =

- U.S. National Register of Historic Places
- Location within Kentucky Location within the United States
- Location: U.S. 62, Broadwell, Kentucky
- Coordinates: 38°19′39″N 84°21′48″W
- Area: 6 acres (2.4 ha)
- Built: c.1840, c.1820
- Built by: Broadwell, Asbury; Kimbrough, John
- Architectural style: Greek Revival
- NRHP reference No.: 79000992
- Added to NRHP: April 20, 1979

The Kimbrough-Hehr House, on U.S. 62 in Broadwell, Kentucky, was built around 1840. It was listed on the National Register of Historic Places in 1979. The listing included five contributing buildings.

The house is a two-story five-bay Greek Revival-style brick house, joined by a roofed open passageway to a two-story building which originally served as a kitchen with servant quarters above. Nearby are a one-story slave quarters and a smokehouse. The historic Broadwell Store, built c.1820, is also on the property.
