= DeVault Tavern =

- U.S. National Register of Historic Places
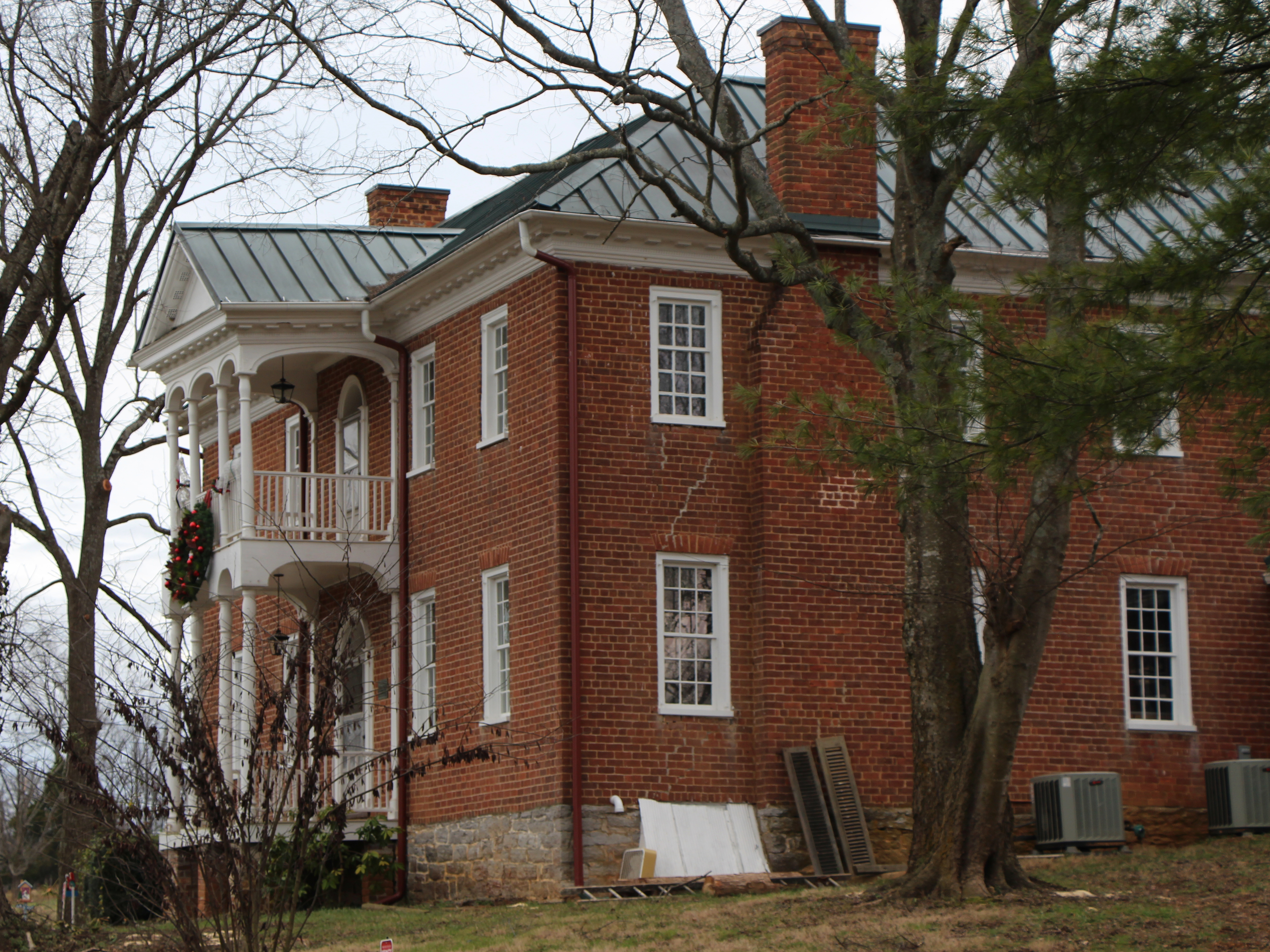

- Location within Tennessee Location within the United States
- Nearest city: Jonesboro, Tennessee
- Coordinates: 36°17′33″N 82°32′32″W
- Area: 9 acres (3.6 ha)
- Built: 1821
- Architectural style: Federal
- NRHP reference No.: 73001855
- Added to NRHP: June 4, 1973

Built in 1821, DeVault Tavern is a two-story brick building in the federal style in Washington County, Tennessee, near Jonesborough. There is a lower and upper front porch made of wood construction with a small pediment. A two-story ell extends to the rear and some enclosure has been made on the side porch of the ell. The brick is Flemish bond and the house rests on a limestone foundation. The windows are original, as are the shutters. Detail under the eaves and around the porch is hand-carved and gives the appearance of a honeycomb; this detail is found in several early houses in Washington County. The original brick spring house is just across the road from the DeVault Tavern covered in vine and broken down. This structure stands on the Great Stage Road between Abingdon, Virginia, and Knoxville, Tennessee. Andrew Jackson stayed at the tavern, as did General John Hunt Morgan of the Confederate Army on the night before his death. The home left the family due to greed and a false Will with a forged signature.

It is now an animal sanctuary called ‘The Tilted Tavern Animal Sanctuary ’.
