= Sunnyside (Washington, Virginia) =

- U.S. National Register of Historic Places
- U.S. Historic district
- Virginia Landmarks Register
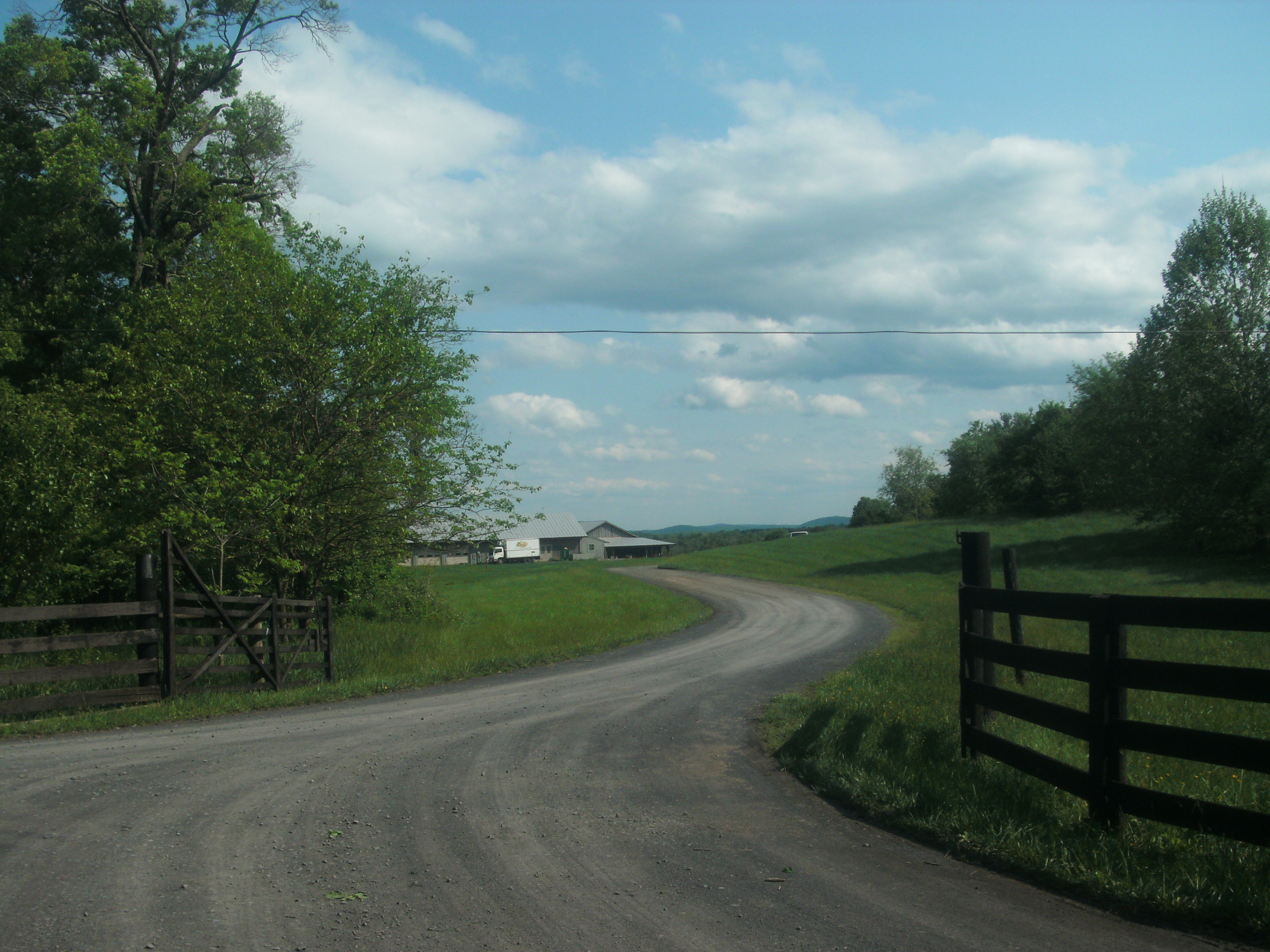
- Entrance to the farm complex seen in May, 2016

- Location within Virginia Location within the United States
- Location: 186 Sunnyside Orchard Ln., Washington, Virginia
- Coordinates: 38°44′34″N 78°09′43″W
- Area: 421.9 acres (170.7 ha)
- Built: 1785
- Architectural style: Log House
- NRHP reference No.: 04001274
- VLR No.: 078-0049

Significant dates
- Added to NRHP: November 27, 2004
- Designated VLR: September 8, 2004

Sunnyside, also known as Sunnyside Farms, is a historic farm complex and national historic district located at Washington, Rappahannock County, Virginia. It encompasses 13 contributing buildings, 3 contributing sites, and 2 contributing structures. The main house was constructed in four distinct building phases from about 1785 to 1996. The oldest section is a two-story single-pile log structure with a hall-parlor plan, with a 1 1/2-story stone kitchen added about 1800. In addition to the main house, the remaining contributing resources include five dwellings (one of which is a stone slave quarters), two smokehouses, a root cellar, a chicken coop, a spring house, two cemeteries, a silo, a workshop, a stone foundation for a demolished house, stone walls, and a shed. The farm is the location of the first commercial apple orchard in Rappahannock County, Virginia, established in 1873.

It was added to the National Register of Historic Places in 2004.
