= Evan Hall =

Historic house in Louisiana, United States

- Evan Hall Slave Cabins
- U.S. National Register of Historic Places
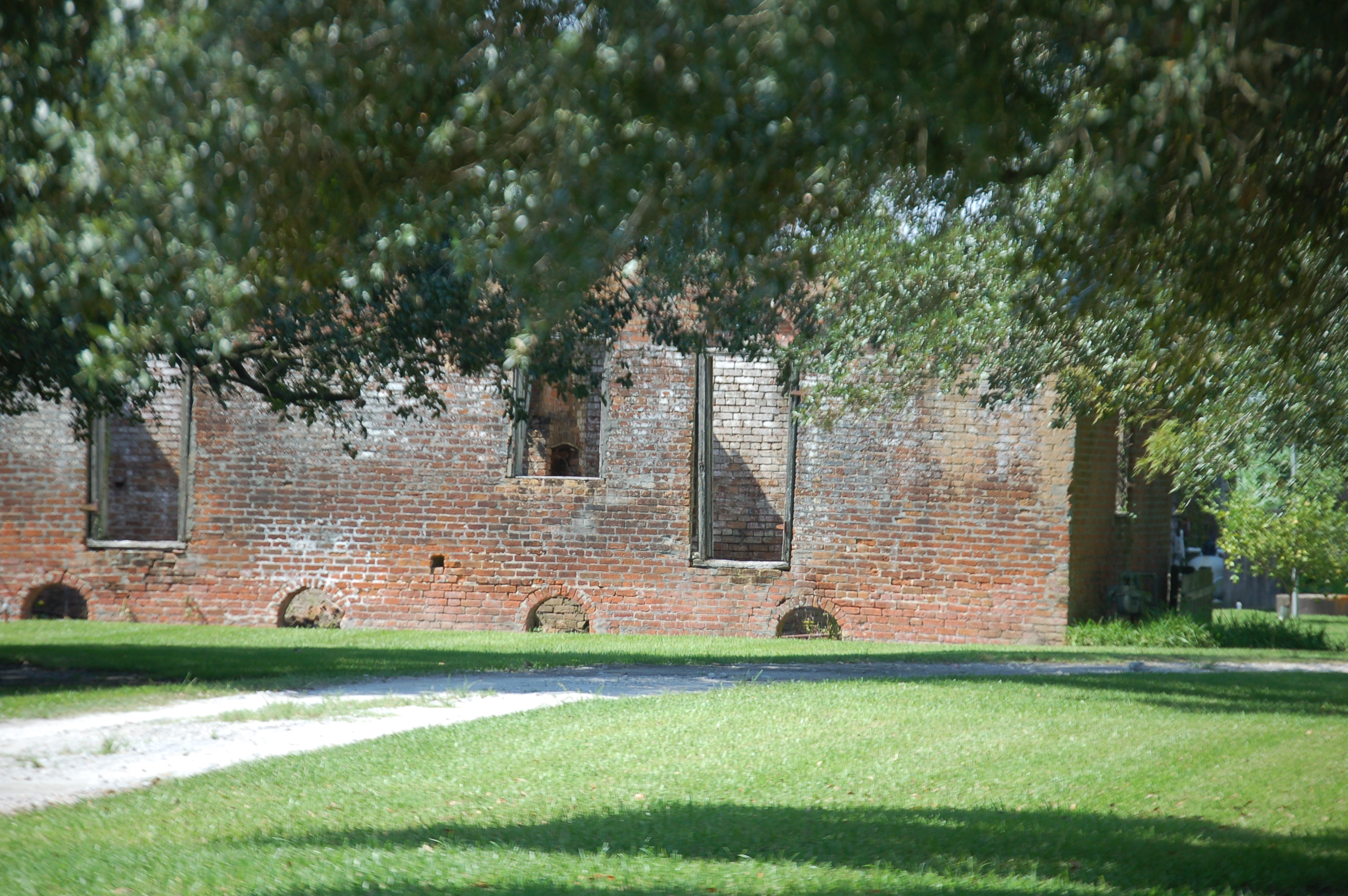
- The remaining slave cabin in 2012

- Location within Louisiana
- Location: Along Louisiana Highway 405, about 150 yards (140 m) northeast of intersection with Louisiana Highway 1
- Nearest city: Donaldsonville
- Coordinates: 30°07′05″N 91°02′41″W
- Area: 2 acres (0.81 ha)
- Built: 1840
- NRHP reference No.: 83000484
- Added to NRHP: September 20, 1983

Evan Hall is a former sugarcane plantation in Donaldsonville, Louisiana, U.S. It was established for the production of sugar by Evan Jones, a merchant and politician, by 1807.

It was later acquired by Henry McCall, a planter from New Orleans, who built a mansion and slave cabins in 1840; McCall owned another plantation in Lafourche Parish, Louisiana.

The remaining two slave cabins have been listed on the National Register of Historic Places since September 20, 1983. Sometime after the listing the northeastern cabin seems to have been demolished or incorporated into a modern building. (Note: Compare sketch map and pictures with modern satellite imagery.)

== See also ==
- National Register of Historic Places listings in Ascension Parish, Louisiana
