= Owen-Primm House =

Historic house in Tennessee, United States

- U.S. National Register of Historic Places
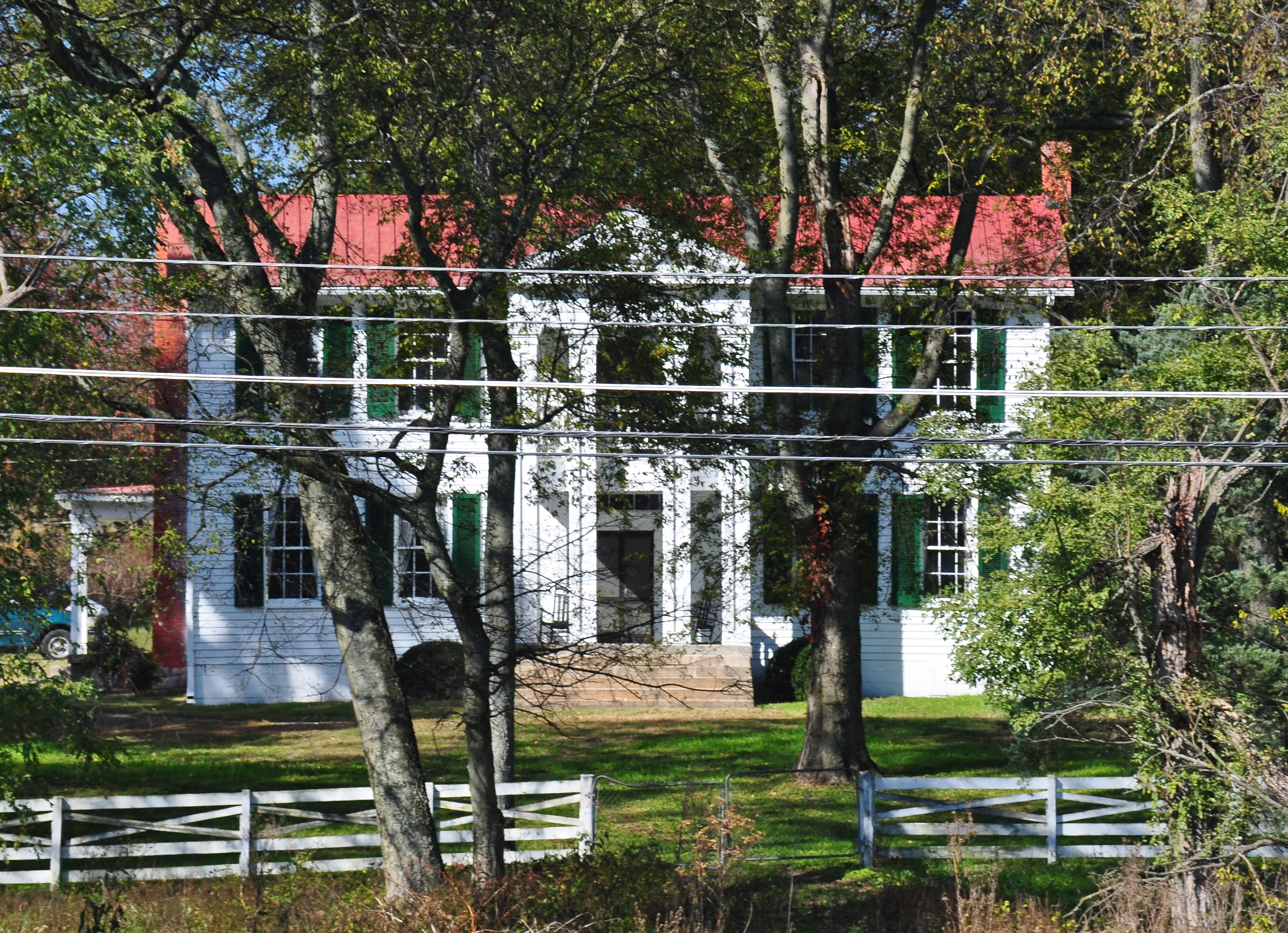
- Owen-Primm House, October 2014.

- Location within Tennessee Location within the United States
- Location: Moores Ln. at Wilson Pike, Brentwood, Tennessee
- Coordinates: 35°58′1″N 86°46′46″W
- Area: 1.8 acres (0.73 ha)
- Built: c. 1806, c. 1845 and c. 1900
- Architectural style: Greek Revival, Central passage plan
- MPS: Williamson County MRA
- NRHP reference No.: 88000328
- Added to NRHP: April 13, 1988

The Owen-Primm House was originally a log cabin built by Jabez Owen c. 1806, and later expanded with wood framing by Thomas Perkins Primm c. 1845. This property in Brentwood, Tennessee was listed on the National Register of Historic Places in 1988.

Dr. Jabez Owen was a prominent physician and planter in Brentwood who owned hundreds of acres around Moores Lane, Wilson Pike, and Concord Road. Dr. Owen was one of the wealthiest men in Williamson County, and at his death in 1850 he owned 58 slaves. Some of these antebellum slave cabins still stand on the property today.

It was built or has other significance in c.1806, c.1845, and c.1900. It includes Central passage plan and other architecture.

When listed the property included four contributing buildings and two contributing structures on an area of 1.8 acres (0.73 ha).

The outbuildings include a pair of c.1845 log slave cabins with a shared stone chimney, square notching and original vertical board doors; a c. 1920 stone springhouse, a frame barn with weatherboard siding from c.1920, a frame garage from c.1930; a frame shed from c.1930.

The property was covered in a 1988 study of Williamson County historical resources.

The Primm farm's former slave cabins were potentially to be preserved, but one plan failed in 2018.
