= Evins-Bivings House =

Historic house in South Carolina, United States

- U.S. National Register of Historic Places
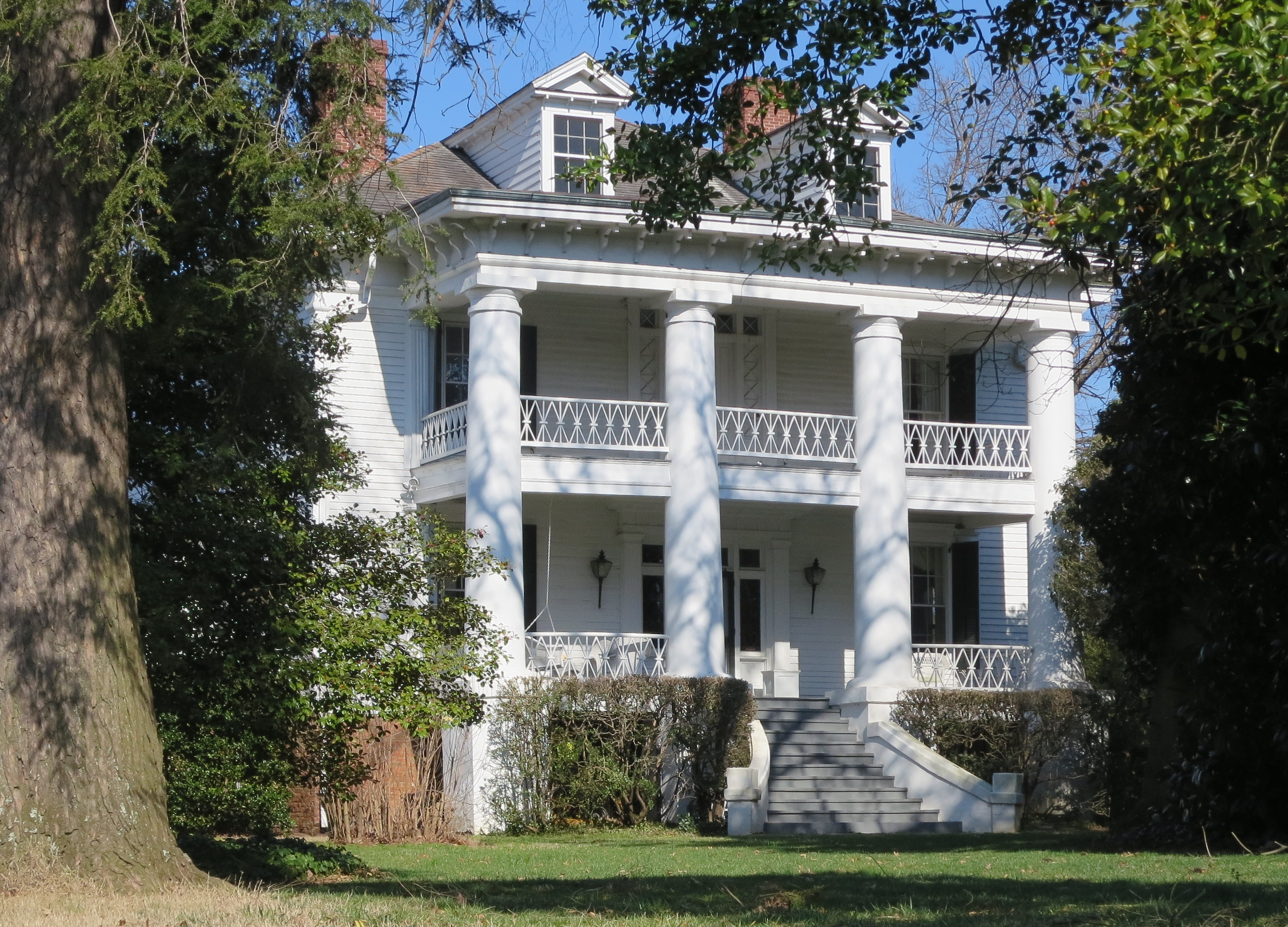
- Evins-Bivings House, February 2012

- Location within South Carolina Location within the United States
- Location: 563 N. Church St., Spartanburg, South Carolina
- Coordinates: 34°57′35″N 81°56′27″W
- Area: 3 acres (1.2 ha)
- Built: 1854
- Architectural style: Greek Revival
- NRHP reference No.: 70000601
- Added to NRHP: July 16, 1970

Evins-Bivings House, also known as the Dr. James Bivings House, is a historic home located at Spartanburg, Spartanburg County, South Carolina. It was built about 1854, and is a two-story, white clapboard house in the Greek Revival style. The house features double piazzas with massive Doric order columns and notable balustrades. Also on the property are the original kitchen, slave quarters, smokehouse, and well. It was built by Dr. James Bivings, who founded Glendale Mills.

It was listed on the National Register of Historic Places in 1970.
