= Stirling (Massaponax, Virginia) =

Historic house in Virginia, United States

- U.S. National Register of Historic Places
- Virginia Landmarks Register
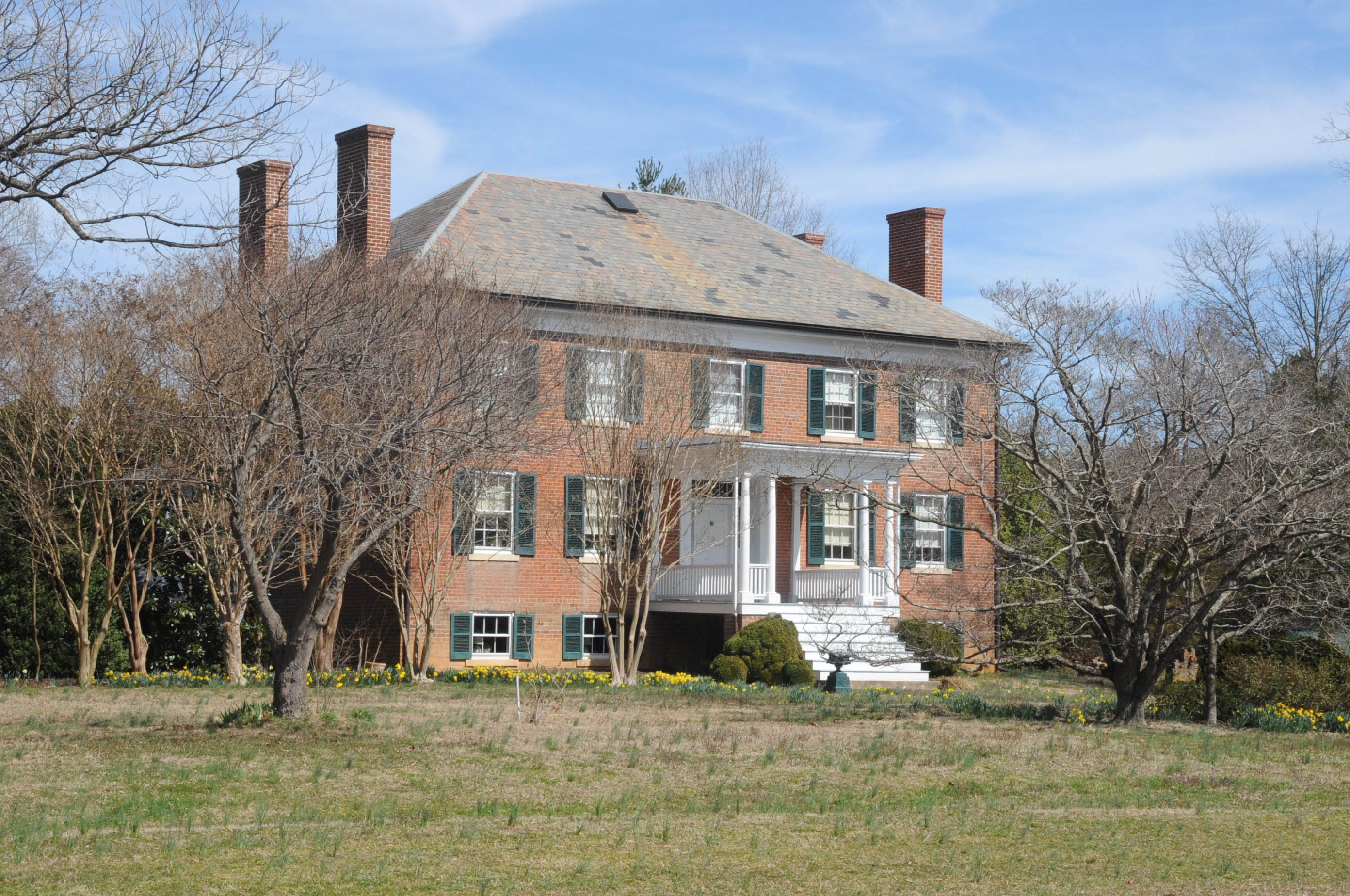

- Location within Northern Virginia Location within Virginia Location within the United States
- Location: County Route 607 at I-95, near Massaponax, Virginia
- Coordinates: 38°10′51″N 77°30′20″W
- Area: 13.8 acres (5.6 ha)
- Built: 1858-1860, 1912
- Built by: Holladay, John; Holladay, Tavener W.
- Architectural style: Greek Revival, Federal
- NRHP reference No.: 89000366
- VLR No.: 088-0066

Significant dates
- Added to NRHP: May 5, 1989
- Designated VLR: February 16, 1988

Stirling, also known as Stirling Plantation, is a historic plantation house located near Massaponax, Spotsylvania County, Virginia. It was built between 1858 and 1860, and is a 2 1/2-story, five-bay, brick Greek Revival and Federal dwelling. It measures 56 feet by 36 feet, and has a hipped roof and four interior end chimneys. It sits on a raised basement and features entrance porches added about 1912. Also on the property are the contributing kitchen dependency, smokehouse, family cemetery, and the undisturbed archaeological sites of a weaving house and three slave cabins.

It was listed on the National Register of Historic Places in 1989.
