= Susanna Farm =

Historic house in Maryland, United States

- U.S. National Register of Historic Places
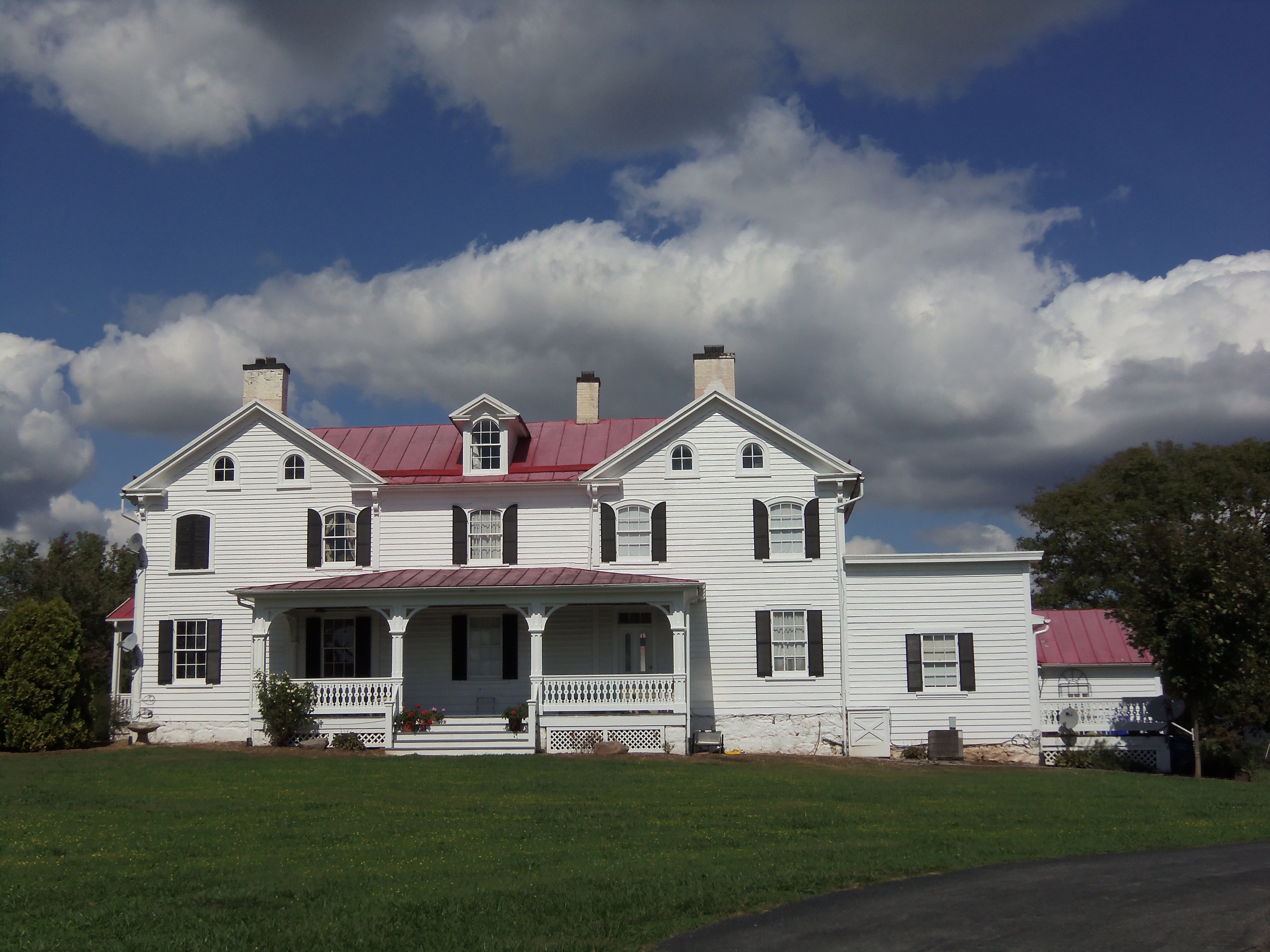
- Susanna Farm, September 2012

- Location within Maryland Location within the United States
- Location: 17700 White Grounds Rd., Dawsonville, Maryland
- Coordinates: 39°8′23″N 77°20′42″W
- Area: 11 acres (4.5 ha)
- Architectural style: Italianate, Federal
- NRHP reference No.: 83002958
- Added to NRHP: January 27, 1983

Susanna Farm is a historic home located at Dawsonville, Montgomery County, Maryland, United States. It is an L-shaped, 2 1/2-story frame dwelling house. The last major change occurred when the house was doubled in size and value by Benjamin F. Dyson in 1877–78, who renovated it in the Italianate style. Five outbuildings stand on the property, including a stone kitchen/slave quarters and meat house which are believed to be contemporary with the house, an 1870s frame bank barn, and 20th century farm buildings.

The Susanna Farm was listed on the National Register of Historic Places in 1983.
