= Boxwood Plantation Slave Quarter =

- U.S. National Register of Historic Places
- Alabama Register of Landmarks and Heritage
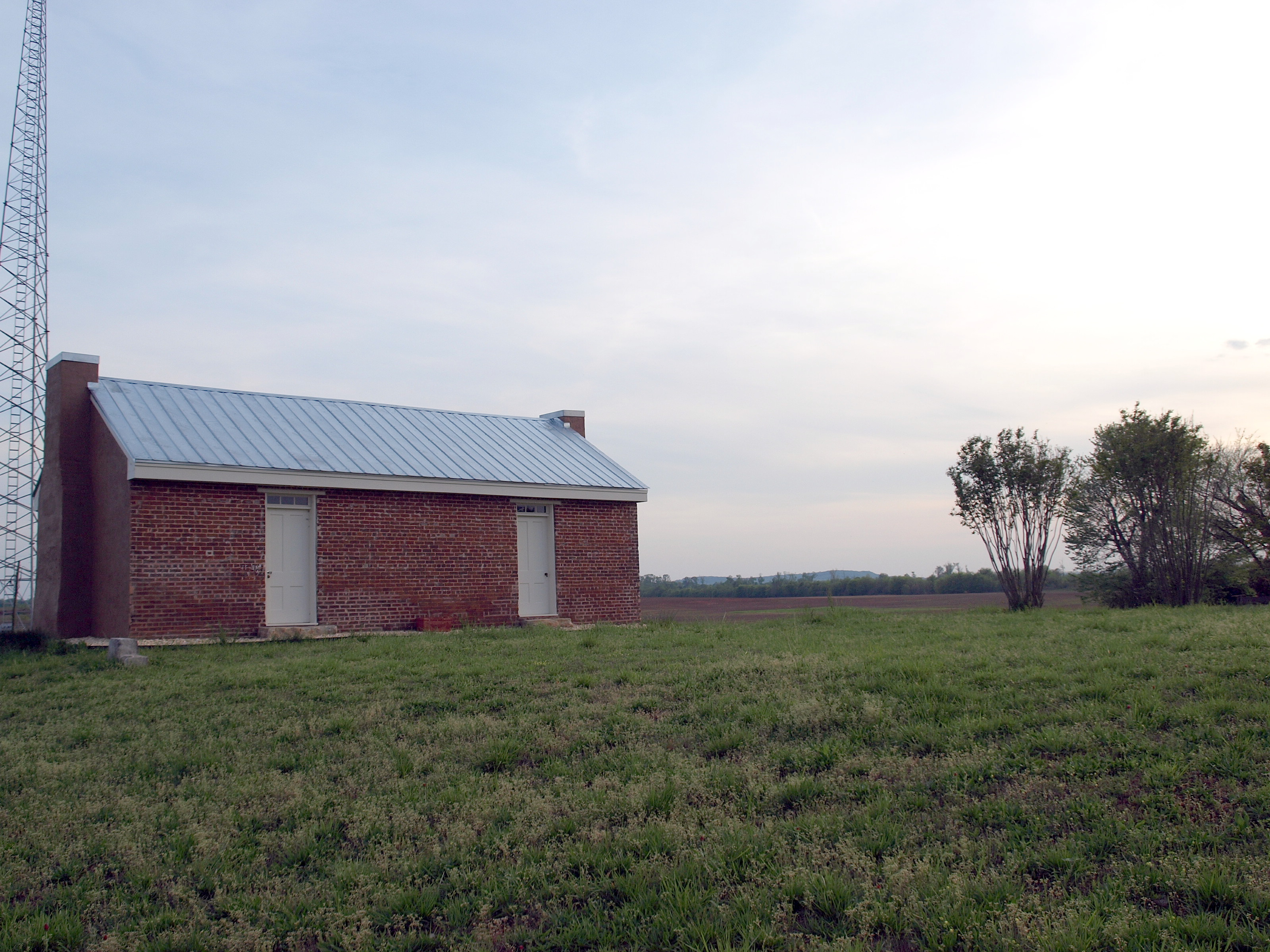
- The building in April 2017

- Location within Alabama Location within the United States
- Nearest city: Trinity, Alabama
- Coordinates: 34°38′2″N 87°6′49″W
- Architectural style: Double Pen
- NRHP reference No.: 13000470

Significant dates
- Added to NRHP: July 10, 2013
- Designated ARLH: August 25, 2011

The Boxwood Plantation Slave Quarter (also known as The Little Brick) is a historic building near Trinity, in Lawrence County, Alabama. The plantation was founded in late 1810s by Samuel Elliot, an Ulsterman who had originally settled in Middle Tennessee. Elliott and his son, Samuel Jr., built Boxwood into one of the largest plantations in the county, with $36,000 (equivalent to $1,022,000 in 2024) in real property and 92 slaves by 1860. Both the main plantation house and the slave quarters were built in the mid-1850s. Although the main house was demolished in the 1950s to make way for the widening of Highway 20, the slave quarter was remodeled and continued to serve as a house. The surrounding area continued to operate as a farm until 2010, when the land was purchased to construct an industrial park. The quarter is being preserved, and the later alterations have been removed, revealing the building's original form.

Unlike most contemporary plantations, Boxwood and its major dependencies were constructed of brick. The slave quarters are the only remnant of the several cotton plantations in northwest Morgan and northeast Lawrence counties, and one of only eight brick plantation quarters in Alabama. The double-pen building has two doors on the façade leading to separate rooms. Two windows on the rear of the house were converted to doors in the 1960s. A gable roof has chimneys in each end. The building was listed on the National Register of Historic Places in 2013 and the Alabama Register of Landmarks and Heritage in 2011.
