= St. Julien (Spotsylvania County, Virginia) =

Historic house in Virginia, United States

- U.S. National Register of Historic Places
- Virginia Landmarks Register
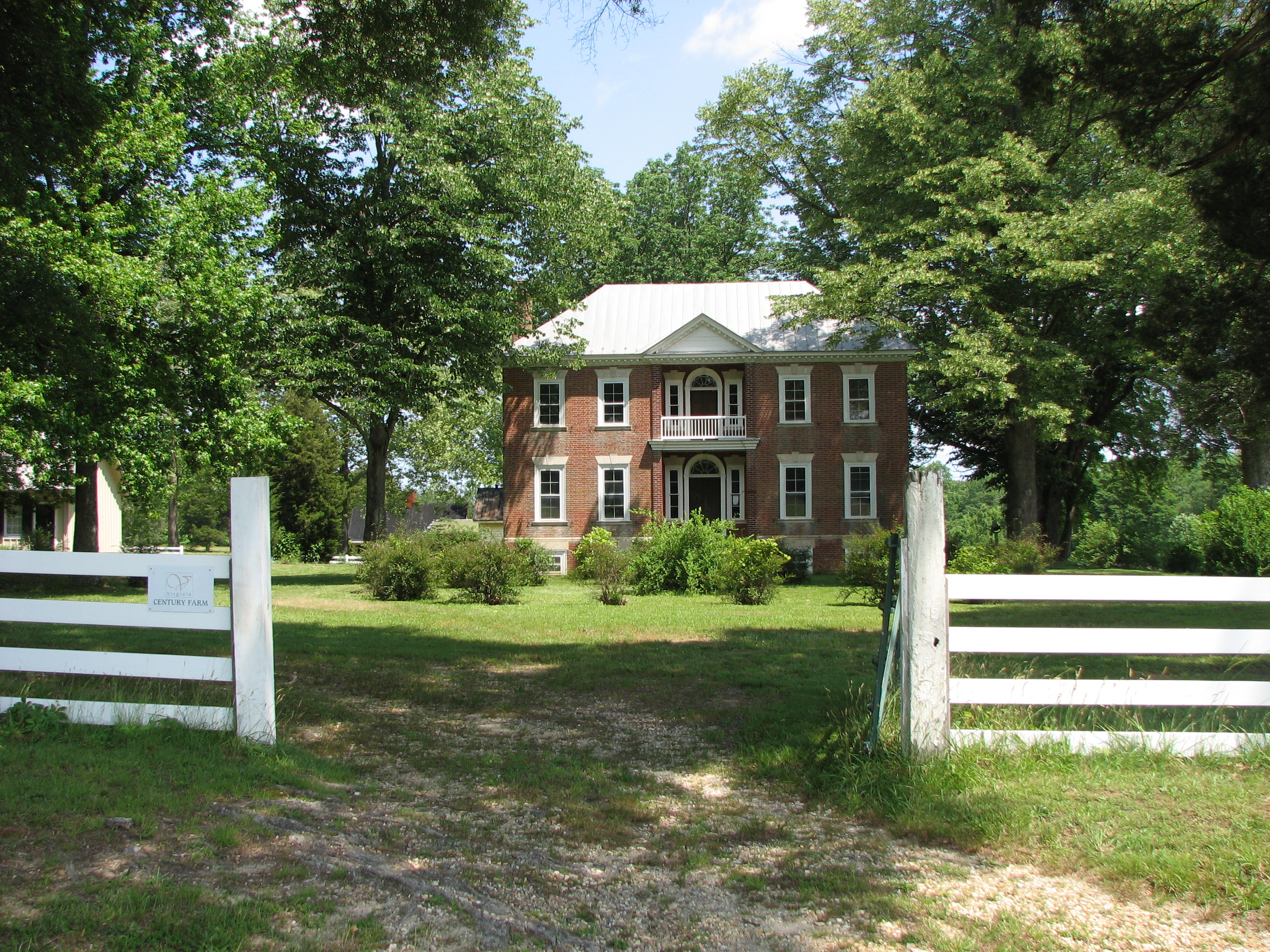
- St. Julien (1804), Spotsylvania County, Virginia

- Location within Northern Virginia Location within Virginia Location within the United States
- Location: South of Fredericksburg between VA 609 and VA 2, near Fredericksburg, Virginia
- Coordinates: 38°13′20″N 77°24′56″W
- Area: 338 acres (137 ha)
- Built: 1794; 1812
- Architectural style: Federal
- NRHP reference No.: 75002038
- VLR No.: 088-0061

Significant dates
- Added to NRHP: June 5, 1975
- Designated VLR: March 18, 1975

St. Julien is an historic plantation home located in Spotsylvania County, Virginia. The main house was built by Francis Taliaferro Brooke in 1794, with an addition added in 1812. There are several outbuildings that surround the main house. They include a slave quarters, smokehouse, milk house and law office used by Francis Brooke. Though relatively small in size, the home is exemplary of Federal architecture. The house was added to the National Register of Historic Places in June 1975

== Design ==
The house is a two-story, single-pile (only one room between the front and back of the building), Federal structure. St. Julien has a five-bay front. An unusual design element of the house is the in antis, or recessed portico at the summit of stone steps up to the front door. The most distinctive feature of St. Julien is its entrance bay. The balcony of the portico is faced with a smaller scale version of the modillion-and-fretwork cornice that encircles the house. A fanlight with wooden mullions. Above the front door, on the second floor, a door and sidelights mirror the portico's design. The house has a hip roof covered with sheet metal with interior end chimneys.

== History ==
St. Julien was the home of Francis Taliaferro Brooke (1763-1851), an important figure in early Virginia politics. Brooke was elected to the State Senate in 1800 and appointed a Judge of the General Court in 1804. Brook eventually became the President of the Supreme Court of Appeals in Virginia. Brook purchased 200 acres (81 ha) in Spotsylvania County in 1796 when he moved his practice and residence to Fredericksburg, Virginia. This tract became St. Julien.

Henry Clay was a frequent visitor to St. Julien. Brooke lived on the plantation from the time of the building of the house until his death there in 1851.
