= Waddle–Click Farm =

Historic farm in North Carolina, United States

- U.S. National Register of Historic Places
- Location within North Carolina Location within the United States
- Location: SR 2309, near Statesville, North Carolina
- Coordinates: 35°46′46″N 80°44′31″W
- Area: 20 acres (8.1 ha)
- Architectural style: Federal
- MPS: Iredell County MRA
- NRHP reference No.: 82003474
- Added to NRHP: June 24, 1982

Waddle–Click Farm is a historic home and farm complex located near Statesville, Iredell County, North Carolina. The Federal style house was built between about 1820 and 1835, and is a two-story, three bay by two bay, log dwelling. Also on the property are a contributing well house, smokehouse, log slave cabin, granary / corn crib, hay barn / stable, and a shed.

It was added to the National Register of Historic Places in 1982.
