= Locust Hill (Mechanicsville, Virginia) =

Historic house in Virginia, United States

- U.S. National Register of Historic Places
- Virginia Landmarks Register
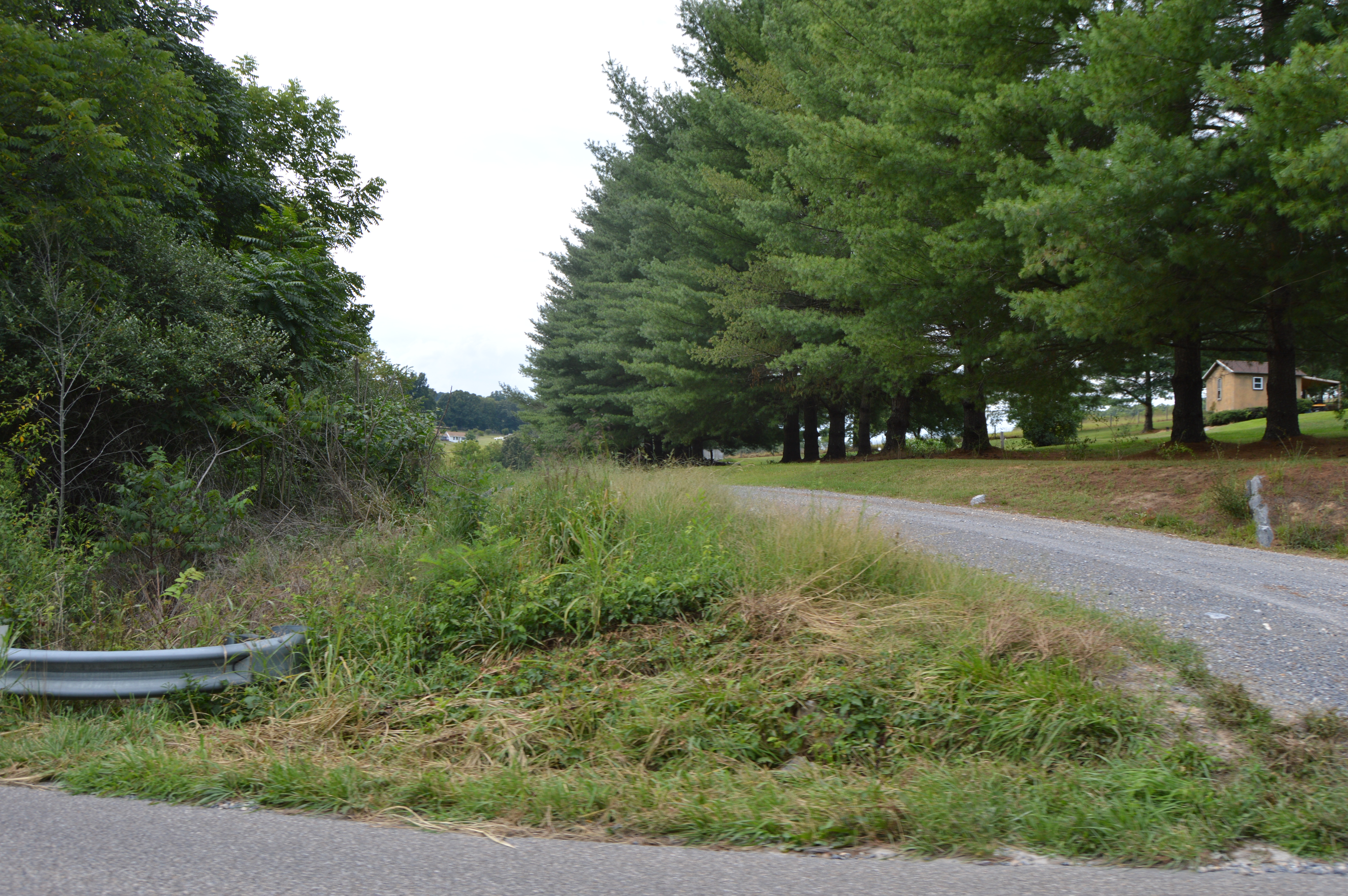
- Entrance to the property

- Location within Virginia Location within the United States
- Location: VA 608, near Mechanicsville, Virginia
- Coordinates: 37°43′55″N 79°24′5″W
- Area: 3.5 acres (1.4 ha)
- Built: 1826
- Architectural style: Federal
- NRHP reference No.: 86001066
- VLR No.: 081-0179

Significant dates
- Added to NRHP: May 12, 1986
- Designated VLR: October 15, 1985

Locust Hill is a historic home located near Mechanicsville in Rockbridge County, Virginia. The house was built in 1826, and is a two-story, three-bay, Federal-style brick dwelling. It has a side gable roof and interior end chimneys. The interior was damaged by fire in the 1850s and much of the woodwork was replaced with Greek Revival forms. A Greek Revival style front porch dates from the same period. The property also includes the contributing "slave quarters," a double pen log corn crib, and two frame sheds.

It was listed on the National Register of Historic Places in 1986.
