= Fudge House =

Historic house in Virginia, United States

- U.S. National Register of Historic Places
- Virginia Landmarks Register
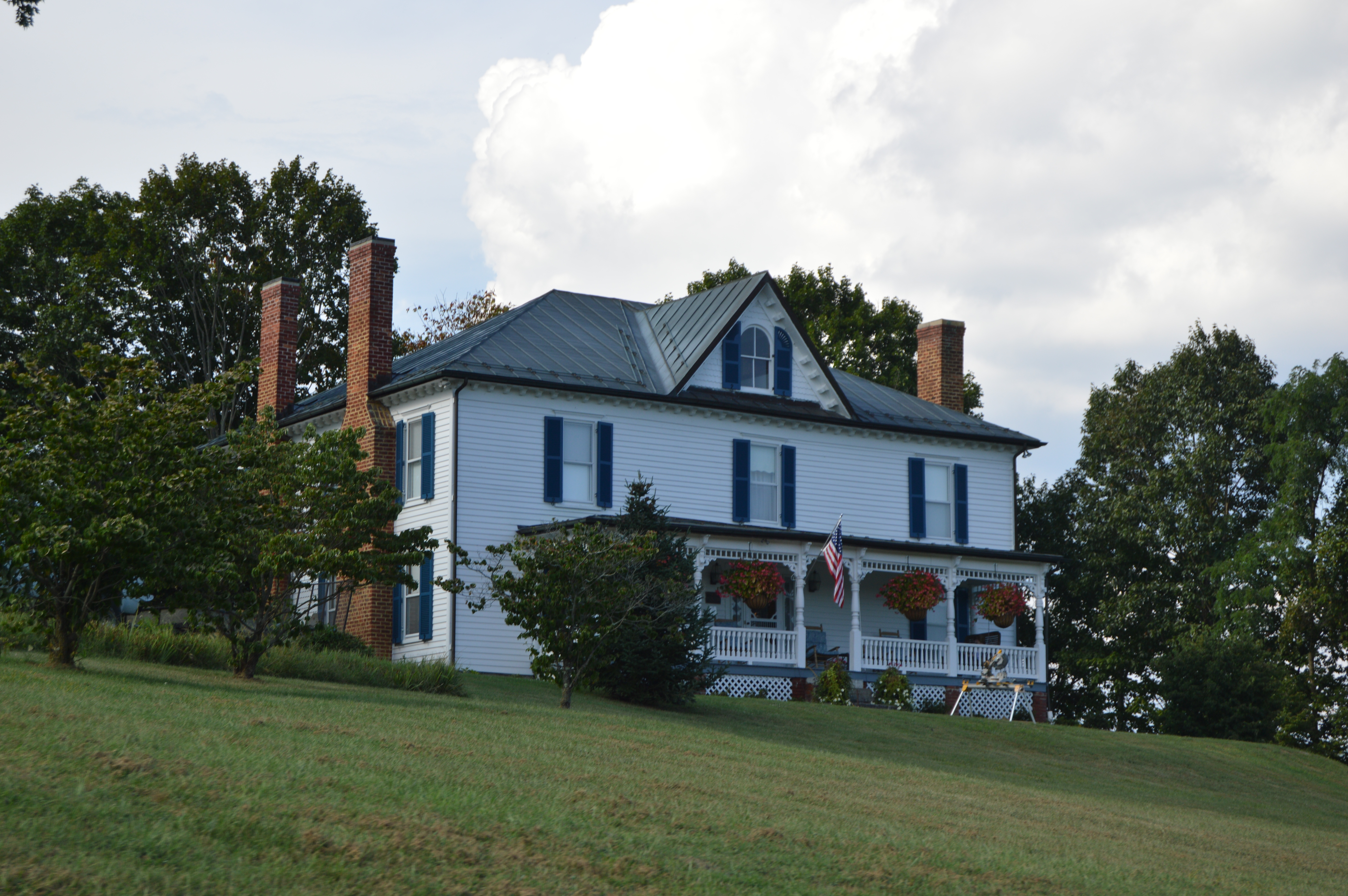
- Front of the house in 2016

- Location within Virginia Location within the United States
- Location: 620 Parklin Dr., Covington, Virginia
- Coordinates: 37°46′42.5″N 79°59′33″W
- Area: 4.6 acres (1.9 ha)
- Built: c. 1798, c. 1896, c. 1897, c. 1910
- Architectural style: Vernacular
- NRHP reference No.: 93000348
- VLR No.: 107-0023

Significant dates
- Added to NRHP: April 29, 1993
- Designated VLR: February 17, 1993

The Fudge House is a historic residence in the city of Covington, Virginia, United States. The earliest log section dates to about 1798, with additions and modifications made about 1826, 1897, and 1910. The resultant house is a two-story, weatherboarded structure of log, frame, and brick construction with a hipped roof, and four exterior chimneys. Also on the property is a contributing smokehouse and the ruins of a slave cabin and a third house.

It was added to the National Register of Historic Places in 1993.
