= Mount Fair =

Historic house in Virginia, United States

- U.S. National Register of Historic Places
- Virginia Landmarks Register
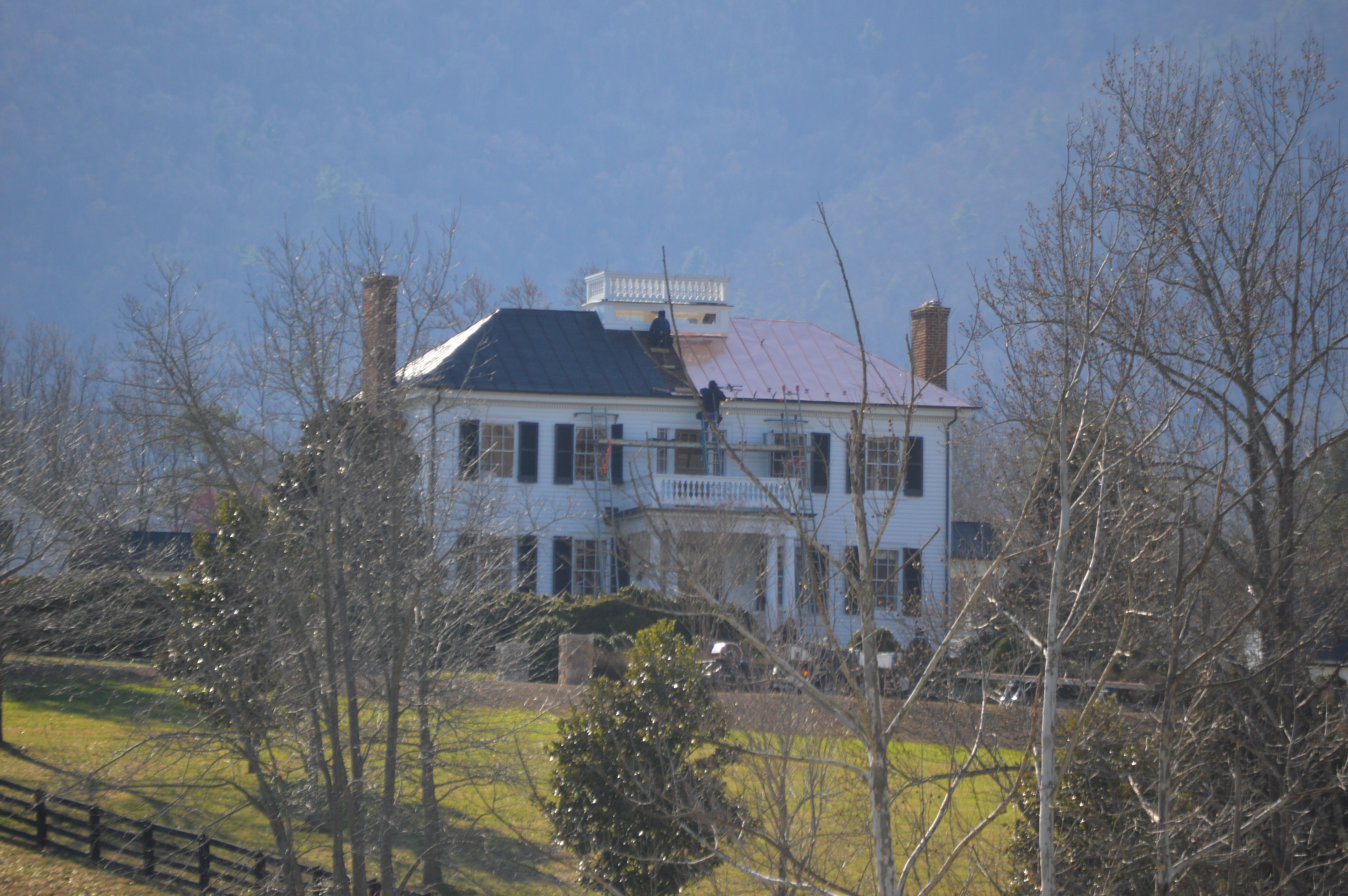
- Distant view from the east

- Location within Virginia Location within the United States
- Location: Junction of VA 673 and VA 810
- Coordinates: 38°09′55″N 78°40′39″W
- Area: 78.3 acres (31.7 ha)
- Architectural style: Greek Revival
- NRHP reference No.: 90001997
- VLR No.: 002-0097

Significant dates
- Added to NRHP: December 28, 1990
- Designated VLR: August 21, 1990

Mount Fair is a historic home and farm complex located in Albemarle County, Virginia. The main house was built about 1848, and is a 2 1/2-story, five-bay, frame building with Greek Revival style details. It has a hipped roof with widow's walk and a one-story, one-bay porch with a flat roof supported by Doric order columns. Also on the property are a contributing detached kitchen, a greenhouse, and two contributing structures, an icehouse and a spring house. The tract also has three contributing sites: the ruins of slave quarters, a slave cemetery, and a family cemetery.

It was added to the National Register of Historic Places in 1990.
