= Horton Grove =

Historic house in North Carolina, United States

- Horton Grove Complex
- U.S. National Register of Historic Places
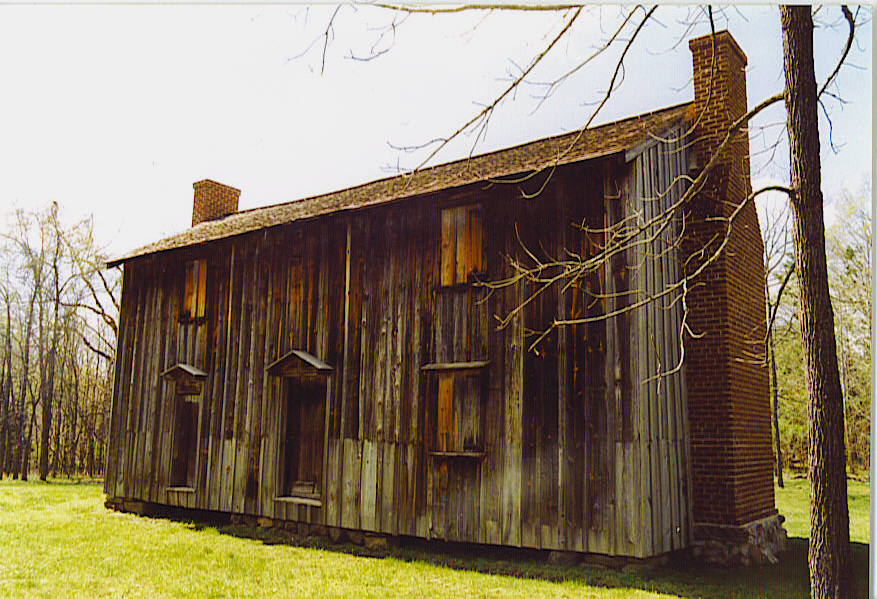
- Slave quarters at Horton Grove

- Location within North Carolina Location within the United States
- Location: North of Durham on SR 1626, nearDurham, North Carolina
- Coordinates: 36°7′35″N 78°50′22″W
- Area: 3.5 acres (1.4 ha)
- Built: 1850
- NRHP reference No.: 78001946
- Added to NRHP: March 17, 1978

Horton Grove was an area of houses for enslaved African-Americans at the 30,000-acre (120 km^{2}) Bennehan-Cameron plantation complex, which included Stagville Plantation in the northeastern part of Durham County, North Carolina. The slaves who lived at Horton Grove were held by the influential Bennehan and Cameron families. In 1860, 900 total slaves were held on the complex. The several structures still standing at Horton Grove are the only two-story slave residences remaining in North Carolina.

The quarters at Horton Grove, which were constructed by slave craftsmen in the early 1850s, were the culmination of decades of gradual improvements at the plantation complex. The dwellings at Horton Grove represented the pinnacle of slave house development and include shuttered windows, multiple stories, brick chimneys, and raised stone foundations.

These structures were occupied continuously until as late as the 1970s. After the American Civil War, many of the former slaves stayed on the property as sharecroppers and continued to live in these dwellings. Because of its historic and architectural significance, Horton Grove was listed in 1978 on the National Register of Historic Places. Archaeological finds on the site have provided insight into continuing practices of African heritage at Stagville, including the presence of divining rods and communal cooking practices.
