= Friendship Valley Farm =

Historic house in Maryland, United States

- U.S. National Register of Historic Places
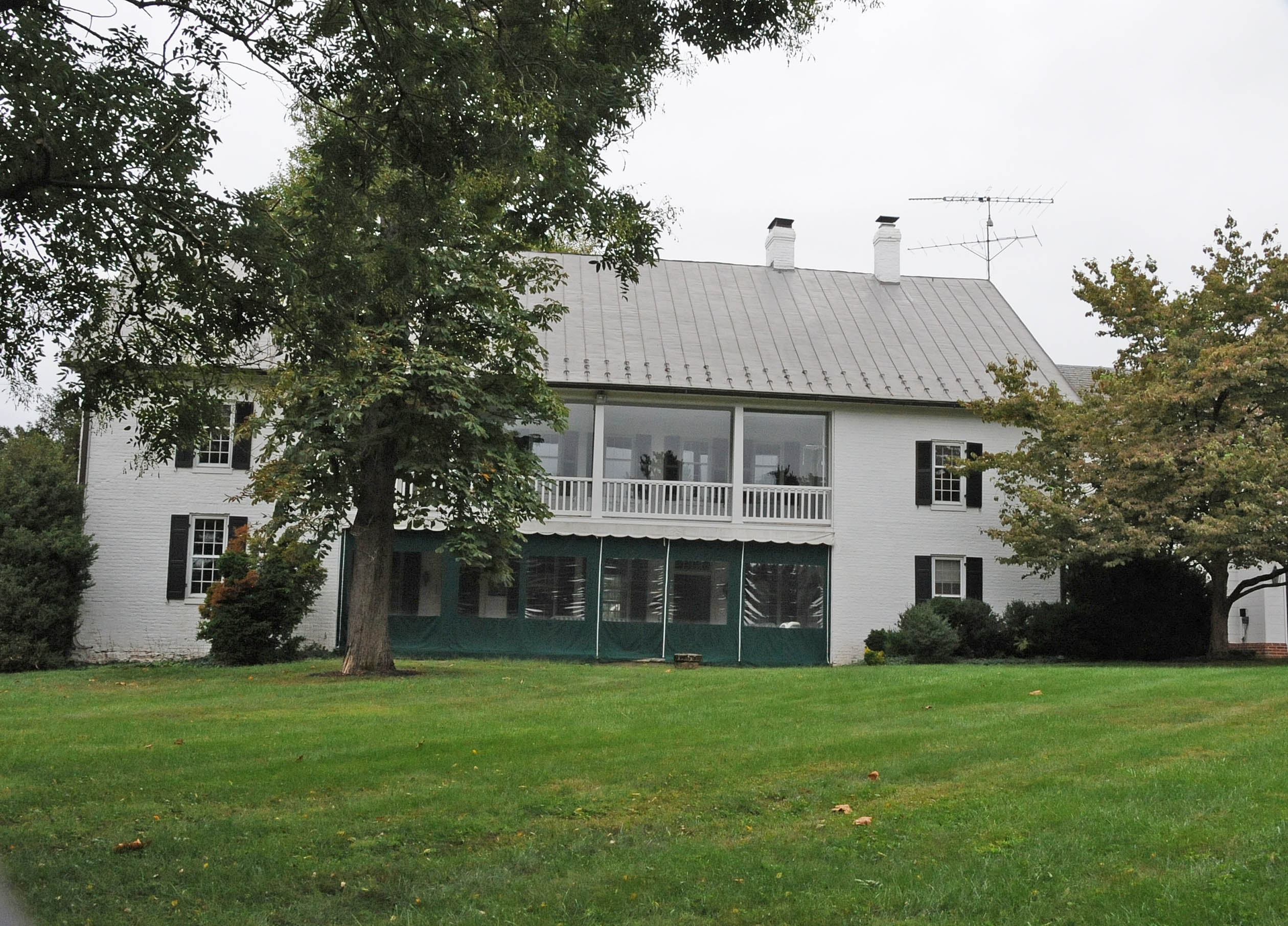

- Location within Maryland Location within the United States
- Location: 950 Gist Road, Westminster, Maryland
- Coordinates: 39°32′49″N 77°0′4″W
- Area: 5 acres (2.0 ha)
- Built: 1865
- NRHP reference No.: 77000688
- Added to NRHP: September 16, 1977

Friendship Valley Farm is a historic home and farm complex located at Westminster, Carroll County, Maryland, United States. It was established in the late 18th century. About that time a 2 1/2-story T-shaped main house was built of brick on a stone foundation. It was later expanded to its current "H" shape. One of the small log cabins still standing near the house was once a slave cabin. It was later used as a smoke house. Also on the property is a large brick wash-house and summer kitchen built in 1860, with a bell tower on the roof.

Friendship Valley Farm was listed on the National Register of Historic Places in 1977.
