= Hedges–Robinson–Myers House =

Historic house in West Virginia, United States

- U.S. National Register of Historic Places
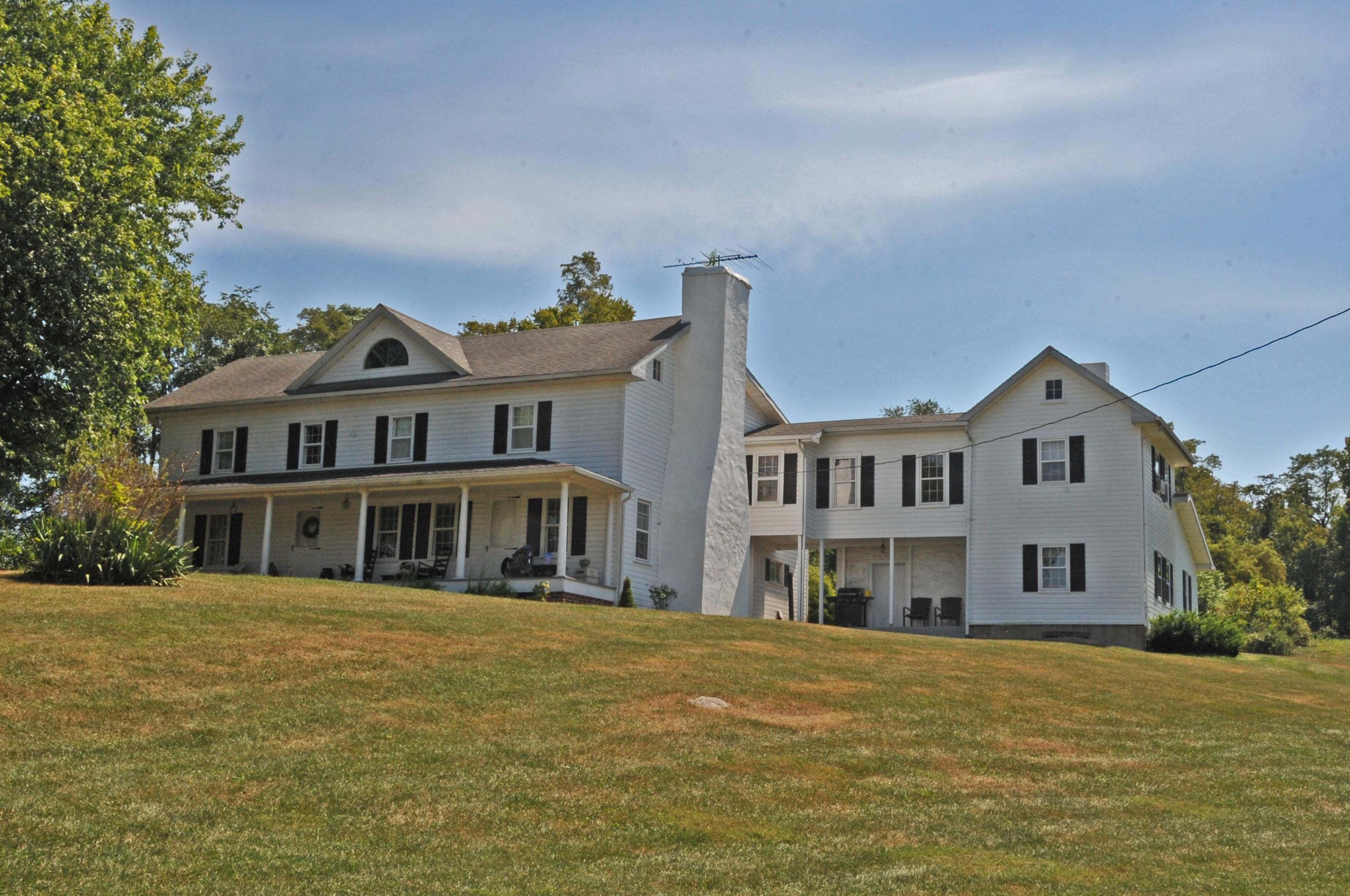

- Location within West Virginia Location within the United States
- Location: Route 3, near Hedgesville, West Virginia
- Coordinates: 39°33′27″N 77°58′27″W
- Area: 3 acres (1.2 ha)
- Built: 1880
- Architectural style: Gothic
- MPS: Berkeley County MRA
- NRHP reference No.: 80004418
- Added to NRHP: December 10, 1980

Hedges–Robinson–Myers House is a historic home and farm complex located near Hedgesville, Berkeley County, West Virginia. The main section of the house is a two-story, four-bay, gable roofed section with weatherboard added about 1880 in the Gothic Revival style. The western section of the log house was built about 1750. Also on the property is a bank barn (1850), ice house, stone smokehouse, slave quarters, corn crib, and spring and dairy house.

It was listed on the National Register of Historic Places in 1994.
