= Westover (Milledgeville, Georgia) =

Historic house in Georgia, United States

- U.S. National Register of Historic Places
- U.S. Historic district
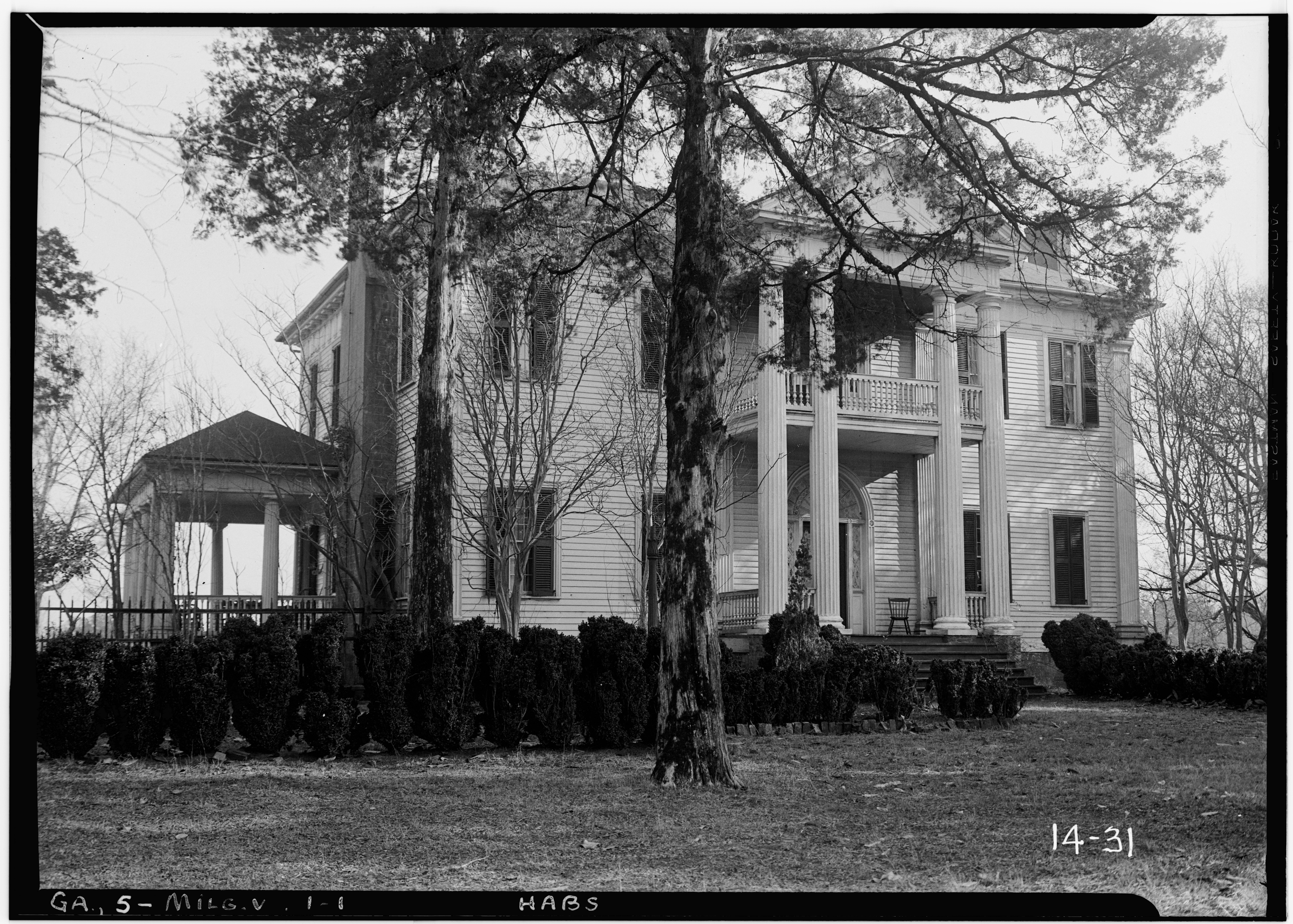

- Location within Georgia Location within the United States
- Nearest city: Milledgeville, Georgia
- Area: 40.4 acres (16.3 ha)
- Built: 1822
- NRHP reference No.: 87000094
- Added to NRHP: February 12, 1987

Westover is a historic Southern plantation in Milledgeville, Georgia, United States.

== History ==
The plantation was established in 1822 by Benjamin S. Jordan. Jordan built the great house, several outbuildings (including a smoke house and slave cabins), and laid out a formal garden. After his death in 1856, the plantation was inherited by his son, Leonidas A. Jordan.

The plantation was purchased by Dr. L. C. Lindsley, a Professor of Chemistry at Georgia College, in 1930. The great house burned down after being struck by lightning in 1954. The current home was built in its place.

The plantation includes outbuildings and a slave cemetery.
