= Stagville =

Historic house in North Carolina, United States

- U.S. National Register of Historic Places
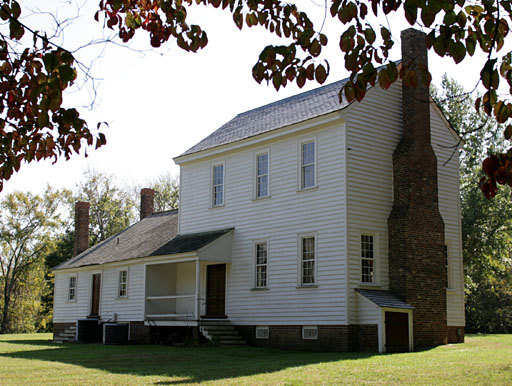

- Location within North Carolina Location within the United States
- Location: 5828 Old Oxford Highway, Durham, North Carolina
- Coordinates: 36°7′1″N 78°50′1″W
- Area: 9 acres (3.6 ha)
- Built: 1799
- Architectural style: Georgian
- NRHP reference No.: 73001338
- Added to NRHP: May 25, 1973

Stagville Plantation is located in Durham County, North Carolina. With buildings constructed from the late 18th century to the mid-19th century, Stagville was part of one of the largest plantation complexes in the American South. The entire complex was owned by the Bennehan, Mantack and Cameron families; it comprised roughly 30,000 acres (120 km^{2}) and was home to almost 900 enslaved African Americans in 1860.

The remains of Historic Stagville consist of 71 acres (290,000 m^{2}), in three tracts, and provides a unique look at North Carolina's history and general infrastructure in the antebellum South. Among structures on the Stagville site are several historic houses and barns, including the original Bennehan House and some of the original slave quarters, which were in an area known as Horton Grove.

The Bennehan House, built 1787 with a large addition in 1799, was listed on the National Register of Historic Places in 1973; Horton Grove, an area of two-story slave residences built in 1850, was listed in 1978. The slave residences are well preserved and are the only two-story slave quarters remaining in North Carolina. Significant archaeological finds around the quarters have given archaeologists and historians a glimpse into the lives of the many enslaved people who lived and worked at Stagville and throughout the Bennehan-Cameron holdings.

In 1976, Liggett and Meyers Tobacco Company, which had owned and worked the land for decades, donated some of the acreage to the state of North Carolina, which now operates the property as Historic Stagville State Historic Site, a historic house museum, which belongs to the North Carolina Department of Natural and Cultural Resources.
