= Delila, Virginia =

Unincorporated community in Virginia, United States

- Unincorporated community
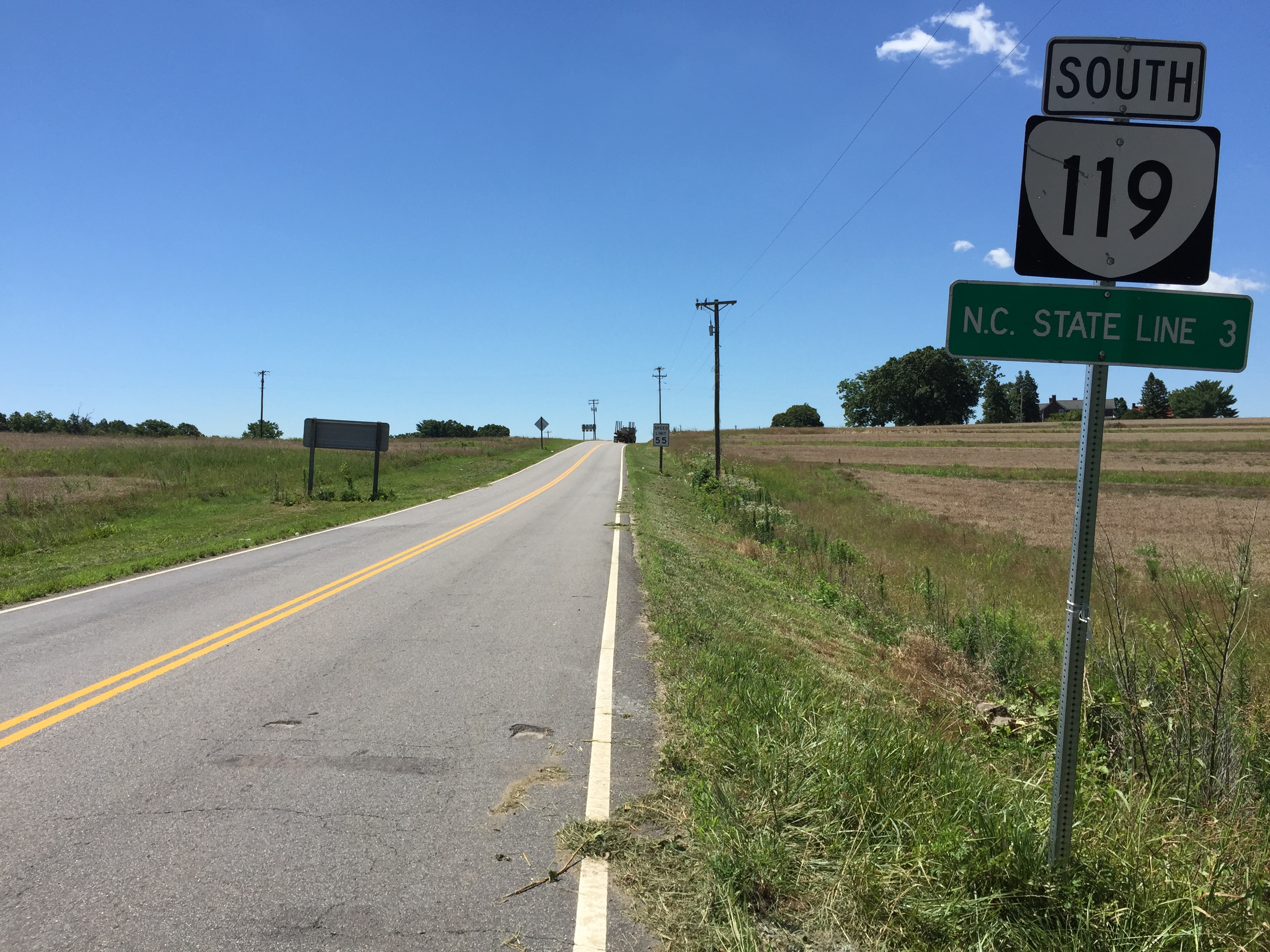
- View south along Highway 119 (Calvary Road) at US 58 / US 360 (Philpott Road)

- Location within the Commonwealth of Virginia Delila, Virginia (the United States)
- Coordinates: 36.5845°N 79.1405°W
- Country: United States
- State: Virginia
- County: Halifax
- Elevation: 506 ft (154 m)
- Time zone: UTC−5 (Eastern (EST))
  - Summer (DST): UTC−4 (EDT)
- ZIP code: 24520
- Area code: 434
- GNIS feature ID: 1477255

Delila is a rural unincorporated community in the southwest corner of Halifax County in the U.S. state of Virginia, located on US 360 / US 58 (Philpott Highway) at its intersection with SR 119 (Calvary Road) and SR 694 (Medley Road). Delila is 3 miles north of the North Carolina state line, 1 mile east of the Dan River, and roughly halfway between Danville and South Boston, Virginia. The nearest volunteer fire department to Delila is in Turbeville, approximately 7 miles (11 km) northeast of Delila.

== History ==
The source of the town's name is obscure. Delila was among the tens of thousands of rural communities across the country given their own "fourth-class" post offices in the mid- to late 1800s; it was officially listed as a post village by 1877. Samuel S. Brandon, whose family owned the adjoining estate now called Brandon-on-the-Dan, was postmaster of Delila in the late 1800s, running the mail facility out of his store, a common practice at the time. Delila continued to be noted as a "post-hamlet" in gazetteers at least as late as the 1920s, although the reference may have been dated – thousands of small rural post offices were closed in the early 1900s after the advent of rural free delivery, many of them within just a few years of opening. The Delila area is now served by the post office at Alton, Virginia (ZIP code 24520), 9 miles (14 km) east.

== Historic structures ==
The Greater Brandon Chapel Missionary Baptist Church is a historic African American congregation whose building is located 1.5 miles southwest of Delila on SR 767 (Brandon Chapel Road) off Highway 119.

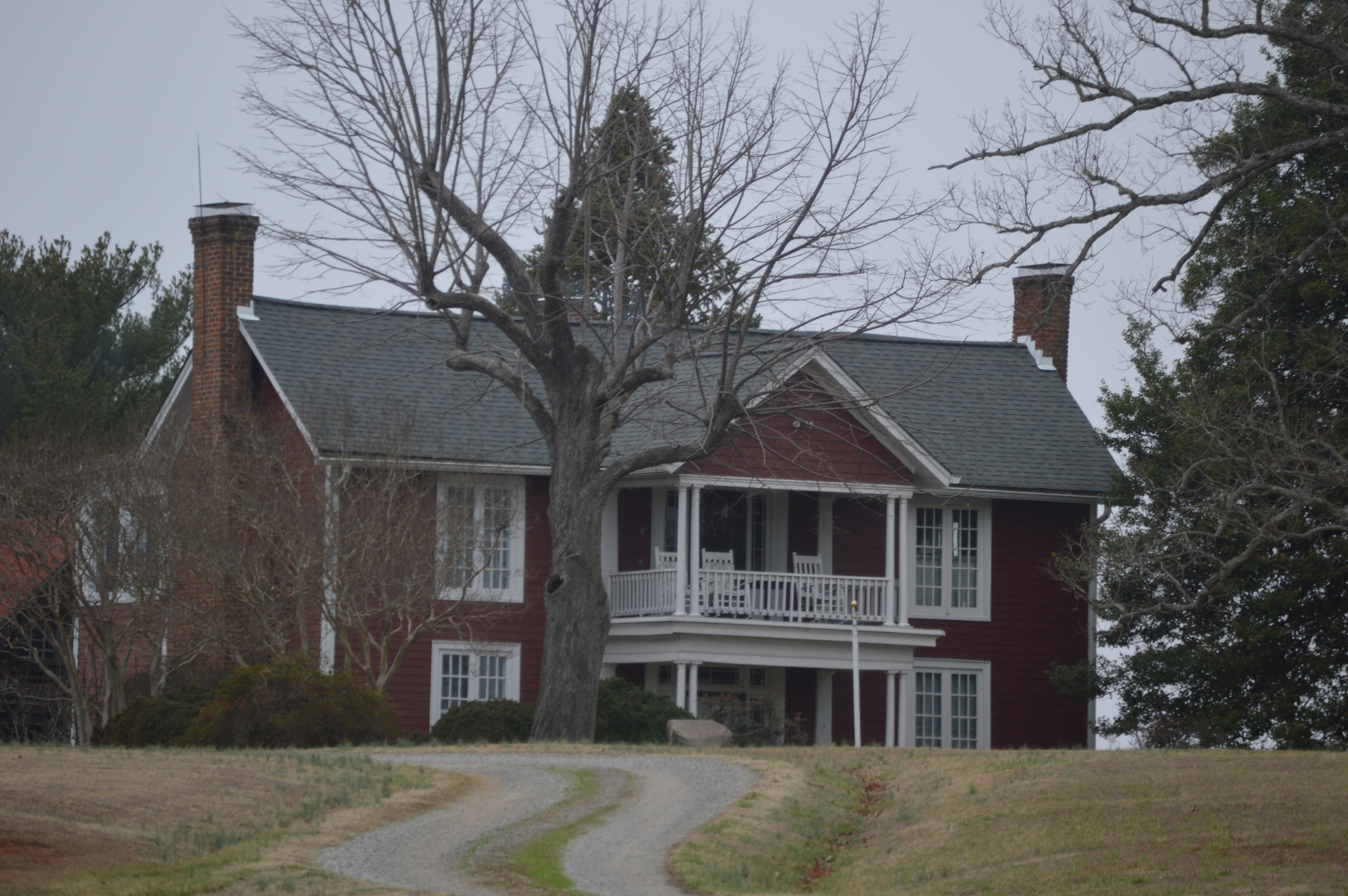
Brandon-on-the-Dan, Delila, VA

Sites near Delila that are listed on the National Register of Historic Places include:

- Brandon Plantation, a plantation home approximately 2 miles east.
- Brandon-on-the-Dan, an estate (owned by a different branch of the same family) whose buildings are located 0.4 miles south of Delila just off Highway 119.

Both of these properties are also on the Virginia Department of Historic Resources list of historic African American sites in Virginia.

== Points of interest ==
- Virginia International Raceway is located approximately 7 miles (by road) southwest of Delila.
