= Brandon Plantation (Halifax County, Virginia) =

Historic house in Virginia, United States

- U.S. National Register of Historic Places
- Virginia Landmarks Register
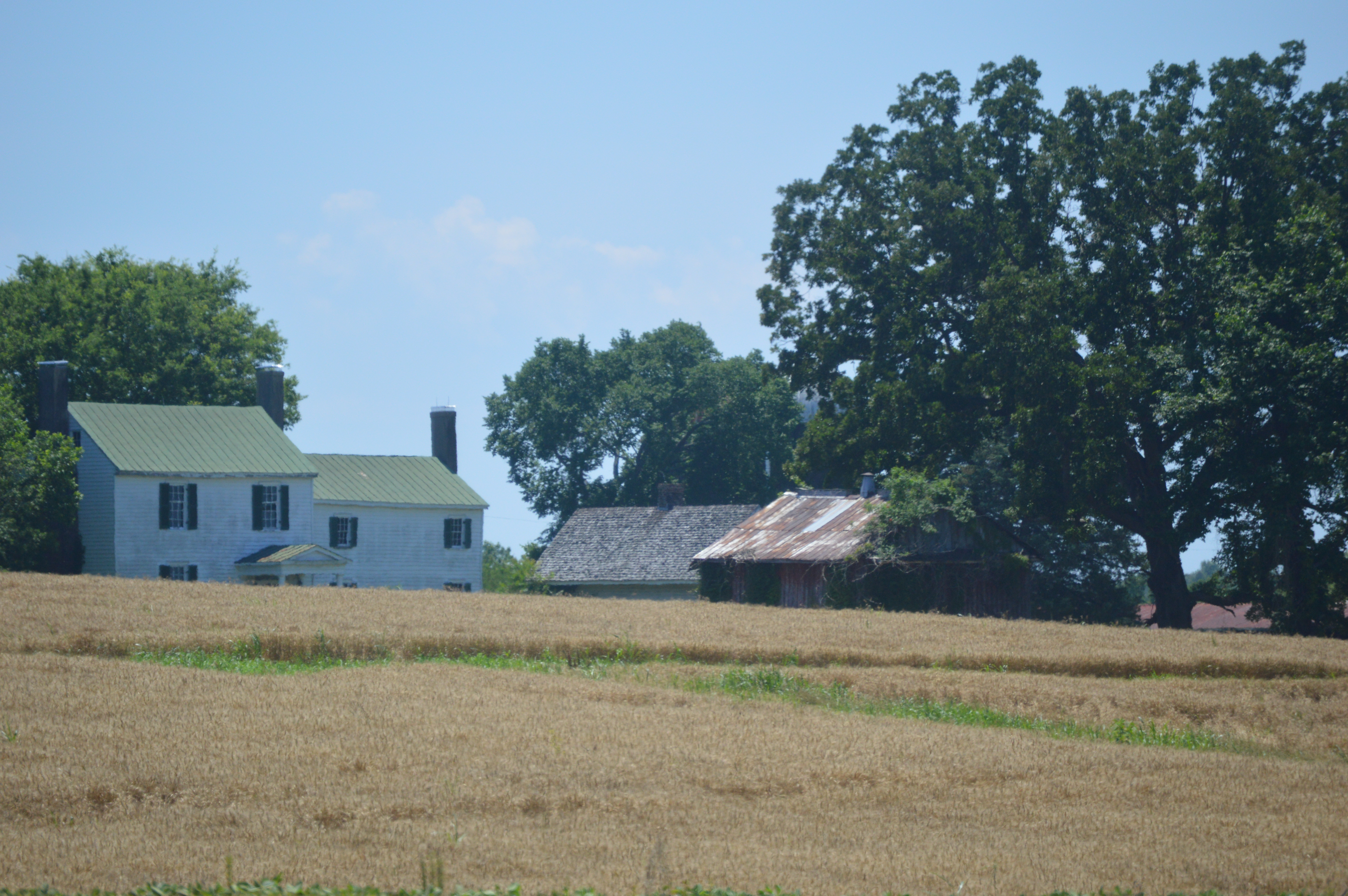
- Overview from the north

- Location within Virginia Location within the United States
- Location: Coleman Drive, 500 feet west of its junction with Henderson Road, Alton, Virginia
- Coordinates: 36°34′45″N 79°07′16″W
- Area: 141 acres (57 ha)
- Built: c. 1800, 1842
- Built by: Thomas Day
- Architectural style: Early Republic, Greek Revival
- NRHP reference No.: 96000495
- VLR No.: 041-0157

Significant dates
- Added to NRHP: April 26, 1996
- Designated VLR: October 18, 1995

Brandon Plantation is a historic plantation home located near Alton, Halifax County, Virginia. The main house is a two-part, frame vernacular farmhouse. The earliest section of the farmhouse is a single-pile, three-bay gable-roof dwelling erected about 1800. Attached to the east end is a two-bay section added about 1842. The interior features details attributed to Thomas Day, a well-known African-American cabinetmaker from Milton, North Carolina. The farmhouse underwent an extensive remodeling and modernization in the early 1960s but preserves a significant degree of architectural integrity. Also on the property are a contributing frame kitchen / slave quarter outbuilding, an early stone-lined well, and the sites of early agricultural outbuildings.

Brandon Plantation is located on SR 697 (Coleman Drive) just west of SR 696 (Henderson Road). Brandon-on-the-Dan, a Register-listed property approximately 2 miles west in the village of Delila, was owned by a different branch of the same family.

Brandon Plantation was listed on the National Register of Historic Places in 1996. It is also on the Virginia Department of Historic Resources list of historic African American sites in Virginia.
