= Brandon-on-the-Dan =

Historic house in Virginia, United States

- U.S. National Register of Historic Places
- U.S. Historic district
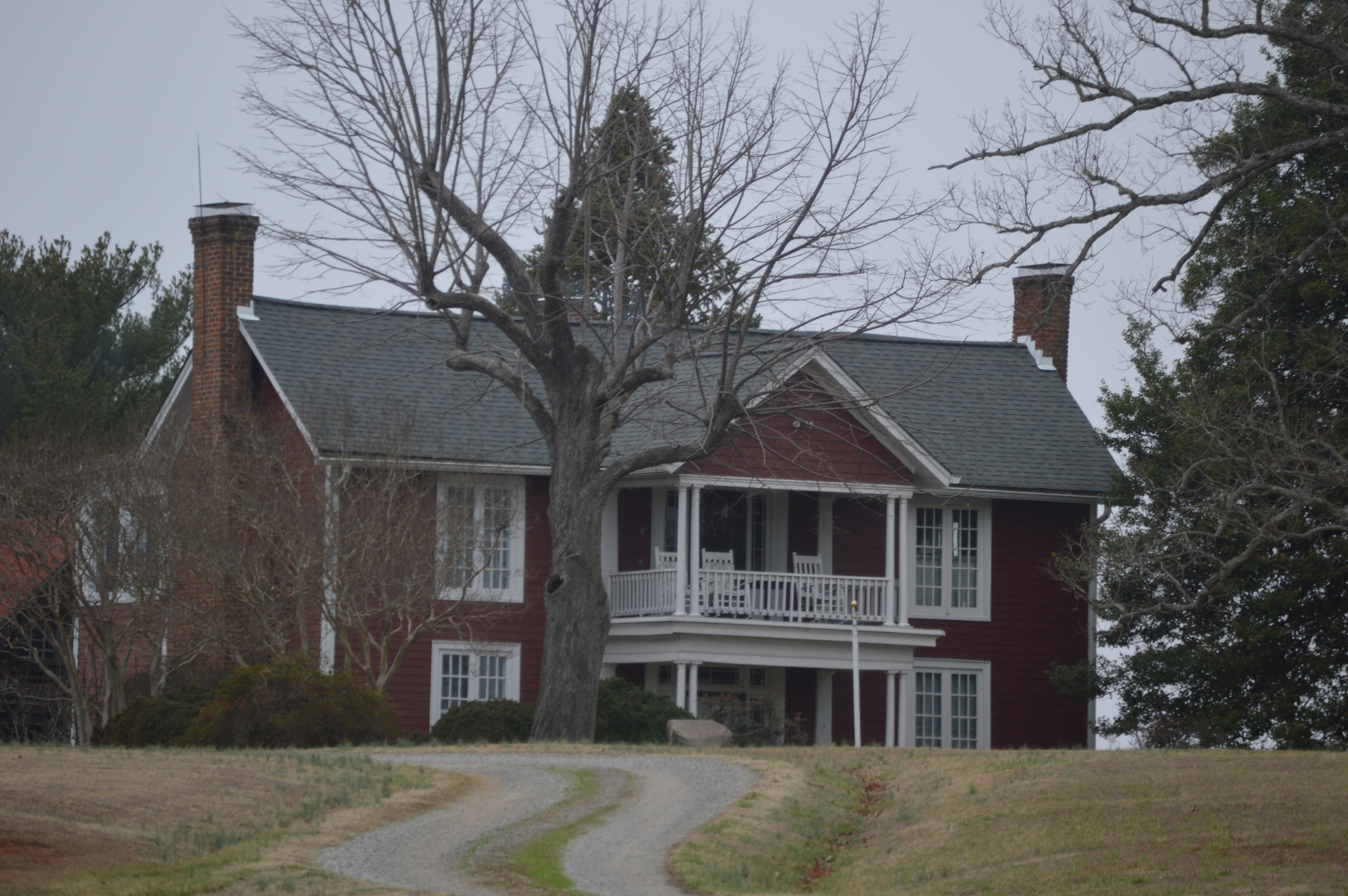
- Front and southern side

- Location within Virginia Location within the United States
- Location: 1072 Calvary Rd., rural Halifax County, Virginia
- Coordinates: 36°34′51″N 79°8′28″W
- Area: 200 acres (81 ha)
- Built: 1855; 1915
- Built by: Thomas Day
- Architectural style: Greek Revival; Craftsman
- NRHP reference No.: 100001510
- Added to NRHP: August 28, 2017

Brandon-on-the-Dan is a historic estate at 1072 Calvary Road (Virginia State Route 119), overlooking the Dan River in rural southwestern Halifax County, Virginia. The estate includes an early log house, and a c. 1855 Greek Revival wood-frame main house that received an extensive Craftsman-style alteration in 1915 by North Carolina African American master craftsman Thomas Day. The 200-acre (81 ha) property also includes a large African American cemetery, and a log tobacco barn; the latter is distinctive as an example of modern log construction.

The name Brandon-on-the-Dan was applied in relatively recent times, to avoid confusion with Brandon Plantation, which was owned by another branch of the same family. Brandon-on-the-Dan was listed on the National Register of Historic Places in 2017. It is also on the Virginia Department of Historic Resources list of historic African American sites in Virginia.

== See also ==
- National Register of Historic Places listings in Halifax County, Virginia
