= Thomas Day (cabinetmaker) =

American cabinetmaker, ca. 1801-ca. 1861

- Born: 1801; Dinwiddie County, Virginia, U.S.
- Died: 1861 (aged 59–60); Milton, North Carolina, U.S.
- Occupations: Cabinetmaker, farmer
- Spouse: Aquilla Wilson (m. 1829)

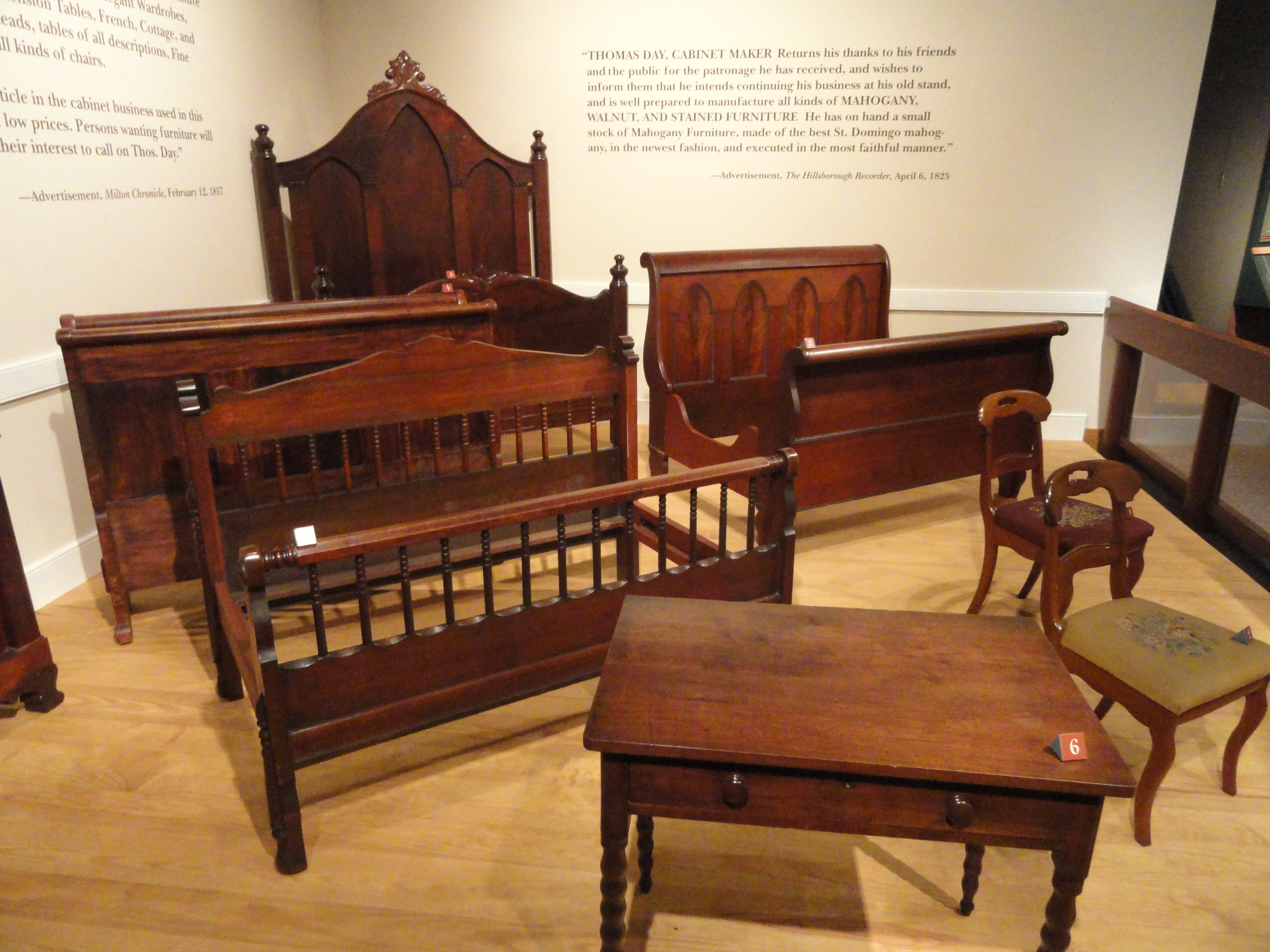
Furniture attributed to Day, North Carolina Museum of History.

Thomas Day (c. 1801–1861) was an American furniture craftsman and cabinetmaker in Milton, Caswell County, North Carolina. Born into a free African-American family in Dinwiddie County, Virginia, Day moved to Milton in 1817 and became a highly successful businessman, boasting the largest and most productive workshop in the state during the 1850s. Day catered to upper-class white clientele and was respected among his peers for his craftsmanship and work ethic. Day came from a relatively well-off family and was privately educated. Today, Day's pieces are highly sought after and sell for high prices; his work has been heavily studied and displayed in museums such as the North Carolina Museum of History. Day is celebrated as a highly skilled craftsman and savvy businessman, specifically in regards to the challenges his race posed to his success in the Antebellum South.

== Education and personal life ==
In about 1801, Day was born into a free African-American family in Dinwiddie County, Virginia. According to John Day Jr., Thomas Day's older brother, Day's father was the grandson of a white plantation mistress from South Carolina. Day's maternal grandparents, the Stewarts, were also free African-Americans of wealth and status in Virginia; they owned a slave-worked plantation and Day's grandfather was a medical doctor. Day's father John Day Sr. was a cabinetmaker of relatively high status as well – he could vote, and was possibly Quaker educated in a time when any formal education was difficult to attain as a free African-American person. Day's proclivity for cabinetmaking and crafting stemmed from his father's career as a cabinetmaker. Day and his older brother were privately educated. They were sent to board with Euro-American families to whom their father was connected through his cabinet and farming businesses, and went to school with the white children; thus Day received a caliber of education similar to that of his white contemporaries.

Although he was a fairly successful cabinetmaker, John Day Sr. often found himself in debt due to alcoholism and gambling, and he moved the family around often to find business in order to earn an income. This problem brought the Day family to North Carolina in 1817, where John went to work for Thomas Reynolds, a furniture craftsman, to pay off his debts, including that from the migration bond imposed on incoming free African-Americans by the state of North Carolina. It was around this time that John Day Jr. and Thomas Day began their own cabinet shop in order to earn their own income, moving to Milton to establish their furniture business. After some time working in North Carolina, John Day Jr. left the furniture business to pursue the ministry, moving back to Virginia with his own family, where he owned a home and a few slaves. After a schism with the Baptist church there, he migrated to Liberia where he served as a missionary and a member of the Supreme Court.

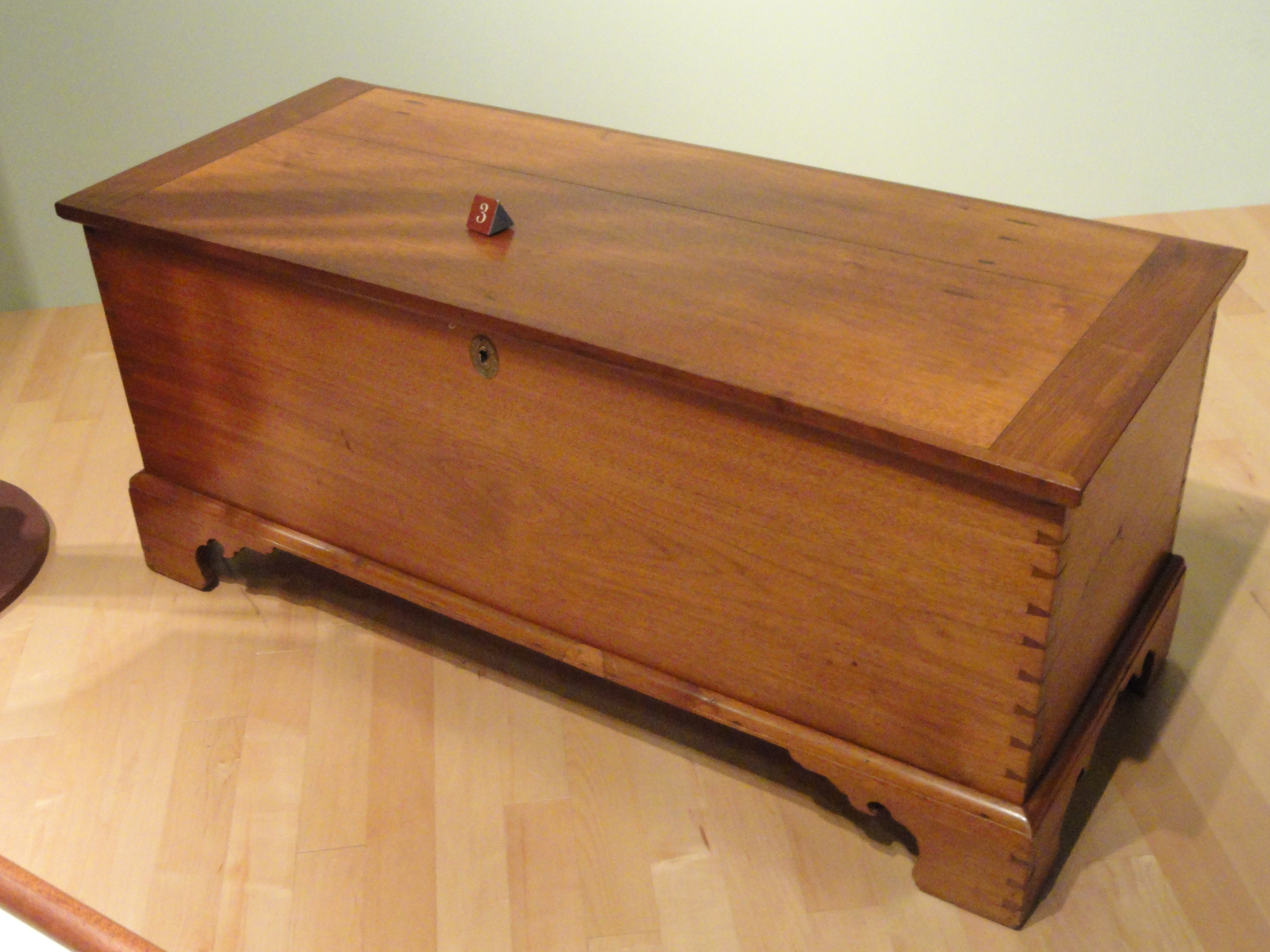
Chest, 1845–1850, Walnut and Yellow Pine, North Carolina Museum of History

=== Marriage and petitions on behalf of wife ===
Thomas Day remained in Milton as a craftsman and achieved success and respect for his skill, and in 1829 he married Aquilla Wilson of Halifax County, Virginia; she, too, was a free Black. However, due to the increasingly strict migration laws imposed by the state of North Carolina, Wilson was barred from entering North Carolina. Upon hearing of this, the townspeople of Milton beseeched the state General Assembly on Day's behalf to allow Wilson to enter the state and live with her husband, stating that a man of Day's status and skill deserved such respect. Even the state Attorney General and lawmaker Romulus Saunders, having been acquainted with Day's craft skill and strong work ethic, testified on his behalf. It was Day's social status and his crafting skill that gained him the support of the white Milton community and eventually led to Wilson being granted a waiver to enter the state. Day and his wife had three children, Mary Ann, Devereux, and Thomas Jr, who were educated in the North. The Day family were also prominent members in the Milton Presbyterian Church, and Aquilla was Day's business partner. In the church, Day and his family were highly respected and they worshipped in the white section of the sanctuary; referred to as Mr. Day by church leadership, Day had the rare privilege to host church sessions in his own home as well as to craft the church pews.

=== Social standing ===
White patronage and Day's education and business prowess allowed him to overcome his race-impacted circumstances and experience capital success as a businessman. In fact, North Carolina laws were fairly loose in regards to free Black rights in comparison to other southern states; the social structure was tolerant of free Blacks and although racism, under law and through social mores, was of course prevalent throughout this time, free Blacks could gain respect and affluence if they were perceived by white society to be hard workers who earned success through their work ethic and personal values. A very small number of free blacks owned slaves, and this helped put a damper on racial tensions because it allowed whites and blacks to connect on a capital and social level and equalized them. Whites believed that free Blacks who owned slaves were less likely than non-slave-owning free Blacks to encourage slave rebellion, and thus were less threatening to society. Many free Blacks in North Carolina owned slaves and experienced capital success as Day did; it was the combination of Day's landowning status, his mixed race, his education and business prowess, and his free black status that led to his success, while his exquisite craftsmanship set him apart from other cabinetmakers.Day owned a total of 14 slaves according to the 1850 United States Census

As Day's life went on, social tensions between whites and free Blacks increased, especially in times of economic bust; combined with the ever-more restrictive laws on free Black rights, this social situation contributed to the decrease in capital success that Day's furniture business experienced in the late 1850s, specifically following the economic panic of 1857. Overall, Day was highly respected in the Milton community, as demonstrated by his status in the church and his affluent, white clientele.

== Furniture business ==
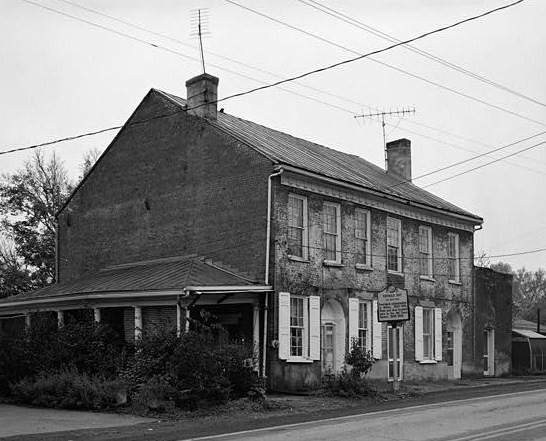
Thomas Day's residence and workshop, Union Tavern, Milton, NC.

After moving to North Carolina with his family in 1817, it appears as though Day had been running his own furniture business before moving to Milton to work with his brother John. Although they were not the only cabinetmakers and craftsmen in the area, the Day Milton shop experienced early success, gaining local recognition and popularity by 1823. After his brother returned to Virginia and then moved to Liberia to pursue missionary work, Thomas Day took over the furniture and craft business in Milton.

In 1827, Day bought property for a workshop on Milton's main street for $550 and proceeded to take out newspaper ads to publicize his business. Over the next decade, Day bought surrounding pieces of property and extended the building structure to expand his workshop, costing another $525. In 1848, Day bought the Union Tavern property in which he ran his workshop until his death in 1861, for $1050. Day ran his Milton workshop for 40 years, constantly keeping a line of furniture for sale in his storefront while also working on outside contracts for high-profile clients.

The Union Tavern building consisted of Day's family home on the second level, Day's workshop in the back, and his showroom on the ground floor. In his shop, Day utilized various forms of labor and crafting techniques. Day employed white apprentices as well as free black and mulatto laborers and his own slaves; his employees numbered anywhere from twelve to fourteen during his career. Day also owned a tobacco farm which earned him profit and on which he also worked his slaves. Scholars estimate that Day employed five white and at least seven black workers in his workshop. Although some scholars have attributed certain lower-quality pieces of furniture to Day himself, it is more likely, according to other researchers, that some of the pieces sold by Day's workshop were produced by his less-skilled, apprenticed craftsmen. To craft his veneered cabinets and other furniture pieces, including beds and bookshelves, Day worked with hand tools in his earlier years, but in the 1840s he introduced steam power into his workshop. This steam power quickened Day's crafting process and increased production levels, because Day could easily replace structural pieces made from standardized design templates using steam power, and could have ready-made elements for when orders were placed. Notably, scholars today can often pinpoint which pieces of furniture were created around this time because they are partially hand-crafted and partially machine-fabricated, indicating that the steam power was new and still being integrated into the crafting process.

Day's workshop created various types of furniture and cabinetry, such as armoires and chairs, as well as architectural work on homes in the northern North Carolina/Southern Virginia area. Day specialized in veneered furniture and relied heavily on mahogany as a work material, which he imported from places in Africa and Central America. It is Day's use of veneers that helps scholars today attribute pieces of furniture to his workshop. In fact, Day stated himself in one of his publicity advertisements that he imported his mahogany from Santo Domingo, and that he kept mahogany furniture on stock for sale. While his work with mahogany came to be known as his trademark, Day also utilized other materials for his furniture such as walnut, seen in the pews he constructed for the Presbyterian church he attended in Milton. Day was strong and confident in his stylistic taste, debating with his clients to ensure that the best quality materials and designs were used.

=== Clientele and economic success ===
The exquisitely crafted furniture created by Day did not go unrecognized. Day's Union Tavern furniture business served high-status organizations and patrons, many of them white, including the University of North Carolina at Chapel Hill and North Carolina Governor David Reid. In 1847, Day won a contract with UNC to create pieces for the Philanthropic and Dialectic Societies. Day worked on this project for two years; as it became more expensive and took longer than expected, his patrons at UNC expressed total faith in his crafting skill and in the worth of his work, although Day's salary had to be kept quiet so as not to enrage other white craftsman in the area over his race and high payment. In 1855, at the height of his capital success, Day was commissioned by Governor Reid to furnish his home; for this project, Day created forty-five pieces of complexly crafted furniture. Following this, in 1856 Day won an award for a crafted furniture piece; he received an “award premium” at the NC State Fair for a wardrobe made of mahogany.

High status clientele boosted Day's notoriety, business, and helped him gain influence in Milton and in the state General Assembly, especially when Day had to fight to get his wife into the state; this trend was also reflected in the way Day was held in high esteem by his segregated church and by all his clients, and by how even today Day's furniture is passed down through families and is held in high regard.

Day's technically savvy production methods as well as his excellent customer service and skilled craftsmanship and designs, scholars like Patricia Phillips Marshall argue, made Day's cabinet workshop in Milton the premier and most capitally successful furniture business in the state of North Carolina. Day was a major contributor to the state economy; scholarly estimates show that he held 20–25% of state capital investment in furniture production within his business, and that his workshop put out 10% of the state's total furniture production. By 1840, that Day held incredible economic influence on the Milton region and that his business held $1500 worth of capital resources and products; in 1850, the Union Tavern business boasted a net worth of $5800 and held around $8000 worth of crafted pieces, tools, and machinery. Day maintained a high personal credit rating and net worth, estimated to be about $40,000 in 1855.

=== Decline and death ===
Day often made sales on credit but could not always collect payments; this combined with the economic panic of 1857 caused Day's business to decline in worth and production in the late 1850s; Day declared bankruptcy and his shop was placed in trust with a business partner. After Day's death, his son Thomas Day Jr. bought the workshop back and kept it running for another decade; the Union Tavern workshop closed for good in 1871.

== Technique and artistry ==
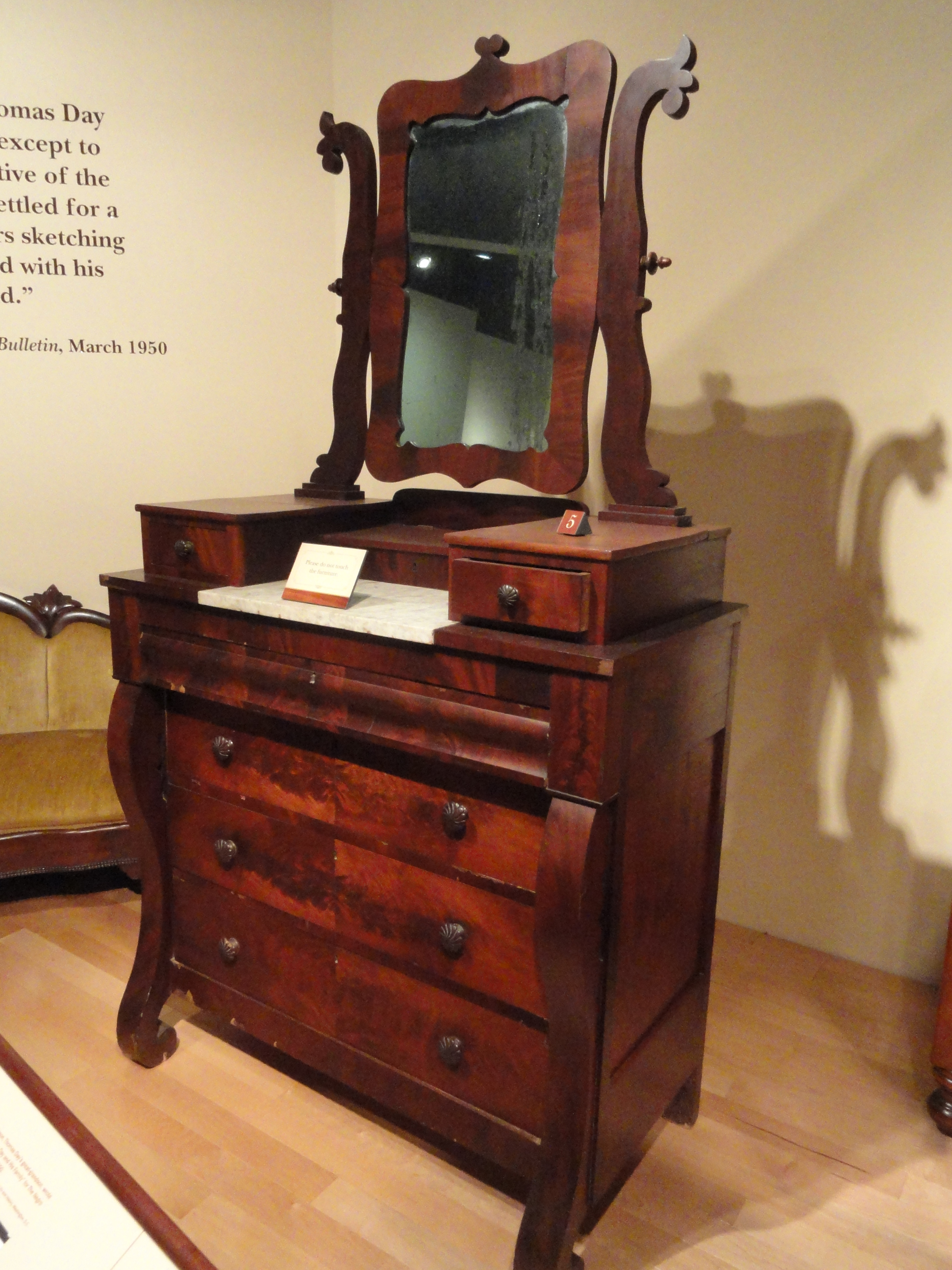
Bureau by William Chiles in the manner of Thomas Day, c. 1860–66, North Carolina Museum of History

Much of Day's capital success and high social status is attributed to his skill in crafting beautiful furniture that his customers sought after; owning a Day piece, with its artful mastery, would confer a symbol of status on a family by demonstrating they had wealth to purchase a luxury good from a skilled artisan workshop. Day tended to employ popular urban styles for the basic design of his pieces, and then add to these designs by improvising his own motifs and style. He most often worked with imported mahogany, and sometimes placed mahogany veneers over structures made from woods of less quality or expense, such as yellow pine or walnut. Thomas Day and his workshop produced various types of furniture and practical pieces, such as wardrobes, bureaus, coffins, commodes, and lounges, as well as created architectural woodwork for wealthy homes in the Milton region. All of Day's work was custom-made, since he altered the basic design of each piece he created to make unique crafts for each customer. It is difficult for modern researchers and scholars to attribute furniture pieces to Day, especially his earlier ones. It is likely that even some pieces attributed to him were in fact fabricated by his apprentices, based on levels of quality; in general, certain pieces are more easily attributed to Day, since he tended to utilize shipping crates with his name on them as materials for interior elements on his furniture.

=== Furniture craftsmanship ===
In his furniture workshop, Day tended to employ his own design style for all of his pieces; this style evolved with popular stylistic trends throughout his few decades as a successful and skilled craftsman. Day's work is characterized by improvisational subscription to popular urban styles of the time and his designs were methodical and symmetrical. Scholars of African and African-American art and design widely agree that this facet of Day's style could reflect his racial heritage, since African and African-American art was highly creative and improvised, with visible rhythms in the designs. However, American design scholars warn against attributing Day's entire design style to his African heritage, because American rural furniture designers of all races often creatively and spontaneously elaborated on popular stylistic themes as well. Essentially, Day took basic structures and ideas from urban trends on furniture designs and elaborated on them utilizing his personal creative taste. This habit of utilizing popular designs, combined with the cost-efficient production methods in his workshop through steam power, made Day's designs not only symbols of status for customers through their style, but also competitively priced. Based on stylistic analysis, it appears that Day pleaded many of his basic design structures for his various furniture pieces from a craftsman pattern book by John Hall, the Cabinet Makers’ Assistant, especially his use of s-shape curves.

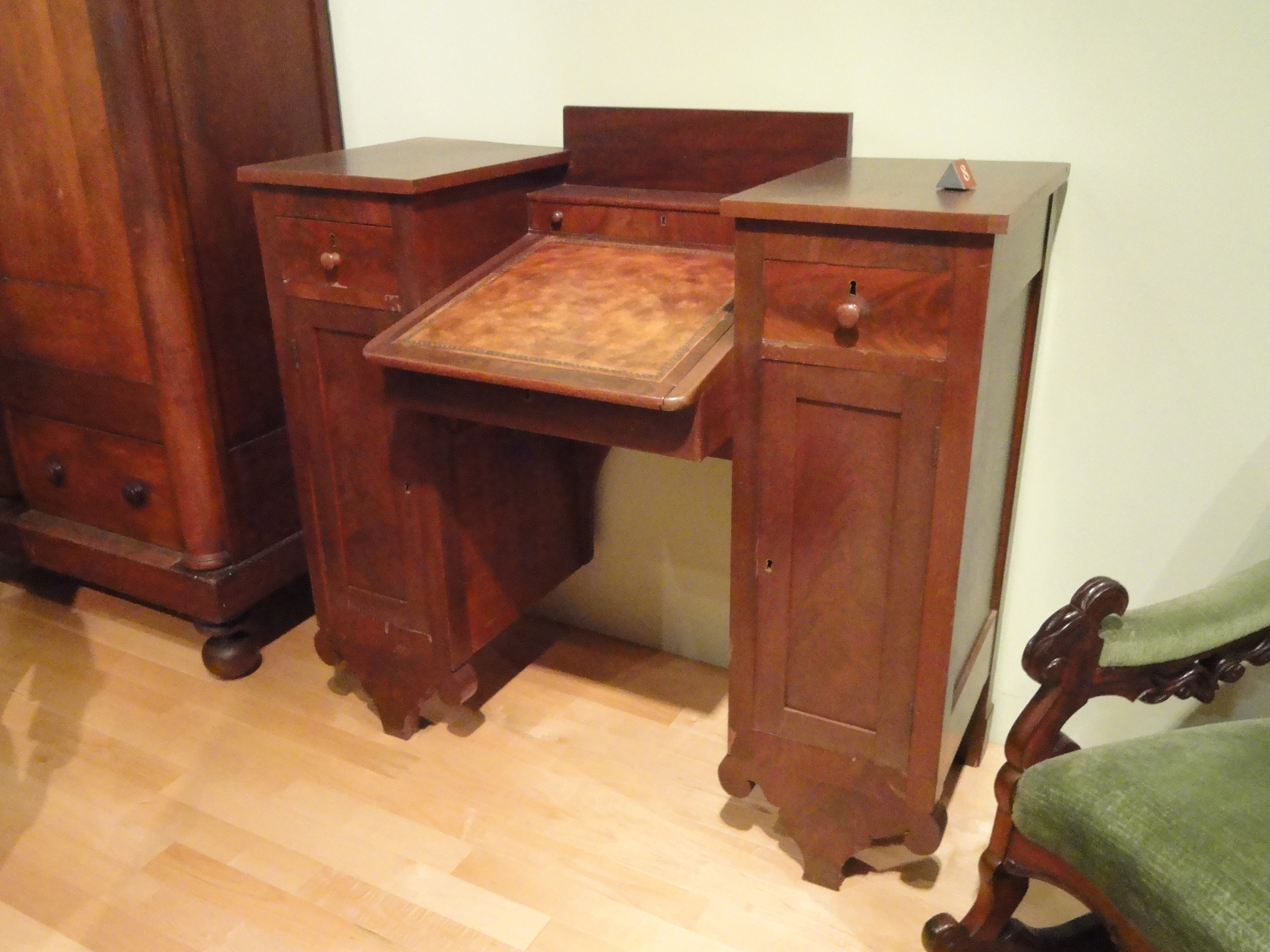
Writing Desk, c. 1840–1850 – North Carolina Museum of History

Day enjoyed employing both horizontal and vertical curvature ornamentations that balanced each other out. Scholars argue that his craftsmanship focused on creating a balance of motion in his pieces, where curvilinear designs as well as scroll motifs suggested motion to the eye, while the interplay between the horizontal and vertical directions, as well as the negative space between such curves, created a sense of balance in the piece. On many of his tables, Day carved animalistic paws, even adding carved fur, onto the clawed foot style that was fashionable at the time, as well as adding carved foliage resembling tobacco leaves. These stylistic choices further illustrate Day's tendency to take popular designs and add his own regional twist, with the tobacco leaves referencing his own tobacco farm as well as the tobacco-growing tradition in North Carolina.

Day's earlier works tended to follow the fashionable Grecian Style, which combined German, French, and English versions of the Greek Revival style to create a design trend wholly American in the way that it took popular styles and combined and elaborated on them. Day's Grecian Style pieces involved intricate moldings and often took pieces common to other types of furniture, such as placing wardrobe-style cornices on a bookshelf. Also demonstrated in Day's pieces under this style are his unique craft methods to create pieces of quality efficiently. For example, to create the illusion of multiple single glass panes in the doors on his bookshelves, Day would place one long, horizontal pane of glass behind singular frames. Day also employed dovetail and mortise-and-tenon joint techniques in his crafting.

Day often used mahogany veneers on his furniture, a technique he came to be known for. Common motifs found in Day's furniture include s-scroll and s-curve shapes as well as thumb shapes in both positive and negative space. The scroll and curve shapes were often used as support pieces for his furniture, such as armrests and legs on chairs and tables, and were employed as a distraction from the large size and heaviness of some of his pieces, especially those that followed the early Gothic trends of large arched designs topping wardrobes and bookshelves. Furthermore, Day's scroll shapes emphasized his personal craft style of creating a balance of motion to draw the eye and create a sense of rhythm in his work. The scroll motif also had a practical usage: Day used scrolled armrests on some of his chair designs to enable military personnel to sit down without having to remove their swords. Playing on this idea of balance, too, Day would often create pieces with sharp, squared edges and designs on top, contrasted by curvilinear motifs on the bottom. Day also tended to emphasize classical elements in his work, such as columns and framed cabinet panels. Day often employed popular design motifs such as ogee curves, serpentine curvatures, and spur motifs; the latter two are commonly seen on Day's chairs. With each of his personal stylistic motifs, Day worked to create balance within motion, and method and symmetry within improvisational spontaneity in his furniture. Another common design tool employed by Day is the interplay between positive and negative space, where positive space is created by actual wood, and negative space is created by the empty spaces between wooden elements on his pieces. By bordering the positive spaces on his furniture with curvatures, Day formed eye-catching negative spaces as well that were meant to again create a sense of balance within the piece.

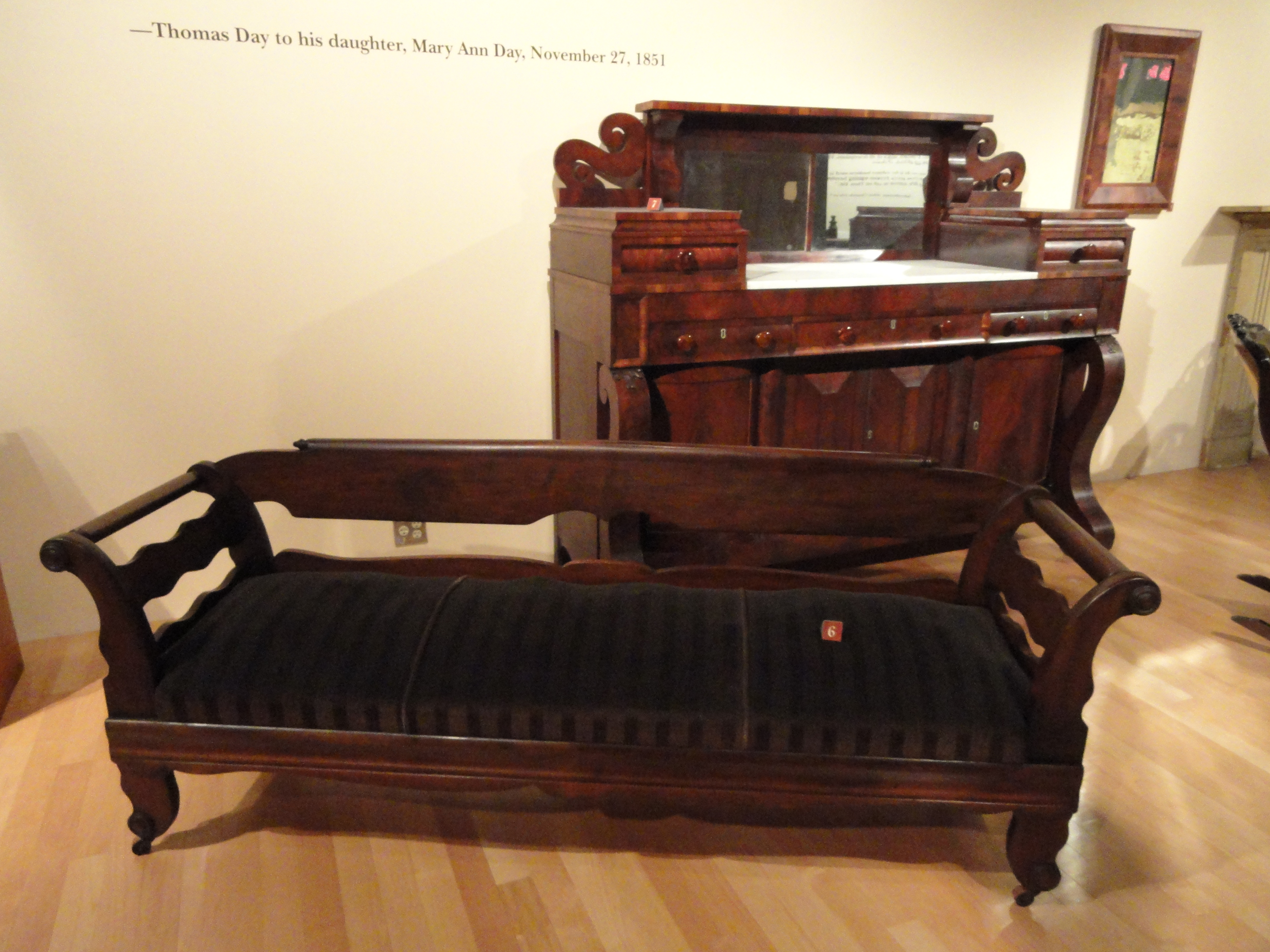
Day Lounge, Thomas Day – North Carolina Museum of History

While many of Day's furniture pieces were simply his personal variations on popular designs of the time, there is one piece of furniture that is considered unique to Day's shop. Regionally known as a Day Bed, the Day style lounge is the furniture piece most associated with Day today. To create his lounge design, Day utilized the basic lounge structure popular at the time, which consisted of a half-back rest and two end rest pieces, one shorter than the other. However, in his altered design, in which he again took inspiration from Hall's pattern book, Day created a wholly unique piece by utilizing the interplay between positive and negative space to create a sense of balance, as well as integrating scroll and s-curves into the lounge rests and legs to suggest motion. The design presented a light lounge with pillar supports that flourished into scroll curves, and the back rest was characterized by curvilinear motifs that created interesting and eye-catching negative space between the wood frame and the couch cushion itself. Twelve of these lounges are known to exist today, and are believed to have been crafted between 1845 and 1860; they are more or less detailed and stylized depending on customer price range, but all have the pillar and scroll designs as well as some form of curvature. Day's use of the scroll motif found inspiration from scrolled volutes on column capitals in classical style.

As his work as a craftsmen developed through the years, so did his style. Moving from early Gothic and Grecian styles towards the Rococo style popular in American furniture markets in the 1850s, Day developed his own stylistic method that scholars today have termed his Exuberant Style. In the Exuberant Style, Day took basic Rococo designs and added his favorite motifs to create unique pieces. This style is often characterized by Day's employment of the relationship between positive and negative space by utilizing contrasting s-curves and c-curves to draw the eye but also strike a symmetrical balance in his pieces; Day's emphasis on symmetry was a divergence from the traditional Rococo style, which often employed asymmetry to create interesting visual effects. Exuberant Style also included scalloped edge designs to create a cloud-like image, and thumb motifs in both the positive and negative spaces to reflect the idea of balance and symmetry. This style was used in almost all of his furniture in the 1850s. Day's usage of curvilinear designs, as well as his expert employment of positive and negative space, can be viewed as a predecessor to the Art Nouveau Style.

=== Architectural craftsmanship ===
With his furniture designs so popular and highly sought-after, Day began to provide architectural work to homes in his region as well. In this architectural work, Day employed many of the same design motifs as in his furniture, playing again off his own interpretation of the Grecian/Greek Revival Style. For large plantation homes in the North Carolina and Virginia areas, Day provided mantle pieces, stair brackets and newel posts, and door frames among other architectural work. His work focused on symmetry, and he often incorporated similar or complementary designs in the newel posts and stair brackets to create a balance of design and to emphasize his furniture designs, since many homes he did architectural work for also boasted multiple furniture works by Day. As with his furniture designs, it appears that Day's initial architectural designs stemmed from popular architectural pattern books; to these, Day would again add his personal design motifs to create unique products.

In his work on door frames, scholars agree that Day created both sidelights and transoms for interior doors in many homes he worked on. These architectural elements are characterized by the repetitive use of rectangular patterns. Day also often created newel posts for staircases, which he commonly designed utilizing s-curves and elongated scroll shapes, which represented Day's interpretation of the traditional newel post; Day's posts were both larger and longer than the classic Greek Revival Style posts, and are emphasized by the simplistic stair banisters that accompany them. As with his furniture, Day took the popular design of the newel post and added his own stylistic flair through his scroll curves. In crafting these newel posts, Day employed four different types of newels: s-shaped, traditional, a fusion of the two, or completely unique designs; today, twenty-five s-shaped newel posts have been attributed to Day. Day crafted stair brackets to match and complement these newel posts, again employing curvatures and wave motifs that, combined with the newel posts, suggested a tranquil fluidity. The choice to match newel posts and stair brackets appears to be unique to Day's architectural work. Day's mantle designs are often characterized by ionic columns topped with serpentine friezes, but some mantle pieces also employed horizontal and vertical linear designs to create a sharpness in his pieces.

Overall, Day's architectural work, much like his furniture craftsmanship, focuses on creating a balance of motion through complementary curvatures. Unlike his furniture, however, Day sometimes added carved faces to his architectural work, especially on mantle pieces, as seen on a mantle in the Long House. Although some scholars have argued that Day's use of these faces represents his connections to his African heritage, since the use of carved faces was popular in African cultural images and craft designs, most scholars today agree that Day's carved faces have a more Euro-American design heritage. Expert John Kouwenhoven has classified Day's artistic style as being a combination of accepted design traditions with more rural or folk artistic practices reflecting the Southern culture surrounding him; thus, it is more likely, according to scholarly research, that Day was simply employing his own regional creativity to popular urban styles as was his tendency, rather than utilizing a distant cultural heritage that Day, as a free mulatto integrated into high-status white society, likely had little personal connection to. Kouwenhoven has described Day's style as inherently American in the way that it combines both popular and folk design traditions, but these carved faces of angular design do somewhat reflect African design traditions and could represent a cultural link in Day's craftsmanship to his heritage, however tenuous. Today, seven houses on the National Register of Historic Places contain interior or exterior woodwork attributed to Thomas Day: Brandon Plantation, William Henry and Sarah Holderness House, Longwood, James Malone House, Woodside, Oak Ridge (Danville, Virginia), and Burleigh Plantation. Fittings in the Presbyterian Church and Baptist Meeting House (Milton Church) located in the Milton Historic District are also attributed to him.

== Legacy ==
Thomas Day was a skilled craftsman and created highly unique furniture and architecture. Following the Civil War and throughout the 20th century, Day was recognized for his perseverance, talent, and ambition. Known as "an exceptional craftsman with strong middle-class value system and work ethic", Day's mulatto race was outweighed by his skill and success and was thus remembered and his work treasured as racial tensions rose in American society.

Day's Union Tavern workshop was placed on the National Register of Historic Places in 1975, but unfortunately burned down in 1989. Since the fire, there have been successful efforts to restore the workshop and turn it into a functional and educational museum on Day and his craftsmanship: the Historic Preservation Foundation of North Carolina, Inc. bought the burned structure and created the Thomas Day House/Union Tavern Restoration organization. Since the 1990s, the group has been dedicated to rebuilding Union Tavern and restoring the legacy of Thomas Day. Today, Union Tavern is restored and is a hands-on museum to Day's life and work, featuring actual pieces of Day's furniture that visitors can touch and examine.

Although public remembrance and appreciation of Day was very present, especially in the Milton and black communities, throughout the late 19th and 20th centuries, scholarly research on Day's life and work was lacking until recently. Several research initiatives into Day's furniture and architectural craftsmanship were undertaken in the 1980s and 1990s; these helped to identify Day's crafted pieces as well as his building and design techniques. Since then, historians and architectural experts have been continually taking stock of Day's existing work, both furniture and architecture, in homes in the northern North Carolina/southern Virginia areas. There is an antique shop called Carol's Collectibles in Roxboro that often houses Day's work.

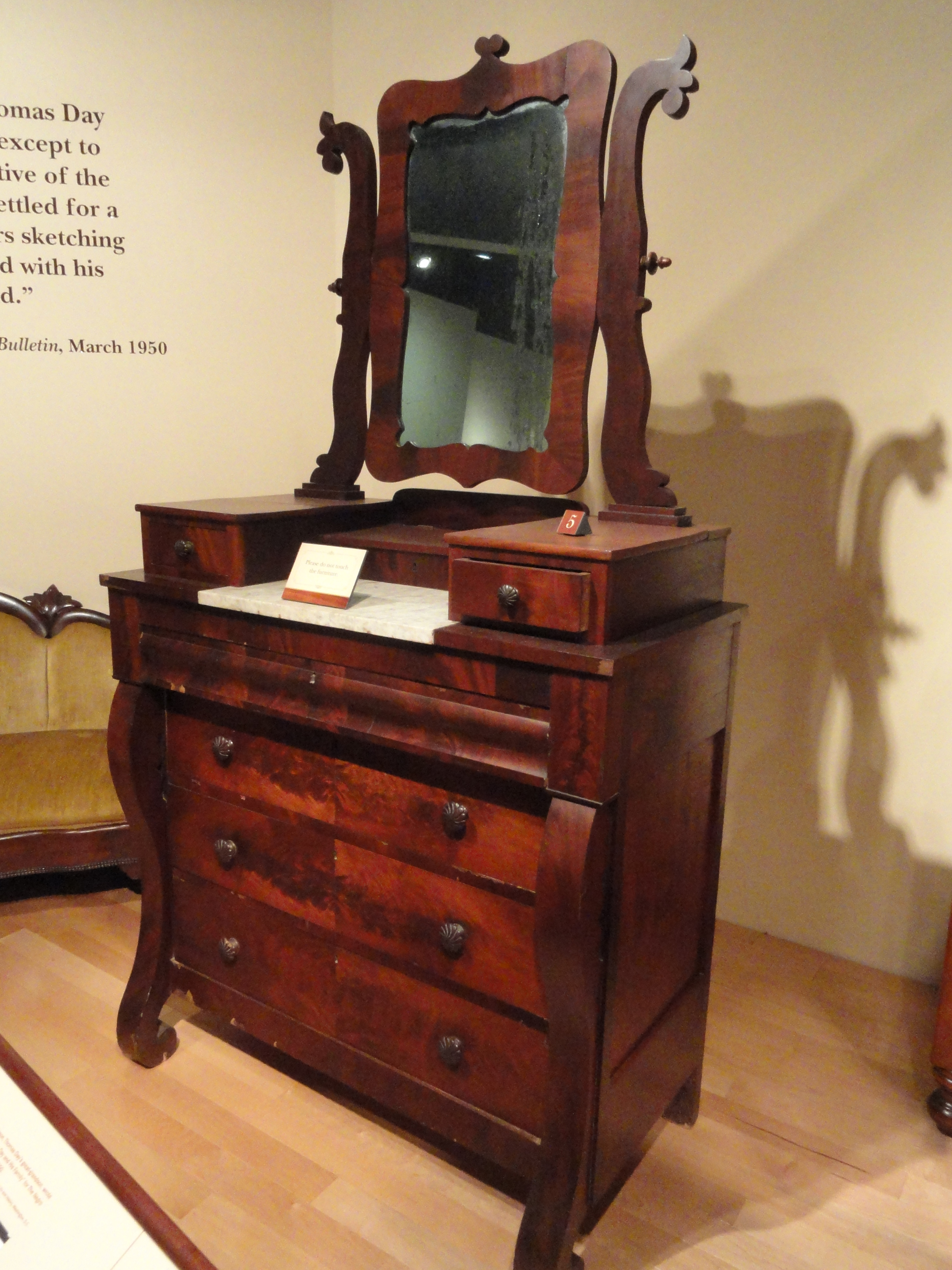
Bureau, c. 1860–1866 – North Carolina Museum of History

Day’s work has often been featured in museum exhibits, first notably at the North Carolina Museum of History. This exhibit, which debuted in 1975, was curated by Rodney Barfield was titled “Thomas Day, Cabinetmaker” and was made possible by a donation of $7,000 to the museum by the African-American sorority Delta Sigma Theta, which enabled the museum to purchase the furniture Day created for Governor Reid in 1855 and 1858. Following this exhibit, the museum acquired the largest collection in the world of Day's furniture work. In 1994, a touring DuSable exhibit on African-American craftsmanship featured eleven works attributed to Day, as well as one piece attributed to his son Devereux. Just one year later, an initiative titled the Thomas Day Education Project was founded; it aims to educate the public on Day and the history of black entrepreneurship by working with the NC Museum of History to train teachers and provide educational materials. The group also produced a documentary on Day for public television. in 1996, the NC Museum of History featured another exhibit on Day, titled “With All Necessary Care and Attention: The Artistry of Thomas Day” which put over twenty examples of his work on display. Following a few quiet years, a North Carolina furniture mall featured crafted pieces by Day in its atrium to celebrate Black History Month in 2000. In 2001, a festival was held in Day's honor in North Carolina, hosted by the Minority Entrepreneur Training Institute of North Carolina. At the festival, important figures including a state Supreme Court justice spoke, and black dance groups performed, and pieces of Day's furniture were displayed as well; the festival aimed to encouraged black and other minority entrepreneurship in the state. Later, in 2009, an event titled “Uncovering the Hidden History of Thomas Day” was held by the Apprend Foundation to encourage public education about Day. In 2010, a new exhibit on Day titled “Behind the Veneer: Thomas Day, Master Cabinetmaker” and curated by Patricia Phillips Marshall, premiered at the NC Museum of History. The collection featured in this exhibit, made up of 78 pieces, was built from private holdings, contributions from the Thomas Day House/Union Tavern Restoration organization, and the museum permanent collection. Most recently, the Renwick Gallery at the Smithsonian American Art Museum in Washington, D.C., featured an exhibit on Day titled “Thomas Day: Master Craftsman and Free Man of Color,” based on Phillips Marshall's 2010 book on Day of the same name that represents a decade of research on Day.

The recent academic research along with public education and outreach efforts through museum exhibits and organized events, has contributed to increased public awareness of Thomas Day and recognition of his work as a skilled craftsman. The furniture company Craftique sells a line of reproductions of Day's work; past profits from this line were donated to the restoration fund for the Union Tavern workshop. Day's furniture is still treasured by owners and scholars alike, demonstrating its lasting craftsmanship, and pieces thought to be crafted by Day sell for high prices, including an $8,000 wardrobe from Day's workshop. Day's legacy in North Carolina and in the historical community today is strong and lasting as the public grows more interested in Day's life and work, and exhibits and events in his honor prosper. A successful life and a strong work ethic earned Day a reputation of skill and service that has lasted long past his life; he is permanently memorialized in statue form outside of the NC Museum of History, alongside statues of a Native American Sauratown Woman and the museum's founder, placing him irrevocably in mainstream history both in North Carolina, in the field of historical craftsmanship, and in the public memory.

== See also ==
- John Day (Liberian judge)
