= North Carolina Highway 119 =

State highway in North Carolina, US

North Carolina Highway 119
- NC 119 in red, former NC 119 alignment through Mebane in grey

Route information
- Maintained by NCDOT
- Length: 42.2 mi (67.9 km)
- Existed: ca. 1940–present

Major junctions
- South end: NC 54 in Swepsonville
- I-40 / I-85 in Mebane; US 70 in Mebane; US 158 near Yanceyville
- North end: SR 119 at the Virginia state line near Semora

Location
- Country: United States
- State: North Carolina
- Counties: Alamance, Caswell

Highway system
- North Carolina Highway System; Interstate; US; State; Scenic
← NC 118	→ NC 120

North Carolina Highway 119 (NC 119) is a primary state highway in the U.S. state of North Carolina.

== Route description ==
It runs from NC 54 in Swepsonville north via Mebane, Hightowers, and Semora to the Virginia state line, where it continues as State Route 119.

== History ==
Established in 1940, NC 119 was a renumbering of NC 103 between NC 54 and NC 49, in Alamance County. In 1954, NC 119 was extended north, on new primary routing, to the Virginia border. In 1964, Virginia reciprocated by establishing SR 119 from the state line north to US 58/US 360.

The North Carolina Department of Transportation has long planned to reroute the highway, currently running through central Mebane, to a new alignment further west. However, in 1998 and 1999, civil rights complaints were filed by the West End Revitalization Association and other local residents against the Department of Transportation and city government over concerns about disproportionate impacts on predominantly African-American communities along the proposed route and longstanding dissatisfaction with access to municipal services. Although a four-year moratorium on the project was established in 1999, the Federal Highway Administration eventually granted approval in December 2009.

A project that started in 1990 relocated NC 119 west of Mebane, creating a new 4 to 6-lane divided highway from I-40/I-85 to Mrs. White Lane (SR 1918). The project was broken into two parts, with a combined estimate of $101.9 million; property acquisitions were expected after 2014. The relocated alignment opened to traffic on May 27, 2022, as mostly an expressway directly avoiding the downtown center

== Junction list ==
County	Location	mi	km	Destinations	Notes
Alamance	Swepsonville	0.0	0.0	NC 54 – Graham, Alamance	Southern terminus
Alamance	Mebane	4.0	6.4	I-40 east / I-85 north – Durham I-40 west (Wan Wan Highway) / I-85 south – Burlington	Diverging diamond interchange; exit 153 on I-85
Alamance		6.7	10.8	US 70 – Hillsborough, Haw River	Quadrant interchange with connector road (James Walker Road)
Alamance	Pleasant Grove	13.2	21.2	NC 49 – Haw River, Roxboro	
Caswell	Hightowers	24.7	39.8	NC 86 – Prospect Hill, Yanceyville	
Caswell	Leasburg	30.4	48.9	US 158 – Yanceyville, Roxboro	
Caswell	Semora	39.1	62.9	NC 57 – Milton, Roxboro	
Caswell	Milton	42.2	67.9	SR 119 north (Calvary Road) to US 58 / US 360 (Philpott Road) – Danville, South Boston	Virginia state line; northern terminus
1.000 mi = 1.609 km; 1.000 km = 0.621 mi: Concurrency terminus

== See also ==
- North Carolina Bicycle Route 4 - Concurrent with NC 119 from Stephentown Road to Osmond Road near Hyco Lake
