= Milton Historic District (Milton, North Carolina) =

Historic district in North Carolina, United States

- U.S. National Register of Historic Places
- U.S. Historic district
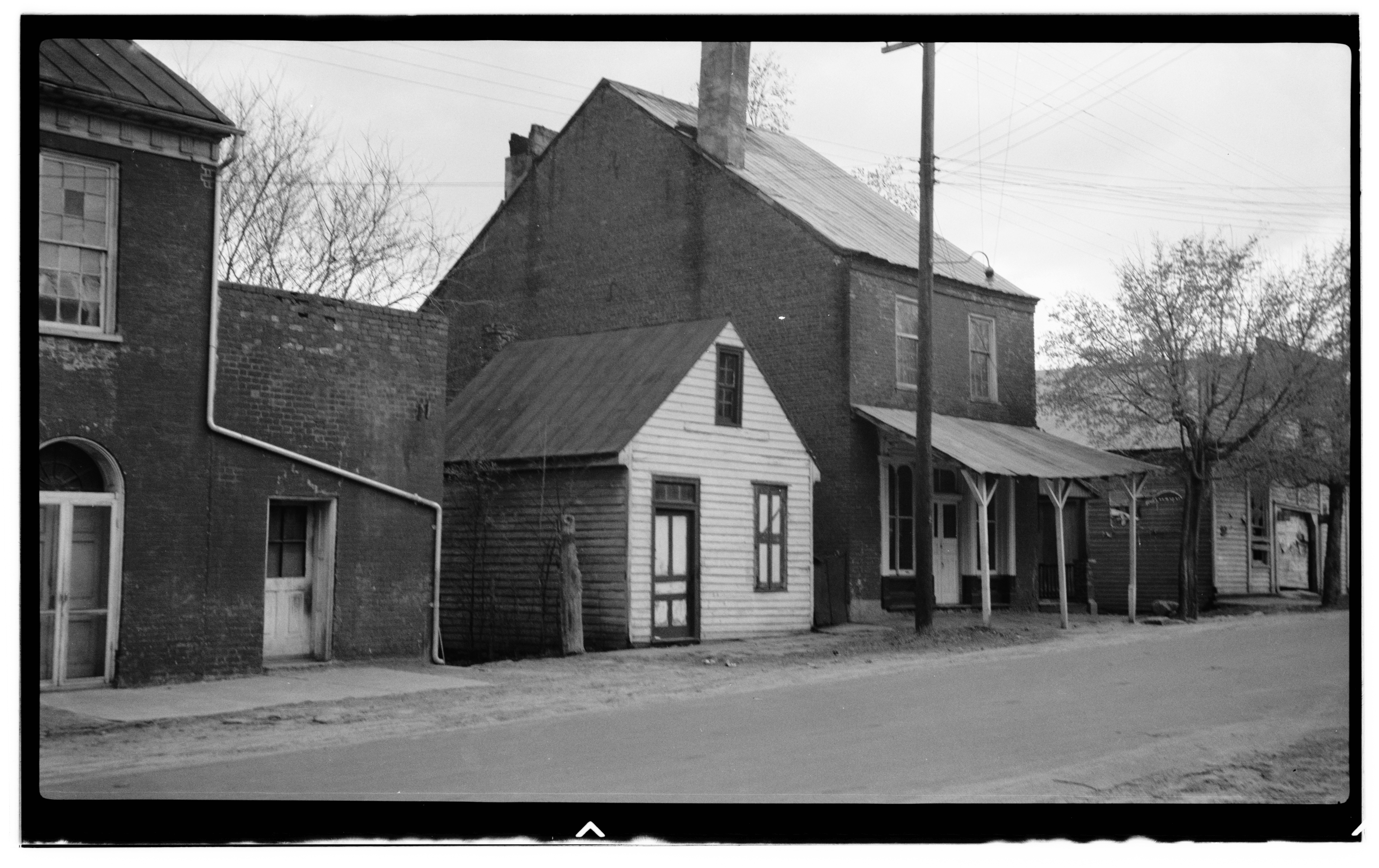
- Commercial buildings on Broad Street

- Location within North Carolina Location within the United States
- Location: Runs along Main St. from Atlantic and Danville RR to County Line Creek, Milton, North Carolina
- Coordinates: 36°32′15″N 79°12′25″W
- Area: 240 acres (97 ha)
- Built: 1820
- Built by: Day, Thomas
- Architectural style: Greek Revival, Federal
- NRHP reference No.: 73001306
- Added to NRHP: October 25, 1973

Milton Historic District is a national historic district located at Milton, Caswell County, North Carolina. It encompasses 15 contributing buildings in the town of Milton. The district includes notable examples of Federal and Greek Revival style architecture. In addition to the separately listed Milton State Bank and Union Tavern, other notable buildings include the Clay-Lewis-Irvine House, Winstead House, Presbyterian Church, Baptist Meeting House (Milton Church), Old Shops, Old Stores, and row houses. Fittings in the Presbyterian Church and Baptist Meeting House (Milton Church) are attributed to noted African-American cabinetmaker Thomas Day.

It was added to the National Register of Historic Places in 1973.
