= Milton State Bank =

- U.S. National Register of Historic Places
- U.S. Historic district – Contributing property
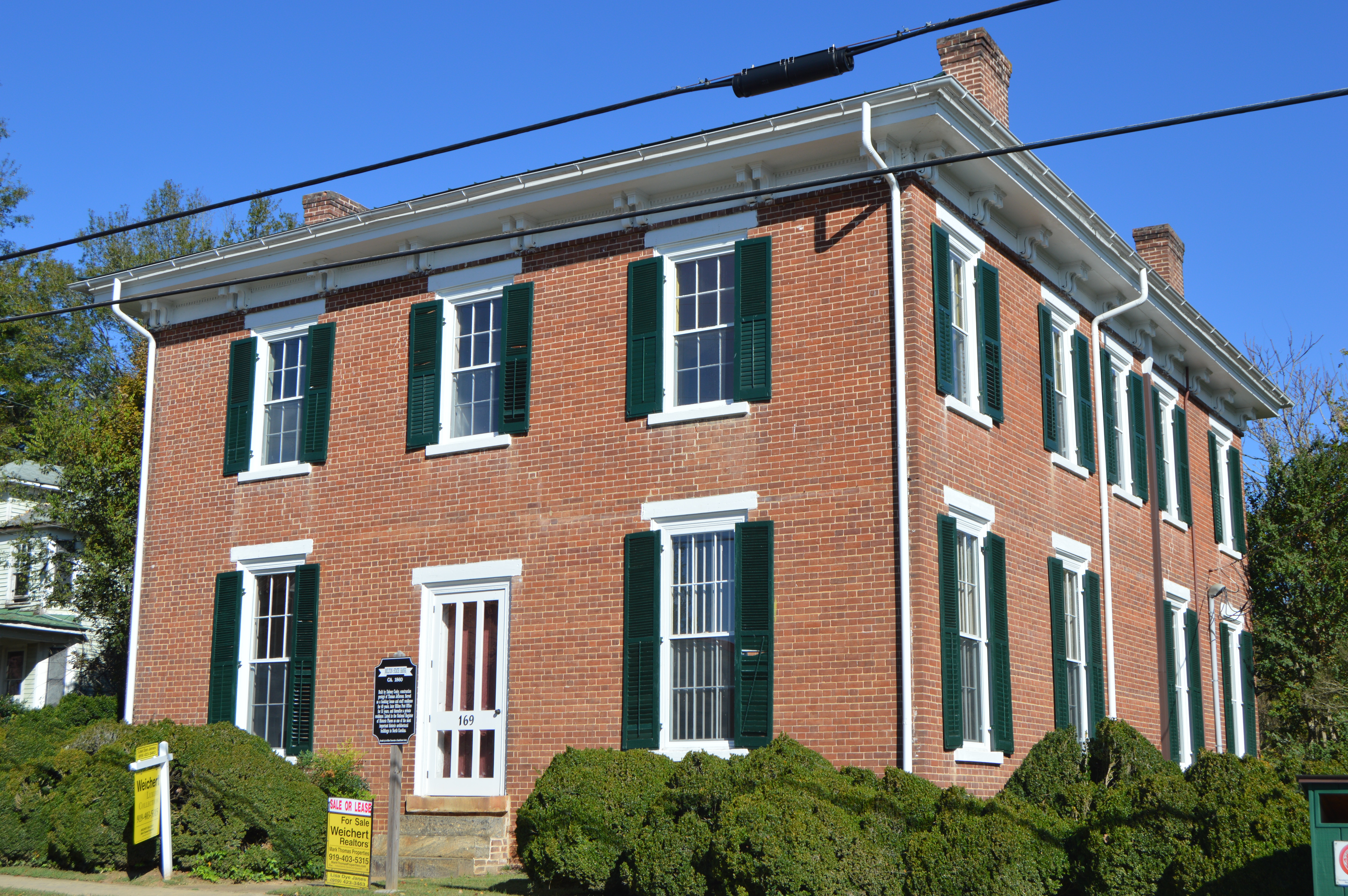
- Front and eastern side

- Location within North Carolina Location within the United States
- Location: Main (Broad) St., Milton, North Carolina
- Coordinates: 36°32′19″N 79°12′17″W
- Area: 1 acre (0.40 ha)
- Built: 1860
- Architectural style: Greek Revival
- NRHP reference No.: 73001307
- Added to NRHP: April 13, 1973

Milton State Bank, also known as the Branch Bank of the Bank of the State of North Carolina at Milton, is a historic bank building located at Milton, Caswell County, North Carolina. It was built in 1860, and is a two-story, three bay by five bay, Greek Revival-style brick building. Its brickwork is laid Flemish bond. It housed a bank on the first floor and residential unit on the second. It housed a bank until about 1914. From about 1914 to 1963 the building served as a combination residence and the Milton Post Office. It was subsequently converted to residential usage.

It was added to the National Register of Historic Places in 1973. It is located in the Milton Historic District.

Currently Milton Renaissance Foundation, a nonprofit, leases the building and houses a museum and visitors center.
