= Union Tavern =

- U.S. National Register of Historic Places
- U.S. National Historic Landmark
- U.S. Historic district – Contributing property
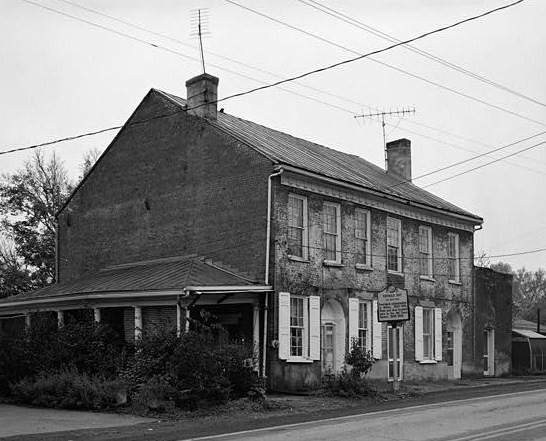
- Union Tavern

- Location within North Carolina Location within the United States
- Location: Broad St., Milton, North Carolina
- Coordinates: 36°32′19″N 79°12′22.5″W
- Area: less than one acre
- Built: early 19th century
- Architectural style: Federal
- Part of: Milton Historic District (ID73001306)
- NRHP reference No.: 75001245

Significant dates
- Added to NRHP: May 15, 1975
- Designated NHL: May 15, 1975
- Designated CP: October 25, 1973

Union Tavern is a historic tavern and workshop on Broad Street in Milton, North Carolina. It is a rare example of a well-preserved early 19th-century Federal period tavern, and is further notable as the workshop of Thomas Day (c. 1801–1861), a free person of color who was one of North Carolina's leading cabinetmakers. The building was designated a National Historic Landmark in 1975. It is located in the Milton Historic District.

== Description and history ==
The Union Tavern is located in the center of the rural community of Milton, on the south side of Broad Street (North Carolina Highway 57), between Palmer's Alley and Ler's Alley. It is a 2-1/2 story brick structure, set close to the road, with a gabled roof. Its front facade is six bays wide, with three entrances, each set in a round-arch opening with a fanlight above. Windows are rectangular sash, with stone sills and brick lintels. An enclosed single-story porch extends across the left (east) side, and there is a single-story ell to the rear. The interior of the building has retained some of its original features, despite repeated alteration of the rooms for different uses.

Thomas Day was born in Virginia in 1801, a free person of color. By 1818 he had begun to work as a cabinetmaker, and in 1823 he moved to Milton, where he purchased and adapted this building as his studio and workshop. His skill as a craftsman was widely regarded: he catered to North Carolina's wealthiest residents, and was by mid-century operating the state's largest workshop. He was notable for training white apprentices, other free blacks, and the slaves of nearby slaveholders, and for his own ownership of slaves. When he married a free woman from Virginia, the state legislature exempted her from the state's ban on the entry of free blacks after he threatened to move. He is also said to have done the woodwork in the local church, on condition that he be permitted to sit in the area normally reserved to whites.

== See also ==
- List of National Historic Landmarks in North Carolina
- National Register of Historic Places listings in Caswell County, North Carolina
