= Longwood (Milton, North Carolina) =

Historic house in North Carolina, United States

- U.S. National Register of Historic Places
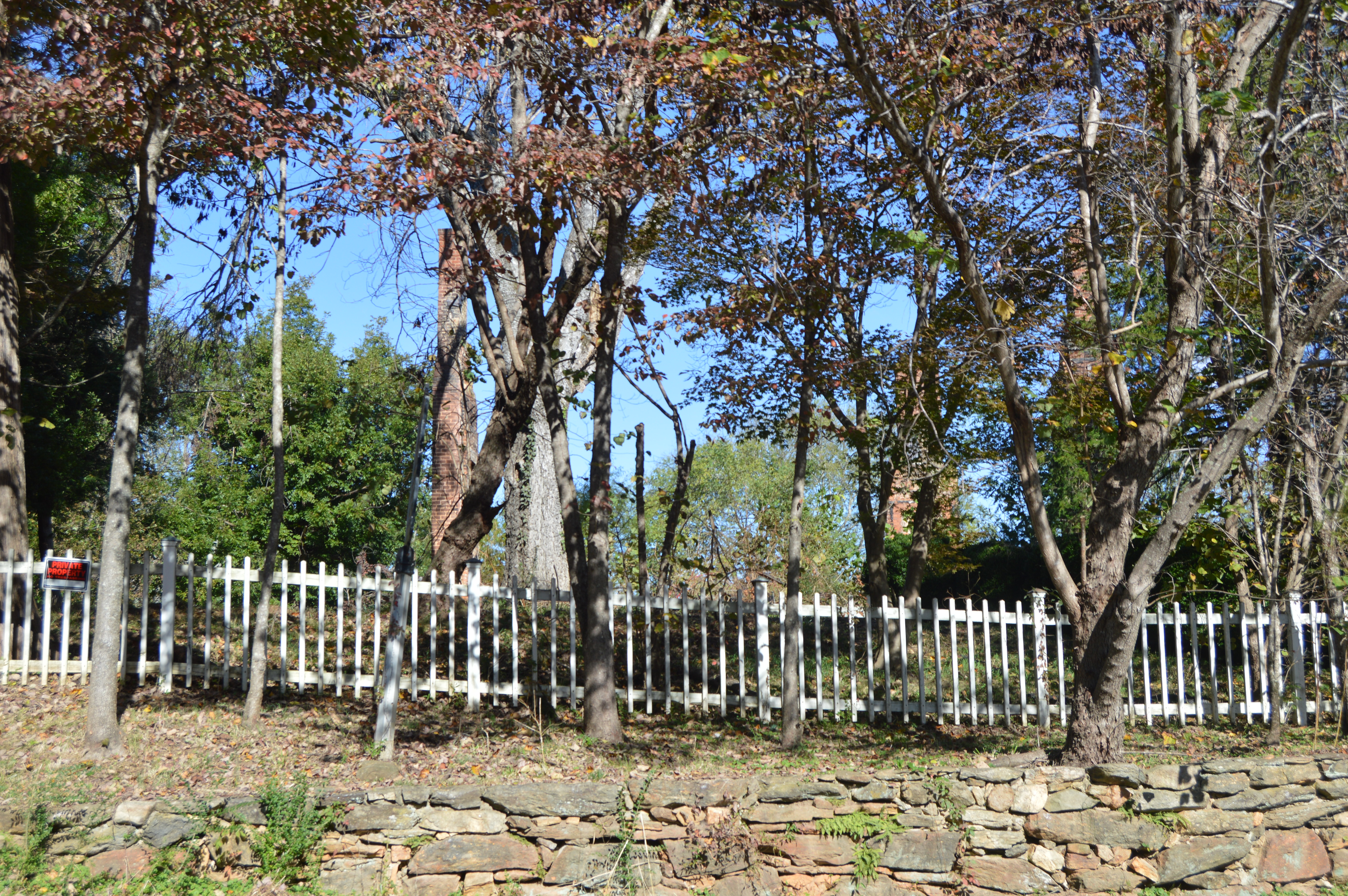
- Site of the house, with nothing remaining but the chimneys

- Location within North Carolina Location within the United States
- Location: SW of Milton on NC 62, near Milton, North Carolina
- Coordinates: 36°31′40″N 79°13′10″W
- Area: 7 acres (2.8 ha)
- Built: c. 1810, 1833, 1855
- Built by: Thomas Day
- Architectural style: Greek Revival, Federal
- NRHP reference No.: 76001312
- Added to NRHP: September 15, 1976

Longwood is a historic plantation house located near Milton, Caswell County, North Carolina. The original section was built about 1810, and is a two-story, four-bay-by-one bay Federal style frame block. It has a two-bay-wide and one-bay-deep Greek Revival style addition forming an overall L-shaped dwelling. The interior features woodwork attributed to noted African-American cabinetmaker Thomas Day. Also on the property are the frame kitchen, log corn crib, log tenant house, and log tobacco barn. It is believed to have been the home of U.S. Congressman Romulus Mitchell Saunders early in his career.

It was added to the National Register of Historic Places in 1976.

The house was destroyed by fire on December 26, 2013.
