= Alton, Virginia =

Unincorporated community in Virginia, United States

- Unincorporated community
- Location within Virginia Location within the United States
- Coordinates: 36°34′24″N 79°0′10″W
- Country: United States
- State: Virginia
- County: Halifax
- Elevation: 551 ft (168 m)
- Time zone: UTC−5 (Eastern (EST))
  - Summer (DST): UTC−4 (EDT)
- GNIS feature ID: 1492467

Alton (also known as Warrens Shop) is an unincorporated community in Halifax County, Virginia, United States.

== Visitor attractions ==
- Brandon Plantation, listed on the National Register of Historic Places
- Virginia International Raceway
