= Virginia State Route 119 =

State highway in Halifax County, Virginia, US

State Route 119
- Calvary Road

Route information
- Maintained by VDOT
- Length: 3.08 mi (4.96 km)
- Existed: 1964–present

Major junctions
- South end: NC 119 near Delila
- North end: US 58 / US 360 / SR 694 at Delila

Location
- Country: United States
- State: Virginia
- Counties: Halifax

Highway system
- Virginia Routes; Interstate; US; Primary; Secondary; Byways; History; HOT lanes
← SR 118	→ SR 120

State Route 119 (SR 119) is a primary state highway in the U.S. state of Virginia. Known as Calvary Road, the state highway runs 3.08 miles (4.96 km) from the North Carolina state line, where the highway continues as North Carolina Highway 119 (NC 119), north to U.S. Route 58 (US 58)/US 360 at Delila.

== Route description ==
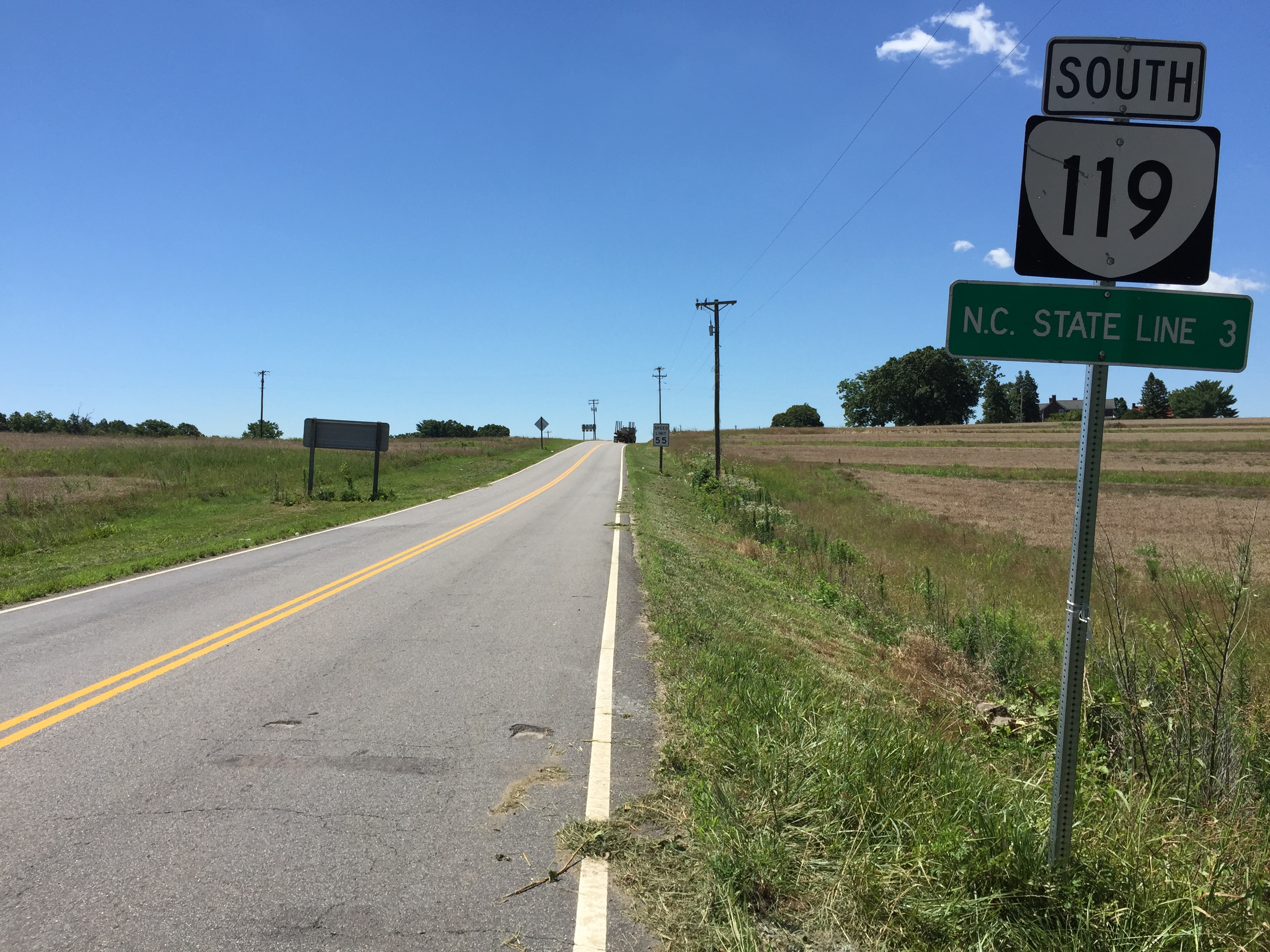
View south at the north end of SR 119 at US 58/US 360 and SR 694 in Delila

SR 119 begins at the North Carolina state line in southwestern Halifax County. The highway continues south as NC 119 through the northeastern corner of Caswell County to Semora. SR 119 heads north as a two-lane undivided road through a mix of forest and farmland. The state highway passes Calvary Cemetery about halfway between the state line and the highway's northern terminus at US 58/US 360 (Philpott Road) at the hamlet of Delila between Danville and South Boston.

== Major intersections ==
The entire route is in Halifax County.

Location	mi	km	Destinations	Notes
	0.00	0.00	NC 119 south	North Carolina state line; southern terminus
Delila	3.08	4.96	US 58 / US 360 (Philpott Road) / SR 694 north (Medley Road) – Danville, South Boston	Northern terminus
1.000 mi = 1.609 km; 1.000 km = 0.621 mi
