= Woodside (Milton, North Carolina) =

Historic house in North Carolina, United States

- U.S. National Register of Historic Places
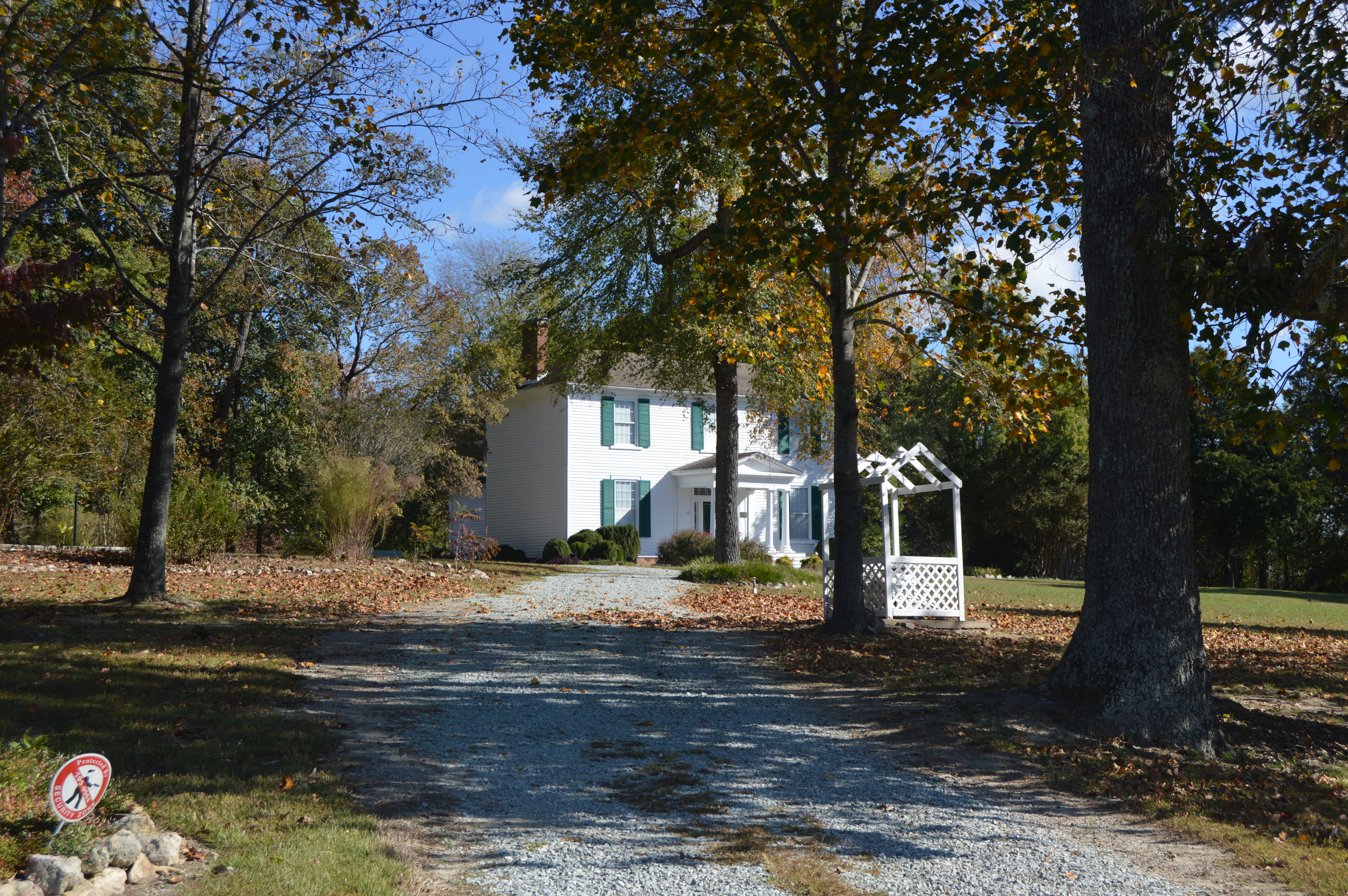
- Driveway view

- Location within North Carolina Location within the United States
- Location: NC 57, near Milton, North Carolina
- Coordinates: 36°31′32″N 79°11′2″W
- Area: 5 acres (2.0 ha)
- Built: 1838
- Built by: Thomas Day
- Architectural style: Greek Revival
- NRHP reference No.: 86000420
- Added to NRHP: March 6, 1986

Woodside is a historic plantation house located near Milton, Caswell County, North Carolina. It was built about 1838, and is Greek Revival style dwelling consisting of a two-story, center-hall plan single-pile main block with a two-story, double-pile rear ell. It has a low hipped roof and features a pedimented portico supported by four unfluted Doric order columns. Also on the property is a contributing smokehouse.

It was added to the National Register of Historic Places in 1986.
