= Milton, North Carolina =

- Town
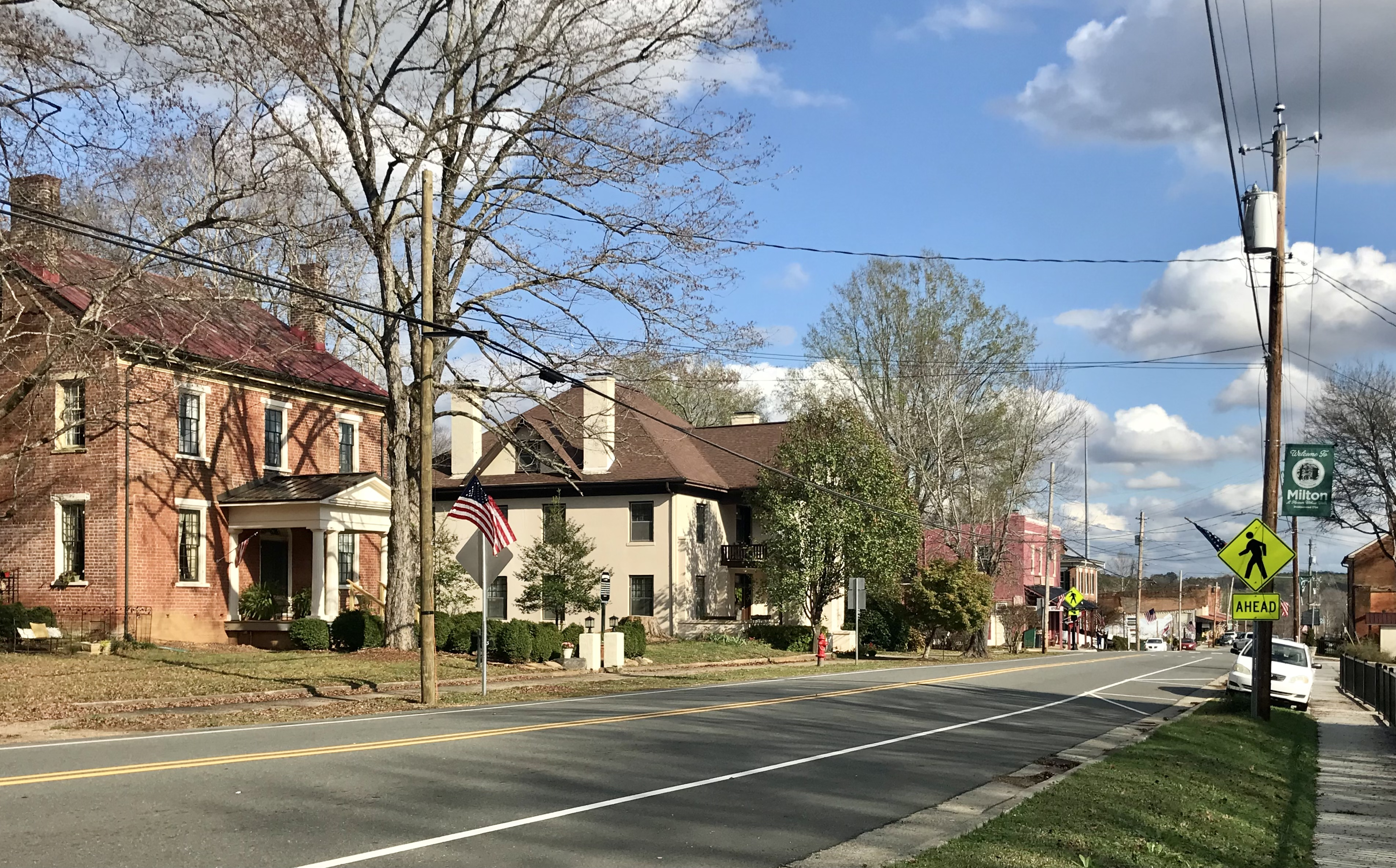
- Broad Street

- Seal

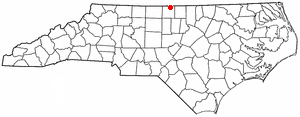
- Location of Milton, North Carolina
- Coordinates: 36°32′14″N 79°12′29″W
- Country: United States
- State: North Carolina
- County: Caswell

Area
  - Total: 0.39 sq mi (1.01 km^{2})
  - Land: 0.39 sq mi (1.01 km^{2})
  - Water: 0 sq mi (0.00 km^{2})
- Elevation: 420 ft (130 m)

Population (2020)
  - Total: 155
  - Density: 398.5/sq mi (153.86/km^{2})
- Time zone: UTC-5 (Eastern (EST))
  - Summer (DST): UTC-4 (EDT)
- ZIP code: 27305
- Area code: 336
- FIPS code: 37-43300
- GNIS feature ID: 2406167
- Website: www.townofmiltonnc.gov

Milton is a town in Caswell County, North Carolina, United States. As of the 2020 census, Milton had a population of 155. It is adjacent to the Virginia International Raceway, just across the state line in Virginia.

The town's name was derived from its beginnings as Mill Town. A mill was established prior to the incorporation of the town.

== History ==
Founded in 1796, Milton is notable for being the home of Thomas Day, a free Black businessman who was a renowned cabinetmaker. Day's creations are celebrated today as a major contribution to American decorative arts.

Day had a workshop and residence in the historic Union Tavern building that is in the process of being restored through an ongoing restoration campaign. A fire severely damaged the building in 1989.

Woodside, a historic plantation home, is located 2 miles (3 km) southeast of the town along Highway 57. It was the home of Caleb Hazard and Mary Dodson Richmond during the mid-19th century. General Stephen Dodson Ramseur, a distinguished Civil War hero, was a nephew of Caleb Hazard and Mary Dodson Richmond, and stayed with them while recuperating from injuries received in the Battle of Malvern Hill. While there, he fell in love with their daughter, Ellen, and they were married in the parlor.

Ramseur was killed almost a year later at the Battle of Cedar Creek. Three days after his death, their only daughter was born at Woodside. A historic marker stands at the front of the yard to honor Ramseur. Inside the house is a book about him, titled Lee's Gallant General. The parlor where the marriage took place is named Ramseur Parlor, and the portraits of General and Mrs. Ramseur are highlighted in two recessed alcoves in remembrance of their story.

Before the Civil War, Milton was notably prosperous as a trade center for products, including tobacco and corn, brought up the Dan River on flatboats. A significant number of the county's wealthy residents made the town their home. In 1846, the town declined to allow the Richmond and Danville Railroad to run through it, citing noise and other concerns.

Milton is the northernmost point of the Colonial Heritage Byway. In addition to Woodside, Longwood, Milton Historic District, Milton State Bank, and Union Tavern are listed on the National Register of Historic Places.

== Geography ==
Milton is located in northeastern Caswell County just to the east of the Dan River. The town is bordered to the north by the state line, with Halifax County, Virginia, to the north.

North Carolina Highways 57 and 62 intersect in the center of town. NC 57 leads southeast 18 miles (29 km) to Roxboro, while NC 62 leads southwest 13 miles (21 km) to Yanceyville, the Caswell County seat. NC 62 turns northwest in Milton, crosses the Dan River, and becomes Virginia State Route 62, which leads northwest to U.S. Route 58. By this route it is 12 miles (19 km) from Milton to Danville, Virginia.

According to the United States Census Bureau, Milton has a total area of 0.4 square miles (1.0 km^{2}), all land.

== Demographics ==
Historical population
Census	Pop.	Note	%±
1880	613		—
1890	705		15.0%
1900	490		−30.5%
1910	419		−14.5%
1920	375		−10.5%
1930	314		−16.3%
1940	329		4.8%
1950	317		−3.6%
1960	235		−25.9%
1970	235		0.0%
1980	235		0.0%
1990	185		−21.3%
2000	132		−28.6%
2010	166		25.8%
2020	155		−6.6%
U.S. Decennial Census

As of the census of 2010, there were 166 people, 65 households, and 41 families residing in the town. The population density was 346.8 inhabitants per square mile (133.9/km^{2}). There were 86 housing units at an average density of 226.0 per square mile (87.3/km^{2}). The racial makeup of the town was 58.33% White, 40.91% African American, and 0.76% from two or more races. Hispanic or Latino of any race were 0.76% of the population.

There were 65 households, out of which 10.8% had children under the age of 18 living with them, 43.1% were married couples living together, 15.4% had a female householder with no husband present, and 36.9% were non-families. 33.8% of all households were made up of individuals, and 20.0% had someone living alone who was 65 years of age or older. The average household size was 2.03 and the average family size was 2.51.

In the town, the population was spread out, with 12.1% under the age of 18, 5.3% from 18 to 24, 21.2% from 25 to 44, 26.5% from 45 to 64, and 34.8% who were 65 years of age or older. The median age was 52 years. For every 100 females, there were 63.0 males. For every 100 females age 18 and over, there were 61.1 males.

The median income for a household in the town was $37,917, and the median income for a family was $41,750. Males had a median income of $35,000 versus $20,625 for females. The per capita income for the town was $20,343. There were 11.8% of families and 19.9% of the population living below the poverty line, including 43.5% of under eighteens and 17.0% of those over 64.
