= Virginia Department of Historic Resources =

Agency of the Commonwealth of Virginia, United States

Agency overview
- Preceding agency: Virginia Landmarks Commission
- Type: State Historic Preservation Office
- Jurisdiction: Government of Virginia
- Headquarters: 2801 Kensington Avenue Richmond, Virginia 23221
- Parent department: Virginia Secretary of Natural Resources
- Website: Virginia Department of Historic Resources

The Virginia Department of Historic Resources is the State Historic Preservation Office for the Commonwealth of Virginia. The agency maintains the Virginia Landmarks Register (the first step for properties and districts in Virginia seeking listing on the National Register of Historic Places). It also holds historic property easements, administers the state's historic tax credit program and approves official highway historical markers for the state. Its headquarters are leased from and shared with the Virginia Historical Society.

It was preceded by the Virginia Historic Landmarks Commission established in 1966.
